= Anonymous Was A Woman Award =

US-American art prize

- Website: www.anonymouswasawoman.org

The Anonymous Was A Woman Award is a grant program for women artists who are over 40 years of age, in part to counter sexism in the art world. It began in 1996 in direct response to the National Endowment for the Arts' decision to stop funding individual artists.

The award is designed to enable exceptional woman artists to further develop their work. Awardees are chosen on the basis of their past accomplishments, their originality and artistic growth, and the quality of their work. The award initially came with a grant of $25,000 and was awarded to 10 women; in 2024 the grant was increased to $50,000 and the number of awardees was permanently increased to 15. Artists may not apply; they grantees are nominated and chosen by prior grant recipients, art historians, and others.

Since 1996, more than 400 women have received the award and approximately $10 million USD has been awarded in total.

The award was founded by a New York artist who originally chose to remain anonymous. She named the award in reference to a line from the Virginia Woolf book A Room of One's Own and in recognition of all the women artists through the ages who have remained anonymous for various reasons. Nominators, who include art writers, curators, art historians, and previous winners, are likewise unnamed.

In July 2018, the artist Susan Unterberg was revealed as both the founder and funder of the award. Before 2018, she had remained anonymous so that her artwork would be evaluated in its own context, without being influenced by her contributions. In an interview, she described her reasons for coming forward, stating "It’s a great time for women to speak up. I feel I can be a better advocate having my own voice," and that she can now work openly to further the organization's cause and to encourage philanthropists and women artists. On top of the awarded grants, Unterberg is considering other forms of programs, possibly seminars, to complement the grants.

== Exhibitions ==
Anonymous Was A Woman: The First 25 Years, Grey Art Museum at New York University, N.Y., April 1-July 19, 2025. This exhibit was curated by Nancy Princenthal and Vesela Sretenović. Anonymous Was A Woman: The First 25 Years, celebrating the awardees from 1996-2020, was published on January 1, 2025, by the Grey Art Museum and Hirmer Verlag.

In Fall 2025, the Kreeger Museum, Washington, D.C., exhibited Anonymous Was a Woman: Jae Ko | linn meyers | Joyce J. Scott | Renée Stout. The exhibited featured the works of Ko, Meyers, Scott and Stout, all Anonymous Was a Woman grant recipients, and all based in the Washington, D.C. area. The exhibit was curated by Dr. Vesela Sretenović.

== Award winners ==
Listed below are the winners of the award.

=== 2026 ===
- Laylah Ali
- Trisha Baga
- nora chipaumire
- Beatriz Cortez
- Ellie Ga
- Andrea Geyer
- Candace Hill-Montgomery
- Elisabeth Kley
- Laura Parnes
- Marsha Pels^{wd}
- Elaine Reichek
- Katherine Sherwood
- Sara Siestreem^{wd}
- Rea Tajiri
- Kay WalkingStick

=== 2025 ===
- Candida Alvarez
- Ambreen Butt
- JoAnne Carson
- Cecelia Condit
- Lola Flash
- Sonya Kelliher-Combs
- Michelle Marcuse
- Park McArthur
- Nicole Miller
- Narcissister
- Dhara Rivera
- Linda Stark
- Kunié Sugiura
- Hong-An Truong
- Paula Wilson

=== 2024 ===
- Erica Baum
- Mary Enoch Elizabeth Baxter
- Mary Lee Bendolph
- Natalie Bookchin
- Rashida Bumbray
- Mary Ellen Carroll
- Robin Hill
- Joyce Kozloff
- Jen Liu
- Gladys Nilsson
- Liz Phillips
- Liliana Porter
- Shirley Tse
- Takako Yamaguchi
- Constantina Zavitsanos

=== 2023 ===
- Carolina Caycedo
- Liz Collins
- Stanya Kahn
- Steffani Jemison
- Barbara Kasten
- Athena LaTocha
- Candice Lin
- Suchitra Mattai
- Dindga McCannon
- Linn Meyers
- Erika Cosby
- Amanda Ross-Ho
- Drew Shiflett
- Cauleen Smith
- Saya Woolfalk

=== 2022 ===
- Micha Cárdenas
- Syd Carpenter
- Yreina Cervántez
- Donna Conlon
- Abigail DeVille
- Leslie Hewitt
- Beatriz Santiago Muñoz
- Mary Lovelace O'Neal
- Jaune Quick-to-See Smith
- Wendy Red Star
- Mira Schor
- Coreen Simpson
- Ka-Man Tse
- Philemona Williamson
- Shirley Woodson

=== 2021 ===
- Nanette Carter - Painting
- Oletha DeVane - Sculpture
- Adama Delphine Fawundu - Photography
- Anita Fields - Sculpture
- Coco Fusco - Time-based media
- Renée Green - Installation
- Judithe Hernández - Drawing
- Suzanne Jackson (artist) - Textile
- Autumn Knight - Performance
- Adia Millett - Interdisciplinary
- Anna Sew Hoy - Performance
- Julie Tolentino - Time-based media
- Dyani White Hawk - Sculpture
- Marian Zazeela - Light installation

=== 2020 ===
- D.Y. Begay – Textiles
- Linda Goode Bryant – Installation
- Barbara Chase-Riboud – Sculpture, Installation
- Elena del Rivero – Painting, Drawing
- Chitra Ganesh – Drawing
- Karen Gunderson – Painting
- Virginia Jaramillo – Painting
- Claudia Joskowicz – Film, Video
- Karyn Olivier – Sculpture
- Juana Valdés – Interdisciplinary

=== 2019 ===
- Elia Alba – Interdisciplinary
- Marsha Cottrell – Drawing
- Torkwase Dyson – Painting
- Heide Fasnacht – Painting, Drawing, Sculpture
- Nona Faustine – Photography
- Rhodessa Jones – Interdisciplinary
- Jennifer Wen Ma – Visual Art
- Amie Siegel – Interdisciplinary
- Diane Simpson – Sculpture
- Karina Aguilera Skvirsky – Photography, Video, Performance

=== 2018 ===
- Dotty Attie – Painting
- María Magdalena Campos-Pons – Photography, performance, painting, sculpture, film, and video
- Patty Chang – Performance, video, writing, installation
- Beverly Fishman – Painting
- Kate Gilmore – Installation, video, performance
- Heather Hart – Multi-disciplinary
- Deborah Roberts – Mixed media
- Rocío Rodríguez – Painting
- Michèle Stephenson – Film
- Betty Tompkins – Painting

=== 2017 ===
- Nancy Bowen – Sculpture and drawing
- Martha Diamond – Painting
- Stephanie Jackson – Painting
- Jennie C. Jones – Mixed-media
- Marisa Morán Jahn – Sculpture, film, video, public art, performance
- Amalia Mesa-Bains – Visual art
- Amy Sherald – Painting
- Michelle Stuart – Visual art
- Mia Westerlund Roosen – Sculpture
- Carrie Yamaoka – Visual art

=== 2016 ===
- Shiva Ahmadi
- Laura Anderson Barbata
- Tania Bruguera
- Sonya Clark
- Simone Leigh
- Medrie MacPhee
- Eiko Otake
- Rona Pondick
- Lourdes Portillo
- Shinique Smith

=== 2015 ===
- Donna Dennis
- Wendy Ewald
- Simone Forti
- Rachel Harrison
- Pam Lins
- Jennifer Montgomery
- Dona Nelson
- Lisa Sanditz
- Lisa Sigal
- Julianne Swartz

=== 2014 ===
- Janine Antoni
- Nicole Eisenman
- Harmony Hammond
- Kira Lynn Harris
- Lynn Hershman Leeson
- Hilja Keading
- Elizabeth King
- Beverly Semmes
- Elise Siegel
- Marianne Weems

=== 2013 ===
- Alice Aycock
- Uta Barth
- Diana Cooper
- Suzan Frecon
- Katy Grannan
- Jane Hammond
- Sharon Hayes
- Suzanne Lacy
- Liza Lou
- Sarah Oppenheimer
- Yvonne Rainer
- Mickalene Thomas

=== 2012 ===
- Ann Agee
- Andrea Fraser
- Mary Kelly
- Jae Ko
- Judy Pfaff
- Betye Saar
- Lorna Simpson
- Jessica Stockholder

=== 2011 ===
- Eleanor Antin
- Linda Besemer
- Dara Birnbaum
- Andrea Bowers
- Ann Hamilton
- Yoko Inoue
- Jungjin Lee
- Mary Miss
- Sheila Pepe
- Judith Shea

=== 2010 ===
- Maureen Connor
- Samm Kunce
- Louise Lawler
- Elizabeth LeCompte
- Suzanne McClelland
- Joyce Pensato
- Laura Poitras
- Victoria Sambunaris
- Arlene Shechet
- Eve Sussman

=== 2009 ===
- Ida Applebroog
- Phyllis Bramson
- Patricia Cronin
- Taylor Davis
- Elana Herzog
- Andrea Modica
- Carrie Moyer
- Kelly Reichardt
- Kay Rosen
- Penelope Umbrico

=== 2008 ===
- KayLynn Deveney
- Lesley Dill
- Gail Dolgin
- Rochelle Feinstein
- Beryl Korot
- Catherine Lord
- Lorraine O’Grady
- Christy Rupp
- Nancy Shaver
- Frances Stark

=== 2007 ===
- Miriam Beerman
- Lois Conner
- Petah Coyne
- Agnes Denes
- Diane Edison
- Paula Hayes
- Joan Semmel
- Jill Slosburg-Ackerman
- Leslie Thornton
- Carrie Mae Weems

=== 2006 ===
- Xenobia Bailey
- Francis Barth
- Judith Bernstein
- Ellen Bruno
- Terry Evans
- Mary Heilmann
- An-My Le
- Howardena Pindell
- Martha Rosler
- Marie K. Watt

=== 2005 ===
- Nancy Chunn
- Deborah Hoffman
- Sharon Horvath
- Zoe Leonard
- Judy Linn
- Senga Nengudi
- Carolee Schneemann
- Valeska Soares
- Kathryn Spence
- Meg Webster

=== 2004 ===
- Janet Biggs
- Moyra Davey
- Liz Deschenes
- Jessica Diamond
- Joy Garnett
- Elizabeth Lyons
- Sarah McEneaney
- J. Morgan Puett
- Alison Saar
- Carmelita Tropicana

=== 2003 ===
- Meg Cranston
- Nancy Davenport
- Nancy Dwyer
- Maria Elena Gaitan
- Gillian Jagger
- Nina Katchadourian
- Melissa Miller
- Joan Nelson
- Frances Reid
- Hanneline Røgeberg

=== 2002 ===
- Lutz Bacher
- Beverly Buchanan
- Kathy Butterly
- Pat de Groot
- Alison Knowles
- Deborah Luster
- Sana Musasama
- Connie Samaras
- Kimsooja
- Gail Wight

=== 2001 ===
- Judith Barry
- Nao Bustamante
- Marta Chilindron
- Anne Chu
- Laura Letinsky
- Yong Soon Min
- Maria Nordman
- Clarissa Sligh
- Mierle Laderman Ukeles
- Jan Yager

=== 2000 ===
- Laura Aguilar
- Chakaia Booker
- Margaret Honda
- Mildred Howard
- Liz Larner
- Beverly McIver
- Catherine Murphy
- Judith Joy Ross
- Ritsuko Taho
- Kukuli Velarde

=== 1999 ===
- Beth B
- Sheila Batiste
- Ginny Bishton
- Nancy Burson
- Judy Fox
- Judith Linhares
- Ruth Marten
- Renee Stout
- Steina Vasulka
- Cecilia Vicuña

=== 1998 ===
- Polly Apfelbaum
- Cindy Bernard
- Ellen Driscoll
- Jeanne Dunning
- Nene Humphrey
- Joan Jonas
- Sermin Kardestuncer
- Lisa Lewenz
- Ann Messner
- Shelly Silver

=== 1997 ===
- Tomie Arai
- Gretchen Bender
- Nancy B. Davidson
- Cheryl Donegan
- Cheryl Dunye
- Judy Glantzman
- Maria Elena Gonzalez
- Kathy Grove
- Maren Hassinger
- Mary Lucier
- Joyce Scott

=== 1996 ===
- Rachel Berwick
- Gina Lamb
- Claudia Matzko
- Robin Mitchell
- Jeanne Silverthorne
- Shellburne Thurber
- Deborah Willis
- Lucy Winer
- Lynne Yamamoto
- Kim Yasuda
