= Pam Lins =

Pam Lins is an artist based in Brooklyn, NY. She refers to all of her work primarily as sculpture, although she uses the term expansively. Through it she contemplates the social, the political, and the historical by constructing situations inquisitive and equivocal to sculpture and the making of it. Her range of adoptive methods includes painting, producing jewelry, drawing cartoons, and growing mushrooms. She currently teaches at Cooper Union School of Art and Princeton University.

== Work and exhibitions ==
Lins’ work explores the space and connections between painting and sculpture, sometimes with a focus on ceramics, leading her to found Ceramics Club with Trisha Baga. Previously, Lins’ work was included in the 2014 Whitney Biennial, in a collaboration with Amy Sillman, and has been exhibited at the Tang Museum of Art, The Suburban, the CCS Bard Hessel Museum of Art, and the Brooklyn Museum of Art. She is represented by Rachel Uffner Gallery in New York. A New York Times review of her 2015 show 'model, model, model' describes her exploration of the links between painting and photography.

== Teaching ==
Lins is an adjunct professor at Cooper Union School of Art where she has taught 3D design, sculpture, and drawing. She is the associate director of the Visual Arts program at Princeton University’s Lewis Center for the Arts, teaches at Bard College, and has taught in the past at various institutions in various capacities.

== Awards ==
Lins is the recipient of multiple awards and fellowships, including The Louis Comfort Tiffany Foundation Award, The Anonymous Was a Woman Award, The Radcliffe Institute Fellowship, the Brown University Howard Foundation Fellowship, and the John Simon Guggenheim Foundation Fellowship Award.
