= Røgeberg =

Røgeberg is a Norwegian surname. Notable people with the surname include:

- Hanneline Røgeberg (born 1963), Norwegian artist
- Marit Røgeberg (1945–2020), Norwegian politician
- Olav Røgeberg (1885–1959), Norwegian journalist, newspaper editor, and magazine editor
- Willy Røgeberg (1905–1969), Norwegian rifle shooter
