= Rachel Berwick =

American sculptor (born 1962)

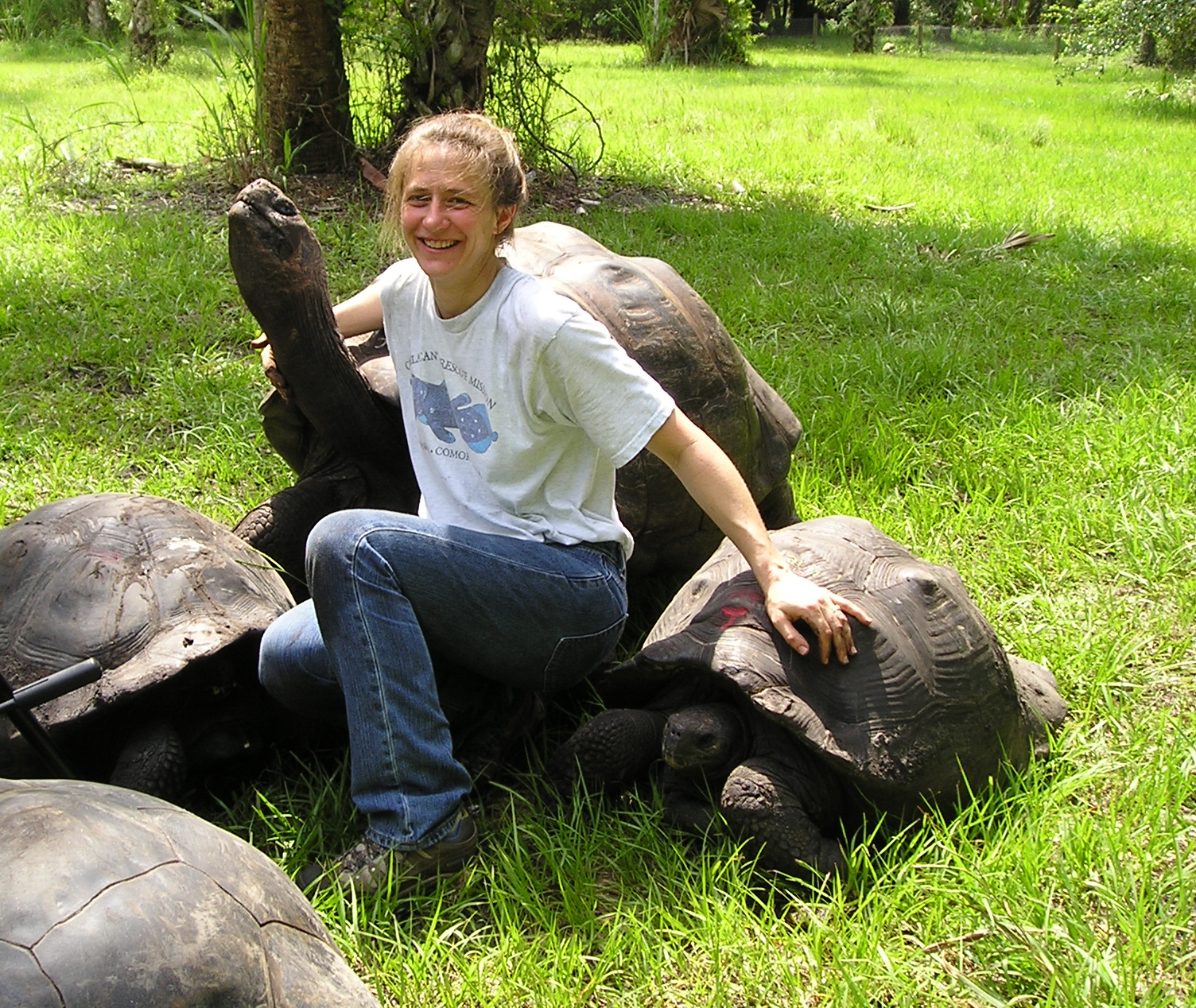
- Artist Rachel Berwick with Galapagos Tortoises while filming for her Installation "Lonesome George"
- Born: 1962 (age 63–64); Somers Point, New Jersey, U.S.
- Education: Rhode Island School of Design, Yale School of Art

Rachel Berwick (born 1962) is an American visual artist whose sculptural installations explore themes of extinction and loss in the natural world.

== Early life ==
Born in Somers Point, New Jersey, Berwick grew up in a rural setting where she gained an appreciation for nature and biology. Berwick studied sculptural arts in the glass department at Rhode Island School of Design. She received her B.F.A. in 1984, and her M.F.A. from Yale School of Art in 1989.

== Career ==
Berwick teaches as a faculty member at the RISD glass department, teaching multiple studio classes. She used to be the head of the department.

== Artwork ==
Berwick has created art installations focused on bird migrations, language transmission, and dying species, often taking inspiration from the animal world. Inspired by Martha (passenger pigeon), Berwick cast 500 amber bird sculptures from a preserved passenger pigeon specimen for her installation entitled A Vanishing; Martha (2003–2005). For her living installation, entitled may-por-é (1996–present), Berwick trained parrots to mimic sounds and words from the Maipure language, as documented in the writings and research of Alexander von Humboldt. In her mixed-media video installation, entitled Lonesome George (2005–2010), Berwick invites the viewer to reflect upon the extinction of a species of Galápagos tortoise.

Berwick's art has been exhibited internationally and she has received many awards and fellowships, including the Anonymous Was A Woman Award (1996), a Smithsonian Artists Research Fellowship (2008), the Joan Mitchell Fellowship (2012), a Connecticut Artists Fellowship (2012), and a Robert Rauschenberg Foundation Artists Residency (2015).
