= Wako University =

Private university in Machida, Tokyo, Japan

Coordinates: 35°34′29″N 139°28′24″E

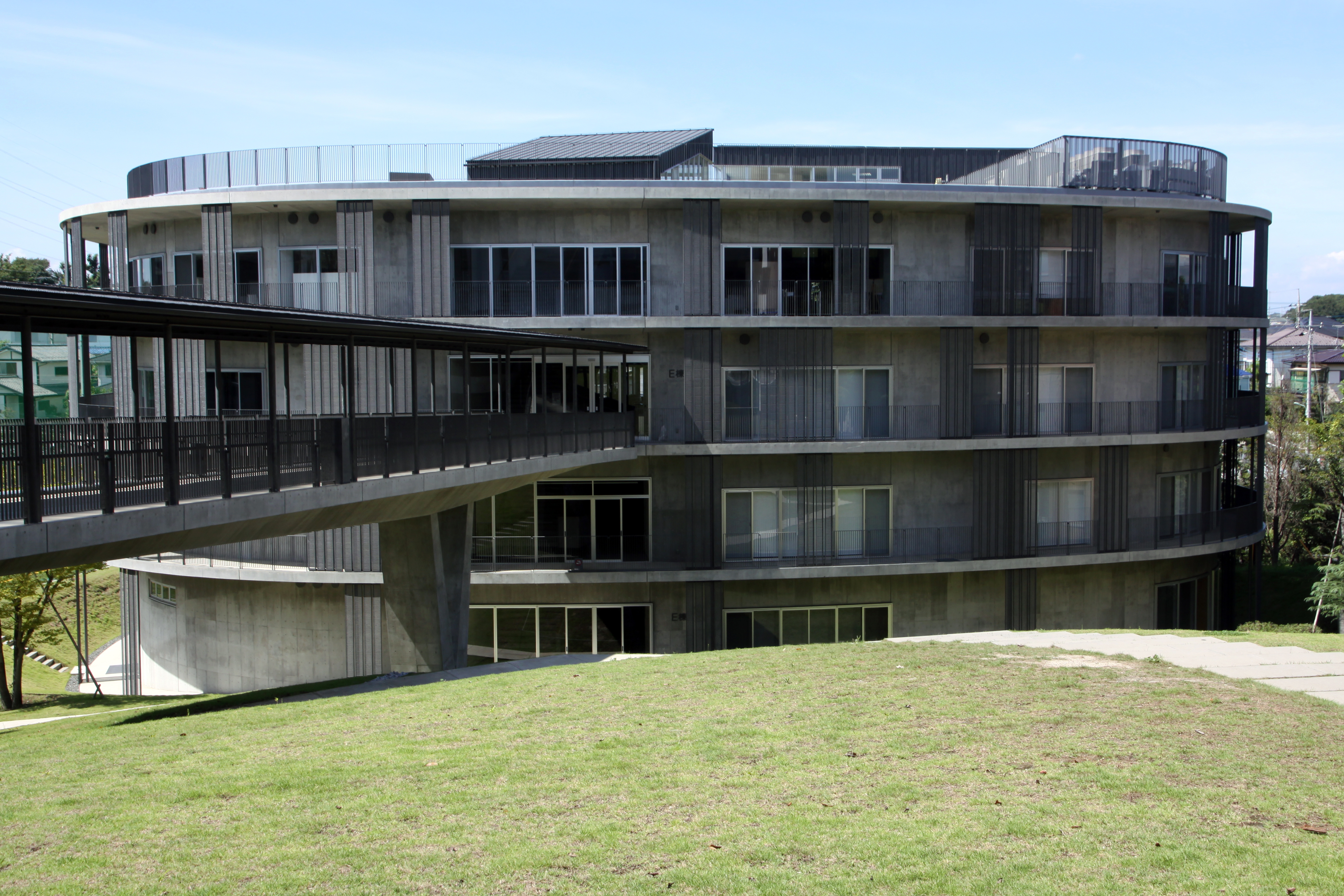
- Motto: Freedom and Individuality
- Type: Private
- Established: 1966; 60 years ago
- President: Masao Shiraishi (Professor of Fine Arts)
- Administrative staff: 355
- Undergraduates: 3621 (M:2363 F:1258)
- Postgraduates: 33 (M:16 F:17)
- Location: Machida, Tokyo, Japan
- Campus: Suburban
- Colors: Green
- Website: Wako University

Wako University (和光大学, Wakō Daigaku) is a private university in Japan. It is located in Machida, Tokyo.

Wako University is part of a comprehensive educational institute called Wako-Gakuen (和光学園; Wako schools), that includes kindergarten, two elementary schools, junior high school and high school. All schools are located in Tokyo. The university has direct attached schools, so that people who have attended from the elementary school are relatively wealthy and then they directly go to the university without taking an examination.

== History ==
Wako University was founded in 1966 as a four-year liberal arts institution of higher learning. Wako's founder and first president, Dr. Satoru Umene, was a pioneering educator who led the postwar movement to reform Japanese higher education.

== Controversy ==
In 2004, Wako University accepted one applicant, however, upon learning that the applicant was the daughter of Shoko Asahara, the mastermind behind the Sarin gas attack on the Tokyo subway, they rescinded her acceptance. This was a controversial event and an assistant professor, Eiji Otsuka, resigned in protest. The president of the university at the time, Osamu Mitsuhashi, was a professor of sociology who had recently published the book "Notes of Discrimination". In end, the university was sentenced by Tokyo District Court to pay a fine of ¥300,000 (US$2,500).

== Undergraduate departments ==
=== Faculty of Human Sciences ===
- Psychology and Education
- Sociological Studies
- Human and Environmental Well-being

=== Faculty of Representational studies ===
- Transcultural studies
- Art

=== Faculty of Economics and Business Management ===
- Economics
- Business and Media

== Graduate department ==
- Social and Cultural Studies

== Notable alumni ==
- Jae Ko (B.F.A. 1988), installation, sculpture, vinyl cord drawings, and drawings on paper
- Taiyou Matsumoto
- Kōji Kumeta
- Gen Urobuchi - Japanese novelist, visual novel writer, and anime screenwriter known for being the co-creator of the anime series Puella Magi Madoka Magica.
