= Terry Evans (photographer) =

American photographer (born 1944)

- Born: 1944 (age 81–82); Kansas City, Missouri, U.S.
- Education: University of Kansas (BFA)
- Occupation: Photographer

Terry Evans (born 1944) is an American photographer. After growing up in Kansas City, she moved to Salina, Kansas, where she was inspired to explore the themes of human relationship with the land. Evans' work explores the environmental impact of humans on the landscape in the American Midwest and is notable for aerial perspective photos of prairies. Her work has been collected by several Museums including the Museum of Modern Art in New York, and the Whitney Museum of American Art. In 1996, she was awarded a Guggenheim Fellowship for her work in photography.

== Life and work ==
Evans was born in Kansas City, Missouri, in 1944. Evan's career as an artist started in 1968, when she graduated from the University of Kansas with a BFA in painting and commercial art. With no formal training in photography, Evans' father taught her the basics and helped develop the skills of what is now her preferred medium. Early in her career, Evans began to take on photojournalistic work consisting of mostly mundane subjects of interest to her, documenting poverty, farmers, her own family, and the residents of her hometown. A decade after graduating, the direction of Evans' career took a turn, when she began photographing isolated areas of untouched prairie land. What started out as a favor to photograph "virgin prairies" for a friend, turned into a subject that would drive Evans' career as a photographer. Interested in the prairies ecology and ground pattern, Evans thought "if I could understand this ecosystem and see these patterns that I would understand how the universe worked". By the 1980s, her attention shifted from pristine prairies to the larger inhabited prairie its pressure on ecology.

== Notable projects ==
=== Ancient Prairies, 2019 ===
Since 1978, the prairie ecosystem has been the main point of interest and driving theme in Evans' photographic projects. The interest began over 40 years ago, when she started photographing undisturbed "virgin" prairies. In her recent series, Ancient Prairies, Terry Evans returns to these untouched prairies, breaking down their ecosystems and their different components. Within this body of work, Evans has created large-scale images that consist of patchworks of different individual photographs to show the ecological complexities that make up the prairie environment. Serving as a tribute to the relationship between humans and nature, Ancient Prairies provides insight into the importance of human care, and reminds the viewer of the beauty behind these landscapes.

=== Meet me at the Trinity, 2013–2014 ===
In 2013, Evans explored the relationship between people and their local environments, particularly that of the Trinity River in Fort Worth, Texas and its recreational users. Inspired by the work of painter George Caleb Bingham and his paintings of Missouri River scenes, Meet Me at the Trinity focuses on the activities and events that take place along the site such as fishing, swimming, concerts and festivals. In 1928, the moving of the river's West and Elm fork into new riverbeds altered the landscape drastically, resulting in an increase of pollution from runoff. Despite the River's current state, Evans creatively documented Trinity River by using her aerial-photo technique, focusing on form, color and the individuals that encompass the space.

=== Canada to Texas, 1996 ===
In 1996, Evans starting working on a body of work that studied the mixed-grass prairie landscape from its northern border in Canada, to its southern border in Texas. During this project, a new form of photography was used by the photographer, aerial photography. From a Cessna 172 aircraft, Evans photographed the landscape from miles above over the course of several years, creating captivating images. Interested in how the landscape changes from North to South, Evans was interested in capturing the landscape in a way that could tell stories about the prairies, showing its history and beauty, even when the land appeared to be damaged by development and fracking. The photographs Evans created in this series guided her photographic career, laying the groundwork for following projects and commissioned works.

== Retrospectives, grants and achievements ==
Over the course of her career, Terry Evans has been awarded several grants, including the 1996 John Simon Guggenheim Memorial Fellowship, and the 2006 Anonymous Was a Woman Fellowship. In 2012, the Nelson-Atkins Museum of Art in Kansas City, Missouri exhibited the photographers first retrospective titled "Heartland: The Photographs of Terry Evans". The retrospective consisted on 100 photographs from Evans, ranging from early black and white portrait work starting in 1971, to the recent colorful images of aerial landscapes. Evans' major publications include Revealing Chicago: An Aerial Portrait, Disarming the Prairie, and Prairie: Images of Ground and Sky.
