= Linda Besemer =

American painter (born 1957)

- Born: 1957 (age 67–68); South Bend, Indiana, U.S.
- Education: Indiana University Bloomington (BFA), Tyler School of Art (MFA)
- Occupations: Painter, video artist, educator
- Known for: Abstract painting
- Awards: Anonymous Was A Woman Award (2011), Guggenheim Fellowship (2022)

Linda Besemer (born 1957) is an American painter, video artist, and educator. She is known for her abstract painting, and was a professor at Occidental College in Los Angeles.

== Life and career ==
Linda Besemer was born in 1957, in South Bend, Indiana. She attended Indiana University Bloomington (BFA 1981), and Tyler School of Art and Architecture at Temple University (MFA 1983).

Besemer was the James Irvine Distinguished Professor of the Arts at Occidental College in Los Angeles from 1987 until 2009. Additionally she taught coursework in gender theory in the women's studies and gender studies departments.

She is known for her large scale abstract paintings, many of which have sculptural properties. Besemer is a recipient of the Anonymous Was a Woman Fellowship (2011), the Louis Comfort Tiffany Foundation Grant, the Chuck Close Rome Prize in painting from the American Academy in Rome, and the Guggenheim Fellowship (2022). In 2025, she was elected as an academic member of the National Academy in New York City.

Besemer's artwork can be found in museum collections including at the San Francisco Museum of Modern Art, the Whitney Museum of American Art, the Buffalo AKG Art Museum, the Los Angeles County Museum of Art, and the Tucson Museum of Art.
