= Elena del Rivero =

Spanish artist

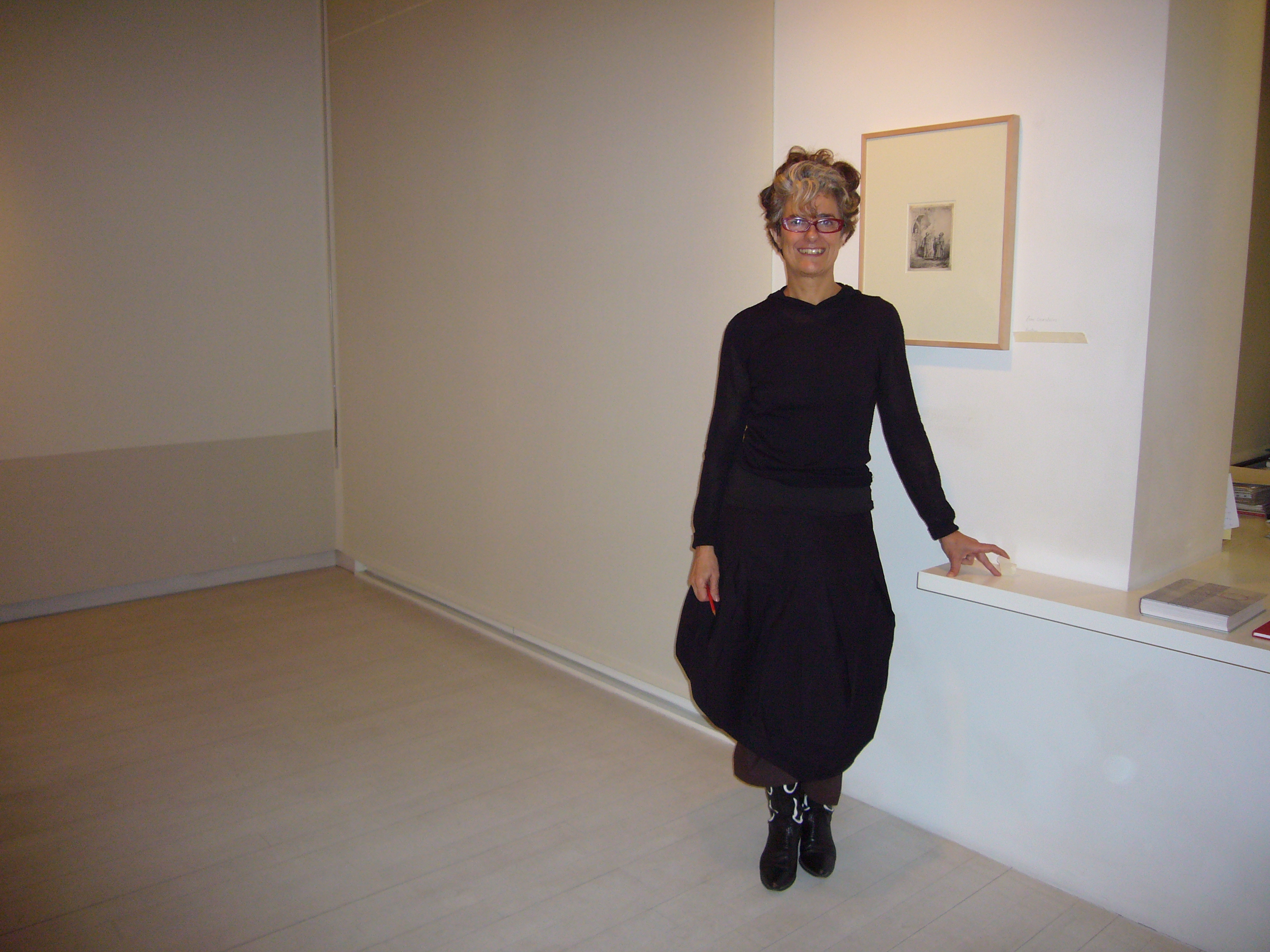
- Born: 1949; Valencia, Spain
- Known for: multi media
- Website: elenadelrivero.com

Elena del Rivero (b. 1949 Valencia, Spain) is a Spanish born American artist known for her installations and artist's books. She has lived in the United States since 1991.

Her work is in the collection of the Metropolitan Museum of Art, the Museum of Modern Art, the National Gallery of Art, and the National Museum of Women in the Arts.

In 2008 the Corcoran Gallery of Art exhibited two of Rivero's installations entitled Home Suite. In 2015 Rivero received a Joan Mitchell Foundation award. In 2019 Rivero received a Guggenheim Fellowship. Rivero's 2020 installation Elena del Rivero: Home Address was created to commemorate the 100th anniversary of the Nineteenth Amendment. It was shown in multiple locations. Also in 2020 she was a recipient of an Anonymous Was A Woman Award.
