= Jennifer Montgomery =

American academic

- Born: May 28, 1961 (age 65); New York City, U.S.
- Education: Wesleyan University (BA); Bard College (MFA)
- Occupations: Filmmaker; video artist
- Awards: Guggenheim Fellowship (1996)

Jennifer Montgomery (born May 28, 1961) is an American filmmaker and video artist. A 1996 Guggenheim Fellow, she has made several films with Super 8 film, as well as some with videotape.

== Biography ==
Jennifer Montgomery was born on May 28, 1961, in New York City. She was one of the subjects of photographer Jock Sturges during her youth, later developing a relationship with him. She obtained her BA from Wesleyan University in 1984, later moving to San Francisco that same year.

Montgomery briefly experimenting with painting, writing, as well as activism with the all-LGBT Victoria Mercado Brigade where she recalled "sending a brigade down with $10,000 for armaments". After one year at the San Francisco Art Institute (1986-1987) and at the Whitney Museum of American Art (1988-1989), she obtained an MFA from Bard College in 1993.

Moving to New York, Montgomery began making experimental films with Super 8 film as her medium, one of the few remaining filmmakers doing so. Her Super-8 short films include Home Avenue (1989), Age 12: Love with a Little L (1990), and I, A Lamb (1992). In 1995, she premiered Art for Teachers of Children, a black-and-white film starring Duncan Hannah and Caitlin Grace McDonnell that "serves up a number of penetrating in-sights into some of the most troubling issues of American sexual politics". She premiered Home Avenue (1989) and Love With a Little L (1990) at the New York Queer Experimental Film Festival. In 1998, she premiered Troika at NewFest. She later produced a feature-length video film, Threads of Belonging. In 2005, she released Notes on the Death of Kodachrome, touching on the obsolescence of her preferred medium, She was part at the 2008 Whitney Biennial.

Montgomery worked at Cooper Union as an Adjunct Professor of Film and Video from 1991 to 1995, before becoming an adjunct professor of women's studies at Barnard College in 1996. She was a film instructor at Ithaca College and the School of Visual Arts in 1995.

Montgomery won a Service Prize at the 1989 San Francisco International Film Festival for Home Avenue. She was awarded a MacDowell Colony Fellowship in 1991. In 1996, she was awarded a Guggenheim Fellowship in filmmaking. She won the Anonymous Was A Woman Award in 2015.

Montgomery was based in Brooklyn as of 1996, but later moved to Chicago by 2008.

== Filmography ==
- Home Avenue (1989, Super 8)
- Age 12: Love with a Little L (1990, Super 8)
- I, A Lamb (1992, Super 8)
- Poet in the Ring (1992, video)
- Art for Teachers of Children (1995)
- Transitional Objects (video)
- Threads of Belonging (video)
- Notes on the Death of Kodachrome (2005)
- River Wild (video)
