= Ginny Bishton =

American artist (born 1967)

- Born: 1967 (age 58–59); Burbank, California
- Education: Bachelor's of Arts and Master's of Fine Arts from the University of California, Los Angeles

Ginny Bishton is an American multimedia artist based out of Los Angeles, California. Bishton was born in 1967 in Burbank, California. She attended the University of California, Los Angeles, where she earned a Bachelor’s of Arts in 1992 and a Master’s of Fine Arts in 1995. She is most well known for her photography collages, pen-and-ink drawings, and ink paintings. Her work is often described as abstract, conceptualist and/or minimalist art that focuses heavily on the meticulous and labor intensive processes that go into her pieces. Bishton's process focuses on daily life, often drawing inspiration from her home, garden, and neighborhood hiking trails. She has described her own style as representative of, “the perceived value of quotidian activities and minutia.” Bishton has been noted as often using photos of materials, such as vegetables and garden plants, from in and around her home as the color palette that is used to craft her photo collages. Michael Ned Holte, in an article about Bishton's works displayed at Richard Telles Fine Art, lauded Bishton's work when he wrote, "Her meticulous works celebrate the routine pleasures of art and life, inevitably intertwined, with an elegantly idiosyncratic approach all her own." Works by Bishton are in the collections of several American art galleries including the Museum of Modern Art, New York; San Francisco Museum of Modern Art; Museum of Contemporary Art, Los Angeles; Hammer Museum, Los Angeles; and the Los Angeles County Museum of Art. Bishton has also been featured in many solo and group exhibitions throughout her career and has received awards such as the Anonymous Was A Woman Award and The Louis Comfort Tiffany Foundation.

== Body of work ==
Since 1995 Bishton’s work has been featured in eleven solo exhibitions and around thirty group exhibitions or catalogues across the United States and internationally. Today her works are included in the permanent collections of several prominent American art galleries.

=== Solo exhibitions ===
- 1995: Richard Telles Fine Art, Los Angeles
- 1997: Richard Telles Fine Art, Los Angeles
- 2001: Richard Telles Fine Art, Los Angeles
- 2004: Studio Guenzani, Milan, Italy
- 2005: Nicole Klagsbrun, New York
- 2005: Richard Telles Fine Art, Los Angeles
- 2007: Richard Telles Fine Art, Los Angeles
- 2010: “More is Less and Less”, Richard Telles Fine Art, Los Angeles
- 2010: Pomona College Museum of Art, Claremont, CA (cat.)
- 2011: Marc Jancou Contemporary, New York
- 2015: “The News Threw Her”, Richard Telles Fine Art, Los Angeles

=== Works in permanent collections ===
==== Museum of Modern Art, New York ====
- Untitled (0296), 1996
- Walking (Dry Winter), 2002
- Walking (But Missing Much), 2002

==== San Francisco Museum of Modern Art ====
- Untitled, 2009

==== Museum of Contemporary Art, Los Angeles ====
- Untitled (#3), 1995
- Walking #5, 2000

==== Hammer Museum, Los Angeles ====
- Untitled (#9), 1995
- Lavender and Yellow, 2004

==== Los Angeles County Museum of Art ====
- Untitled (#9), 1995
- Walking 1, 1998
- Walking, without ease, 2004

== Awards ==
- Anonymous Was A Woman Award: 1999 Photography and Collage
- The Louis Comfort Tiffany Foundation Biennial Competition Award: 2003
