= Jae Ko =

Korean-born artist

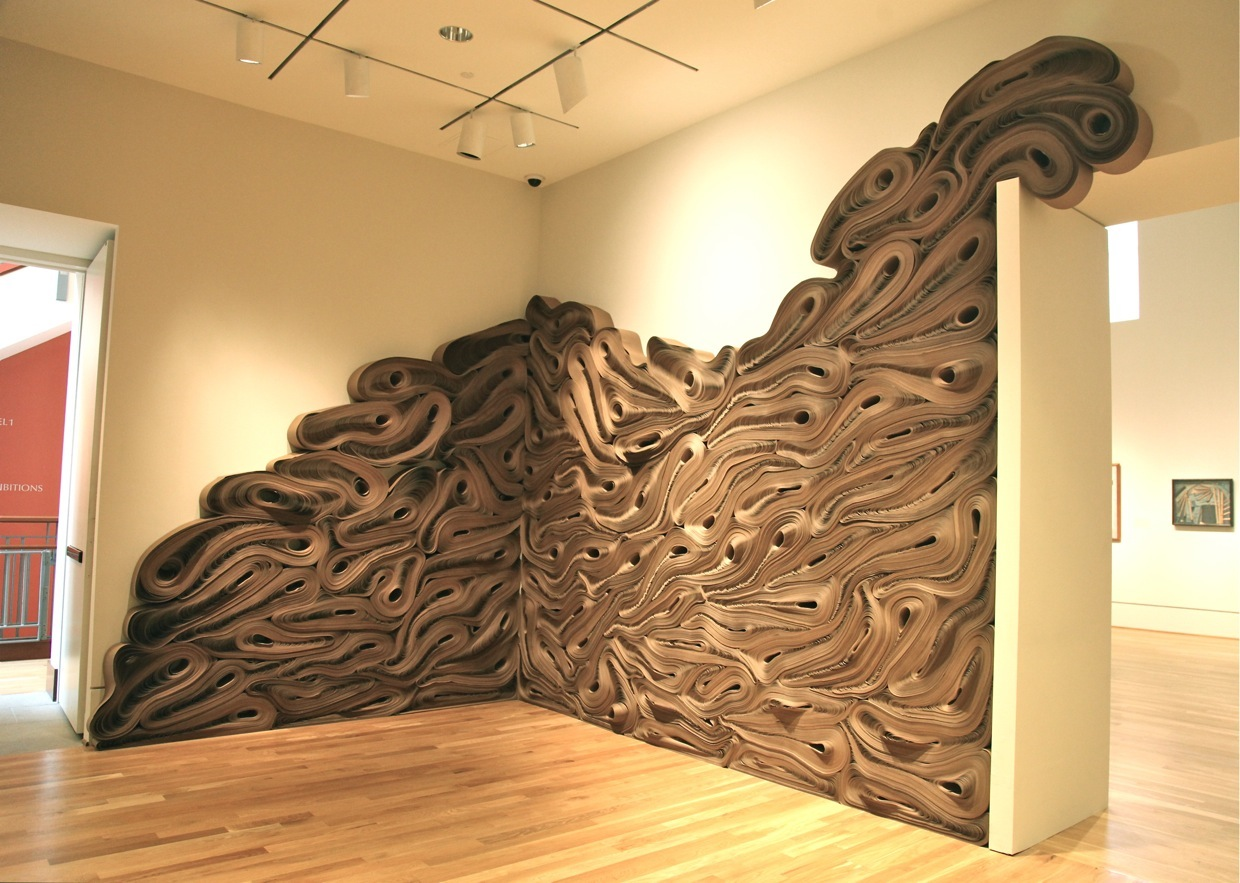
Force of Nature installation, part of the Phillips collection in Washington DC

Jae Ko is a Korean-born artist currently living and working in Alexandria, Virginia and Piney Point, Maryland.

== Background ==
Ko attended Toyo Art School in Tokyo, Japan, completing her studies in 1984. She received her BFA in 1988 from Wako University in Tokyo, Japan and her MFA in 1998 from Maryland Institute College of Art (MICA) in Baltimore, Maryland.

== Work ==
Ko works in a variety of media — installation, sculpture, vinyl cord drawings, and drawings on paper.

Ko is recognized for using rolled paper to create undulating, kinetic sculpture. Ko's pieces range from stark white to the brown of recycled paper to deep blue. Ko's large-scale works can require tens of thousands of pounds of paper to produce, and many hours to install.

== Exhibitions ==
Ko has pieces exhibited as part of public collections at the Hirshhorn Museum and Sculpture Garden in Washington, D.C., the Phillips Collection in Washington, D.C., and ADM in Chicago, among others. Ko's Untitled JK #526, created in 2006, is a part of the collection of the Contemporary Art Purchasing Program (CAPP) at University of Maryland.

Ko has had many solo exhibitions — most recently at Houston, TX's Contemporary Arts Museum and at Galerie Lausberg in Düsseldorf, Germany.

In Fall 2025, Ko’s work was featured in an exhibit at the Kreeger Museum titled Anonymous Was a Woman: Jae Ko | linn meyers | Joyce J. Scott | Renée Stout. The exhibit featured the work of artists in the Washington, D.C. area who are also Anonymous Was a Woman grantees. The exhibit was curated by Dr. Vesela Sretenović, who co-curated the Grey Art Museum’s Summer 2025 group exhibit Anonymous Was a Woman: The First 25 Years.

== Awards ==
Ko has won awards from the National Endowment for the Arts, the Maryland State Arts Council and The Pollock-Krasner Foundation, Inc. In 2012, Ko was a recipient of the Anonymous Was A Woman Award. The award, granted to 10 women over the age of 45, is a no-strings grant of $25,000 allowing the artists "to continue to grow and pursue their work."
