= Beatriz Cortez =

El Salvadoran artist and educator

- Born: 1970, age 56; San Salvador, El Salvador
- Education: Arizona State University (Ph.D.); California Institute of the Arts (M.F.A.)
- Known for: Sculpture; installation art exploring migration, temporality, and memory
- Notable work: Tzolk'in; Memory Insertion Capsule; Trinidad / Joy Station
- Style: Contemporary art; speculative and conceptual sculpture
- Awards: Rema Hort Mann Foundation Fellowship (2018); Artist Community Engagement Grant (2017); California Community Foundation Fellowship (2016)
- Website: https://beatrizcortez.com/

Beatriz Cortez (born 1970) is a Los Angeles-based artist and scholar born in San Salvador, El Salvador. Cortez draws her inspiration for many of her sculptures from literature, archives, philosophies, ancient art, and Indigenous cultures. According to Cortez, her work explores "simultaneity, life in different temporalities, and different versions of modernity, particularly in relation to memory and loss in the aftermath of war and the experience of migration."

Cortez holds a Ph.D. in Latin American literature from Arizona State University and an Master of Fine Arts from the California Institute of the Arts. She currently teaches in the Central American Studies Department at California State University, Northridge. She is currently represented by Commonwealth and Council in Los Angeles.

== Notable works ==
=== Memory Insertion Capsule ===
Cortez's 2017 work Memory Insertion Capsule explores concepts ranging from ancient migration to the history of forced sterilization by eugenicists in L.A. in the early 20th century. Memory Insertion Capsule references both local construction techniques along with Indigenous architecture, all while taking the form of a spacecraft/capsule. Cortez incorporates steel and futuristic concepts with Indigenous architecture to connect back to her philosophy of understanding “migration as a planetary motion that has existed for millions of years”. Within the capsule sits a steel helmet that projects images referencing Paul Popenoe who supported the theory of eugenics. The tent above the capsule refers to homelessness and forced migration that is happening to this day both in and outside of Los Angeles. The capsule itself is 12-sided with visible bumps on each of the steel panels mimicking the repujado metalwork of earlier Spanish colonists. All of the welding is done by Cortez herself, thus referencing gender constructs and how “men make things with steel, while women stitch. … When I’m welding, I imagine myself a seamstress”. Numerous symbols and concepts are presented by this work however, Cortez primarily hopes to change the concept of how we view Indigenous cultures as being a part of the past and instead “imagine indigenous people as part of our future”.

=== Tzolk'in ===
One of Cortez's most popular works, Tzolk'in consists of two identical sculptures in two separate locations, one at the Hammer Museum as part of the Made in L.A. 2018 installation, and the other by the Los Angeles River as a site-specific independent public art piece. The locations were chosen to highlight the different realities that often exist within the same city. Though they were 20 miles apart, both of the sculptures faced each other, referencing the bond that the two sculptures have to each other, much like the "bond that binds two entities of the same kind across space and time."

Cortez created a third virtual Tzolk'in in order to honor the death of Claudia Gomez Gonzales, who was killed by a U.S. Customs and Border Protection agent near the Rio Grande in 2018. The virtual sculpture was created by partnering with Nancy Baker Cahill's app 4th Wall. The piece can be viewed by using the app at the site of Gomez Gonzales' death along the Rio Grande.

== Exhibitions and collections ==
Cortez has had solo exhibitions at Craft Contemporary, Los Angeles (2019); Clockshop, Los Angeles (2018); Vincent Price Art Museum, Los Angeles (2016); Monte Vista Projects, Los Angeles (2016); Centro Cultural de España de El Salvador (2014); and Museo Municipal Tecleño (MUTE), El Salvador (2012). Selected group exhibitions have included her work at Tina Kim Gallery, New York (2018); Hammer Museum, Los Angeles (2018); BANK/MABSOCIETY, Shanghai, China (2017); Ballroom Marfa, Marfa, Texas (2017); Whitney Museum of American Art, New York (2017); Centro Cultural Metropolitano, Quito, Ecuador (2016); and Los Angeles Contemporary Exhibitions (2016). Cortez has received an Emergency Grant from the Foundation of Contemporary Arts (2019), the Rema Hort Mann Foundation Emerging Artist Grant (2018), the Artist Community Engagement Grant (2017), and the California Community Foundation Fellowship for Visual Artists (2016).

=== Trinidad / Joy Station (2019) ===
Trinidad / Joy Station was on view from January 27 to May 12, 2019 at Craft Contemporary in Los Angeles. In this exhibition Cortez imagined a future communal life that combines upon geodesic dome architecture or post-war utopian communities in the United States with the collective living practices of the ancient Maya in what is present-day El Salvador. The installation speaks to notions of speculative thought, nomadism, and Spinozian Joy.

== Collections ==
Cortez's work is featured in the following collections: The Broad Museum at MSU (East Lansing, MI), El Paso Museum of Art (El Paso, Texas), Ford Foundation (New York, New York), Mario Cader-Fench Collection (Miami, Florida), and Museo Comunitario Kaqjay (Patzicía, Guatemala).

== Awards and fellowships ==
Awards, grants, and fellowships Cortez has received include: Anonymous Was A Woman grant (2026), Artadia Los Angeles Award (2020), Inaugural Frieze LIFEWTR Sculpture Prize (2019), Emergency Grant. Foundation for Contemporary Arts (2019), Rema Hort Mann Foundation Grant for Emerging Artists (2018), The Main Museum Artist-in-Residence, Los Angeles (2018), Artist Community Engagement Grant in Los Angeles (2017), California Community Foundation Fellowship for Visual Artists (2016–2017), The Reef, Artist-in-Residence (2015–2016), Cerritos College Art + TECH Artist-in-Residence (2015), Guatemala después: Investigación artística, intercambio y enlace público en lugares de memoria y transformación. (Guatemala afterwards: Artistic research, exchange, and public engagement in sites of memory and transformation). “Vida y memoria” (“Life and Memory”), proyecto colectivo con Kaqjay Moloj (collaborative project with the Kaqjay Moloj collective). Site specific: Patzicía, Guatemala. Ciudad imaginación & the New School in New York City (2014–2015), and Walt Disney Company Foundation Scholarship, California Institute of the Arts (2013–2015).

Cortez received the 2018 Rema Hort Mann Foundation Fellowship for Emerging Artists, the 2017 Artist Community Engagement Grant, and the 2016 California Community Foundation Fellowship for Visual Artists.

In 2017, Cortez was featured in a science fiction-themed exhibit at University of California, Riverside, and in 2018, her work was shown in the Made in L.A. group artist exhibition at the Hammer Museum in Los Angeles.
