= Sana Musasama =

American artist

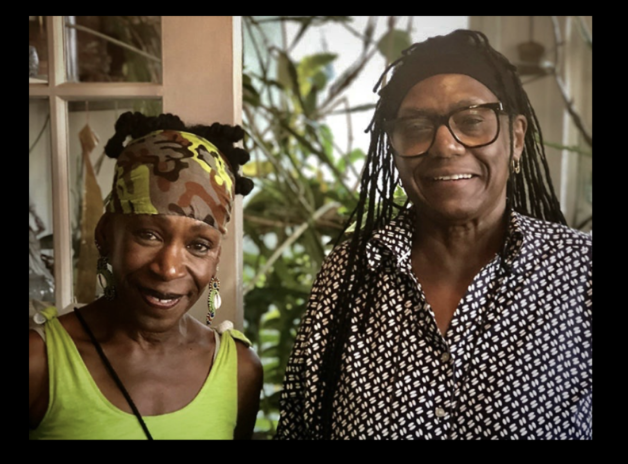
- Musasama and Janet Olivia Henry
- Born: Saint Albans, New York
- Education: BA The City College of New York (1974), MFA Alfred State College of Ceramics (1987)
- Known for: Ceramic, sculpture
- Awards: Anonymous Was a Woman Award (2002)
- Website: sana-musasama.com

Sana Musasama is an African-American ceramic and mixed-media artist based in New York City. Her artistic practice parallels her work as an educator and commitment to human rights causes especially the human trafficking of women. Musasama is an associate adjunct professor at Hunter College.

== Early life and education ==
Musasama was born in Saint Albans, New York.

She holds a BA in Ceramics and Education from City College (1974) and an MFA from Alfred State College of Ceramics (1987). She continued her ceramic studies at the Archie Bray Foundation in Helena, Montana; the Gakium Designer College in Tokyo, Japan; the Tuscarora International School of Ceramics in Tuscarora, Nevada; and at Mende Pottery in Mendeland, Sierra Leone.

== Career ==
Musasama's artistic practice and work as an educator is informed by her extensive travels to Africa, Asia, and Latin America including countries such as Sierra Leone, Cambodia, Vietnam, and Japan to learn about non-Western cultures, specifically as relates to womanhood and socio-political issues impacting women. In the 1970s she traveled to West Africa where she lived and worked in Mendeland, Sierra Leone, it was there she first witnessed the effects of female circumcision of young girls. This experience informed her interest in other women's issues including: foot binding, dowry burning, rape and prostitution. For over 20 years Musasama has researched these issues and created artwork in response.

=== Maple Tree series (1992–1994) ===
Five of Musasama's Maple Tree series sculptures were exhibited at the Fine Arts Gallery at Long Island University in Southampton, NY in April 1998. The Maple Tree series is a group of about thirty totemic ceramic sculptures based on the Maple Tree Movement, who were a group of abolitionists from the 1790s that advocated ending the sugar cane industry and thus ending slavery on West Indian sugar plantations. They hoped maple syrup would replace sugar cane eliminating the need for slave labor. The sculptures in the series were made using various clay bodies and resemble trees with organic and bodily extensions. They are scaled to the human body, ranging from 3.5 to over 5 feet, and in addition to ceramic are made from materials such as stone, beads, and moss. Some of the sculptures from the series were created at artist residencies, and are named after the place where they were made.

Stop (1994) and Sugar vs Sap (1992), two sculptures from the Maple Tree series, were exhibited in the No Longer Empty: Southeast Queens Biennial in 2018.

== Volunteer work and teaching ==
In addition to working as a professor in higher education and teaching ceramics workshops nationally and internationally, Musasama has volunteered at organizations in New York City such as GEMS (Girls Educational & Mentoring Services) that works with survivors of human trafficking and exploitation; and CASES (Center for Alternative Sentencing and Employment). She has also worked with AFESIP Cambodia and Together1Heart, organizations dedicated to supporting and rescuing girls and young women that are victims of human trafficking.

== Public collections ==
Musasama's work is held in the collections of the Studio Museum in Harlem, Hood Museum of Art, Cooper Hewitt National Design Museum, Mint Museum of Craft and Design, the European Ceramic Center in Hertogenbosch, the Netherlands; the Archie Bray Foundation in Helena, Montana, and the Schomburg Center for Research in Black Culture in New York.

== Exhibitions ==
=== Selected solo exhibitions ===
- 2024: Returning to Ourselves, Everson Museum of Art, Syracuse, New York
- 2022: I Never Played with Dolls, Tiger Strikes Asteroid New York
- 2010: Unknown/Unnamed, June Kelly Gallery, New York
- 2010: The Hand, Meta House Gallery, Phnom Penh, Cambodia
- 2009: Women, Chatham University, Pittsburgh, Pennsylvania
- 2007: A Season of Abundance: The Maple Tree Series of Sana Musasama, curated by chief curator, David Revere McFadden, Hopkins Center, Dartmouth College, Hanover, NH; catalogue
- 2006: ETHOS, Social Consciousness and Craft, Penland School of Craft, Penland, NC
- 2005: Shhh…Secrets, Status, Society, June Kelly Gallery, New York
- 2001: Outer Beauty, Inner Anguish, June Kelly Gallery, New York
- 1998: Maple Tree Series, Fine Arts Gallery, Southampton College of Long Island University, Southampton, New York
- 1984: From the Studio: The Studio Museum in Harlem Artist-in-Residence, 1984, curated by Schroeder Cherry, The Studio Museum in Harlem, New York

=== Selected group exhibitions ===
- 2016: 50 Women-A Celebration of Women's Contribution to Ceramics, American Jazz Museum, Kansas City, MO
- 2013: Body & Soul, Museum of Arts and Design, New York, NY
- 2013: History, Haunting and Palimpsests, Anya & Shiva Gallery, John Jay College, NY
- 2009: Modern and Contemporary Art at Dartmouth, Hood Museum of Art, Dartmouth, New Hampshire
- 2006: Edges of Grace, Fuller Craft Museum, Boston, MA
- 2002: New Works, Crocker Art Museum, Sacramento, CA
- 1999: Cultural Influences in Craft, North Carolina Central University, Durham, NC

== Recognition ==
Musasama's work has been recognized with numerous awards including an Anonymous Was a Woman Award in 2002, Joan Mitchell Painters and Sculptors Grant in 2013, and was a Studio Museum in Harlem Artist-in-Residence in 1983–84.
