= Ellie Ga =

American artist, writer, and performer

- Born: 1976 (age 49–50); New York
- Education: Hunter College, New York, Marymount Manhattan College
- Known for: Multidisciplinary Art (video, performance)
- Website: elliega.info

Ellie Ga (born 1976 in New York City) is an American artist, writer and performer. Ga produces narratives in the form of video installations, performances and artist's books. She is a Guggenheim 2022 Fellow in film and video and an Anonymous Was A Woman grant recipient. She received an MFA from the Hunter College in New York, NY and a BA from Marymount Manhattan College, NY. Ga is represented by Bureau, New York. She lives and works in Stockholm, Sweden.

== Work ==
Introducing Ga's work in a 2018 interview, Anna Della Subin writes: "Ellie Ga is an artist of the intrepid. Charting a course from Patagonia to the North Pole, she voyages through histories, mythologies and languages, navigating the role of the artist on a precarious planet. Her points of latitude are chance meetings, accidents and coincidences."

Ga's writing is closely tied to her performative practice. In an essay on Ellie Ga's work, Lauren O'Neill-Butler writes, "her lyrical essays—her voiceovers and written texts—are as equally concerned with humans as they are with the lives, histories, and migrations of objects, particularly the lost meaning of symbols."

She is a founding editor of Ugly Duckling Presse. In 2018, she worked with Siglio Press to produce the book Square Octagon Circle. Max L. Feldman, in a 2018 Hyperallergic review of Square Octagon Circle, described her working process as similar to that of a "conceptual archaeologist."

Of the artist, critic Jennifer Kabat wrote for Frieze, "Ellie Ga's essays – which manifest as performances and installations – guide you on expeditions to the Arctic or through Egypt searching for the first lighthouse."

Ga's work Gyres 1-3 premiered in the 2019 edition of the Whitney Biennial at the Whitney Museum of American Art.

=== The Fortunetellers ===
From 2007 to 2009 Ga was a part of the Tara expedition drifting through the Arctic pack ice. Based on the expedition Ga produced a series of works called The Fortunetellers. Among the works in the series are the performances The Fortunetellers and Reading the Deck of Tara. The Tara is a sailboat designed to withstand the pressure of the polar ice cap. Stuck, with little ability to communicate with the outside world, the near constant darkness weighed upon the boat's passengers. Ga, in her account of their eventual release from the ice, describes seeing light for the first time: "At that moment," she writes in the Square Octagon Circle, "a lighthouse blinking in the distance became a symbol for our anxieties about the future: it marked our return to civilization." The series included performances, installations and videos, and was shown at The New Museum in February 2013. Ga was selected to be a member of the Tara expedition based on her eighteen month residency at the New York Explorers Club where she began exploring incomplete paper trails and documentation related to historical explorations.

=== Square Octagon Circle ===
Square Octagon Circle is a 14-piece multimedia project and book. The purpose of the project is to determine what the Lighthouse of Alexandria looked like. The lighthouse is one of the lost seven wonders of the world.

In 2011, Ga studied marine archeology at the University of Alexandria's Centre for Maritime Archaeology and Underwater Cultural Heritage in Alexandria Egypt. This was the basis for a series of videos and performances about the submerged ruins of the ancient Lighthouse of Alexandria, including the video installations Four Thousand Blocks and Measuring the Circle, and the performance Eureka, A Lighthouse Play produced by the Curtis R. Priem Experimental Media and Performing Arts Center (EMPAC) in 2014. A comprehensive exhibition of the works in Square Octagon Circle was shown at Le Grand Café, Saint-Nazaire in 2015.

=== Strophe, A Turning ===
From 2014-2017 Ga was the recipient of a fellowship from the Swedish Research Council. Initially her research project was centered on ocean drift and more specifically the narratives and history of the message in a bottle. The project developed into the video installation Strophe, A Turning.

In their presentation text of Strophe, A Turning for the 2018 edition of the Clandestino Festival, the Museum of World Culture in Gothenburg writes: "...her own willingness to drift and follow uncertain turns carries her unexpectedly to the Greek islands of Symi and Lesvos, during the summer of 2015. Ga decides to join a team of volunteers aiding asylum seekers and refugees—a definitive turning point at which she is forced to wrestle not only with the poetics of accidental drift and the new discoveries it beckons, but with urgent political and humanitarian realities."

=== Gyres ===
Gyres, is a single channel video installation that premiered at the 2019 Whitney Biennial. The installation consists of Gyres 1-3, a triptych of short videos. Ga's voice-over narrates as collected images are arranged and re-arranged on a light box surface, weaving together experiences of loss and grief, the transient nature and meaning of personal items displaced by disasters.

Presenting Gyres 1-3, The Whitney Museum writes: "Ga's narration interweaves seemingly disparate accounts and retellings, blending history, research, and autobiography. She encounters beachcombers who gather the aftermath of the 2011 tsunami in Japan; an oceanographer who studies the debris from container spills; and the histories of resistance, migration, and ritual offerings on the Greek islands of the Aegean Sea."

=== Quarries ===
Quarries is a single channel video installation that premiered in 2022 at Jeu de Paume, Paris in the exhibition Fata Morgana.

Quarries follows the mysteries surrounding prehistoric stone tools from Kenya alongside the neglected labor of stonemasons who paved the streets of Lisbon. The humble gesture of these artisans, stooped over the pavement, morphs into a confrontation with the hubristic act of monument building. For the artist's brother, the struggle to regain the use of his hands after a serious injury transforms into a narrative about agency in the face of being forgotten, marginalized and deemed of no importance. An out-of-print photography book on Portuguese stone pavements leads to a series of improbable connections. A tour of a neurobiology lab leads to an examination of a Cold War re-education camp where prisoners were forced to dig up stones to create replicas of antiquity while covertly drawing on stone shards to mark and then bury a trace of their stories. In Quarries, Ga extracts stories of resistance from unlikely places and on overlooked surfaces.

In a The New Yorker review of the work, Johanna Fateman writes how Quarries: "...relays a winding account of such seemingly unrelated subjects as Ga's brother's paralysis, the discovery of ancient stone tools, and the neuroscience of insects. Across a three-channel projection, a pair of hands arrange objects and images on a light table, moving them from the center to the margins, and then offscreen. The triptych concludes with a fascinating history of Portuguese calçada, a near-extinct street-paving technique with a complex legacy - the labor was often performed by prisoners - that produced dizzying mosaics from irregularly shaped fragments of basalt and limestone."

Quarries was screened at FIDMarseille in its 2022 Official Selection.

== Selected writings ==
- Classification of A Spit Stain, Ugly Duckling Presse, 2009 (ISBN 978-1-933254-45-6)
- Three Arctic Booklets, Ugly Duckling Presse, 2010
- Dialogue (with Marcelline Delbecq), Shelter Press, 2017 (ISBN 978-2-36582-021-9)
- North Was Here, Ugly Ducking Presse, 2018 (ISBN 978-1-946433-14-5)
- Square Octagon Circle, Siglio Press, 2018 (ISBN 978-1-938221-18-7)

== Collections ==
- Albright-Knox Art Gallery, Buffalo, NY
- Fluentum Collection, Berlin, Germany
- Fondation Galeries Lafayette, Paris, France
- FRAC Franche-Comté, Besançon, France
- Hessel Museum of Art, Bard College, New York, NY
- Solomon R. Guggenheim Museum, Manhattan, NY
- National Swedish Arts Council
- Whitney Museum of American Art, New York, NY
