= Linn Meyers =

American visual artist (born 1968)

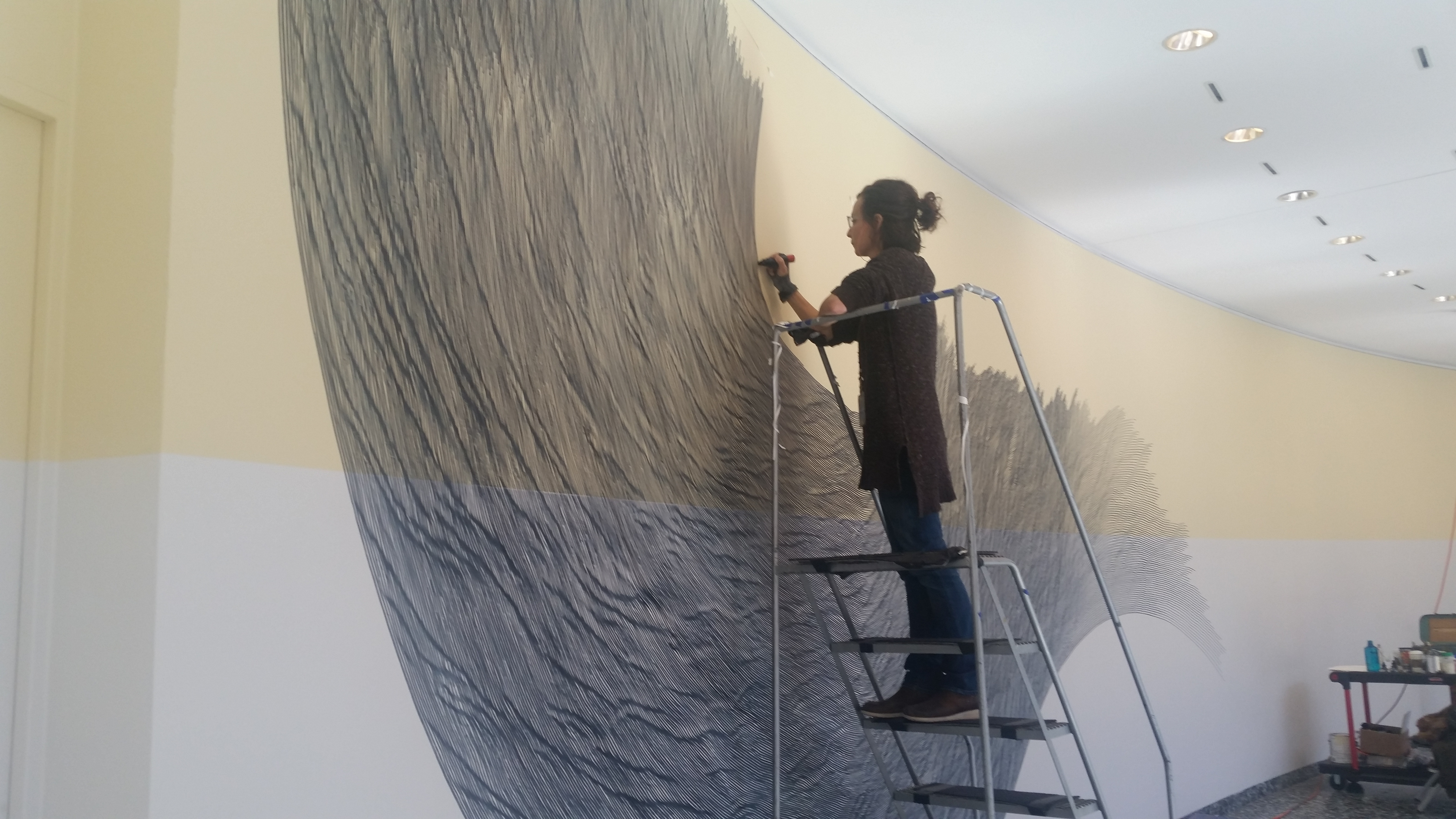
- Linn Meyers at the Hirshhorn, April 2016
- Born: 1968 (age 56–57); Washington, D.C., United States
- Education: California College of the Arts; The Cooper Union
- Known for: Drawing, painting, site-specific art, printmaking
- Awards: Anonymous Was a Woman Award, Smithsonian Institution, Pollock-Krasner Foundation
- Website: linn meyers website

Linn Meyers, Every now. And again, ink on wall, 2011. Hammer Museum.

Linn Meyers (born 1968), known professionally as linn meyers, is a visual artist based in Washington, DC and Los Angeles. She is known for dense, intricate drawings, paintings, installations and prints that range in scale from page-sized images to large pieces on Mylar and panel to monumental, site-specific wall works. Her art is rooted in a process of repetitive drawing—thousands of hand-drawn marks that come together to form rhythmic, patterned wholes and serve as records of their own making. While ostensibly abstract, her works are also widely suggestive of natural phenomena and fundamental aspects of the universe, from fingerprints to galaxies, and cellular patterns to tidal waves. Curator Anne Ellegood observed, "She is after a purity of making—a physical process that does not hide behind illusionism—a directness wherein the materiality of the work is evident and … all the mystery is removed so that it is what it is."

Meyers has created site-specific wall drawings at cultural institutions including the Hammer Museum, The Phillips Collection, Hirshhorn Museum and Sculpture Garden and Columbus Museum (Georgia). She has also exhibited at the Baltimore Museum of Art, Corcoran Gallery of Art, Kreeger Museum and Tokyo Metropolitan Teien Art Museum. Her work belongs to the public collections of the Smithsonian American Art Museum, British Museum, Los Angeles County Museum of Art, National Gallery of Art and The Phillips Collection, among others. In 2023, Meyers received the Anonymous Was a Woman Award.

== Early life and career ==
Meyers was born in 1968 in Washington, DC and grew up in the DC area. After graduating high school, she lived for a year in Paris, France before moving to New York City to enroll at The Cooper Union. She completed a BFA in 1990, then moved to Oakland, California to attend the California College of the Arts where she earned an MFA in 1993. During her first professional decade, Meyers lived in New York City, New Haven, CT, North Carolina and Pittsburgh before returning to her native Washington in 2002.

In her early career, Meyers largely focused on landscape-based paintings that moved from ambiguously referential studies in tone and atmosphere to more abstract pieces in which loosely gridded brushstrokes created elusive, pulsing spaces. After turning to more drawing-based work in the early 2000s, she began receiving recognition for solo exhibitions at Gallery Joe (Philadelphia), The Frick Pittsburgh, the New Britain Museum of American Art and G Fine Art (Washington).

== Work and reception ==
Meyers's creative process relies equally on a meticulous, rigorous focus and an intuitive approach open to tiny slippages and imperfections of the human hand that take her compositions in unforeseen directions. Much of her work began with single flowing lines tracing predetermined frameworks of circles or simple gestures, which defined the direction in which each image evolved. Working without templates or tape, she then laid down successive strokes of acrylic ink, paint, pen or marker following the contours of the prior mark as if drafting a topographical chart. Each mark was a direct response building on the last, forming densely packed patterns in which inadvertent skips, bends and variations accumulate like the ripples of pebbles in a pond or ancient tree cross-sections. Describing the process, Artforum critic Annie Buckley wrote, "Meyers's drawing magnifies the scope and intensity of singular marks through expansive patternmaking; taken together, the lines appear to pulsate, embodying both the physicality of her process and that of the space."

Some observers link Meyers's approach to Agnes Martin and Anne Truitt in its attention to systematic structure and formal considerations, or to Vija Celmins due to its suggestions of natural phenomena. At a deeper level, however, critics contend that her works function like maps of time and space, evoking processes rather than things, and most concretely, serve as records of physical movement and their own becoming. In this sense, her work has an affinity to Jackson Pollock's form of mark-making as a trace or index of an event—a mode that shifts it from the purely abstract toward something approaching narrative or even realism.

Meyers's site-specific wall drawings enhance and magnify certain aspects of her overall work: its physicality, directness of materials, use of entropy, and themes of endurance, contemplation and impermanence. She creates them line by line in on-site over the course of days, weeks or months, often with spectators witnessing the effort and unfolding of the work. Her unrushed, methodical approach encourages a sense of reflection that runs counter to the increasing speed of contemporary life. Due to the large scale, viewers experience the drawings not just visually but also bodily, as immersive spaces in which they are situated. When an exhibition ends, these works are painted over, the impermanence putting a premium on the experience.

=== Early drawings, 2001–07 ===
Meyer first produced drawings based on simple, pre-determined systems in the early 2000s. In these works on Mylar, vellum and graph paper, she explored the consequences of a single drawn line that dictated the next. Reviewers likened them to a looser, organic form of minimalism or postminimalism. Artforum's Nord Wennerstrom wrote, "time is suspended, and the effect is meditative, blissful, and refreshing"; the Baltimore Sun deemed them "labor-intensive abstract mandalas … [with] a heroic ambition to limn the infinite through mark-making at the limits of perception."

=== Wall drawings ===
In the latter 2000s, Meyers extended her drawings to large-scale, non-permanent, wall works. She first created them in her studio, then at the University of Maryland Art Gallery (2009), San Jose Institute of Contemporary Art (2009) and Katzen Arts Center (2011), among others venues. The Phillips Collection commissioned a wall drawing in response to one of its van Gogh paintings: at the time being (2010), whose dense web of lines suggested immersion in the brushstrokes of the Dutch artist. This body of work is characterized by its undulating lines, limited color palettes, geometrically delineated areas, and responsiveness to the architecture, color and light of its sites.

Linn Meyers, Untitled, acrylic ink on panel, 78" x 66", 2019. Collection of Los Angeles County Museum of Art.

In 2011, Meyers created Every Now. And Again at the Hammer Museum over the course of 180 hours in twelve days. Inspired by the color and light of Los Angeles, the deep-violet and pale-yellow, roughly 100-foot-long work featured rolling swirls, curves and teardrop shapes made of multiple strokes, which appeared to tumble toward the bottom of the museum's lobby staircase. Critics described the forms as evocative of "ancient mysteries": undersea creatures, cyclical patterns of nature and life, and prehistoric cave drawings. In 2016, Meyers created Our View From Here (2016), a 400-foot-long drawing executed over 11 weeks that snaked through the Hirshhorn Museum's curving, circular second floor gallery; the title referenced the inability to see the work in its entirety. It consisted of eight segments (dictated by architectural elements)—each beginning with a circle or partial circle defined as an absence by thousands of sinuous lines flowing past and around it. The segments were unified by two bands of pale yellow and gray pigment that ran the length of the hallway on the upper and lower halves of the wall. Hyperallergic described the work as "lyrical, linear poetry," while Washington Post critic Mark Jenkins called it "a minimalist yet sweeping riff on the circle."

Let's Get Lost (Bowdoin College Museum of Art, 2018) was a wall drawing whose physical parameters determined the content of an invisible, participatory sound work, Listening Glass (created by Rebecca Bray, James Bigbee Garver and Josh Knowles). The sound piece enabled visitors to play the Meyers drawing like an instrument with their cell phones, uncovering audible music notes in the work that were heard in concert with sounds coming from speakers in the gallery.

=== Later drawings and paintings ===
Linn Meyers, Untitled, ink and acrylic gouache on vintage graph paper, 10.5" x 8", 2023.

Meyers's approach since 2013 has been characterized as a more intuitive one less structured by geometric constraints that straddles painting and drawing. Her works on paper and paintings on panel often employ a palette of deepened tonality with flat areas of color (often pale or deep blues) applied before drawing. During this period, she expanded her characteristic linear mark-making to include lines of dots whose patterns have been described as "resonant of cosmological terrains, geometric landscapes and geological maps."

In her early career, Meyers often worked out ideas and compositional elements for large works in small pieces on graph paper. Later, this work became a body of work in its own right. Her notebook-sized "Graph Paper Drawings" (2005–present) use the imposed grid of their surfaces as a platform for experimentation, shifting between organization and disorder to explore crease- and wrinkle-like images and oscillations between lines, voids and grid. They often include numbers and hole punches in the original paper, suggesting numerical dimensions and limits to the work's intimate, imagined spaces. Her "Text Reductions" (2020) used pages cut from a 1900 book of John Ruskin's writings on landscape painter J.M.W. Turner, from which she excised all but a few words, leaving behind geometric voids and spare, poetic messages evoking sublime emotions.

== Awards and collections ==
Meyers has received grants from the Pollock-Krasner Foundation (2001) and Fifth Floor Foundation (2004, 2007), a Smithsonian Artist Research fellowship (2009), a Santo Foundation award (2016), an Anonymous Was A Woman Award (2023), and nine DC Commission on the Arts and Humanities fellowships between 2008 and 2023. She has been awarded artist residencies at Ballinglen, the Bemis Center for Contemporary Arts, Bowdoin College, the Hirshhorn Museum, Hayama Residency (Japan), Iris Project, Millay Arts, San Jose Institute of Contemporary Art and Tamarind Institute.

Meyers's work belongs to the public collections of the Allentown Art Museum, AmorePacific Museum of Art (Korea), Ballinglen Museum of Art (Ireland), British Museum, Baltimore Museum of Art, Hammer Museum, Hirshhorn Museum, Kreeger Museum, Los Angeles County Museum of Art, National Gallery of Art, National Museum of Women in the Arts, New Britain Museum of American Art, Pennsylvania Academy of Fine Art, The Phillips Collection, Sheldon Museum of Art and Smithsonian American Art Museum, among others.
