= Elaine Reichek =

American visual artist

Elaine Reichek (born 1943) is a New York-based visual artist. Much of her work concerns the history of the embroidered sampler. Through her pieces of hand and machine embroidery and digital sewing machine, she addresses issues such as the craft/art and the old/new divide, the nature of women's work, and the interplay of text and image. The connection between the pixel and the stitch, as differently gendered types of mark-making, is a continuing theme in her work.

== Life and work ==
Elaine Reichek was born in Brooklyn, New York in 1943 to an American Jewish family. She received a BA from Brooklyn College in 1963 and BFA from Yale University in 1964, where she studied painting with Ad Reinhardt. She has created a wide body of work, including thread-based drawings, knitted pieces, and installations. In the 1990s she began to focus on needlework samplers, an object which combines image and text. Several of her series, including MADAMI'MADAM (2000–2002) and Ariadne's Thread (2008–2012), juxtapose famous quotes and lines of literature with hand- or digitally-embroidered images. The text relates narrative, drawing, and thread as parallel instances of linear structure. Her work tends to critique masculine traditions in modernist painting, as well as explore toward cultural assimilation and how family traditions form personal and cultural identity. Her work often features references to her Jewish heritage.

Reichek's work is held in the collections of the MoMA, The Jewish Museum, the Whitney Museum of American Art, and the Isabella Stewart Gardner Museum, among others.

On November 11, 2026, Reichek was awarded an Anonymous Was A Woman grant.

== Exhibitions ==
- Elaine Reichek. A Précis 1972-1995, Zach Feuer Gallery, New York, NY. 2013
- A Postcolonial Kinderhood Revisited, Jewish Museum, New York, NY. 2013
- Ariadne’s Thread, Shoshana Wayne Gallery, Santa Monica, CA. 2011
- "Pattern Recognition", Nicole Klagsbrun Gallery, New York, NY 2007
- MADAMI’MADAM, Isabella Stewart Gardner Museum, Boston, MA 2003
- At Home & in the World, Palais des Beaux-Arts, Brussels, Belgium and Tel Aviv Museum of Art, Israel 2000
- Projects 67: Elaine Reichek, Museum of Modern Art, New York, NY 1999
- "When This You See", Nicole Klagsbrun Gallery, New York, NY 1999
- A Postcolonial Kinderhood, Jewish Museum, New York, NY. Traveled to Contemporary Jewish Museum, San Francisco, CA and Wexner Center for the Arts, Columbus, OH. 1994
