= Victoria Sambunaris =

American artist

- Born: 1964; Lancaster, Pennsylvania, US
- Education: Mount Vernon College (BA); Yale University (M.F.A.)
- Occupation: Photographer
- Known for: Photographic journey traversing the American landscape
- Honors: Anonymous Was A Woman Award
- Website: victoriasambunaris.com/about

Victoria Sambunaris is an American photographer. Sambunaris was born in Lancaster, Pennsylvania.

== Education ==
Sambunaris earned her Bachelor of Arts from Mount Vernon College in 1986 and her Masters of Fine Arts from Yale University in 1999.

== Career ==
In 2010, she was awarded the Anonymous Was A Woman Award and was later hired by Yale University in 2012 as a lecturer in photography. In 2021, she was awarded a Guggenheim Fellowship.

== Collections ==
Her work is included in the collections of the Whitney Museum of American Art, the Museum of Modern Art, New York, the National Museum of Women in the Arts, and the San Francisco Museum of Modern Art.
