= Ritsuko Taho =

Japanese sculptor (born 1950)

- 田甫 律子
- Born: 1950 (age 75–76); Tokushima Prefecture, Japan
- Education: Tokushima University; Musashino Art University; Yale University
- Employer: Harvard University; MIT School of Architecture and Planning; Tokyo University of the Arts
- Awards: Guggenheim Fellow (1993); Anonymous Was A Woman Award (2010)

Ritsuko Taho (田甫 律子, Taho Ritsuko; born 1950) is a Japanese sculptor and installation artist. After moving to the United States, she got her MFA in Sculpture at Yale University and taught at Harvard University and MIT School of Architecture and Planning, before returning to Japan to become professor at the Tokyo University of the Arts Department of Intermedia. She is a 1993 Guggenheim Fellow and 2010 Anonymous Was A Woman Award winner.

== Biography ==
Taho was born in 1950 in Tokushima Prefecture. She was later educated at Tokushima University (where she got her BA in 1973); Musashino Art University (where she got her BFA in 1977 and MFA in Design in 1979), and Yale University (where she got her MFA in Sculpture in 1985). She was an artist-in-residence at the Fine Arts Work Center from 1985 to 1987, and she received several arts fellowships from the Asian Cultural Council (1986), Pollock-Krasner Foundation (1987), and the Massachusetts Artist Foundation (1991).

She worked as an art lecturer at Harvard University from 1987 to 1989, including at their Department of Visual and Environmental Studies; during her time there, she had an art project where her students would together adopt one chicken and then have it slaughtered and eaten and its bones turned into a sculpture. In 1987, an installation of hers was commissioned by the Brattleboro Museum and Art Center for their New Work Japan exhibition. In 1988, she set up Forbidden Building, an installation where she invited others to collect dead leaves to fill a large structure of chain-link fence and scaffolding nearby Ruggles station. She once worked with Jeffrey Spalding for the 1989 installation work Eye of Nature II.

In 1989, Taho moved to the Department of Architecture of the nearby MIT School of Architecture and Planning, where she was assistant professor of visual arts and an Ida Green Career Development Professor. In 1991, she did an installation at the Massachusetts College of Art, named On the Path, where she "links her Japanese father's enslavement to the Emperor with the slavery of the American South". In 1993, she was awarded a Guggenheim Fellow for sculpting, as well as a Bunting Institute Fellowship.

In 1994, her installation Multicultural Diplomats, where 40,000 inflated medical gloves, containing pieces of paper with the dreams of other people who wrote them down at her request, would be hung from the Margaret Mitchell House and Museum, was exhibited at the Arts Festival of Atlanta. On 17 September, Multicultural Diplomats was destroyed, alongside a majority of the building, when an arsonist ignited a fire by spilling kerosene across all three floors above ground. Taho recalled that "We had 40,000 dreams on the roof. I think that kind of fire could be seen as an indication that dreams can come true. The fire eternalized the dreams. It is almost like a god tried to take their dreams".

In 1995, she was promoted to associate professor at MIT. Artforum said that her 1995 exhibition Dawn: Transformation of Zero at Capp Street Project "examined our complex relationship with money". In 1996, she held an installation where Cambridge residents (reportedly including homeless people) would anonymously have their dreams engraved on her Dream Towers sculpture, with The Boston Globe calling her the city's "dream collector". In 2001, she organized an installation where pedestrians near an Amherst garage would read poetry, including from Amherst native Emily Dickinson. She later moved to the Tokyo University of the Arts Department of Intermedia and became a professor there. She won an Anonymous Was A Woman Award in 2000.

As of 1998, she resided in Boston.
