= Rocío Rodríguez =

Rocío Rodríguez was born in Cuba in 1952 and came to the United States in 1961. She is an abstract artist whose work relies heavily on expressive, gestural line and color. Her family first settled in Florida, then Kansas and finally in Georgia where she studied at the Lamar Dodd School of Art at the University of Georgia (BFA 1976, MFA, 1979). Artillery Magazine featured Rodríguez's artwork in 2015. Her work was described as "a language of scrapes, squiggles and large blemishes to express her perceptions of the environment." Rodríguez commented on the article to clear up some statements that were made regarding her work. Rodríguez was one of the 2018 Anonymous Was A Woman Award recipients. In addition she was one of fifteen national artists to be awarded a Joan Mitchell Foundation Fellowship in 2022.

== Inspirations ==
Abstract, gestural, and painterly, Rodríguez's works are subjective meditations drawn from memory and experience. Rodríguez cites her multicultural background as an important source of inspiration. Several pieces of her work are inspired by this central overarching question: "what is the nature of a specific thing, if it can be represented in various ways, even in opposing ways?". This query has led to an examination of her own creative process by dissecting the image down to its most essential forms. Pedestals, boxes of color, and fragments of paint are stacked within her canvases and drawings as a way of offering up an image that elevates the parts of the whole, thus building via deconstruction. Rodriguez's artwork aims at creating visual tension.

== Art ==
Rodríguez's body of work, Neither Here nor There was made after a residency in Marfa, Texas. The work in this exhibit is the direct result of her response to the open desert. The colors, light, and her mood filters through uneven stacks of vibrant rectangular and square shapes that spill and overflow with color. Rodríguez uses two elements: colors and lines. It offers two systems of denoting space and place; one is coloristic, ambiguous, the other is linear, harder edged, and provisionally clearer. Consisting of stacked sections to form blocks, each could be a mini-painting in its own right, their surfaces animated by a wild array of marks. Her palette is equally compelling as the glow of rose or gold-orange sweetens the grays, blacks, and whites. They are set against a rich ground of neutral shades that are subtly warmed and emit a low pervasive heat—arranged along the recessionals of an invisible one-point perspective diagram.

In her 2015 exhibition at Kathryn Markel Fine Arts, "Neither Here nor There", several paintings and drawings were exhibited which included Wet Cluster. This work shows overlaid, complex brushwork that is scratched, squiggled, smeared, melting into each other, the brilliance of orange-gold, forced back by small tautly outlined rectangles of grey and black. But the brightness seeps through and around them, in a beautiful orchestration. It represents the tangible raw energy that makes her process memorable. In this painting, florid pyramids of vigorously scratched surfaces, which might be mistaken for a child's uncontrolled rigor, capture the environmental assault on her sensibility and elicit a visceral reaction to her application of paint. Rodriguez’ seemingly reflexive marks combined with her flamboyant use of reds, yellows, mauves, greys, and black convey a palpable urgency and momentum. Here her uneven and fractured scores both confirm and deny order to great effect.
