= J. Morgan Puett =

American fashion designer

- Born: 1957 (age 67–68); Hahira, Georgia, U.S.
- Known for: Fashion design, fine art
- Awards: 2016 Guggenheim fellow
- Website: jmorganpuett.com

J. Morgan Puett (born 1957) is an American fashion designer and interdisciplinary contemporary artist. She first became known for her fashion designs and later for her contemporary art practice incorporating fashion.

== Life ==
Puett was born in Hahira, Georgia in 1957. Beekeeping was a family profession, with three of her siblings becoming beekeepers. She received her BFA in painting and sculpture from the School of the Art Institute of Chicago in 1981. She received an MFA degree in sculpture and experimental filmmaking from the same school in 1985.

== Creative career ==
Puett is a trans-disciplinary creative producer in the areas of installation art practices, clothing design, architecture, photography, and fine art.

=== Art practice ===
Her work uses conceptual tools including research-based methods in history, biology, new economies, design, craft and collaboration. Morgan's early work forged new territory by intervening into the fashion system with a series of storefront installations and clothing/dwelling/event projects in Manhattan, New York in the 1980s and 90s, then produced a long series of research installations on the histories of the needle trade systems in museums and festivals around the world. her practice has been innovative in that it has encouraged new forms of social engagement in art.

=== Fashion Work ===
Between 1985 and 1997, Puett was known for her "upscale depression era" fashion designs, sold through her New York boutique. When her final store closed in 1997, she held an exhibition of the leftover business items, such as cheques, business cards and unsold clothes, dipped in beeswax.

=== The RN Patch ===
In the early 2000s, the American Association of Nurses and the Center for Nurse Advocacy sought a means to better identify registered nurses in busy medical environments, in order to reduce confusion and help patients and others identify nurses quickly. In 2003, as part of the exhibition RN: The Past, Present, and Future of the Nurses' Uniform at The Fabric Workshop and Museum, Philadelphia. Pruett collaborated with Mark Dion to create a patch for registered nurses to wear on their uniforms. The patch, a simple square with the letters "RN", could be put on any scrubs and was considered a "simple, elegant solution".

=== Mildred's Lane Project ===
With Mark Dion, she is a founder of The Mildred's Lane Project, an experimental artist's residency program. Karen Archey, writing in Art in America, described Mildred's Lane as an "ongoing experiment in pedagogy, a social space, a site for artistic and architectural intervention, a residency program, and home to Puett..." Located on a 96-acre farm in rural Berlin Township Pennsylvania, the residency focuses on social and political practice in the arts.

== Awards ==
Puett has been awarded the John and Marva Warnock award 2014, the United States Artists Simon Fellow Award 2011, the Smithsonian Institution Artist Research Fellowship 2009, and the Anonymous Was A Woman Award and the PEI in Philadelphia award, both in 2005. In 2016 she received a Guggenheim Fellowship.

== Exhibitions ==
Puett exhibits, lectures and teaches extensively in venues that include MoMA, New York (2012–13); Musashimo Art University, Tokyo (2012); Contemporary Art Center, Tbilisi, Republic of Georgia (2012); Creative Time, NYC (2011); Queens Museum of Art, NYC (2010); MoMA, NYC (2010); The School of the Art Institute of Chicago (2008); University of Venice, Italy (2005); American Fine Arts Co., NYC (2004); ARTEX, Arnheim, Netherlands (2004); WaveHill, Bronx, NYC; The Fabric Workshop and Museum of Philadelphia (2003–04); Mass MoCA, Ma. (2004); Spoleto, USA, Charleston, SC, (2002); The Serpentine Gallery & Victoria and Albert Museum, London (2001).

== Collections ==
Puett's work is in the Tate Modern in London, The Fabric Workshop and Museum of Philadelphia and the Philadelphia Museum of Art. Her work is also included in the permanent collection of the Hirshhorn Museum at the Smithsonian Institution.

== See also ==
- Suzanne Lacy
- Ann Hamilton (artist)
