= Takako Yamaguchi =

Los-Angeles based contemporary artist

- Born: 1952 (age 73–74); Okayama, Japan
- Education: University of California at Santa Barbara, M.F.A. (1978)
- Known for: Painting

Takako Yamaguchi (born 1952, Okayama, Japan) is a visual artist based in Los Angeles, California.

== Background ==
Born in Okayama, Japan, Takako Yamaguchi has lived and has long lived and worked in Los Angeles. During the early years of her practice, Yamaguchi moved between Japan, the U.S. Yamaguchi first studied at the International Christian University in Tokyo, Japan (1971–1973). She received her B.A. from Bates College in 1975, and went on to get her MFA from the University of California, Santa Barbara in 1978.

== Visual practice ==
Yamaguchi has been associated with the U.S.-based Pattern and Decoration movement of the 1970s. Her work embraces what has historically been disfavored by the formal reductivism of Euro-American abstraction and modernism. Decoration, fashion, beauty, sentimentality, empathy, and pleasure–forms and styles displaced by modernism and the contemporary artistic zeitgeist, are central aspects of Yamaguchi's painting practice. Through her proposed "poetics of dissent," Yamaguchi recuperates and mixes various visual traditions including Mexican Socialist Muralism, American Transcendentalism, Art Nouveau, and Japanese decorative arts. Her syncretic approach challenges the binary of an ostensibly race-neutral kind of International Modernism and the aesthetics of local, national and ethnic identity. Yamaguchi's "abstractions in reverse," a current that runs throughout the artist's practice, works backwards in the traditional historical framework of 20th century western art, from abstraction back towards illusionism. Her work involves the exploration of the semi-abstract, as well as focusing on pattern and surface quality through the use of bronze leaf.

== Exhibitions ==
Yamaguchi has had solo exhibitions at Ortuzar Projects, New York (2023); Ramiken Crucible, New York (2021); Egan and Rosen, New York (2021); STARS Gallery, Los Angeles (2021); as-is.la, Los Angeles (2021) (2019) (2018); Cardwell Jimmerson Contemporary Art, Los Angeles (2008); Nevada Museum, Reno (2007); Kathryn Markel Fine Arts (2007); and Jan Baum Gallery, Los Angeles (2006). Her work has been exhibited in several museum surveys including The Ocean, Bergen Kunsthall, Norway (2021); With Pleasure: Pattern and Decoration in American Art 1972–1985, Museum of Contemporary Art, Los Angeles and Hessel Museum of Art, Center for Curatorial Studies at Bard College, Annandale-on-Hudson, New York (2019–2021); Transcendence: Abstraction & Symbolism in the American West, Nora Eccles Harrison Museum of Art, Logan, Utah (2015); California Echoes: Women Inspired by Nature, Orange County Center for Contemporary Art, California (2007); and L.A. Post-Cool at the San Jose Museum of Art, California (2002).

In Yamaguchi's most recent works at the Whitney Biennial 2024, her newest works comprise zigzags, tubes, and lines that is related to the weather and other inspirations from nature. She calls "abstraction in reverse", incorporating patterns such as clouds and waves but in a way that is expressed through an artist's vision and not with nature itself.

The Museum of Contemporary Art in Los Angeles is presenting a solo exhibition, “MOCA Focus: Takako Yamaguchi” during the 2025-26 season. The exhibition was accompanied by a catalog of the same name with text by Anna Katz.

== Awards and honors ==
In 2008, Yamaguchi was awarded with a fellowship for visual art from the California Community Foundation. Yamaguchi received an Anonymous Was a Woman award in 2024, as well as a grant from the Foundation for Contemporary Art and a Stepping Stone grant from the Trellis Art Fund in the same year.

== Collections ==
Yamaguchi's work is in the collections of the Nora Eccles Harrison Museum of Art; Long Beach Museum of Art, California; Eli Broad Family Foundation, Los Angeles; the Bates College Museum of Art, Maine; Art Bridges Foundation, Arkansas; the Nevada Museum, Reno; the Lynda and Stuart Resnick Collection, Los Angeles; and Deutsche Bank, New York, among others.
