= Susan Unterberg =

American contemporary photographer and philanthropist

- Born: 1941 (age 84–85); New York City, New York
- Education: Sarah Lawrence College, BFA (1977); New York University, MA (1985)
- Known for: Photography
- Movement: Contemporary art
- Website: www.susanunterberg.net

Susan Unterberg (born 1941) is an American contemporary photographer and philanthropist. Her work often focuses on themes of familial relationships and nature, and it is included in several permanent collections of major museums across the United States. In 2018, she stepped forward as the founder and funder of the Anonymous Was A Woman Award.

== Life ==
Unterberg was born in 1941 in New York City, New York, USA. In an interview, Unterberg stated that, during her childhood, she hadn't been "encouraged to become an artist or generally to have career ambitions, [...] It was a time when women got their names in the paper when they got married or died." Despite this, Unterberg pursued her art education when her two daughters were "school-aged." She graduated from Sarah Lawrence College with a Bachelor of Fine Arts in 1977 and received a Master of Arts from New York University in 1985.

Unterberg has received various fellowships, including from the New York Foundation for the Arts in 1992 and the MacDowell Colony in 1995. In 1996, she was named a visiting artist at the American Academy in Rome.

Once a guest artist at the artist colony Yaddo, Unterberg was named as its co-chairwoman with A. M. Homes in 2013. She credited Yaddo as a place where she had worked and grown as an artist.

As of 2018, Unterberg lives in New York City.

== Work ==
Unterberg usually separates her work by subject into discrete series. Her earlier work includes emotional portraits of familial relationships that explore the psychological bonds and connections between family members, while her later work consists of more abstract landscapes and portraits of animals which emphasize light, color, and metaphor. Unterberg is known for her diptych studies Mothers and Daughters and Fathers and Sons, which photographically explore family relationships.

As of 2018, Unterberg's projects involve layering photographic work in Adobe Photoshop, which she describes as "self-portraits that deal with the [current American] political situation."

Unterberg's photographic work has been exhibited at the New Museum of Contemporary Art, the International Center of Photography, the Metropolitan Museum of Art, the Jewish Museum, New York and the Los Angeles County Museum of Art.

== Collections ==
Unterberg's work is included in the permanent collection of the Museum of Modern Art, New York, the Metropolitan Museum of Art, the Los Angeles County Museum of Art, the Jewish Museum, New York, and the Nelson-Atkins Museum of Art.

== Philanthropy ==
Unterberg and her sister inherited a significant amount of money from their father Nathan Appleman, a businessman in the oil industry, upon his death in 1992.

In July 2018, Unterberg revealed herself as the founder and sole funder of the Anonymous Was A Woman Award. Between 1996 and 2024, more than 300 underrecognized female artists over the age of 40 wonti the award, with grants totally more than $6.5 million dollars. This award is "an unrestricted grant of $25,000 awarded each year to ten women artists" who have reached a critical point in their careers.Beginning in 2022, Anonymous Was A Woman additionally disburses an environmental arts grant.

Before 2018, she had remained anonymous so that her artwork would be evaluated in its own context, without being influenced by her contributions. In an interview, she described her reasons for coming forward, stating "It’s a great time for women to speak up. I feel I can be a better advocate having my own voice," and that she can now work openly to further the organization's cause and to encourage philanthropists and women artists. On top of the grant award program, Unterberg is considering other forms of programs, possibly seminars, to add balance to the organization.

In 2025, the Grey Art Museum at New York University celebrated the award with their exhibition, Anonymous Was A Woman: The First 25 Years, featuring works by some of the recipients from 1996-2020. A related publication, Anonymous Was A Woman: The First 25 Years, featuing works by all the recipients from 1996-2020, was published on January 1, 2025, by the Grey Art Museum and Hirmer Verlag. Anonymous Was A Woman also published and commissioned an Artist Survey during the time of the exhibition, to look at women artists' lives and careers and the factors contributing to their success and challenges. It culminated in "The Artists Speak Report."

== Bibliography ==
- Berg, Niki; Mackenzie, Elizabeth; Isaak, Jo Anna; Gurney, Janice; Unterberg, Susan (1989). Mothers of invention: Niki Berg, Janice Gurney, Elizabeth Mackenzie, Mary Scott, May Stevens, Susan Unterberg. Geneva, N.Y.?: Houghton House Gallery, Hobart and William Smith Colleges?.
- Bober, Andrée; Unterberg, Susan; Ellegood, Anne; Isaak, Jo Anna; Contemporary Arts Center (Cincinnati, Ohio); Chrysler Museum (2004). Susan Unterberg: a retrospective. Cincinnati: Contemporary Arts Center. ISBN 978-0-917562-76-1.
- Collins, Connie (2002). 50 celebrate 50: fifty extraordinary women talk about facing, turning, and being fifty. Des Moines, Iowa: Meredith Books. ISBN 978-0-696-21390-8.
- Cruger, George; Virginia Museum of Fine Arts (1987). Portrait: faces of the '80s. Richmond: Virginia Museum of Fine Arts.
- Faust, Daniel; Tucker, Marcia; New Museum of Contemporary Art (New York, N.Y.) (1986). Past, present, future. New York: New Museum of Contemporary Art.
- Isaak, Jo Anna; Silverthorne, Jeanne; Tucker, Marcia; Ezra and Cecile Zilkha Gallery (1995). Laughter ten years after. Geneva, N.Y.: Hobart and William Smith Colleges Press. ISBN 978-0-910969-02-4.
- Isaak, Jo Anna; Western Gallery (Western Washington University) (2002). H₂0. Geneva, N.Y.: Hobart and William Smith Colleges Press. ISBN 978-0-934888-18-9.
- Tucker, Marcia; Ellegood, Anne; New Museum of Contemporary Art (New York, N.Y.) (1999). The time of our lives: exhibition. New York: New Museum of Contemporary Art. ISBN 978-0-915557-83-7.
- Unterberg, Susan; Cole, Henri (1999). Double takes. New York: Metropolitan Museum of Art.
- Unterberg, Susan (1993). Portrait of Nicholas Hasluck.
- Unterberg, Susan; Parry, Eugenia; Yancey Richardson Gallery (1998). Susan Unterberg: water dreams. New York: Yancey Richardson Gallery.
- Unterberg, Susan; Schaffner, Ingrid; Dee, D. James; Robert Klein Gallery (2000). Susan Unterberg: white horse. Boston, MA: Robert Klein Gallery.
- "Susan Unterberg". Bomb BOMB (14): 48–49. 1986. ISSN 0743-3204.
