= Deborah Roberts (visual artist) =

American visual artist (born 1962)

- Born: November 1962 (age 63); Austin, Texas, U.S.
- Education: University of North Texas (BFA); Syracuse University (MFA)
- Occupation: Visual artist
- Known for: Contemporary art; Painting; Collage
- Website: deborahrobertsart.com

Deborah Roberts (born 1962) is an American contemporary artist. Roberts is a mixed media collage artist whose figurative works depict the complexity of Black subjecthood and explores themes of race, identity, and gender politics taking on the subject of otherness as understood against the backdrop of existing societal norms of race and beauty. Roberts was named 2023 Texas Medal of Arts Award Honoree for the Visual Arts. She lives in Austin, Texas.

== Early life and education ==
Deborah Roberts was born in 1962, in Austin, Texas. She received a BFA degree from the University of North Texas in Denton, Texas; and a MFA degree from Syracuse University in Syracuse, New York.

== Work ==
Roberts’s work challenges the existing notion of a universal beauty, arguing instead for a more inclusive and subjective understanding of visual culture. By combining found and manipulated images with hand drawn and painted details, Roberts leverages the artistic practice of collage to uplift and dimensionalize her subjects, often taking the form of young girls and, more increasingly, Black boys. The boys and girls who populate her work, while invariably bound to the complicated the problematic narratives defining American, African American and art history, are, at the same time, free and able to forge their own paths and form their own identities.

== Exhibitions ==
Her work has been exhibited internationally across the US and Europe. Roberts’s work is in the collections of the Whitney Museum of American Art, New York; Brooklyn Museum, New York; The Studio Museum in Harlem, New York; and Los Angeles County Museum of Art, California.

The show "Deborah Roberts: I’m" traveled to the Contemporary Austin, the Museum of Contemporary Art Denver, Art + Practice in Los Angeles, and the Cummer Museum of Art and Gardens. She has also exhibited at Spelman College Museum of Fine Art, Atlanta, Georgia; LACMA, Los Angeles, California; Blanton Museum of Art, Austin, Texas; and the Virginia Museum of Fine Arts, Richmond, Virginia, among various other institutions.

Roberts’s work was included in the 2022 exhibition Women Painting Women at the Modern Art Museum of Fort Worth.

== Collections ==
Roberts's work is in the collections of:

- Museum of Fine Art, Boston, Massachusetts
- Institute of Contemporary Art, Boston, Massachusetts
- Scottish National Galleries, Scotland, UK
- SFMoMA, San Francisco, California
- Blanton Museum of Art, Austin, Texas
- Block Museum of Art, Evanston, Illinois
- Brooklyn Museum, New York City, New York
- The Frances Young Tang Teaching Museum and Art Gallery at Skidmore College, Saratoga Springs, New York
- Los Angeles County Museum of Art, Los Angeles, California
- Montclair Art Museum, Montclair, New Jersey
- Pérez Art Museum Miami, Miami, Florida
- Spelman College Museum of Art, Atlanta, Georgia
- The Studio Museum in Harlem, New York City, New York
- Virginia Museum of Fine Arts, Richmond, Virginia
- Whitney Museum of American Art, New York City, New York

== Awards ==
Roberts was selected to participate in the Robert Rauschenberg Residency (2019) and is a recipient of the Anonymous Was A Woman Grant (2018), the Pollock-Krasner Foundation Grant (2016), and the Ginsburg-Klaus Award Fellowship (2014).

Year	Award received	Location
2023	Texas Metal of Arts Honoree for Visual Art	Texas Cultural Trust, Texas, U.S.
2019	Outwin Boochever Portrait Competition, finalist	National Portrait Gallery, Washington, D.C., U.S.
2018	Anonymous Was a Woman	New York City, New York, U.S.
2017	Artist of the Year	Austin, Texas, U.S.
2016	Pollock-Krasner Foundation, Grantee	New York City, New York, U.S.
2014	SU MFA Exhibition “Best in Show”, Syracuse University Graduate Research Fellow (2011–2014)	New York, U.S.
2008	Artist of the Year	Austin, Texas, U.S.
1991	President Point of Light Recipient, President George H. Bush	Texas, U.S.
