= Shirley Woodson =

American artist (born 1936)

- Born: 1936 (age 89–90); Pulaski, Tennessee
- Education: B.F.A., M.F.A, further graduate studies at the School of the Art Institute of Chicago (1960), independent study in Rome, Paris, and Stockholm (1962)
- Alma mater: Wayne State University
- Known for: Fine arts paintings, collage. Portraits and figurative paintings depict her life, the environment, and African American history
- Spouse: Edsel B. Reid (d. 2000)
- Children: Khari and Senghor Reid
- Awards: MacDowell Colony Fellowship (1966–67), Alain Locke Award from the Friends of African and African American Art (1998), Kresge Eminent Artist (2021)

Shirley Woodson (born 1936) is an American visual artist, educator, mentor, and art collector who is most known for her spectacular figurative paintings depicting African American history. Her work that spans a career of 60 years and counting can be found in the collections of the Detroit Institute of Arts, the Charles H. Wright Museum of African American History, and the Studio Museum in Harlem, among other institutions. Woodson was named the 2021 Kresge Eminent Artist. The Detroit Institute of Arts exhibited 11 of her pieces in "Shirley Woodson: Shield of the Nile" Dec. 18, 2021 through June 12, 2022, the museum's first solo exhibition of Woodson's work. A painting by Woodson is featured in the Museum of Contemporary Art Detroit exhibition "Ground Up: Reflections on Black Abstraction" April 8-August 16, 2022.

== Early life and education ==
Born in 1936 in Pulaski, Tennessee, Woodson has lived in Detroit since she was three months old, when her parents - Claude E. Woodson and Celia Trotter Woodson moved their family of four. In seventh grade, she was selected to participate in a weekly special arts training at the Detroit Institute of Arts, where she would go on to take classes each Saturday, through high school. "It was sort of my most favorite place to be. Whenever I left home, I wanted to go to the museum," Woodson recalls in the 2021 Kresge Foundation Eminent Artist monograph.

She earned her B.F.A. degree from Wayne State University in 1958 and her M.A. from there in 1966. Between earning her B.F.A. and M.A., Woodson did graduate work at the School of the Art Institute of Chicago (1960) and pursued independent study in Rome, Paris, and Stockholm (1962).

== Career ==
Woodson debuted her work in a show of Michigan artists at the Detroit Institute of Arts in 1960, the same year she started teaching in the Detroit Public Schools. She has participated exhibitions at institutions including the Academy of Arts and Letters in New York, the Oakland Museum in California, and other venues as far away as Dakar, Senegal, and Lagos, Nigeria, featuring in over 30 solo exhibitions.

Woodson is one of ten Black artists and the only female profiled in "Harold Neal and Detroit African American Artists, 1945 Through the Black Arts Movement" by art historian Julia R. Myers. Woodson is also featured in The Art of Black American Women: Works of Twenty-Four Artists of the Twentieth Century (McFarland Publishing, 1993) and Gumbo Ya Ya: Anthology of Contemporary African-American Women Artists (Midmarch Arts Press, 1995), among other books and publications.

During her MacDowell Colony Fellowship (1966-1967), Woodson explored new ideas and techniques including collage, a medium that she continues to use as both a counterpoint and complement to her paintings.

Woodson taught at Highland Park Community College in Highland Park, Michigan from 1966 to 1978. From 1979 until 1992, she worked as an art specialist in Highland Park Schools. Woodson returned to Detroit Public Schools as supervisor of fine arts from 1992 to 2008.

In 1974, Woodson co-founded the Michigan chapter of the National Conference of Artists (NCA), the longest-running national arts organization for black visual artists. She is an executive board member with the national organization and is the president of the Michigan chapter. Woodson is also a member of the Detroit Art Teachers Association, the College Art Association, the National Art Education Association and the Michigan Art Education Association.

Woodson has influenced generations of Detroit artists. She is recognized in her city as "having lived a life dedicated to uplifting the beauty of Black art and breaking barriers of exclusion along the way," per Nichole Christian in the Kresge Eminent Artist monograph. Painter, College of Creative Studies professor, and inaugural Kresge Artist Fellow Gilda Snowden (1954-2014) is one of many who benefitted from her mentorship and advocacy. The 28-piece exhibition at the Detroit Artists Market in fall 2021, "Shirley Woodson: Why Do I Delight" (its name from a poem Woodson wrote in tribute to her husband, who died in 2000) included six pieces by her proteges including Elizabeth Youngblood, Dwight Smith, and Kimberly Harden. An exhibit that opened at Michigan State University in 2021, "Harold Neal and Detroit African American Artists: 1945 through the Black Arts Movement," featured Woodson's painting, "Martha’s Vandellas" (1969).

To the Detroit Institute of Arts exhibition "Detroit Collects" (2019), which featured 60 works of all mediums from 19 Detroit-area art collectors, Woodson and her husband Edsel Reid, an art collector and arts administrator, loaned from their collection “After Manet, from May Days Long Forgotten,” 2002, Carrie Mae Weems, American, digital chromogenic print. Woodson's husband Edsel was known throughout Detroit for his passionate promotion of African American art including jazz.

== Awards ==
Woodson's most recent honor was in 2021, when she was named the Kresge Eminent Artist. Administered by the College for Creative Studies, this award honors one Detroit artist each year for professional achievements, cultural contributions, and commitment to the local arts community. She received the DIA Alain Locke Award in 1998 and the Delta Sigma Theta sorority Lillian Benbow Award, among other awards.

Woodson is also the recipient of the Detroit Council or the Arts and the New Initiatives for the Arts Exhibition Grant, NCA Award for Artistic Excellence (1977); World Who's Who of Women, 1978; Who's Who in American Art, 1977–78; Award for Artistic Excellence, National Conference of Artists, 1977; Who's Who Among Black Americans, 1977; a prestigious MacDowell Fellowship in 1966. 2nd Prize, watercolor, Michigan State Fair, 1966; Purchase Prize, print and drawing exhibit, Dulin Gallery of Art, Knoxville, TN, 1965; 1st Prize, painting, Detroit Art Teachers Exhibition, 1965; 2nd Prize, painting, Detroit Art Teachers Exhibition, 1964.

== Collections ==
Woodson’s paintings are in 23 collections including the Detroit Institute of Arts, the Studio Museum in Harlem, the Charles H. Wright Museum of African American History in Detroit, the Mott-Warsh Collection of Contemporary Art in Flint, Michigan, the Schomburg Center for Research in Black Culture in New York City, the Museum of the National Center for Afro American Artists in Boston, Detroit Edison, the [ Hirshhorn Museum] in Washington, D.C, the Toledo Art Commission, Florida A&M University, and Seagrams.
