= Trisha Baga =

American artist (born 1985)

Trisha Baga (born 1985 Venice, Florida) is an American artist living and working in New York City. Her work is installation based and incorporates video, performance, and found objects.

== Career ==
Beginning in 2012 Baga began to use 3D projectors and 3D glasses for a more immersive effect as exhibited at West Street Gallery. In 2015 she added clay sculptures to her exhibitions, an outgrowth of her involvement with the ceramics club, a loosely gathered group of artists who meet at Greenwich House Pottery. Some of her earlier works, such as Madonna y El Niño (2010–2011) involved Baga performing in front of and along with her projections, but by her 2012-13 solo exhibition Plymouth Rock 2 at the Whitney Museum of American Art, she began using found objects (sometimes altered—as with a boom box painted with textured paint) in front of her projections in installations where she viewed "all things in the projection as bodies," preferring the "natural frequency" and one-sided/directional qualities of existing objects over the self-contained nature of sculpture. Her Solo exhibitions include: Orlando at Greene Naftali, New York (2015); Gravity at Peep-Hole, Milan (2013); Florida at Société, Berlin (2013); Plymouth Rock 2 at Whitney Museum of American Art, New York (2012); and The Biggest Circle at Greene Naftali, New York (2011). Her work is collected internationally and is in the permanent collection of the Whitney Museum of American Art, New York. She has received a Louis Comfort Tiffany Foundation Award (2012). On November 11, 2026, Baga was awarded an Anonymous Was A Woman grant.

== Education ==
Trisha Baga attended Cooper Union, receiving her Bachelor of Fine arts in 2007. She received her MFA from Milton Avery Graduate School of the Arts at Bard College in 2010.

== Work ==
Baga's videos and installations are non-linear in nature, often rejecting overt narratives and using a visually cacophonous, arguably psychedelic, aesthetic and humor to explore pathos, gender identity, environmental issues, pop culture, and more. Art critic Roberta Smith touches on themes in Baga's work in her review of the exhibition Orlando in the New York Times, writing, "Here Ms. Baga crosses Orlando, Fla., with 'Orlando,' Virginia Woolf’s novel of same-sex love and gender fluidity; people on a cruise ship; and, according to the gallery news release, at least, catastrophic global warming." Baga sees her distancing from narrative as being related to her attitude toward progress, "I have issues with progress – the concept of it, the stretch towards it, the motivations behind it, and its psychological implications, especially in regard to America and American history and ideals. It seems like an insatiable hunger, or an excuse to take things away from other people. I think it is also related to how I’ve been stepping away from narrative video, or at least making an attempt to curve an abstraction of the arc, back into a circle. A straight line is often the least efficient way to get anywhere." While topics and imagery shift depending on the work, this meandering approach to storytelling and layered approach to installation weave through the artist's oeuvre to date.

== Exhibitions ==
=== Selected solo exhibitions ===
- 2015 Orlando, Greene Naftali, New York, NY
- 2014 Trisha Baga, Zabludowicz Collection, London
- 2014 FREE INTERNET, Gio Marconi, Milan
- 2013 Gravity, Peep-Hole at Fonderia Battaglia, Milan
- 2013 Florida, Société Berlin
- 2012 The Biggest Circle, Greene Naftali, New York
- 2012 Plymouth Rock 2, Whitney Museum of American Art, New York
- 2012 World Peace, Kunstverein Munich, Munich

=== Selected group exhibitions ===
- 2015 Co-Workers The Network as Artist, Musée d’Art Moderne de la Ville de Paris, Paris, France
- 2015 Strange Pilgrims, The Contemporary Austin, Austin, TX
- 2015 The New Human: You and I in Global Wonderland, Moderna Museet, Malmö
- 2014 Private Settings: Art After the Internet, Museum of Modern Art, Poland, Warsaw
- 2014 Dark Velocity, CCS Bard, Annondale-on-Hudson, New York
- 2013 Freak Out, Greene Naftali, New York, NY
- 2013 Meanwhile... Suddenly and Then, Lyon Biennale, Lyon, France
- 2012 New Pictures of Common Objects, MOMA PS1, New York, NY
- 2011 The Great White Way Goes Black, Vilma Gold, London, England
- 2011 Fernando, Franklin Street Works, Stamford, Connecticut
- 2010 Beside Himself, Ditch Projects, Springfield, OR
