= Hanneline Røgeberg =

Norwegian artist (born 1963)

- Born: 19 September 1963 (age 63); Oslo, Norway
- Education: Oslo University (examen philosophicum); San Francisco Art Institute (BFA); Yale School of Art (MFA)
- Occupation: Artist
- Awards: Guggenheim Fellowship (1999)

Hanneline Røgeberg (born 19 September 1963) is a Norwegian artist based in the United States. A 1999 Guggenheim Fellowship, her work involves women’s bodies and World War II trauma. She is also a professor at the Mason Gross School of the Arts.

== Biography ==
Røgeberg was born on 19 September 1963 in Oslo. After obtaining her examen philosophicum at Oslo University in 1983, she obtained a BFA in Painting from the San Francisco Art Institute in 1987 (or 1988) and an MFA in Painting and Printmaking from the Yale School of Art in 1990. She also studied at the Yale Norfolk School of Art in 1987 and the Skowhegan School of Painting and Sculpture in 1988.

Røgeberg worked at Yale University as a painting lecturer (1991-1993) and as a critic (1993), before joining the University of Washington as an assistant professor of painting in 1993. In 1996, she moved to the Mason Gross School of the Arts, where she started with the same position. She was eventually promoted to full professor. She was a 1991 Ingram Merrill Foundation Fellow and a 1996 National Endowment for the Arts Fellow.

In 1999, Røgeberg was awarded a Guggenheim Fellowship for painting. Her painting, Pink Matters, appeared at the Whitney Museum of American Art's 1999 exhibition Zero G: When Gravity Becomes Form; William Zimmer of The New York Times noted a contrast between her depiction of "two Junoesque women keeping each other from falling" with Helène Aylon's bursting of a growing paint balloon. She also held a solo exhibition at the Henie Onstad Kunstsenter that same year. In April 2000, she held a solo show of five small paintings at Wittmann Lawrence Gallery in Vancouver; Michael Scott of the Vancouver Sun called them "pure and humbling", remarking that they were characterized by distorted human parts with gauzier brushwork. She was awarded the Anonymous Was A Woman Award in 2003. She was one of three women painters featured at Penny Park's Three Voices 2004 exhibition at Wright State University Art Galleries; Ron Rollins of the Dayton Daily News said that her "figures look serene in countenance but are arranged in almost surreal discomfort".

Røgeberg's exhibition Off the Bone was put on view at the Blackston Gallery from 12 September to 31 October 2015; Eric Sutphin of The Brooklyn Rail noted that resistance towards Nazi Germany's occupation of her native Norway features throughout the exhibition's works. Tom McGlynn, also of The Brooklyn Rail, called her 2015 piece Petroleum Soul Pile-Up, an installation where she repeats the same depicted oil stain "on mounds of sheepskin strewn haphazardly on the floor nearby", an example of the presence of large creative leeway "between different material iterations and an artist's consistent vision".

Scott admitted that her work "always been compelling, as translucent and bright as life itself." She had shifted towards smaller paintings with "an even fuller, deeper connection with the human spirit" by 2000, and as Rollins noted, Rogeberg's oil paintings tend to depict women's bodies distorted "in fantastically contorted positions that defy gravity or nature." Another theme present in her work is the trauma of World War II, particularly in the 2010s.

Originally based in Hoboken, New Jersey, in 1999, Røgeberg was living in New York by 2004. She now lives in Brooklyn, where she also works as an artist.
