= Paula Hayes =

American artist

Paula Hayes (born 1958 in Concord, Massachusetts) is an American visual artist and designer who works with sculpture, drawing, installation art, and landscape design. Hayes lived and worked in New York City for over two decades and currently lives in Athens, NY since 2013. Hayes is known for her terrariums and other living artworks, as well as her large-scale public and private landscapes. A major theme in Hayes' work is the connection of people to the natural environment. Hayes encourages a direct and tactile experience with her work as well as engagement with an evolving relationship to growing and maintaining large- and small-scale ecosystems.

== Early life and career ==
Hayes lived on a farm as a teenager in Upstate New York. She received a MFA from Parsons The New School for Design in New York City in 1989 and a BS from Skidmore College in Saratoga Springs, New York in 1987. While studying at Parsons, she started a gardening business. In the early nineties, Hayes began exhibiting her work in galleries throughout New York City, including Fawbush Gallery, AC Project Room, White Columns, and Andrea Rosen Gallery.

Hayes currently works in Athens, NY.

== Work ==
=== Materials ===
Hayes' work uses living plants and soil; sculptural forms made of hand blown glass, cast bronze, cast aluminum, cast silicone, cast acrylic, welded steel and aluminum, and hand weaving.

Hayes also uses 3D rendering programs and works with fabricators to manufacture her large-scale sculptures.

=== Philosophy ===
For her living artworks, Hayes relies on caregivers within the gallery or museum (or, in the case of works in private collections, the collectors themselves) to help maintain the artworks. She considers this collaboration with the caregiver/curator an elemental aspect of her work; she created an "Agreement for A Living Artwork" to ensure that the owner is committed to caring for the work.

Other works invite tactile ongoing engagement that is not in the control of the artist over time.

== Exhibitions ==
Hayes has exhibited in New York City at the Museum of Modern Art, Lever House, the Fawbush Gallery, Salon 94, and Marianne Boesky Gallery; the Tang Museum in Saratoga Springs, New York; the Wexner Center for the Arts in Columbus, Ohio; the Museum of Contemporary Art, Los Angeles; the Schaffhausen Museum in Schaffhausen, Switzerland; Galerie fur Landscaftkunst in Hamburg, Germany; The Patricia Low Galerie in Gstaad, Switzerland; and Eigen and Art in Berlin, Germany, among many others.

== Collections ==
Notable collectors of Hayes's work include Aby Rosen, Alberto Mugrabi, David Zwirner, Jeanne Greenberg Rohatyn, Marianne Boesky, and Daniel and Margaret Loeb.

== Private landscapes ==
Clients who have commissioned private landscapes include Hauser & Wirth Gallery in New York, W Hotel in Miami, Bauhaus University in Weimar, Germany, Marianne Boesky, Jeanne Greenberg Rohatyn and Nicholas Rohatyn, Rafael and Diana Viñoly, David and Monica Zwirner, Mickey and Jeanne Klein, Andrea Rosen, and Jill Stuart and Ron Curtis.

== Honors and awards ==
Hayes was nominated for a Cooper-Hewitt National Design Museum Design Award in Landscape Design in 2009, and in LandscapeArchitecture and Design Mind in 2011.

She has design patents registered for three of her products in the US, the EU and Canada, awarded in 2010 and 2011.
