= Jen Liu =

American visual artist

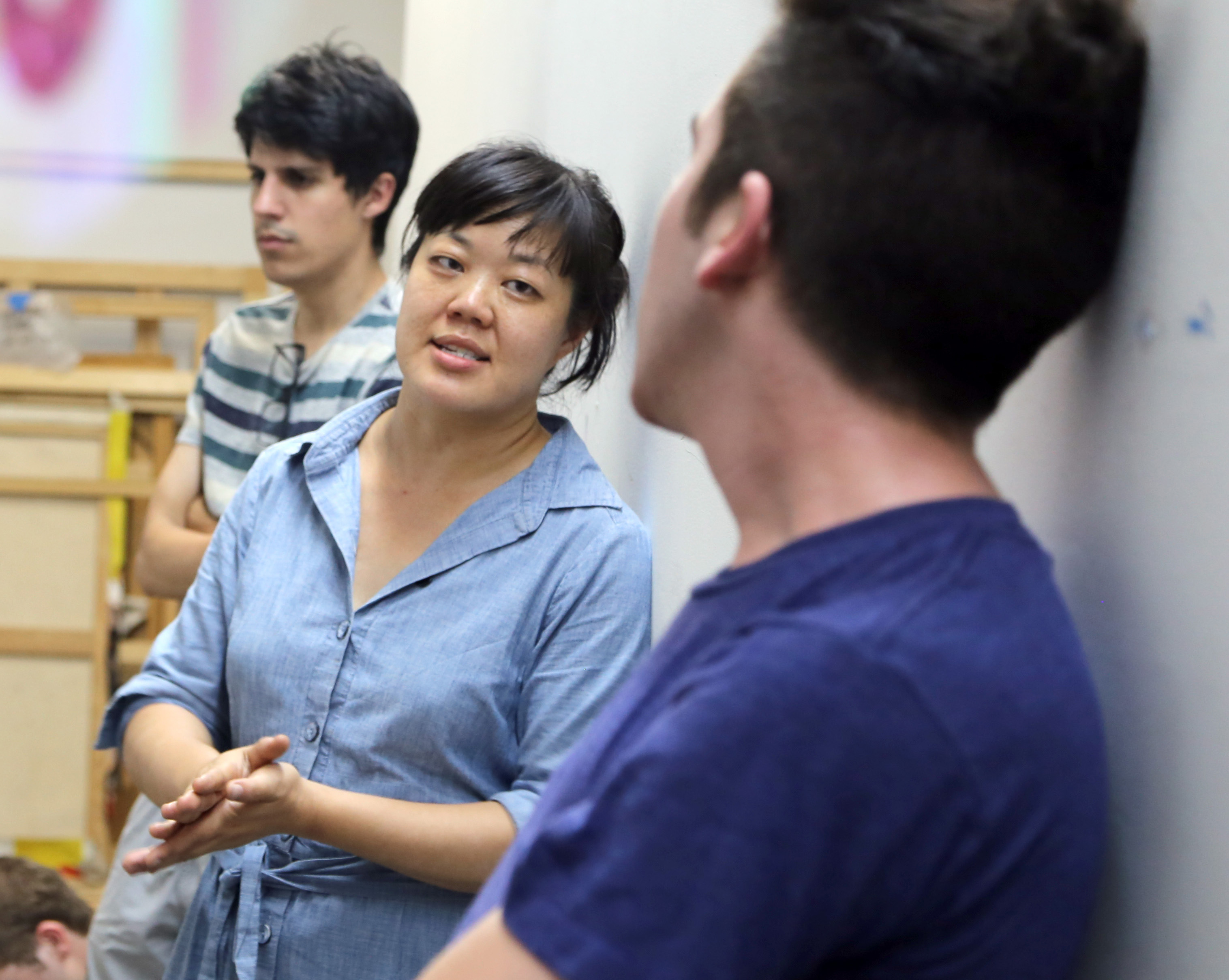
- Jen Liu talking with the New York Arts Practicum
- Born: 1976 (age 49–50)
- Education: Oberlin College, California Institute of the Arts
- Known for: Visual Art
- Awards: Creative Capital, Guggenheim Fellowship
- Website: jenliu.info

Jen Liu (born 1976) is an American visual artist. She works with video, performance, and painting and creates pieces about labor, economy and national identity. She was awarded a Guggenheim and a Creative Capital award.

== Education and career ==
She received a BA from Oberlin College, and an MFA from the California Institute of the Arts, and is a full-time faculty member at Bennington College. Liu is represented by Upstream Gallery.

== Works ==
Liu's work explore labor and gender. Her 2016 video, The Pink Detachment, is a reinterpretation of The Red Detachment of Women (1970), a Model Opera ballet from China’s Cultural Revolution. It premiered at the Berlinale Forum Expanded exhibition.

Her Pink Slime Caesar Shift series contains videos and animations that tell a story of female factory workers in South China altering the DNA of cow cells to transmit messages. Liu was awarded grants for this series from Creative Capital, and the Los Angeles County Museum of Art. It was featured in a solo exhibition at Upstream Gallery.

== Awards ==
Liu has been awarded a Guggenheim Fellowship (2017), NYFA Fellowship, Los Angeles County Museum of Art Art+Technology Award (2018), a Creative Capital Award (2019), and a Pollock-Krasner Foundation grant.

== Solo exhibitions (selection) ==
2022

- ELECTROPORE, Upstream Gallery, Amsterdam

2020

- Jen Liu + Aleksandra Domanovic, MAK Center for Art + Architecture in collaboration with LACMA, Los Angeles
- Jen Liu, ARIEL Platform for Feminist Art, Copenhagen
- GOLD LOOP, solo commissioned video, curated by Christina Millare, funded by the British Arts Council

2019

- PINK SLIME CAESAR SHIFT: GOLD EDITION, commissioned choreographic performance and installation, curated by Renan Laruan as part of the Singapore Biennale 2019

2018

- PINK SLIME CAESAR SHIFT, Upstream Gallery, Amsterdam

2017

- The Red Detachment: Bai Wei’s Natural History¬, solo commission by

OK.Video/ruangruppa, Bogor Zoology Museum, Bogor 2016

- Digital Billboard Platform: Jen Liu’s The Pink Detachment, LAXART, Los Angeles
- The Red Detachment of Women: Online, commissioned by Triple Canopy as part of the Standards issue
- Utopia is No Place, Utopia is Process - Usdan Gallery, Bennington College, Bennington, Vermont
- The Pink Detachment, 66th Berlinale, Berlin

2015

- The Red Detachment of Women: Performance for 6 Dancers, co- commissioned by Triple Canopy and The Whitney Museum, Whitney Museum, New York
