= Stefanie Jackson =

American painter

- Born: Detroit, Michigan, U.S.
- Occupations: Artist, painter, and teacher

Stefanie Jackson is an American painter whose art deals with themes of African American history and contemporary U.S. politics.

== Life and education ==
Jackson was born in Detroit and received her BFA from Parsons School of Design in 1979 and her MFA from Cornell University in 1988. She is currently an associate professor of drawing and painting at the Lamar Dodd School of Art at the University of Georgia.

== Paintings and influences ==
Jackson's work has been shown in a variety of galleries including the Stone Center for the Arts at University of North Carolina at Chapel Hill, The African American Museum (Dallas), and the Harriet Tubman Museum and the Afro-American Historical and Cultural Society Museum in Philadelphia.

Jackson has received a Special Projects Grant from the National Endowment of the Arts and several individual grants from the Georgia Council for the Arts. The Adolph and Esther Gottlieb Foundation gave Jackson an award in 2002.

Jackson's paintings draw on her own life experience as well as broader issues of social justice. Her influences span a broad range of styles including surrealism and African American literature. One major influence on Jackson's work is Southern blues music and culture. Much of Jackson's work deals with major events in U.S. and African American history. Her art has responded to the Atlanta Race Riots, the destruction of New Orleans by Hurricane Katrina, issues of public housing in Detroit and New Orleans, and the French colonial history of New Orleans.

More personally, Jackson draws inspiration from family tragedies, including losing her cousin to violence in Detroit, which is commemorated in the painting Little Girl Blue.
