= D.Y. Begay =

Navajo textile artist

- Born: 1953 (age 72–73)
- Known for: Weaving, textile arts
- Awards: 2018 USA Fellowship, United States Artists; SWAIA Discovery Fellowship
- Website: navajo-indian.com

D.Y. Begay (born 1953) is a Navajo textile artist born into the Tóʼtsohnii (Big Water) Clan and born from the Táchiiʼnii (Red Streak Earth) Clan.

== Biography ==
Begay is a fifth-generation weaver who grew up surrounded by women weavers. From them she learned sheep herding and shearing, and how to work with wool. She learned to spin and card wool, and traditional Navajo weaving techniques. Her mother taught her to identify plants to make dyes and to understand the dyeing process. At the age of 12, Begay sold her first rug. She later studied fiber arts at Arizona State University where she received her teacher's certificate. She lives in Tsélaní on the Navajo Nation and in Santa Fe, New Mexico.

== Career ==
Begay's artwork is influenced by her Navajo identity, the forms of nature and the colors of the landscape, flora and fauna. She experiments with combining a natural color palette with unconventional non-reservation color. In a video produced by the Virginia Museum of Fine Arts, she describes how she makes dyes from plant matter and soils, and thinks of the weaving process as analogous to "painting with yarn". The horizonal motifs in her work are reflective of the vistas, mesas and plateaus in Navajo country. Some of the ingredients in her dyes are chamisa, juniper berries, sage and a particular fungus that grows on juniper trees. She obtains her wool from her sister who is a sheep farmer.

Begay has traveled extensively to Bolivia, Guatemala, and Mexico to learn with other indigenous makers.

She describes her work in relation to her cultural heritage: "Everything in my weaving is natural. I use the same techniques passed from my ancestors to me to create designs that have artistic and traditional value."

== Exhibitions ==
Begay's work has been exhibited at the National Museum of the American Indian Smithsonian Institution in New York; the Peabody Essex Museum in Salem, Massachusetts; the National Museum of Scotland, Edinburgh, the Wheelwright Museum of the American Indian in Santa Fe, New Mexico; the C.N. Gorman Museum at the University of California, Davis; the Kennedy Museum of Art, Athens, Ohio; and the Museum of Fine Arts, Boston among others. Her artwork was included in the exhibition "Hearts of Our People: Native Women Artists." In 2020, her art was exhibited in the landmark exhibition Hearts of Our People: Native Women Artists at the Smithsonian American Art Museum.

A 2018 retrospective exhibition of her work entitled Tselani/Terrain: Tapestries of D.Y. Begay, was organized by the Museum of Northern Arizona.

Sublime Light: Tapestry Art of DY Begay, a featured exhibition at the National Museum of the American Indian in Washington, D.C., is on display September 20, 2024 – July 13, 2025. This exhibit is accompanied by a robust catalog that is also the first book devoted to her career and includes tapestries created between 1965 and 2022.

== Awards ==
In 2013, Begay received a Native American Art Studies Association Lifetime Achievement Award. Begay was named a 2018 USA Fellow by the United States Artists organization. In 2010 she received a SWAIA Discovery Fellowship, which supported her travel to Peru to work in collaboration with weavers there and participate in a Tinkuy de Tejedores gathering of weavers. She then traveled to Bolivia and Guatemala to facilitate workshops with local weavers. In 2019, she was named a Fellow by the Mellon Indigenous Arts Program, University of Virginia.

In 2026, she was named a Fellow by the American Craft Council (ACC).

== Collections ==
Begay's work is included in the collection of the Heard Museum in Phoenix, Arizona, the Minneapolis Institute of Art, the Virginia Museum of Fine Art and the Museum of Fine Arts, Boston.

== Bibliography ==
- Passalacqua, Veronica, ed. (2013). The Weavings of D.Y. Begay. UC Davis Repro Graphics, C.N. Gorman Museum, University of California, Davis. ISBN 9780988768208.
