= Beverly Semmes =

American artist based in New York City

- Born: 1958; Washington, DC, US
- Education: Boston Museum School, Tufts University, Yale University School of Art
- Known for: Sculpture, Textile, Fashion, Installation, Performance, Video, Photography
- Website: www.beverlysemmesstudio.com

Beverly Semmes (born 1958) is an American artist based in New York City who works in sculpture, textile, video, photography, performance, and large-scale installation.

== Education and career ==
Semmes studied at the Boston Museum School, Tufts University, and at the Yale University School of Art. During her graduate studies she experimented with heavy wire sculptures and with artificial objects rendered as natural ones, such as trees made of steel with painted-on leaves, which she ultimately placed in natural settings. Semmes is known for her large-scale sculpture and installations, which often explore the relationship between craft and fine art while simultaneously dealing with issues related to feminism, gender roles and womanhood. She explores this in many different ways, notably with her textile work, as textiles are traditionally associated with women and women's work. Her oversized dresses are dysfunctional in scale and composition, emphasizing the absence of the body. Semmes has stated that these pieces have a theatrical, performative quality and that she uses clothing as a means to explore its power and influence on the internal and external. Her ceramic works, often juxtaposed with her fabric installations, tend to be roughly shaped vessels in bright fluorescent shades, while her crystal works defy our expectations of the medium and serve as a metaphor for the female body.

== Feminist Responsibility Project (FRP) ==
Semmes began work on her series Feminist Responsibility Project (FRP) in the early 2000s. After receiving a cache of gentleman's magazines from a neighbor, the artist has spent the last two decades censoring pages from Penthouse and Hustler magazine with ink and paint. She partially covers the models' bodies as they engaged in titillating positions and acts, turning them into boldly-colored, abstract shapes and leaving their extremities, faces, and limbs uncovered. Writing on the FRP series, critic Martha Schwendener stated, “What she leaves blank, amid these colorful, blobby abstractions, are grasping hands, supplicating eyes, or sharp stiletto heels we associate with pornographic images (and performances).” The censoring of the images serves as an effort to protect the subject and the viewer from the imagery of porn, highlighting American society's conflicted relationship to pornography and sexual censorship.

In conversation with curator Ian Berry, Semmes stated that her role as a censor of the FRP images was complicated and made her feel:

"Shocked, amused, embarrassed. As I took out [body] parts that were more problematic for me, I could outlines the parts that had another appeal. I could bring it to a different place that made me more comfortable without the aspects that I found more disturbing."

In 2014, the Tang Museum presented the exhibition Opener 27 Beverly Semmes: FRP, which subsequently traveled to the Weatherspoon Art Museum and the Faulconer Gallery at Grinnell College.

== Witch Hunt (2021) ==
In October 10, 2021, the Hammer Museum in Los Angeles, California, organized an exhibition titled Witch Hunt, featuring sixteen women artists from thirteen countries. Semmes' work Helmet (2018) was featured alongside many other works that strive to encourage dialogue about contemporary feminist issues.

== Marigold (2022) ==
Semmes was one of eleven women artists commissioned by fashion designer Sarah Burton, the creative director of fashion brand Alexander McQueen, to create an artwork that would represent both their artistic style and reference motifs from the brand's latest fashion line. Semmes contribution was an installation of garment-based sculptures titled Marigold. Semmes selected a McQueen dress, handbag, and pair of shoes and incorporated these readymade garments into artworks that divert the way fashion and fashion designers have objectified women's bodies.

== Exhibitions And Collections ==
Semmes' has exhibited her work internationally at museums and galleries including the Museum of Modern Art, New York, Locks Gallery, Philadelphia, Camden Arts Centre, London, Institute of Contemporary Art, Philadelphia, Fabric Workshop and Museum, Philadelphia, and the Wexner Center for the Arts, Columbus.

Her work is included in the collections of the Nasher Sculpture Center, Dallas, Texas, Museum of Contemporary Art, Los Angeles, California, Museum of Contemporary Art, North Miami, Florida, Hirshhorn Museum and Sculpture Garden, Washington, D.C (part of the Smithsonian Institution), Denver Art Museum, Denver, Colorado, and the Whitney Museum of American Art, New York City, New York. Semmes is represented by Susan Inglett Gallery in New York City.
