= Jeanne Dunning =

American photographer

Jeanne Dunning (born 1960) is an American photographer whose work is centered around corporeality and human physicality in abstract forms.

== Education and early career ==
Dunning earned her Bachelor of Arts from Oberlin College and her Masters of Fine Arts from The School of the Art Institute of Chicago. From there, she opened her first exhibit at the Feature Gallery in Chicago in 1987. In the early 1990s, Dunning created a series of photographs for an exhibit titled "Directions" which was meant to blur the lines of fact and fiction. The exhibit was displayed at the Hirshhorn Museum in Washington.

== Collections ==
Dunning's work is included in the permanent collections of the Art Institute of Chicago, the Whitney Museum of American Art, the Museum of Contemporary Art, Chicago, the Museum of Contemporary Photography and the Museum of Modern Art, New York.
