= Joan Nelson =

American artist

Joan Nelson (born 1958, El Segundo, California) is a visual artist who lives and works in upstate New York. For over three decades, Nelson has been making "epic and theatrical landscape paintings," borrowing from art history and re-presenting iconic vistas from the Fine Art lexicon including those of the Hudson River and Mount Hood.

== Life ==
Nelson was born in 1958 in California and she spent her youth in St. Louis, Missouri, and "emerged from the East Village in the mid-‘80s at the forefront of a landscape revival that blurred the line between romance and irony.” Now, as then, Nelson paints small paintings on thick pieces of wood using a variety of materials such as oil paint and glitter, often combined with wax. She is well known for incorporating multiple pictorial landscape traditions in her vistas, combining fragments of paintings by other artists including those of artists: Hergé (Georges Remi), who illustrated The Adventures of Tintin, Albrecht Altdorfer, Albert Bierstadt, Edward Hicks, Caspar David Friedrich, and George Caleb Bingham. This "referential vocabulary" demonstrates that Nelson's "landscape painting is not about the imitation of nature, or verisimilitude, but about art.” Occupying a unique place in the long history of landscape painting, Nelson "speaks to the experience of nature and the complexity of its representation across time and place... one that is distinctly female and revisionist." Her work has been described as "apocalyptic, with critics uncertain whether she is showing us an end or a potential beginning."

Nelson has showed her work regularly at—among other places—the Robert Miller Gallery in New York City, and she is currently represented by Adams and Ollman Gallery, Portland, Oregon. Her work is included in the collections of the Museum of Modern Art and the Solomon R. Guggenheim Museum in New York; the Los Angeles County Museum of Art; the Minneapolis Museum of Art; the Hirshhorn Museum and Sculpture Garden in Washington D.C.; and the Museum of Fine Arts, Boston. Her work has been reviewed by Art in America, Artforum, ArtReview, New Art Examiner, The New Yorker, Visual Arts Journal, ARTnews, The New York Times, and The Los Angeles Times. Her work is also included in Phaidon Press' Contemporary Women Artists (1988) and Abrams' On Modern American Art (1999).
