= Nancy Shaver =

Contemporary visual artist

- Born: 1946 (age 79–80); Appleton, New York
- Education: BFA, Pratt Institute
- Known for: Visual art
- Awards: 2013 The Louis Comfort Tiffany Foundation; 2010 Guggenheim Fellowship

Nancy Shaver (born 1946) is an American visual artist based in Jefferson, New York.

== Early life and education ==
Shaver was born in 1946 in Appleton, New York. She earned a BFA at Pratt Institute in 1969.

In 1994, Shaver opened the antique shop "Henry" in Hudson, New York.

== Career ==
She has taught in Bard College’s MFA program for more than 20 years.

The "Robert Gober: The Heart is Not a Metaphor" exhibit at the Museum of Modern Art in 2015 includes some of her early photographs. Her work also appeared in MoMA-PS1’s "Greater New York" in 2015, La Biennale di Venezia "Viva Arte Viva" in 2017, and at the National Gallery, Washington, DC, in "Outliers and the American Vanguard Art" in 2018.

== Selected exhibitions ==
- 2025, Bus Stop, Derek Eller Gallery, New York, NY
- 2020, fastness, slowness and Monstrous Beauty, Derek Eller Gallery, New York, NY
- 2018, A part of a part of part, Derek Eller Gallery, New York, NY
- 2016, Dress the Form, Derek Eller Gallery, New York, NY
- 2015, Nancy Shaver: Reconciliation, The Aldrich Contemporary Art Museum, Ridgefield, CT
- 2013, In Place, John David Gallery, Hudson, NY
- 2011, Three Sisters, Four Beauties, and a Workhorse, Feature Inc., New York, NY
- 2003, 2004, 2007: Feature Inc., New York, NY
- 2002: Painted Sculpture, Feature Inc., New York, NY
- 1987, 1989, 1991, 1994, 1997, 1999: Curt Marcus Gallery, New York, NY
- 1989: Michael Kohn Gallery, Los Angeles, CA
- 1974: Hundred Acres Gallery, New York
- 1972: Pratt Manhattan Center, New York, NY

== Critical reception ==
The New York Times wrote, "Nancy Shaver’s exhibitions often overload the senses. They are extravaganzas of stuff, colorful and tactile, mostly society’s castoffs recycled into forms that expose false binaries, like high versus low, form versus function, masculine versus feminine and art versus craft." Alex Abramovich of The New Yorker wrote that she "collects textiles and objects that are as likely to end up in her antique shop in Hudson, New York, as they are in galleries."

According to Sherman Sam of ArtForum, "A typical Shaver form consists of a grid of boxy canvases, usually joined together two deep into a larger block, and covered with different patterned fabrics upon which are also collaged clothes and pieces of drawings." Art in America's Dan Nadel wrote, "Her sprawling installation for the Biennale—a motley amalgamation of her boxy sculptures and contributions from nineteen other artists—is partly autobiographical. The work reflects a long process of developing a handmade aesthetic with a communal ethos..." Susan Hodara of The New York Times wrote of the exhibit, Reconciliation, "For Ms. Shaver, inspiration comes from found objects, particularly fabrics culled from rural thrift shops...The presence of Evans’s photographs and Delaunay’s designs in Reconciliation underscores the exhibition’s spectrum of aesthetic, economic and cultural references."

== Awards and honors ==
Shaver has received multiple awards.

- 2014 National Women's Political Caucus - Art as Media Award
- 2013 Louis Comfort Tiffany Foundation
- 2010 Guggenheim Foundation Fellowship
- 2008 Anonymous Was a Woman Foundation
- 1993 Pollack-Krasner Foundation
- 1974 Yaddo Fellowship
- 1973 MacDowell Fellowship
- 1972 MacDowell Fellowship
