= Apexart =

Art space in Manhattan, New York

apexart
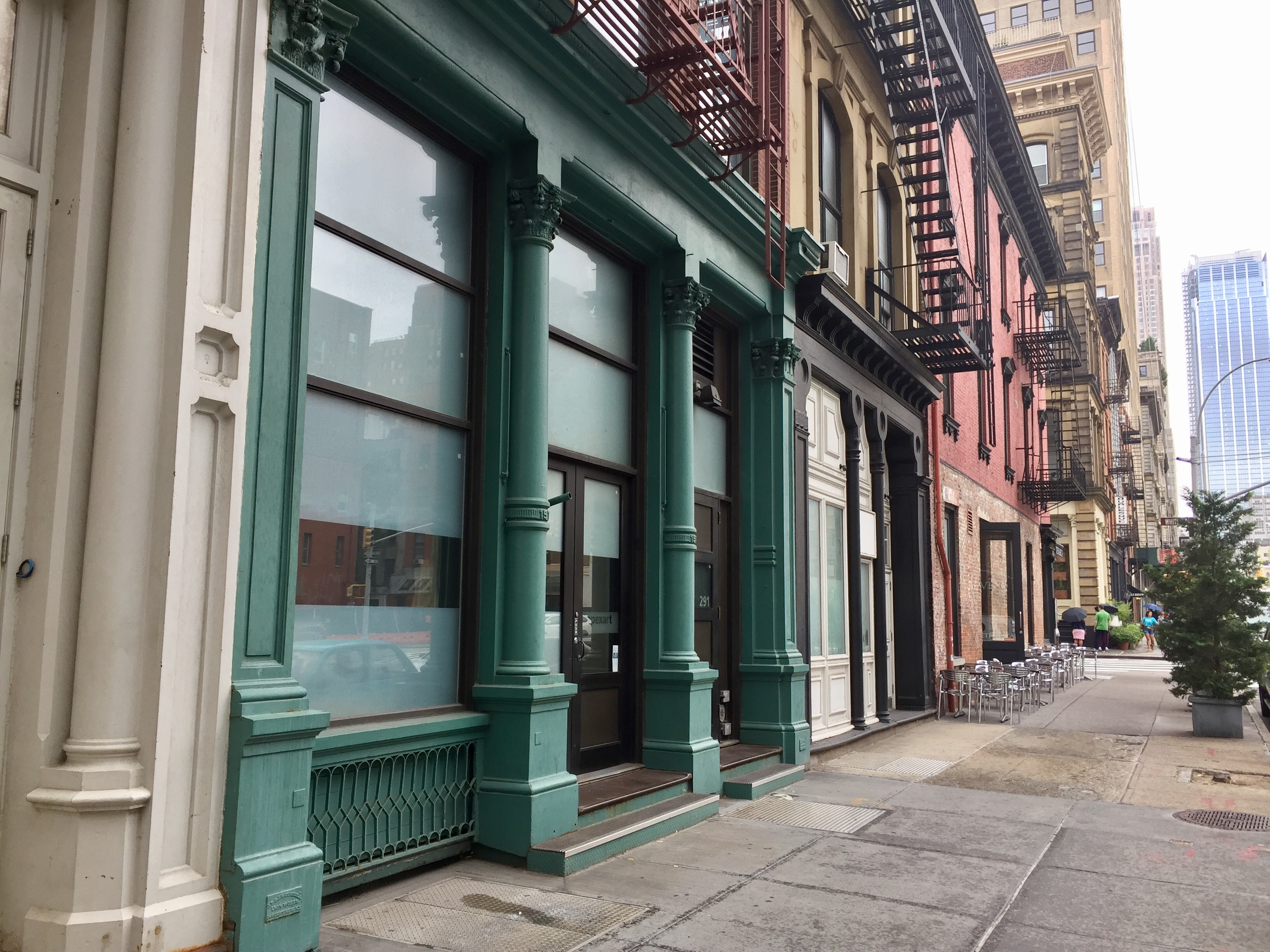
- Apexart at 291 Church St
- Established: 1994
- Location: 291 Church Street, New York, NY 10013
- Coordinates: 40°43′08″N 74°00′16″W
- Type: Art
- Director: Steven Rand
- Website: apexart

Apexart (stylized as apexart) is a non-profit art space located in Lower Manhattan, New York. Situated within the Tribeca East Historic District, the organization, founded by Steven Rand in 1994, combines spaces for creative endeavor and curation to encourage experimentation and innovation. apexart offers several open call programs intended to even the playing field between applicants, diversify experience and perspective, and push back against the commercialization of art.

== Programming ==
Apexart's seasons are built around its many annual programs: the New York City Open Call, the International Open Call, Exhibition Programs, and the Global Fellowship. Nine exhibitions are held at apexart's Tribeca space or at temporary venues internationally and more than 50 public lectures and performances are given by local and visiting artists. International exhibition locations have included Tehran, São Paulo, Lagos, Johannesburg, Bamako, Tbilisi, Tarrafal, Istanbul, Hong Kong, and Lima.

The NYC Open Call and the International Open Call, open to New Yorkers and to the rest of the world, respectively, each select four winners using a "crowd-sourced voting process," wherein nearly 800 jurors around the world view and vote on anonymously submitted proposals. The geographical spread and large number of jurors is specifically structured to counteract cultural bias, with proposals going to at least one juror familiar with the relevant cultural context. Winners receive a $10,000 exhibition budget, $2,000 of which is a stipend, and showcase their work at apexart's Tribeca space. In the 2022-23 exhibition season, there were 336 submissions from more than 70 countries. Previous NYC Open Call winners include Corina Apostol and Tashina Thomas (2021), Clark Clark (2021), and Mary Coyne (2015), whose exhibition featured work by James Bridle, Alessandro Ludovico, and Julia Scher. Previous International Open Call winners include Favour Ritaro (2023), Agustina Woodgate and Stephanie Elyse Sherman (2017), Claude Gomis and Saskia Köbschall (2016), and The League of Imaginary Scientists (2009).

There are three parts of the Exhibition Program: the Invited Curator series, Unsolicited Proposal Program, and the Franchise Program. The Invited Curator series holds two exhibitions annually organized by invited individuals. Past curators have included Betty Yu (2020), David Eggers (2015), David Bianculli (2014), Leah Buechley, Dan Kois (2013), Rob Walker (2012), Simon Critchley (2010), and Boris Groys (2008). Arthur Danto's exhibition in 2005 featured work by Audrey Flack, Leslie King-Hammond, Mary Miss, Ursula von Rydingsvard, Cindy Sherman, and Robert Zakanitch. Brian Sholis' exhibition in 2012 featured work by Justine Kurland, James Welling, Mark Ruwedel, Victoria Sambunaris, and Jeff Brouws.

The Unsolicited Proposal Program is "idea-driven" and requires applicants to submit 500 words describing their idea for an exhibition. Like all other apexart programs, the proposals are anonymous and chosen by a jury of more than 100 people. All shows are held at apexart's Tribeca space. Past winners include Miguel Díaz-Barriga and Margaret Dorsey, who organized an exhibition showcasing reimaginings of the Mexico–United States border in 2016, and Robin Paris and Tom Williams, whose exhibition commissioned works by 12 death row inmates in Tennessee for their own memorials. Other past winners include Alastair Noble (2014), Avi Lubin (2014), Ola El-Khalidi (2013), Kari Cwynar (2013), Natalie Musteata (2012), Gary Fogelson and Michael Hutcherson (2011), Courtenay Finn (2010) and Sandra Skurvida (2009). In 2013, Martin Waldmeier's Death of a Cameraman exhibition featured Adam Broomberg and Oliver Chanarin, Harun Farocki, and Rabih Mroué.

Similarly, the Franchise Program accepts 500-word proposals for exhibitions though, unlike the Unsolicited Proposals Program, the exhibitions take place anywhere outside of New York City. Three winners are chosen annually. Past winners include Tiffany Boyle and Jessica Carden (Barbados, 2016), Bill Doherty and Tim McGlynn (Memphis, Tennessee, 2013) Corina Oprea, Isabel Löfgren, Judith Souriau, Milena Placentile, and Valerio Del Baglivo (Sweden, 2011) and Logan Bay (Thailand, 2010).

apexart Fellows travel to a different country for one month, where they are given an itinerary of activities to inspire and challenge them. Steven Rand, apexart's founder, stresses the importance of introspection during the trip and encourages Fellows to revisit what they are doing with their art and why. Each year, eight artists from outside the United States are brought to New York City and five New York-based artists are sent abroad to destinations like Phnom Penh, Seoul, Addis Ababa, Bangkok, and São Paulo. While abroad, American Fellows cannot work on or research for new pieces or network, while international Fellows are encouraged to forge professional ties.

== Publications ==
- 2006: On Cultural Influence: Collected Papers from Apexart International Conferences (ISBN 9781933347110)
- 2007: Cautionary tales: Critical Curating (ISBN 1933347104)
- 2010: Playing by the Rules: Alternative Thinking/Alternative Spaces (ISBN 9781933347431)
- 2013: Life Between Borders: The Nomadic Life of Curators and Artists (ISBN 978-1-933347-65-3)
- 2017: The Apexart Fellowship: an Experiment in Vertical Cultural Integration (ISBN 978-1-933347-94-3)
