= Retort (collective) =

Activist collective in California, US

Retort is a community of about forty writers, teachers, artists, and activists, all self-styled opponents of capital and empire, which has been based for the past two decades in the San Francisco Bay Area.

Retort is a gathering of antinomians. It is not a typical collective; there is no explicit program. Retort is a motley crew – writers, artists, teachers, artisans, scientists, poets – joined in a web of sustaining friendships, who share an antagonism to the present order of things. Retort has been meeting on a regular basis for the last two decades, for the most part to eat and drink together, but also to discuss politics, history, aesthetics, and the terms and tactics of root-and-branch opposition to capital, empire and the various versions of barbarism currently on offer. There is a deep appreciation of old cafes and city taverns, competing with a tendency to favor the open air – rambles, the back country, tidepool picnics, wild swimming. The gathering has produced broadsides and pamphlets for particular occasions, and from time to time they also organize more public events – readings, conviviums, evenings of film, and so forth. There are collaborations of many kinds within the milieu.

The name "Retort" acknowledges that the project is engaged in a wider conversation whose terms and assumptions they reject, and that Retorters stand on ground, rhetorical and otherwise, not of our own choosing. Some feel forced to spend much of the time – far too much – in rebuttals, demurrers, rejoinders. In a word, retorting. The name gestures to an obscure non-sectarian 1940s journal of that title, which at first, (new) Retort thought seriously about reviving. It was edited and published out of a cabin in Bearsville, New York, a hamlet near Woodstock, New York.

Retort's printing press had belonged to the eloquent Wobbly agitator Carlo Tresca, before he was assassinated on the streets of Manhattan, perhaps by agents of Benito Mussolini. The journal Retort was anti-statist and anti-militarist. It published essays on art, politics, culture and poetry. It first published the Kenneth Rexroth poem that begins:

Now in Waldheim where the rain
Has fallen careless and unthinking
For all an evil century's youth,
Where now the banks of dark roses lie...

Retort Press also published Prison Etiquette: The Convict's Compendium of Useful Information compiled by war resisters, specifically those imprisoned for refusing to collaborate either with the state or with the Anabaptist "peace churches" who had agreed with the U.S. government to self-manage the rural work camps for conscientious objectors. Finally, a retort is like the alchemist's vessel that ferments, distils, transforms. It's fragile, it needs fire, there may be problems with the underlying theory, but there's occasional magic.

Retort's broadsheet Neither Their War Nor Their Peace was produced for distribution at demonstrations against the impending US invasion of Iraq in the spring of 2003. It was later expanded into the book Afflicted Powers: Capital and Spectacle in a New Age of War, written by Iain Boal, T.J. Clark, Joseph Matthews and Michael Watts and published by Verso Books.

The broadsheet "All Quiet on the Eastern Front" was part of Retort's installation at the second Seville Biennial.

Associated members include:

- English geographer Michael Watts
- Irish social historian Iain Boal
- British art historian T.J. Clark
- radical attorney Joseph Matthews
- labor historian Cal Winslow
- editor Eddie Yuen
- economic geographer Richard Walker
- art historian Anne Wagner
- Victor Serge
- translator James Brook
- microbial ecologist Ignacio Chapela
- poet and writer Summer Brenner
- broadcaster and editor Sasha Lilley
- Balkan anarchist Andrej Grubačić
- Italian literary scholar Franco Moretti.
