= John O'Brian =

Canadian art historian

- John O'Brian
- Born: John O'Brian; April 2, 1944 (age 82); Bath, England
- Education: University of Toronto; York University; Harvard University
- Occupations: art historian, writer, curator
- Awards: Thakore Award in Human Rights and Peace Studies, Simon Fraser University; Honorary doctorate, Trinity College, University of Toronto; Fellow, Royal Society of Canada

John O'Brian is a Canadian art historian, writer, and curator. He is best known for his books on modern art, including Clement Greenberg: The Collected Essays and Criticism, one of The New York Times "Notable Books of the Year" in 1986, and for his exhibitions on nuclear photography, such as Camera Atomica, organized for the Art Gallery of Ontario in 2015—the first comprehensive exhibition on postwar nuclear photography. From 1987 to 2017, he taught at the University of British Columbia, Vancouver, where he held the Brenda & David McLean Chair in Canadian Studies and was an associate of the Peter Wall Institute for Advanced Studies. O'Brian has been a critic of reactionary cultural policies since the start of the Culture Wars in the 1980s. Martha Langford writes that O’Brian has had “nine lives in the visual arts, from Greenberg’s and Canadian Modernism’s explicator to the Western photographic turn via wilderness and the nuclear winter of global discontent. O’Brian writes very much from the middle of things.”

O'Brian is a recipient of the Thakore Award in Human Rights and Peace Studies from Simon Fraser University and an honorary doctorate from Trinity College, University of Toronto. He is a fellow of the Royal Society of Canada.

== Early life and education ==
O'Brian was born in 1944 to Canadian parents in Bath, England. His father was a career officer in the Royal Air Force. He was educated at New Park School in St. Andrews, Fife, and Trinity College School in Port Hope, Ontario, before entering Trinity College at the University of Toronto, where he received an Honours BA in political science and economics in 1966. At university, he played varsity rugby.

He worked at the Toronto firm of Harris & Partners until 1974, before enrolling at York University to study art and literature. There, he began to publish art criticism, poetry, and art history. He received his PhD in art history from Harvard University under the supervision of T.J. Clark. While at Harvard, he was a research associate at the Fogg Art Museum and a proponent of social art history, an approach that investigates social as well as aesthetic issues. "I'm interested in how art gets produced and looked at under the social arrangements of capitalism," he stated in an interview. His work has sometimes been targeted by conservative critics for mixing art and politics. O'Brian was also a member of the Pumping Station collective, a group of radical thinkers that met at the house of Gillian and Iain Boal in Cambridge, Massachusetts, during the first half of the 1980s.

== Teaching and lectures ==
O'Brian has taught at York University, Toronto; Harvard University, Cambridge; The University of British Columbia, Vancouver; and Ritsumeikan University, Kyoto. At the University of British Columbia, he was appointed assistant professor in 1987, associate professor in 1991, and full professor in 1998. He chaired the University Art Committee from 1993 to 2014 and the Program in Canadian Studies from 2002 to 2005. He held the Brenda & David McLean Chair in Canadian Studies from 2008 to 2011 and was an associate of the Peter Wall Institute for Advanced Studies. He taught undergraduate and graduate courses, in addition to supervising more than one hundred MA theses and PhD dissertations over the course of his career.

O'Brian's students include:

- Alexander Alberro (professor, Columbia University)
- Patrik Andersson (associate professor, Emily Carr University, and curator, Trapp Projects)
- Grant Arnold (curator emeritus, Vancouver Art Gallery)
- Asato Ikeda (associate professor, Fordham University)
- Jeff Khonsary (founder and artistic director, Fillip)
- Gabrielle Moser (director, Jarislowsky Institute for Studies in Canadian Art, Concordia University)
- Kim Nguyễn (director of programs, Ruth Foundation for the Arts)
- Jeff O'Brien (curator, Material / Image Research Lab, University of California, Santa Barbara)
- Kimberly Phillips (director, Gibson Art Gallery, Simon Fraser University)
- Daniel Sobrino Ralston (associate curator, National Gallery, London)
- Monika Szewczyk (Audain Chief Curator, The Polygon Gallery)

At UBC, he regularly organized field trips for students to galleries, archives, and international conferences. Following the election of Donald Trump as president of the United States in 2016, he cancelled a field trip to New York because, he said, "worms are crawling out of the ground all over America [and I will] not crawl with them." Students circulated a petition denouncing the cancellation.

He has lectured across North America as well as in Europe, Australia, China, India, Israel, Japan, Mexico, Palestine, and South Africa. He was the Shastri Indo-Canadian Institute Visiting Lecturer in India in 1996–1997 and visiting research professor at Ritsumeikan University in Japan in 2007.

== Publications ==
O’Brian is the author or editor of twenty books and numerous articles and book chapters, some of which have been translated into French, German, Spanish, Italian, Portuguese, and Japanese. Approximately half his publications focus on Canadian art and culture.

David Milne and the Modern Tradition of Painting (1983) examines the intellectual and stylistic sources of Milne’s work, arguing that his art and theories were closely connected to international modernism rather than developing in isolation. Drawing on Milne’s letters, essays, and other writings, O’Brian situates the artist’s paintings within the context of early-twentieth-century modernist criticism and artistic practice. Reviewing the book in 1984, Lora Senechal Carney praised O’Brian’s analysis of Milne’s writings, stating that “it is unlikely that this aspect of the book will ever be surpassed.”

The four volumes of Clement Greenberg: The Collected Essays and Criticism (vol. 1–2, 1986; vol. 3–4, 1993) have generated international interest and debate. In an editorial written for The New Criterion, Hilton Kramer expressed admiration for Greenberg’s criticism but distaste for O’Brian’s politicization of it.

Ruthless Hedonism: The American Reception of Matisse (1999) investigates how the artist and his work were received in America until his death in 1954. To promote his work, Henri Matisse tried to show the media that whatever his reputation as an avant-gardist the conduct of his life was solidly bourgeois. He collaborated closely with museums exhibiting his work, cultivated private collectors, and played off dealers against each other. The book “casts a great deal of light on the way in which a picture becomes valuable… Patronage is as much a romance as a business transaction.”

The Bomb in the Wilderness (2020) contends that photography is one of the primary ways, if not the primary way, nuclear activities are interpreted and remembered. The book asks: Do photographs alert viewers to nuclear threat, numb them to its dangers, or do both at the same time? O’Brian argues that the impact and global reach of Canada’s nuclear programs have been felt ever since the bombing of Hiroshima and Nagasaki in 1945. The book has been referred to as a “foundational text”. Douglas Coupland writes, “It finds beauty in grotesque places [and] validates the reader’s Cold War paranoia.”

=== Selected books and exhibition catalogues ===
- David Milne and the Modern Tradition of Painting. Toronto: Coach House Press, 1983.
- Degas to Matisse: The Maurice Wertheim Collection. New York and Cambridge, MA: Harry N. Abrams and Harvard Art Museums, 1988.
- Clement Greenberg: The Collected Essays and Criticism. 4 vols. Chicago: University of Chicago Press, 1986 and 1993.
- The Flat Side of the Landscape: The Emma Lake Artists' Workshops. Saskatoon: Mendel Art Gallery, 1989.
- Voices of Fire: Art, Rage, Power, and the State. Co-edited with Bruce Barber and Serge Guilbaut. Toronto: University of Toronto Press, 1996.
- Ruthless Hedonism: The American Reception of Matisse. Chicago: University of Chicago Press, 1999.
- All Amazed: For Roy Kiyooka. Co-edited with Naomi Sawada and Scott Watson. Vancouver: Arsenal Pulp Press, 2002.
- Greenberg Variations. Portland, OR: The Back Room, 2007.
- Beyond Wilderness: The Group of Seven, Canadian Identity and Contemporary Art. Co-edited with Peter White. Montreal: McGill-Queen's University Press, 2007.
- Atomic Postcards: Radioactive Messages from the Cold War. Co-written with Jeremy Borsos. Bristol, UK: Intellect Books, 2011.
- Strangelove's Weegee. Vancouver: Presentation House Gallery, 2013.
- Camera Atomica. Editor. London and Toronto: Black Dog Publishing and the Art Gallery of Ontario, 2015.
- Breathless Days, 1959–1960. Co-edited with Serge Guilbaut. Durham, NC: Duke University Press, 2017.
- The Bomb in the Wilderness: Photography and the Nuclear Era in Canada. Vancouver: UBC Press, 2020.
- Through Post-Atomic Eyes. Co-edited with Claudette Lauzon. Montreal: McGill-Queen's University Press, 2020.
- John Scott: Firestorm. Kleinburg, ON: McMichael Gallery Canadian Art Collection, 2024.

=== Selected articles ===
- "Shining on the Modernist Parade: The American Sacralization of Matisse at the Philadelphia Museum of Art in 1948." In Coloquio Internacional de Historia del Arte 20 (Mexico City, 1997): 771–805.
- "Anthem Lip-Sync." The Journal of Canadian Art History 21, no. 1/2 (2000): 140–151.
- "Bernard Smith's Early Marxist Art History." Thesis Eleven (Australia) no. 82 (August 2005): 29–37.
- "Another Report on the Age of Extinction." Canadian Review of American Studies 38, no.1 (2008): 191–198.
- "The Nuclear Family of Man." Japan Focus: Asia Pacific Journal, July 2008. http://japanfocus.org/ (re-published on The History News Network)
- "Amerika Dropt a Bomb on Nevada." Open Letter: A Canadian Journal of Writing and Theory 14, no. 4 (Fall 2010): 63–77.
- "Postcard to Moscow." In Postcards: Ephemeral Histories of Modernity, edited by Jordana Mendelson and David Proschaska, 182–193, 222–224. Philadelphia: Pennsylvania State University Press, 2010.
- "Ishiuchi Miyako Interviewed by John O'Brian." In Hiroshima by Ishiuchi Miyako. Vancouver: UBC Museum of Anthropology, 2011.
- "On Photographing a Dirty Bomb." In The Cultural Work of Photography in Canada, edited by Carol Payne and Andrea Kunnard, 182–194. Montreal: McGill-Queen's University Press, 2011.
- "The Bomb, the Group of Seven, and Douglas Coupland's G7 Series." In Douglas Coupland: Everywhere Is Anywhere Is Anything Is Everything, 69–71. Vancouver and London: Vancouver Art Gallery and Black Dog Publishing, 2014.
- "Morrice and Matisse: Bedfellows Under the Sign of Modernism." In Morrice and Lyman in the Company of Matisse, 113–135. Quebec: Musée National des Beaux-Arts du Québec, 2014.
- "Sur le plateau de Docteur Folamour." In Errances Photographiques: Mobilité, Intermédialité, edited by Suzanne Paquet, 185–200. Montreal: Presses de L'Université de Montréal, 2014.
- "Landscape as Fordscape." In Picturing the Americas: Landscape Painting from Tierra del Fuego to the Arctic, 188–193. Toronto and São Paulo: Art Gallery of Ontario and Pinacoteca do Estado de São Paulo / Yale University Press, 2015. (Project)
- "Clement Greenberg," co-authored with Jessica Law and Jeff O'Brien. Oxford Bibliographies in Art History, 2016, www.oxfordbibliographies.com.
- "Motive for Metaphor.” In David Milne: Modern Painting, 161–163. London: Dulwich Picture Gallery, 2018.
- "Dead West: Mark Ruwedel and Sacrifice Zones." In Deutsche Borse Photography Prize, 118–119. London: The Photographers Gallery, 2019.
- “Frankenstein’s Stitches.” In Le récit / The Narrative, edited by Martha Langford, 33–45. Montreal: Artexte Editions and the Jarislowsky Institute, 2024.

== Museum and gallery work ==
O'Brian has been professionally involved with museums and galleries as a curator, exhibitor, researcher, advisor, and board member. From 1989 to 1991, he served on the board of the Vancouver Art Gallery. He was a special advisor to the board of the National Gallery of Canada from 1991 to 1998, and in 2020 was appointed an external advisor to the gallery. Other museums and galleries with which he has been actively engaged include the Harvard University Art Museums, The Polygon Gallery, and the Morris and Helen Belkin Art Gallery.

Guest curated by O'Brian for the Art Gallery of Ontario in 2015, Camera Atomica was "the first substantial exhibition of nuclear photography to encompass the entire postwar period from the bombings of Hiroshima in 1945 to the triple meltdown at Fukushima Daiichi in 2011." The exhibition included over two hundred works ranging from photographs taken by the United States government of atomic bomb tests to images of anti-nuclear protests on the streets of Toronto, images by artists, and photos of the utilization of nuclear technology in medicine. In addition to addressing key issues in the nuclear era, Camera Atomica aimed to make visible the interconnections between nuclear technology and the photographic medium. One critic concluded that going to the show was "a civic duty". Peter Galison wrote that "this remarkable show and catalogue promise to make clear that the age of the nucleus is also and always an age of the image."

=== Selected exhibitions organized ===
- Strangelove’s Weegee, Presentation House Art Gallery, North Vancouver, June–July 2013. Curator.
- After the Flash, WORK Gallery, London (UK), October–December 2014. Co-curator.
- Camera Atomica, Art Gallery of Ontario, Toronto, July–November 2015. Curator.
- The Nuclear Machine, Danish Institute for International Studies, Copenhagen, May–June 2016. Co-curator.
- Bombhead, Vancouver Art Gallery, Vancouver, March–June 2018. Curator.
- John Scott: Firestorm, McMichael Gallery, Kleinburg, Ontario, December 2024–May 2025. Curator.

== Artistic practice ==
O'Brian maintains an occasional art practice, exhibiting work at public and private galleries: the limited-edition artist's book Delirium (2024), comprising "terrifyingly-sequenced" cast-off press photographs, was shown at Trapp Projects, Vancouver; the short film Octozilla (2018), produced with Gregory Coyes, at the Vancouver Art Gallery; Ci elegans (2017), a drawing by Marina Roy with overwriting by O'Brian, at SFU Galleries, Vancouver; Sixteen Nuclear Power Stations (2013) at the Art Gallery of Ontario, Toronto; Multiplication (1998) at Catriona Jeffries Gallery, Vancouver; and More Los Angeles Apartments (1998) at Gagosian Gallery in New York and Los Angeles. Photographer Jeff Brouws has described how "More Los Angeles Apartments unfolds as a peripatetic meditation on Edward Ruscha's photobooks, personally placing O'Brian in geographical and conceptual proximity to Ruscha's earlier work."

== Research and archives ==
Until the early 2000s, O'Brian's research focused on modern art history and criticism, primarily in North America. Since then, it has concentrated on nuclear photography in North America and Japan. The John O’Brian fonds (1973–2024) at the Library and Archives, National Gallery of Canada includes his research, publications, curatorial records, correspondence—most notably with Clement Greenberg from 1981 to 1993—photographs, audiovisual materials, artworks, and objects. The fonds also contains a significant atomic collection related to nuclear history and culture (including propaganda pamphlets, protest leaflets, and postcards), as well as a research library. Together, these materials document O’Brian’s work on Canadian and modernist art, nuclear photography (military, press, vernacular), and visual culture. Selected ephemera and records from the atomic collection were presented in a small exhibition at the gallery in 2025.

== Awards and recognition ==
- Janet Braide Award for outstanding scholarship in Canadian art history, 1990
- Senior Research Fellowship, Canadian Centre for the Visual Arts, Ottawa, 1992–1993
- Shastri Indo-Canadian Institute Visiting Lectureship, India, 1996–1997
- Killam Research Prize, University of British Columbia, 2000
- Visiting Research Professor, Ritsumeikan University, Kyoto, 2007
- Brenda & David McLean Chair in Canadian Studies, University of British Columbia, 2008–2011
- Fellow of the Royal Society of Canada, 2009
- Honorary doctorate from Trinity College, the University of Toronto, 2011
- Thakore Award in Human Rights and Peace Studies, Simon Fraser University, 2011
- Sports Hall of Fame, University of Toronto, 2016
- Lifetime Achievement Award, Universities Art Association of Canada, 2020
- Royal Canadian Academy of Arts Medal, 2024

== Personal life ==
In 1969 O'Brian, married Helen Worts, with whom he has three children: Melanie O'Brian, Amy O'Brian Wang, and Meghan O'Brian Braunstein. He also has four grandchildren. His only sibling, Peter O'Brian, is a filmmaker and producer.

Since 1998, O’Brian and his wife have maintained a heritage orchard on their farm on Mayne Island, British Columbia, where he prunes, grafts, harvests, and sells organic fruit for the local community. He resides on Mayne Island and in Vancouver.
