= Iain Boal =

Irish social historian

Iain Boal is an Irish social historian of technics and the commons, based in Berkeley, California and London.

== Biography ==
He was one of the co-founders of the Retort collective, an association of radical writers, artists, and activists in the Bay Area from the 1990s to the present. He co-edited Resisting the Virtual Life: The Culture and Politics of Information (1995). He co-authored Afflicted Powers: Capital and Spectacle in a New Age of War (2001), along with T.J. Clark, Joseph Matthews and Michael Watts. In 2012, he published The Green Machine - a world history of the bicycle (Notting Hill Editions, out of print). He co-edited West of Eden: Communes and Utopia in Northern California (2012) with Janferie Stone, Michael Watts, and Cal Winslow. Since 2005, he has also been working on a book manuscript about "The Long Theft: Episodes in the History of Enclosure." As of 2022, he is editing a volume Archives of Dissent, which is under advance contract with PM Press.

The historians Robert N. Proctor and Londa Schiebinger have credited Boal with coining the term "Agnotology" in 1992 to describe the intentional production of ignorance or doubt, often for commercial gain. Originally conceived to explain the behavior of tobacco companies, it has gained more recent currency in the context of commercially motivated climate change denial.

== Personal life ==
He is married to the archivist Gillian Boal.

== Publications ==
- Boal, Iain and James Brook, Resisting the Virtual Life: The Culture and Politics of Information City, (San Francisco: City Lights Books, 1995)
- As member of Retort, "Blood for Oil?" in London Review of Books (2005)
- As member of Retort, Afflicted Powers: Capital and Spectacle in a New Age of War (2009)
