= Race Riot (Warhol) =

1964 painting by Andy Warhol

- Artist: Andy Warhol
- Year: 1964
- Type: Acrylic and silkscreen
- Dimensions: 152.4 cm × 167.6 cm (60.0 in × 66.0 in)
- Location: Private collection

Race Riot is a 1964 acrylic and silkscreen painting by the American artist Andy Warhol that he executed in 1964. It fetched $62,885,000 at Christie's in New York on 13 May 2014. (Note: Anne Wagner titles the work Little Race Riot and dates it 1963.)

== Description ==
In 1963 Warhol began preparing for a large scale exhibition at the Sonnabend Gallery in Paris. Anxious to avoid a charge of mass-consumerism at his first major exhibition abroad, he chose a theme he initially called Death in America. These paintings, of subjects such as car crashes, suicides, food poisoning, the electric chair, gangster funerals, and the Atom Bomb, were to become known as the Death and Disaster paintings. In an interview at the time, he explained what had made him start:

I guess it was the big plane crash picture, the front page of a newspaper: 129 DIE. I was also painting the Marilyns. I realized that everything I was doing must have been Death. It was Christmas or Labor Day—a holiday—and every time you turned on the radio they said something like, "4 million are going to die." That started it. But when you see a gruesome picture over and over again, it doesn't really have any effect.

— Andy Warhol, ARTnews 1963

Detail from top left panel showing heightened contrast and newsprint like quality.

1963 was also the year of the Birmingham campaign in the Civil Rights Movement. Americans were shocked by a photo-essay published in Life magazine that showed young black protesters being fire-hosed and set upon by police dogs. These Life photographs were by Charles Moore, and the then president John F. Kennedy was to say of them, and of similar images by civil rights photographers of the time, that the events they depicted were "so much more eloquently reported by the news camera than by any number of explanatory words". Three of Moore's photographs were of a dog attacking a black man and although the theme was not strictly "Death", Warhol was sufficiently aware of their power to want to include them in his exhibition, consistent with his aim of showing the dark underside of the American Dream: "My show in Paris is going to be called 'Death in America.' I'll show the electric-chair pictures and the dogs in Birmingham and car wrecks and some suicide pictures." In all Warhol made some ten silkscreen painting on the theme. They became known as his Race Riot paintings (counterfactually, in reality the images were of a peaceful march disrupted by police), and they represent Warhol's only overtly political statement, although he himself insisted that Moore's photographs had merely "caught his eye".

The first four of these paintings (Pink Race Riot in the Museum Ludwig, Cologne; Mustard Race Riot, in the Museum Brandhorst, Munich; and two other examples whose whereabouts are currently unknown) were made in 1963 in direct response to the Life magazine photo-essay and feature all three of Moore's attack dogs photographs. Pink Race Riot was the painting exhibited at the Sonnabend Gallery in 1964. The remaining six paintings in the series, which Warhol called his "little Race Riots", date from 1964. Of these Race Riot, at nearly six feet square, is the largest and the only multicoloured example. It consists of four panels each depicting the same Charles Moore photograph of a black man fleeing a dog tearing at his trousers, the middle of the three that appeared in Life magazine. The panels are tinted in red, white and blue, possibly refracting the byline Life magazine gave Moore's photographs, They Fight a Fire That Won't Go Out. (Note: Brett Gorvy at Christie's remarks that it is almost as if the painting is burning from underneath.) The panels are a faithful representation of Moore's photograph, but with heightened contrast expressing a newsprint quality. Warhol used Moore's photographs without his permission, and Moore subsequently filed a lawsuit against him for copyright infringement. The case was settled out of court.

The painting was originally owned by Sam Wagstaff, who gave it to his partner Robert Mapplethorpe. Wagstaff also commissioned a print from Warhol, Birmingham Race Riot, as part of the series Ten Works by Ten Painters published in an edition of 500 by Wadsworth Athenaeum, Hartford, Connecticut.

== Provenance ==
- Leo Castelli Gallery, New York
- Sam Wagstaff, New York
- Robert Mapplethorpe, New York
- The Estate of Robert Mapplethorpe, New York
- Christie's, New York, 7 November 1989, lot 74
- Bruno Bischofberger, Zurich
- Mr. and Mrs. Oliver Stahel, Zurich
- Christie's, New York, 18 November 1992, lot 48
- Private collection, Monaco
- Gagosian Gallery (Christie's, New York, 13 May 2014: $62,885,000)

== Exhibition history ==
Various including:

- Chicago, Museum of Contemporary Art, Violence! In Recent American Art, November 1968 – January 1969, no. 40 (upper left and upper right panels exhibited).
- Pasadena Art Museum; Chicago, Museum of Contemporary Art; Eindhoven, Stedelijk van Abbemuseum; Paris, Musée d'art moderne de la ville de Paris; London, Tate Gallery and New York, Whitney Museum of American Art, Andy Warhol, May 1970 – June 1971, no. 31, Eindhoven, no. 44; Paris, no. 82; London, no. 104 (upper left, upper right and lower right panels exhibited).
- New York, Museum of Modern Art; Art Institute of Chicago; London, Hayward Gallery; Cologne, Museum Ludwig; Venice, Palazzo Grassi and Paris, Musée National d'Art Moderne Centre Georges Pompidou, Andy Warhol: A Retrospective, February 1989 – September 1990, p. 268, no. 275 (illustrated in color). New York and Chicago only.

== Bibliography ==
- Bonami, Francesco (2012). "How Warhol Did Not Murder Painting but Masterminded the Killing of Content". Walker Art Center. Archived from the original on 12 May 2014.
- Fairclough, Adam (2001) [1987]. To Redeem the Soul of America: The Southern Christian Leadership Conference and Martin Luther King, Jr. University of Georgia Press. ISBN 0820323462.
- Frei, George; Prints, Neil, eds. (2004). Warhol: Paintings and Sculpture 1964–1969, Vol. 2 (2 Vol. Set): The Andy Warhol Catalogue Raisonné. London: Phaidon Press. pp. 355, 357 and 384, no. 1420. ISBN 0714840874.
- Gorvy, Brett (2014). "Video: Andy Warhol's Race Riot, 1964". Christie's.
- Moore, Charles (17 May 1963). "They Fight a Fire That Won't Go Out". Life. 54 (20).
- Swenson, Gene (November 1963). "What is Pop Art? Interviews with Eight Painters (Part 1)". ARTnews. Archived from the original on 12 May 2014.
- Temkin, Anne; Lehmann, Claire (2014). "Ileana Sonnabend - Ambassador for the New" (PDF). Metropolitan Museum of Art. Archived (PDF) from the original on 13 May 2014.
- Wagner, Anne M (1996). "Warhol Paints History, or Race in America". Representations. 55 (Special Issue: Race and Representation: Affirmative Action): 98–119 (p. 100, plate 2). JSTOR 3043740.
