= Migiwa Orimo =

American installation artist (born 1957

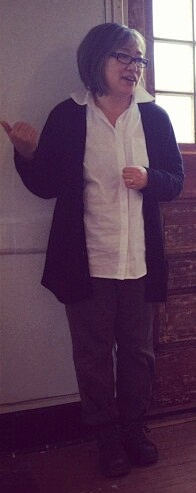
- In 2012
- Born: 1957 (age 67–68); Tokyo, Japan
- Citizenship: United States

Migiwa Orimo (born 1957) is a Japanese-born American mixed-media installation artist based in Yellow Springs, Ohio.

== Early and personal life ==
Orimo was born in Tokyo in 1957, the only child of an artist mother and writer father. Raised among a number of creative adults, Orimo was immersed in art from a young age. She attended college in Japan, where she studied literature and graphic design. She immigrated to the U.S. in 1981, after initially planning to spend two years in the country learning English. She traveled to Ohio to meet up with her aunt. There, she met her husband, Tony Dallas; the two married so Orimo could extend her visa to stay in the U.S. She received U.S. citizenship in 2003.

== Career ==
Orimo's art often intersects with language, particularly Japanese and English, and transcriptions such as morse code. She also considers texture to be an important aspect of her work. Her installations tie together "disparate elements" of "painting, drawing, sculpture, video and sound". She also creates screen-printed banners, which she produces through the Peoples Banner Project.

In addition to presenting her art in a gallery setting, Orimo has also installed art in public places, such as a phone booth set up in Yellow Springs in 2009.

She is based in Yellow Springs, Ohio.

== Exhibitions ==
=== Solo ===
- ]MARGINS[ (2024), Mariani Gallery, University of Northern Colorado

=== Group ===
- Nuclear Fallout: The Bomb in Three Archives (2018), Herndon Gallery, Antioch College, Yellow Springs, Ohio
- Elongated Shadows (2020), apexart, New York City
- Enactive Architecture (2022), Columbus, Ohio
- Women to Watch (2024), National Museum of Women in the Arts
- Memory Fields (2024), Weston Art Gallery, Cincinnati, Ohio
- BOOK (2025), Beeler Gallery of Columbus College of Art and Design

== Awards ==
- Individual Creativity Excellence Award (2008, 2013, 2021), Ohio Arts Council
- Headlands Center for the Arts Residency Award (2012)
