= Cheyenne Westphal =

German businesswoman (born 1967)

- Born: 1967 (age 58–59); Iserlohn, Germany
- Education: University of St. Andrews; University of California, Berkeley
- Children: 1

Cheyenne Westphal (born September 1967) is a German-born, London-based art dealer and art advisor. She was Global Chairwoman at auctioneers Phillips from March 2017 to June 2025 . She was worldwide head of contemporary art at Sotheby's until April 2016, having joined the firm in 1990.

Westphal joined Phillips in 2017 as Global Chairwoman, overseeing major sales and the company’s strategic expansion in the contemporary art market, leading to record years in 2021 and 2022. In 2019, she was named by Forbes as "the most powerful woman in contemporary art." During her tenure at Phillips, notable works sold included Peter Doig’s Rosedale ($28.8 million), which at the time set a record for the artist; Pablo Picasso’s La Dormeuse ($57.8 million); Mark Bradford’s Helter Skelter I ($10.4 million), which set the highest auction price at the time for a living African-American artist; and Jean-Michel Basquiat’s Untitled ($85 million). In May 2025, Phillips announced that Westphal would step down from her role after eight years with the auction house.

Before joining Phillips, Westphal served as Worldwide Head of Contemporary Art at Sotheby’s. She led sales that resulted in world records for Gerhard Richter (Abstraktes Bild, $46.3 million), Sigmar Polke (Jungle, $27.1 million), Piero Manzoni (Achrome, $20.2 million), and Alberto Burri (Saccho e Rosso, $13.2 million), among many others. Westphal presided over every Sotheby’s contemporary sale in Europe since 1999, including the most successful contemporary art auction in Europe in July 2015, which achieved a record-breaking $204.7 million.

Westphal brought a number of single-owner collections to market, including the Damien Hirst sale, Beautiful Inside My Head Forever, which raised $200.7 million in 2008. This was followed by the $140 million Helga and Walther Lauffs Collection of Post-War European and American Art and The Lenz Schoenberg Collection in 2010, yielding £23 million and setting nineteen auction records, many for art from the ZERO movement. She negotiated the sale of Count Duerckheim's Post-War German Art in 2011, which raised a record $92.2 million and set records for German artists.

In 1990, Westphal joined Sotheby’s after graduating from University of St Andrews in Scotland and studying contemporary art under Professor Anne Wagner at UC Berkeley in California.
