= Donald Simmons =

Donald Simmons may refer to:

- Don Simmons (politician) (1918–1986), Australian politician who sat in the South Australian House of Assembly
- Donald C. Simmons Jr. (born 1963), American educator and historian
- Don Simmons (ice hockey) (1931–2010), Canadian NHL goalie
- Don Simmons (artist) (born 1973), Canadian artist and writer
