= Michael Watts (geographer) =

American geographer (born 1951)

Michael J. Watts (born 1951 in England) is Professor Emeritus of Geography at the University of California, Berkeley. He retired in 2016. He is a leading critical intellectual figure of the academic left.

His first book, Silent Violence:Food, Famine and Peasantry in Northern Nigeria (1983, 2013), is considered a pioneering work in political ecology. Other published works include Reworking Modernity: Capitalisms and Symbolic Discontent (1992, with Allan Pred), Liberation Ecologies (1996, 2004, with Richard Peet), The Hettner Lectures: Geographies of Violence (2000), Violent Environments (2001, with Nancy Lee Peluso) and the Curse of the Black Gold (2008, with photojournalist Ed Kashi). Watts has also been an assistant editor of the award-winning New Encyclopedia of Africa (2008) and its predecessor, the Encyclopedia of Africa South of the Sahara (1997).

== Biography ==
External videos
- “Fellow Spotlight: Michael Watts”, American Academy in Berlin, 2016
- “The Local-Global Dialectic: A Geographer's Perspective“, Michael Watts, 2001

After spending his childhood in a village between Bath and Bristol, Watts attended University College London, from which he received his distinction bachelor's degree in geography in 1972.

Watts received his PhD in geography in 1979 from the University of Michigan. His PhD work was on agrarian change and politics in Northern Nigeria, based on over two years of fieldwork and archival research and supervised by Bernard Q. Neitschmann, before the Michigan Geography Department was disestablished. It was published in revised form as Silent Violence: Food, Famine and Peasantry in Northern Nigeria in 1983. Silent Violence is considered a pioneering work in the field of political ecology.

Watts joined the faculty of the Geography Department at UC Berkeley in 1979 and remained there his whole career. He served from 1994 to 2004 as Director of the Institute of International Studies, a program that promotes cross-disciplinary global and transnational research and training. He has supervised over 75 PhD students and post-docs, including those contributing to a Festschrift volume in 2017 edited by Chari, Friedberg, Gidwani, Ribot and Wolford.

Watts is married to Mary Beth Pudup, who is a UC Santa Cruz faculty member, and has two children. He is a member of the Retort collective, a Bay Area-based collective of radical intellectuals, with whom he authored the book Afflicted Powers: Capital and Spectacle in a New Age of War, published by Verso Books.

Watts is also on the advisory board of FFIPP-USA (Faculty for Israeli-Palestinian Peace-USA), a network of Palestinian, Israeli, and International faculty, and students, working for an end of the Israeli occupation of Palestinian territories and just peace. In 2021, with other faculty at the University of California, he joined a letter calling Palestinian activism "a global movement for liberation from settler colonialism and racial apartheid."

On 25 July 2007, Watts was shot in the hand in Port Harcourt, Nigeria by unknown gunmen who attacked the office of the National Point newspaper, apparently in an attempted robbery.

Watts is Non-resident Long-term Fellow for Programmes on the Political Economy of Development and Development Policy at Swedish Collegium for Advanced Study in Uppsala, Sweden.

== Scholarship ==
Watts works on a variety of themes from African development to contemporary geopolitics, social movements and oil politics. As Tom Perrault notes, his work charted a "rigorous and wide-ranging theoretical engagement with Marxian political economy", with contributions to the development of political ecology, struggles over resources, and – more recently – how the politics of identity play out in the contemporary world. His first major study, Silent Violence, dealt with the effects of colonialism on the susceptibility of Northern Nigerians to food shortage and famine. Over the last decade he has continued to work in Nigeria, but on the political ecology of oil and the effect of oil exploitation on Ogoni people in the Niger delta. He has also explored issues of global agriculture and food availability, gender and households, irrigation politics, and Islam.

Watts's work has been much debated in the social sciences, in terms of its attachment to Marxist and post-Marxist theory, and in terms of the appropriate role for academic thinking in contemporary struggles against inequality and poverty alleviation.

== Awards ==
- 2020, American Association of Geographers Lifetime Achievement Award
- 2017, Festschrift, Chari, S.; Freidberg, S.; Gidwani, V.; Ribot, J.; Wolford, W., eds. (2017). Other geographies : the influences of Michael Watts (First ed.). London: Wiley-Blackwell. ISBN 978-1-119-18476-8.
- 2016–2017, Berlin Prize (Siemens Fellowship), American Academy in Berlin
- 2010, Conover-Porter Award for Africana Bibliography or Reference Work, African Studies Association for New Encyclopedia of Africa (associate editor)
- 2007, Smuts Memorial Lecturer, University of Cambridge
- 2007, Robert McC. Netting Award, Cultural and Political Ecology Specialty Group, Association of American Geographers
- 2004, Fellow of the Center for Advanced Study in the Behavioral Sciences, Stanford University
- 2004, Awarded the Victoria Medal, Royal Geographical Society
- 2003, Guggenheim fellow for his research on oil, politics and economies of violence in Nigeria
- 2000, winner, Conover-Porter Award for Africana Bibliography or Reference Work, African Studies Association for Encyclopedia of Africa South of the Sahara (assistant editor); also 1998 honorable mention
- 1999, Hettner Lecture, Universität Heidelberg
- 1997–1998, Chancellor's Professorship, University of California, Berkeley
- 1994, Distinguished Research Award, Association of American Geographers
- 1984, Distinguished Teaching Award, National Council for Geographic Education

== Books ==
- Levien, M, MJ Watts & Y Hairong (eds.). 2019. Agrarian Marxism. Routledge.
- Rajan, R., A. Romero, and M.J. Watts (eds.). 2016. Genealogies of Environmental Thought: The Lost Works of Clarence Glacken. Charlottesville, VA: University of Virginia Press.
- Horowitz L.S. and M.J. Watts (eds.). 2016. Grassroots Environmental Governance: Community engagements with industry. London: Routledge.
- H Appel, A Mason and MJ Watts. (eds.) 2015. Subterranean Estates: Life Worlds of Oil and Gas. Ithaca. Cornell University Press.
- Boal, I., C. Winslow, J. Stone and MJ Watts (eds.). 2012. West of Eden: Communes and Utopia in Northern California. Oakland: PM Press.
- Peet R, Robbins P and MJ Watts (eds.). 2011. Global Political Ecology. Routledge.
- Watts MJ (ed.) with photographs by E. Kashi. 2008. Curse of the Black Gold: 50 Years of Oil in the Niger Delta. Brooklyn NY: Powerhouse Books.
- Associate editor. 2007. New Encyclopedia of Africa (ed. Joseph C. Miller) Simon and Schuster, New York (5 volumes). Second Edition. (ISBN 9780684314549) Winner of the 2010 Conover-Porter Award for Africana Bibliography or Reference Work, Africana Librarians Council; Update to Encyclopedia of Africa South of the Sahara (1997), a 1998 Conover-Porter honorable mention, a CHOICE Outstanding Academic Title, Library Journal's Best Reference awardee
- Retort collective (Iain Boal, T.J. Clark, Joseph Matthews, Michael Watts). 2005. Afflicted Powers: Capital and Spectacle in a New Age of War. London: Verso.
- Peet, R & Watts, MJ (eds). 2004. Liberation Ecologies (2nd edition). Routledge. (first edition 1996)
- Peluso N. and MJ Watts (eds.). 2001. Violent Environments. Ithaca: Cornell University Press.
- Watts, MJ. 2000. The Hettner Lectures: Geographies of Violence. Heidelberg: University of Heidelberg. review
- Johnston RJ, D Gregory, G Pratt, MJ Watts, DM Smith. (eds) 2000. Dictionary of Human Geography. Oxford: Blackwell.
- Goodman, DS, and MJ Watts (eds.) 1997. Globalising Food: Agrarian Questions and Global Restructuring . London and New York: Routledge.
- RJ Johnson, P Taylor, and MJ Watts (eds.) 1995. Geographies of Global Change. Blackwell. Second Edition 1998, Third Edition in 2002.
- P.D. Little & M.J. Watts (eds.) 1994. Living under contract: contract farming and agrarian transformation in sub-Saharan Africa. Madison, University of Wisconsin Press.
- Pred, A. and M.J. Watts (eds.) Reworking Modernity: Capitalisms and Symbolic Discontent. Rutgers University Press, New Brunswick, New Jersey.
- Watts, M.J. 1987 (ed.). State, Oil and Agriculture in Nigeria. Institute of International Studies Press, University of California, Berkeley.
- Watts, MJ. 1983. Silent Violence: Food, Famine and Peasantry in Northern Nigeria. Berkeley: University of California Press. [runner-up for Herskovitz Prize, 1984, reprinted 2013, University of Georgia Press]

== Articles and chapters ==
- Watts, M. J.; Elden, S. (3 January 2015). "Interview with Michael Watts: On Nigeria, political ecology, geographies of violence, and the history of the discipline". Politics & Political Theory. Society and Space. Archived from the original on 8 April 2020.
- Watts, M. J. (January 2010). "Now and Then". Antipode. 41 (s1): 10–26. Bibcode:2010Antip..41S..10W. doi:10.1111/j.1467-8330.2009.00714.x.
- Watts, M. J. (Summer 2009). "Oil, Development, and the Politics of the Bottom Billion". Macalester International. 24 11.
- Watts, M. J. (2009). "Reflections". Development and Change. 40 (5): 1191–1214.
- Watts, M. J. (2009). "Radicalism, Writ Large and Small". In Pugh, J. (ed.). What Is Radical Politics Today?. London: Palgrave. pp. 103–112. doi:10.1057/9780230251144_12. ISBN 978-0-230-23626-4.
- Watts, M. J. (12 August 2009). "Slipping into Darkness: Nigeria on the brink". Counterpunch. Archived from the original on 20 September 2015.
- Watts, M. J. (2007). "Revolutionary Islam". In Pred, Allan; Gregory, Derek (eds.). Violent Geographies. London: Routledge. pp. 175–205. ISBN 9780203944585.
- Watts, M. J. (2007). "The sinister political life of community" (PDF). In Creed, G. (ed.). The Romance of Community. SAR Press. Archived from the original (PDF) on 6 May 2006.
- Watts, M. J.; Boal, I. (December 2006). "The Liberal International". Radical Philosophy. 140: 40–45.
- Watts, M. J. (2006). "Empire of Oil". Monthly Review. 58 (4): 1–16. doi:10.14452/MR-058-04-2006-08_1.
- Watts, M. J. (2006). "Neither There War nor their Peace/All Quiet on the Eastern Front". In Enwezor, Okwui (ed.). The Unhomely. Fundación Bienal Internacional de Arte Contemporáneo de Sevilla. pp. 27–31. ISBN 8493487937. (reprinted as "All Quiet on the Eastern Front". New Left Review. 41: 88–92. September 2006.)
- Watts, M. J. (2006). "Culture, Development and Global Neoliberalism". In Radcliffe, S. (ed.). Culture and Development in a Globalising World (PDF). London: Routledge. pp. 30–58.
- Watts, M. J.; Zalik, A. (April 2006). "Imperial Oil". Socialist Review.
- Watts, M. J. (2005). "Baudelaire over Berea, Simmel over Sandton?". Public Culture. 17 (1): 181–192. doi:10.1215/08992363-17-1-181.
- Watts, M. J. (November 2005). "Righteous Oil?: Human rights, the oil complex and corporate social responsibility" (PDF). Annual Review of Environment and Resources. 30 (1): 373–407. Bibcode:2005ARER...30..373W. doi:10.1146/annurev.energy.30.050504.144456. Archived from the original (PDF) on 6 May 2006.
- Watts, M. J. (2004). "Resource Curse? Governmentality, Oil and Power in the Niger Delta, Nigeria". Geopolitics. 9 (1): 50–80. doi:10.1080/14650040412331307832.
- McKeon, N.; Watts, M. J.; Wolford, W. (2004). Peasant Associations in Theory and Practice (Report). Civil Society and Social Movements Programme Paper. Vol. 8. UNSRID.
- Watts, M. J. (2003). "Thinking With the Blood". Singapore Journal of Tropical Geography. 24 (2). doi:10.1111/1467-9493.00156.
- Watts, M. J. (2003). "Development and Governmentality". Singapore Journal of Tropical Geography. 24 (1): 6–34. Bibcode:2003SJTG...24....6W. doi:10.1111/1467-9493.00140.
- Watts, M. J. (2003). "Alternative Modern: Development as Cultural Geography". In Pile, S.; Thrift, N.; Anderson, K.; Domosh, M. (eds.). Handbook of Cultural Geography. London: Sage. pp. 433–453.
- Watts, M. J. (2002). Migrations. Commentary on Sebastiao Salgado (Report). Occasional Paper. Vol. 26. Townsend Center for the Humanities, University of California, Berkeley. pp. 35–42.
- Watts, M. J. (2002). "Chronicle of a Death Foretold: Some Thoughts on Peasants and the Agrarian Question". Österreichische Zeitschrift für Geschichtswissenschaften. 4: 22–51. (and commentary pp. 51–61).
- Watts, M. J. (2002). "Hour of darkness". Geographica Helvetica. 57 (1): 5–18. doi:10.5194/gh-57-5-2002.
- Watts, M. J. (2002). "Green Capitalism, Green Governmentality". American Behavioral Scientist. 45 (9): 1313–1317. doi:10.1177/0002764202045009002.
- Watts, M. J. (2001). "Lost in Space". Progress in Human Geography. 25 (4): 625–628.
- Watts, M. J. (2001). "2001 Black Acts". New Left Review. 9: 125–140. doi:10.64590/8qd.
- Watts, M. J. (2000). "1968 and all that...". Progress in Human Geography. 25 (2): 157–188. doi:10.1191/030913201678580467.
- Watts, M. J. (2000). "Violent Geographies: speaking the unspeakable and the politics of space". City & Society. 13 (1): 83–115.
- Watts, M. J. (2000). "Development Ethnographies". Ethnography. 2 (2): 283–300. doi:10.1177/14661380122230939.
- Watts, M. J. (2000). "Development at the Millennium". Geographische Zeitschrift. 88 (2): 67–93.
- Watts, M. J. (2000). "Political Ecology". In Barnes, T.; Sheppard, E. (eds.). A Companion To Economic Geography. Oxford: Blackwell. pp. 257–275. doi:10.1002/9781405166430.ch16. ISBN 9781405166430.
- Watts, M. J. (2000). "The Great Tablecloth". In Clark, G.; Gertler, M.; Feldmann, M. P. (eds.). The Oxford Handbook of Economic Geography. London: Oxford University Press. pp. 195–215. ISBN 9780199250837.
- Watts, M. J. (1999). "Islamic Modernities". In Halston, James (ed.). Cities and Citizenship. Durham, NC: Duke University Press. pp. 67–102.
- Watts, M. J. (1999). "Collective Wish Images: Geographical Imaginaries and the Crisis of Development". In Allen, John; Massey, Doreen (eds.). Human Geography Today. Cambridge: Polity Press. pp. 85–107.
