= Allan Pred =

American geographer

Allan Richard Pred (1936–2007) was an internationally known American geographer and professor at the University of California at Berkeley He wrote more than 20 books and monographs, translated into seven languages, and over 70 articles and book chapters.

Pred was born in the Bronx, New York City, in 1936. He enrolled at Antioch College in 1953, at age 16, and graduated first in his class in 1957. He received his Ph.D. in 1962 from the University of Chicago, and then became an assistant professor at Berkeley, and was appointed full professor in 1971 at the age of 34. He served as the chair of the UC Berkeley Department of Geography between 1979 and 1988, and was made a professor of the Graduate School in 2005, the most senior Berkeley position. In 1991, he was a Fellow at the Swedish Collegium for Advanced Study in Uppsala, Sweden.

He met his wife Hjördis, in San Francisco in 1962; they moved between Berkeley and Sweden on a yearly basis, raising bi-lingual children, Michele Pred and Joseph Pred. He has one grandchild, Linnea Allana Morlan Pred.

His books are required reading in multiple college courses.

== Publications ==
=== Books written ===
- External relations of cities during "Industrial Revolution": with a case study of Göteborg, Sweden: 1868-1890. (1962)
- Spatial dynamics of U.S. urban-industrial growth, 1800-1914; interpretive and theoretical essays (1966)
- Behavior and location. Foundations for a geographic and dynamic location theory 1967 .
- Urban growth and the circulation of information: the United States system of cities, 1790-1840 (1973)
- Systems of cities and information flows. Two essays. with Gunnar E. Törnqvist.
- Major job-providing organizations and systems of cities (1974)
- City-systems in advanced economies : past growth, present processes and future development options (1977)
- Urban growth and city systems in the United States, 1840-1860 (1980)
- Place, practice, and structure : social and spatial transformation in southern Sweden, 1750-1850 (1986)
- Making histories and constructing human geographies : the local transformation of practice, power relations, and consciousness (1990)
- Lost words and lost worlds : modernity and the language of everyday life in late nineteenth-century Stockholm (1990)
- Reworking modernity : capitalisms and symbolic discontent with Michael John Watts. (1992)
- Recognizing European modernities : a montage of the present (1995)
- Even in Sweden: Racisms, Racialized Spaces, and the Popular Geographical Imagination (2000)
- Past is not dead : facts, fictions, and enduring racial stereotypes (2004)

=== Books edited ===
- Space and time in geography : essays dedicated to Torsten Hägerstrand (1981)
- Violent geographies : fear, terror, and political violence with Derek Gregory (2007)

== Representative recent articles ==
- "Place as Historically Contingent Process : Structuration and the Time-Geography of Becoming Places." Annals of the Association of American Geographers 74 (1984), 279-297.
- "Somebody Else, Somewhere Else: Racisms, Racialized Spaces and the Popular Geo-graphical Imagination in Sweden". Antipode, 29 (1997), 383–416.
- "The Nature of Denaturalized Consumption and Everyday Life," in Bruce Braun and Noel Castree, eds., Remaking Reality: Nature at the Millennium (London and New York: Routledge, 1998), 153-172.
- "Memory and the Cultural Reworking of Crisis: Racisms and the Current Moment of Danger in Sweden, or Wanting it Like Before," Society and Space, 16 (1998), 635-664.
- "Unspeakable Spaces: Racisms Past and Present on Exhibit in Stockholm, or the Unad-dressable Addressed." City & Society, 13 (2000), 119-159.

== Awards and honors ==
- Anders Retzius Medal - e - by the Swedish Society for Anthropology and Geography in 1991
- Polish Academy of Sciences
- Association of American Geographers, in 1978 and 2005.
- Elected a corresponding fellow of the British Academy in 2005.
- Willy Brandt Professorship in 2001 at Uppsala University
- honorary doctorate from the Faculty of Social Sciences Uppsala University in Sweden in 1992.
- visiting appointments at the École des Hautes Études in Paris and the University of Lund in Sweden
