= Summer Brenner =

U.S. female writer and activist (born 1945)

- Born: March 17, 1945 (age 81); Washington, D.C., U.S.
- Occupations: Writer, activist
- Children: Felix Brenner, Joanna Bean Martin
- Website: summerbrenner.com

Summer Brenner (born March 17, 1945) is an American writer and activist. Brenner's works include short stories, novellas, noir crime, social justice youth novels, poetry, and a memoir.

== Early life and education ==
Brenner was born in Washington, D.C.

== Career ==
Brenner's publications include Dust: A Memoir; Dancers and the Dance; My Life in Clothes; two noir novels with political themes, I-5 and Nearly Nowhere, also released in France as Presque nulle part through Gallimard's Série noire.

Brenner's youth novel Richmond Tales, Lost Secrets of the Iron Triangle was chosen as the first "One City, One Book" selection for the City of Richmond (California) and selected by the California Teachers Association for Read Across America.

Oakland Tales, Lost Secrets of The Town received an award from the Oakland Heritage Alliance (OHA).

Her work The Missing Lover is three novellas with illustrations by Lewis Warsh. Her 2024 memoir, Dust, was featured in Literary Hub in June 2024.

Her literary papers are available at the University of Delaware's Special Collections.

== Community projects ==
Brenner is a member of the Retort collective and a participant in the Al-Mutanabbi Street Starts Here Project (since 2007), archived at the Rare Book and Manuscript Library at Columbia University.

Where We're From is an inter-generational, cross-cultural oral history, poetry, and photography project for Richmond youth and their families in partnership with photographer Ruth Morgan and Community Works West.

== Brenner's works ==
=== Fiction ===
- Dancers and the Dance. Minneapolis: Coffee House Press. 1990. ISBN 0-918273-75-7
- Presque nulle part. Paris: Gallimard Série noire 2554. 1999. ISBN 2-07-049800-X
- I-5, A Novel of Crime, Transport, and Sex. Oakland: PM Press. 2009. ISBN 978-1-60486-019-1
- My Life in Clothes. Pasadena: Red Hen Press. 2010. ISBN 978-1-59709-163-3
- Nearly Nowhere. Oakland: PM Press. 2012. ISBN 978-1-60486-306-2
- The Missing Lover. Brooklyn: Spuyten Duyvil, 2022. ISBN 978-1-933132-28-0, 978-1-956005-50-9

=== Non-fiction ===
- Dust, A Memoir. Brooklyn, Spuyten Duyvil, 2024. ISBN 978-1-959556-46-6.

=== Novels for youth ===
- Ivy, Tale of a Homeless Girl in San Francisco. Berkeley: Creative Arts. 2000. Illustrated by Marilyn Bogerd. ISBN 0-88739-287-3
- Richmond Tales, Lost Secrets of the Iron Triangle. Berkeley: Time & Again Press. 2009. Illustrated by Miguel "Bounce" Perez. ISBN 978-0-9779741-4-6
- Ivy, Homeless in San Francisco. Oakland: PM Press/Daly City: ReachandTeach.com 2011. Illustrated by Brian Bowes. ISBN 978-1-60486-317-8
- Oakland Tales, Lost Secrets of The Town. Berkeley: Time & Again Press. 2014. Illustrated by Miguel "Bounce" Perez. ISBN 978-0-9779741-6-0

=== Poetry collections / chapbooks ===
- Everyone Came Dressed as Water. Albuquerque: The Grasshopper Press. 1973.
- From the Heart to the Center. Berkeley: The Figures. 1977.
- The Soft Room. Berkeley: The Figures. 1978.
- One Minute Movies. San Francisco: Thumbscrew Press. 1996.
- The Missing Lover, collages by Lewis Warsh. Brooklyn: Spuyten Duyvil. 2006.
- Do You Ever Think of Me? Ontario: Rob McLennan above/ground press. 2021.

=== Anthologies (selection) ===
- Rising Tides: 20th Century Women Poets (ed. Laura Chester). New York: Washington Square Press, Simon & Schuster. 1973.
- Deep Down: The New Sensual Writing by Women (ed. Laura Chester). Boston: Faber & Faber. 1988. ISBN 0-571-12957-9.
- The Unmade Bed: Sensual Writing on Married Love (ed. Laura Chester). New York: HarperCollins. 1992. ISBN 0-06-016609-6.
- The Stiffest Corpse (ed. Andrei Codrescu). San Francisco: City Lights Books. 1989. ISBN 0-87286-213-5.
- American Poets Say Good-Bye to the 20th Century (ed. Codrescu & Rosenthal). New York: Four Walls Eight Windows. 1996. ISBN 1-56858-071-1.
- Infinite City, A San Francisco Atlas, essay “Red Sinking, Green Soaring” (Rebecca Solnit). Berkeley: University of California Press. 2010. ISBN 978-0-520-26249-2.
- Send My Love and a Molotov Cocktail: Stories of Crime, Love and Rebellion (ed. Phillips & Gibbons). Oakland: PM Press. 2011. ISBN 978-1-60486-096-2.
- Al-Mutanabbi Street Starts Here: Poets and Writers Respond to the March 5, 2007 Bombing of Baghdad's "Street of Booksellers" (ed. Beau Beausoleil & Deema Shehabi, guest editor Summer Brenner). Oakland: PM Press. 2012. ISBN 978-1-60486-590-5.
- Jewish Noir (ed. Kenneth Wishnia). Oakland: PM Press. 2015. ISBN 978-1-62963-111-0.
- The Year’s Best Crime and Mystery Stories 2016 (ed. Rusch & Helfers). Toronto: Kobo Inc. 2016. ISBN 978-1-987879-43-8.
- River of Fire: Commons, Crisis and the Imagination (ed. Cal Winslow). Arlington, MA: The Pumping Station. 2016. ISBN 978-0-9849216-6-9.
- Berkeley Noir (ed. Jerry Thompson & Owen Hill). Brooklyn: Akashic Books. 2020. ISBN 978-1-61775-797-6.

== See also ==
- List of American novelists
- List of American poets
- List of biographers
- List of children's literature writers
- List of crime fiction writers
- List of short story writers
- List of people from California
- List of people from Washington, D.C.
- List of women writers
