= Clark Clark =

American artist

- Born: Clark Stoeckley; 1982 or 1983 (age 43–44); United States
- Movement: Street art
- Title: Assistant professor

Academic background
- Education: Performance and interactive media art
- Alma mater: Brooklyn College

Academic work
- Discipline: Art and Graphic Design
- Institutions: American University of Kuwait
- Website: clarkstoeckley.com

Clark Stoeckley (born 1982 or 1983), also known as Clark Clark, is an interdisciplinary artist born in the United States. He is currently an Assistant Professor of Art and Graphic Design at American University of Kuwait. and was previously an instructor at Bloomfield College in New Jersey where he taught Painting, Drawing, and Experiments in Digital and Analog Media. He holds an MFA in Performance and Interactive Media Arts from Brooklyn College.

== Artwork ==
=== LOVE to VOTE ===
He was associated with the graffiti urban art movement under the pseudonym Clark Clark. He painted "VOTE" stencils for the 2008 presidential elections. He originally started the project in the mid-west swing states, but it quickly expanded nationwide. The design was an homage to the artist Robert Indiana and his Love (sculpture) artwork. He returned to painting VOTE murals in Wisconsin in July 2020.

=== Evolve America ===
On the Fourth of July, 2010, Clark's painting on a United States flag, titled "Evolve America", was censored from the "Reclaiming Space" art show at Clinton Hill Brooklyn's Gallery House. Clark was told the building owner was notified by the property manager of the painting, and the owner called his lawyer to demand it be removed. The Tau Delta Phi-Delta Gamma Theta Alumni Association, an organization for alumni of a Pratt Institute fraternity, owns the building, but gallery curator Jonathan Levy claimed he was the one to make the decision.

=== New York City Pranksters ===
During a panel called “The Art of Pranks” at the 2011 College Art Association (CAA) conference Stoeckley presented a paper titled “New York City pranksters”. Dressed as police officer, he identified himself as a member of the NYPD Vandal Squad Task Force. He explained that he was a former undercover detective in the East Village who became a “street-art archivist” and was eventually promoted to the rank of lieutenant for his insider knowledge of graffiti crews and activist groups. He claimed, “This is the stuff that really brightens our day, and in many cases teaches cops like me a lesson about the Constitution.”

=== WikiLeaks Truck ===
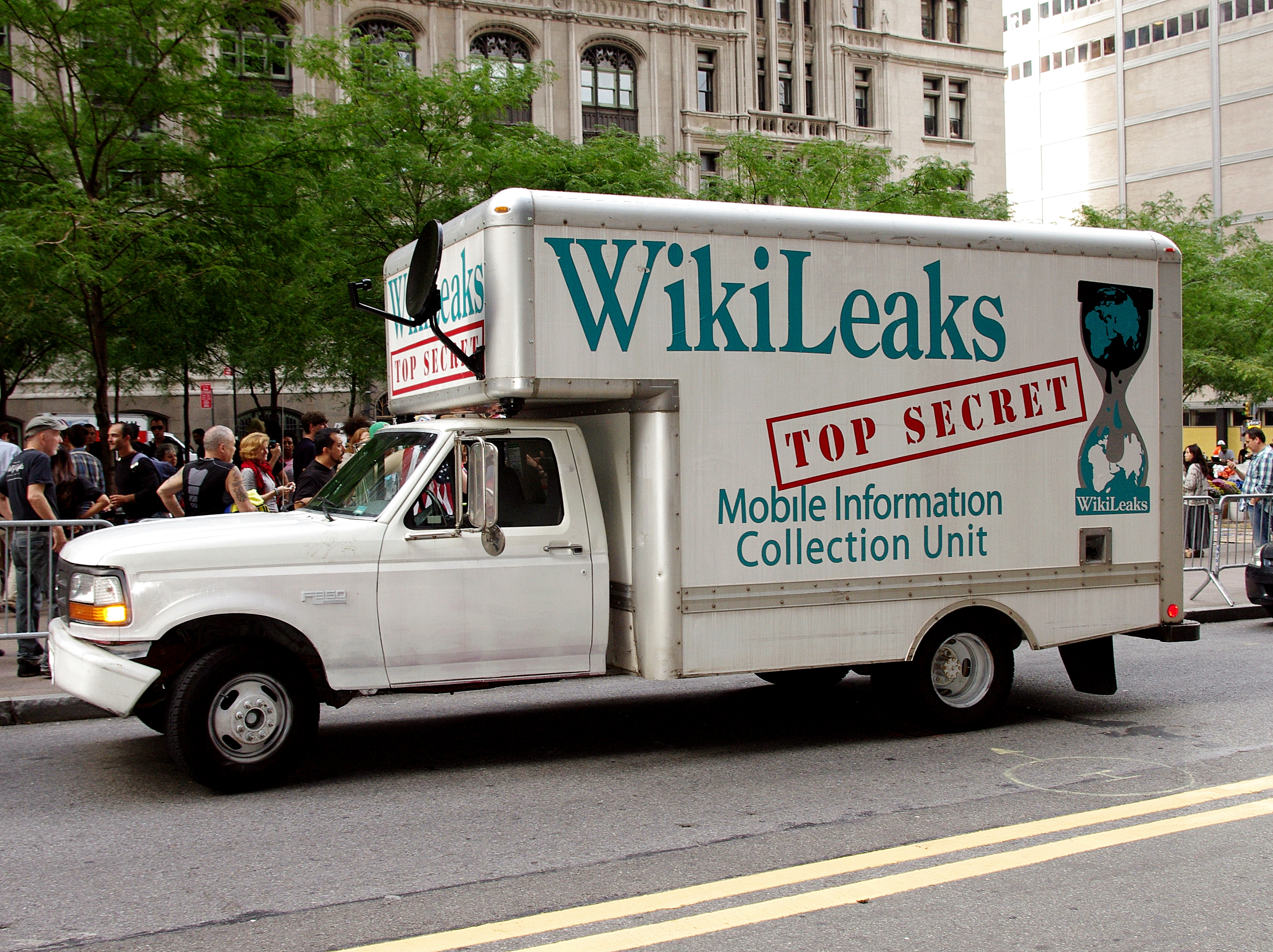
WikiLeaks Truck at Occupy Wall Street

In 2011 Stoeckley decorated a former U-Haul truck to read “WikiLeaks Top Secret Mobile Information Collection Unit” and “Release Bradley Manning”. He parked the truck adjacent to Occupy protests in New York City and Washington D.C. The day following the eviction of Occupy Wall Street, he was arrested near Zuccotti Park and the New York Police Department towed the truck and lost it. In response he sued the City of New York. After it was returned he attempted to sell the vehicle on eBay in 2012 but all bidders backed out after the auction. He continued to own the truck for two more years and drove it on Fort George Meade Army Base in Maryland during the military trial of Chelsea Manning.

=== The United States vs. Private Chelsea Manning: A Graphic Account from Inside the Courtroom ===
From 2011 to 2013 Stoeckley covered the court martial of former Army intelligence analyst Chelsea Manning as an independent courtroom sketch artist. In 2014 OR Books published a graphic book he authored and illustrated along with a preface written by WikiLeaks founder Julian Assange. The book has been translated into Turkish. The drawings have been exhibited at the Paul Robeson Galleries at Rutgers-Newark, Cecille R. Hunt Gallery at Webster University, Kunsthal Charlottenborg in Copenhagen, and Hartware MedienKunstVerein in Dortmund, Germany.

=== Feral Felines ===
Stoeckley has been photographing stray cats in the Middle East and posting them to Instagram since moving to Kuwait in 2016. In February 2020 He exhibited these photos at EIDIA House in Brooklyn, NY.

=== Murals ===
In 2024, Clark painted geometric abstract murals on electrical substations in Salmiya, Kuwait. This was organized by the Kuwait National Council for Culture, Arts, and Letters Al Fenn Al Thalith public mural project.

== Bibliography ==
- Stoeckley, Clark (2014). The United States vs. Private Chelsea Manning: A Graphic Account from Inside the Courtroom, Paperback ISBN 978-1-939293-27-5 • E-book ISBN 978-1-939293-28-2.
- Stoeckley, Clark (2013) “How Does a Patriot Act?”, Media-N Journal, CAA Conference Edition, Volume 9, Number 2, Summer 2013

== See also ==
- Graffiti
- Urban culture
- Art graffiti
- Street Art
- Gifted Art
- WikiLeaks
- Chelsea Manning
- Contemporary Art
