= EIDIA =

Paul Lamarre and Melissa Wolf as EIDIA

EIDIA (pronounced "idea") is the pseudonym under which the American transdisciplinary artists Paul Lamarre and Melissa P. Wolf have collaborated since 1986.

Lamarre (born in Monroe, Michigan, 1950), was the oldest of seven children in a large Roman Catholic family. His early inspiration to be an American contemporary artist came as a child seeing the Diego Rivera, Detroit Industry Murals at the Detroit Institute of Art. Lamarre received his BFA for painting, ceramics and photography from the University of Michigan, graduating in 1979. He was mentored there by the abstract expressionist painter Gerome Kamrowski who actually encouraged Lamarre to "drop out" and move to New York. However, Lamarre completed his degree graduating magna cum laude and, after a brief spell in Chicago, Illinois, moved to New York City in 1980 where he still lives and works with his wife and art collaborator Melissa P. Wolf. The duo, called EIDIA, began working together while Lamarre was living at the Chelsea Hotel (to create The Chelsea Tapes video series). This work was made possible by a fellowship from the New York Creative Artist's Program Service.

Melissa P. Wolf (born in Buffalo, New York) attended Syracuse University, Boston Museum School, Tufts University and Pratt Institute Brooklyn, New York.

The name EIDIA (created by Lamarre) is derived from the ancient Greek word for idea, "eidos", but the acronym has many possible meanings that Lamarre and Wolf outlined in their 1978 manifesto: Each Idea Defines Itself Aesthetically; Esthetic Interpretations Directs Imaginative Action; Everything I Do Is Art; Every Individual Does Individual Art; Every Individual Develops Ideal Aesthetics; Every Intellect Develops Intuitive Art; and Ecological Involvement Demands Immediate Action/Individual Action.

EIDIA approaches their work in many ways, playing with different concepts and materials simultaneously. Over the years, they have worked in sculpture, photography, painting and video and film, presenting everything from static objects to multimedia installations. For years, they have purposefully worked outside of traditional gallery systems. EIDIA House, founded by Lamarre and Wolf, is a meeting place and forum for artists, scholars, poets, writers, architects and others who are interested in the arts as instrument for positive social change (a concept dubbed "idée force" by the late French sociologist, anthropologist and philosopher Pierre Bourdieu). The intent of EIDIA House is to "broaden aesthetic research, promote a comprehensive expansion of the influence of art on a world wide basis, encourage 'green' architecture, and create an authentic forum for social change originating from the art world". Although EIDIA House can be located anywhere, at the moment it is based in Lamarre and Wolf's home and studio space, located in the Williamsburg area of New York City's Brooklyn borough.

== Major works ==
Lamarre and Wolf began their collaboration in 1983 with the video series The Chelsea Tapes, a series of 26 video vignettes forming an autobiographical diary of Lamarre's extended stay at the famous Chelsea Hotel in Manhattan. Inspired by the fact that Dylan Thomas, Virgil Thomson, Viva and Sid Vicious all lived at the Hotel, he sought to capture in video what influences, if any, the Hotel could have on his work. Lamarre began shooting in 1983 and soon found a collaborator in Melissa P. Wolf after they met at a New Museum opening. (At that time, the museum was still up-and-coming under the driving force of its sole founder Marcia Tucker.) Wolf became chief cameraman and editor of The Chelsea Tapes.

Their next video and book project, FOOD SEX ART the Starving Artists' Cookbook (1986–1991), chronicled approximately 150 artists cooking in the US, Europe and Russia. While expounding on the artists' relationship between art and life, FOOD SEX ART the Starving Artists' Cookbook is also a portrait series on the artist in society and a video documentation of the social-economic condition of the arts community in downtown New York and internationally.

THE DECONSUMPTIONISTS 2005-present, EIDIA, exhibition, Sydney College of the Arts 2011

Continuing their work in video, EIDIA went on to make the award-winning documentary the nea tapes (1995–2001), about the threatened dismantling of The National Endowment for the Arts. The piece is held in the library collections of over 200 universities, colleges and art institutes. Based on the nea tapes archive, Lamarre and Wolf interviewed over 300 artists, curators, art professionals, politicians and religious persons on their views on the status of American art in the late 1990s. the nea tapes also had the distinction of being screened in the US Capitol Building, Washington DC, under the auspices of the office of the Representative Jerrold Nadler.

EIDIA's performance/installation DECONSUMPTION (2001 to 2007) was modeled on the idea of "more production of less". They performed the "sale" of numerous found objects (reclaimed by EIDIA as "art") purchased by the thousands of visitors to EIDIA House. With this piece, their production of artistic matter shifted from creating works using new materials to re-introducing, re-considering, re-shaping and recycling pre-existing items (remarkably, before the "green" era ever began). DECONSUMPTION has been renamed and reformulated since 9/11, becoming DECONSUMPTION & THE DECONSUMPTIONISTS . This roaming installation consists of a 48-foot semi-trailer that serves as a platform for EIDIA's current dialogue and aesthetic research. The trailer houses 171 boxes that contain, among other things, thirty years worth of collective works, ephemera, and correspondence. The trailer was shown for the first time at the Sydney College of the Arts in Australia in 2011. (An earlier version was presented in New Mexico at the Santa Fe Art Institute in 2006.)

EIDIA's current curatorial project Plato's Cave (2009 to 2015) is based on Plato's Allegory of the Cave, and inspired by Art & Project. Invited artists create in situ installations and limited edition through the EIDIA House studio.

== Collections / collectors ==
EIDIA has exhibited nationally and internationally. Their work is held in numerous private collections, including those of: Bettina Bancroft and Andrew Klink, Thomas P. Basile, Brad Buckley, Peter Carlson, John Conomos, Matt Delbridge, Beth Rudin DeWoody, Scott Donovan, Ronald Feldman, Fred Fishkin, Lea Freid, Alex Gawronski, Peter Grass, Agnes Gund, Al Hansen, Craig Hatkoff, Paul Judelson, Gerome Kamrowski, Jeffery Lew, Vera List, Jane Lombard, Robert Mahoney, The Peter Michaelson Foundation, Peter and Eileen Norton, Ruth and Marvin Sackner, Satprakash, Willoughby Sharp, Rodney Sur, Marcia Tucker, Tom Warren and Bob Witz.

Among museums, libraries and other institutions with their work are The Art Institute of Chicago, Banff Art Center Library, The Cleveland Institute of Art, CAM, Contemporary Arts Museum Houston, Harvard University Fogg Museum Library, Illinois State University in Normal, the Institute of Contemporary Arts in London, Michigan State University, New York University Bobst Library, The Museum of Fine Arts in Houston, The Museum of Modern Art, The National Gallery of Art in Washington, D.C., The New Museum, Pennsylvania Academy of the Fine Arts, Philadelphia Museum of Art, Rutgers University, San Antonio Art Institute, Stedelijk Museum in Amsterdam, Toledo Museum of Art, University of California Los Angeles Art Library, The Walker Art Center, The Wexner Center for the Arts, The Whitney Museum of American Art and Yale University Library.

== Awards and honors ==
2014 Artist residency at Museum of Contemporary Art Detroit (MOCAD), DEPE Space (Department of Education and Public Engagement) June 2014, with The Deconsumptionists, Art As Archive 48ft semi-trailer in situ at MOCAD. In 2011, EIDIA received a Fellowship Residency, exhibition, and Research Affiliation status from the University of Sydney for their DECONSUMPTIONIST project. Other accolades include a Residency and Scholarship at the Santa Fe Art Institute (2006), The Nathan Cummings Foundation (2000), Open Society Institute, Soros Documentary Fund Fellowship (1997 and 1999), Individual Artist Grant from New York Kunsthalle (1996), Citizens Exchange Council / International ArtsLink Fellowship for Collaborative Projects (1994), Artists Space Individual Artists' Grant (1989), New York Foundation for the Arts Video Fellowship (1987), Best Non-Narrative Video at the San Francisco International Film Festival (1986) and The Kitchen's Media Bureau Grant and artist residency Experimental Television Center in Owego, New York (1985 and 1984).

== Influences ==
EIDIA cites: Marcel Duchamp, Joseph Beuys, Constantin Brâncuși, Frank Lloyd Wright, Ai Weiwei, Noam Chomsky, William Rodriguez, Pierre Bourdieu, Le Corbusier, Frank Gehry, Immanuel Kant, Plato, Socrates, Bertolt Brecht, Tennessee Williams, Charles Bukowski, Jean-Paul Sartre, Marcel Broodthaers, Louise Bourgeois, Julian Assange, Diego Rivera, David Smith, Ilya Kabakov, Piet Mondrian, Yves Klein, Kazimir Malevich, Rainer Werner Fassbinder, Sergei Eisenstein, Stanley Kubrick, Marina Abramović, Alexander Rodchenko, Piet Mondrian, Ludwig Wittgenstein, Gilbert & George, Charles Burchfield and Jean-Luc Godard.

== Books ==
- Paul Lamarre, Everything I Do Is Art. My Life Is Not My Own. (April 11 - May 6, 1989), essay by Robert Mahoney, exhibition catalog, Barbara Braathen Gallery, New York
- Paul Lamarre and Melissa P. Wolf, FOOD SEX ART the Starving Artists' Cookbook, (1991), introduction by Stephen Westfall, EIDIA Books, editor and publisher, ISBN 0-9619021-1-6
- We Apologize (2004) designed by Charwei Tsai and Noel Acosta in collaboration with EIDIA, ISBN 0-9619021-4-0
- Paul Lamarre and Melissa Wolf, Domestic Bliss, Gallery LOK, NY, (exhibition catalogue) March 24-April 17, 1993

== Bibliography ==
- Timothy Greenfield Sanders, ""Cheap Eats", The Starving Artists' Cookbook", International EYE, (East Village Eye), December 1986.
- Tom Rubnitz, "Starving Artists' Cook", Paper, February 1987.
- Hal Rubenstein, "Cooking Artists" (review), Details, Suddenly This Section, August 1987, vol. 6, no. 2, p. 74; ill.
- Robert Mahoney, "Group U.F.O.", Arts Magazine, January 1988.
- Lisa Ravery, "The Starving Artists' Cookbook", SLEEK, no. 24, Eat / Feed, Berlin Winter 2009/2010, p. 34; ill.
- Silvia Fubini, ""Arte In Cucina", The Starving Artists' Cookbook", Per Lui magazine, July/August 1988, n.62.
- Steve Westfall, ""Palette-Pleasers", The Starving Artists' Cookbook", Equator magazine, 1988, n.4.
- Abby Robinson, "The Artist's Palate, "Starving Artists' Cookbook & Video"" New York Post, April 5, 1989, pp. 39, 43; ill.
- Luca Neri, ""Il Ricettario Dell'Artista. Affamato," Starving Artists' Cookbook", Lei magazine, April 1989, n.139, pp. 230–233; ill.
- Susanne Lingermann, "Spaghetti Mit Mayo und Prawda aus der Pfanne." ART Das Kunstmagazin, Panorama, July 7, 1989, DM 15.
- Judd Tully, "How Do You Like Those Eggs?", Taxi, "Art Speak" (review), August 1989, p. 22; ill.
- Robert Mahoney, "Quiet Desperation installations Revisited", Arts Magazine, November 1989, p. 59-61; ill.
- Richard Heller and Bennett Roberts, "New Fabricants", (exhibition catalogue) Richard/Bennett Gallery, Los Angeles, CA, June 8 – July 21 1990, pp. 23–24; ill.
- (no author) "The Starving Artists' Cookbook/ Video Series", Media Alliance, Media Matters, July/August 1991, vol.9, n.4.
- Hal Rubenstein, "Starving Artists' Cookbook, Trust Us - Rantings and Ravings", Mirabella magazine, August 1991, p. 172; ill.
- Robert Atkins, ""Starving Artists' Banquet," Food for Thought: Scene & Heard", Village Voice, April 1992, p. 100.
- Richard Johnson, "Anthony Haden-Guest performance for "Starving Artists' Cookbook"", New York Daily News, May 19, 1992, p. 6.
- (no author) ""News" the Starving Artists' Cookbook", Flash Art magazine, No.164, May /June 1992.
- Saul Ostrow, "10 Steps Store Show", (catalogue), Muranushi Lederman Productions, November/December 1992.
- Georgia Dullea, "at the Meals on Reels Film Festival, Chicken Soup and a Tasty Frenchman", New York Times, March 18, 1992.
- Dore Ashton, editor, with Komar & Melamid, "Monumental Propaganda" (group traveling exhibition wt. catalogue), Independent Curators International, New York, 1994, ISBN 0-916365-42-5.
- Kim Levin, "Private Dealer", The Village Voice, Art Galleries, April 18, 1995.
- Mel Chin, Ellen F. Salpeter, "Scratch" (exhibition catalogue), Thread Waxing Space, May 2, 1996.
- Max Alverez, "Creative Tools for the Culture Wars, 'the nea tapes' and Artistic Freedom Under Attack", The Independent Film & Video Monthly, August 1996, vol.19 n.7.
- Paul Lamarre and Melissa Wolf, "The nea papers ", Zingmagazine: A Curatorial Crossing, February 1997, no. 3.
- Geisel Sieglinde, "the nea tapes", Neue Zürcher Zeitung, May 1997.
- Andreas Bär, Susanne Rehm, "EIDIA House" (exhibition catalogue), Peripherie Gallery at Sudhaus, Tübingen, Germany, November 7–30, 1997 pp. 4–6; ill.
- Vezio Tomasinelli, Demetrio Paparoni, "VELAN III" (exhibition catalogue), VELAN Center for Contemporary, Turino Italy, June 8-July 19, 1997, pp. 34–35, 56; ill.
- Paul Lamarre and Melissa Wolf, "The Assassination of the NEA or the Following is Not Funded by the NEA", EXHIBITIONIST magazine, April/May 1997, issue 1, p. 17-19, 22; ill.
- Barbara Kirshenblatt-Gimblett, "Playing to the Senses: Food as a Performance Medium", Performance Research 4, Spring 1999, no. 1.
- Steven G. Kellman, "nea-saying on tape", San Antonio Current, November 11–17, 1999, no. 494.
- Ken Miller, "Witness For The Defense: "the nea tapes" (review), The Independent Film & Video Monthly, April 2000, vol. 23, no. 3, p. 12; ill.
- Richard Baimbridge, "From Cooking Lessons to Saving the nea at EIDIA House", (review) The Independent Film & Video Monthly, December 2001, p. 10; ill.
- Elizabeth Helfgott, ""Salad Days", The Starving Artists' Cookbook Video/Book" (review), ARTnews, May 2001, p. 44; ill.
- Reena Jena, "the nea tapes, The Movie", Artforum.com, May 22, 2001.
- G.Grippo and Cindy Hsiao, "Firstop" Williamsburg Design (catalogue), EIDIA House, New York, September 28/29, 2002.
- Mary Voelz Chandler, "For freedom of expression, there's always a war on", Rocky Mountain News, November 30, 2002.
- (no author) "the nea tapes" 'Pick of the Week', Xavier University, CityBeat, Cincinnati, OH, June 15, 2003.
- G.Grippo and Cindy Hsiao, "Firstop, Open Up" Williamsburg Design (catalogue), EIDIA House, New York, September 27/28, 2003.
- Susan DeMasi, "the nea tapes", Ammerman Campus Library, Suffolk County Community College, Selden, NY, University of Buffalo Libraries, Educational Media Reviews Online, 2003
- William Messer, "Cincinnati Freedom: Freely Assembled Expressions", Art Spike, May 2003.
- Gregory Flannery, "How Long Will the Morgue Photos Haunt Cincinnati?" CityBeat, Cincinnati, September 4, 2003.
- Jessica Winbaum, Behind The Red Tape, "the nea tapes", McGill University, McGill Daily, Montreal, Quebec, September 29, 2003, vol. 93, n.8.
- Blake Moore, Firststop, EIDIA House, Meet the Designers, Core77, September 27 & 28, 2003; ill.
- Richard C. Walls, "the nea tapes", Detroit Doc Film Festival, Metro Times, Detroit, November 7, 2004.
- Liberation Iannillo, "Wide Open", Trigger, July 16, 2005.
- Nicole J. Caruth, "Bourgeois the Artist, Bourgeois the Cook", Art21 Blog, June 18, 2010.
- Nicole J. Caruth, "With Food In Mind" (exhibition catalogue), The Center for Book Arts, New York, April 15 – June 25, 2011, pp. 22–23; ill.
- Ted Mineo, "EIDIA", Diner Journal magazine No.20, The Menu Issue, Brooklyn NY, winter 2012. pp. 19-27; Scarlett Lindeman,"Recipes Winter 2012" 35-36; ill.
- Allison C. Meier, "Exploring the Southern Edge of Bushwick Open Studios," Hyperallergic.com, "Street" (artblog/magazine), June 3, 2013.
- Katarina Hybenova, "Best Curated Shows" NoBSBOS Guide, Bushwick Daily, Arts and Culture, Brooklyn New York, May 31, 2013.
- Tom Howells, editor "Experimental Eating", November 2014, publisher, Black Dog Publishing, London, features FOOD SEX ART the Starving Artists' Cookbook with essay, ISBN 9781908966407
