= Michele Pred =

Swedish-American conceptual artist

- Born: San Francisco, California, United States
- Education: California College of the Arts
- Website: michelepred.com

Michele Pred (born 1966) is a Swedish-American conceptual artist whose practice includes sculpture, assemblage, and performance. Her work uncovers the cultural and political meaning behind everyday objects with a particular focus on themes like equal pay, reproductive rights, and personal security. Her projects also contain social components that drive the conversation into public spaces. Examples include her exploration of the intersection of personal space and security using airport confiscated items after 9/11, the cultural background of the fight for reproductive rights using thousands of expired birth control pills and the continuing economic and political struggle for women's rights represented by her modified vintage handbag editions.

== Biography ==
Pred was born in San Francisco. She grew up in Berkeley, where her father, Allan Pred was a professor of geography at the University of California, and in Stockholm. She attended California College of the Arts in Oakland in the 1990s and graduated with distinction in Interdisciplinary Arts.

== Career ==
Vote Feminist, Pred's fall 2018 solo show at Nancy Hoffman Gallery, foregrounded political issues of voting, pay inequity based on gender and race, and gun violence.

During Miami Art Week in November 2017, Pred organized a Parade Against Patriarchy. Pred curated artists to participate from all over the United States including Pussy Hat creator 'Krista Suh.

For "Equal Pay Day" on April 4, 2017, Pred handed out precisely cut dollar bills to "reflect the pay percentages paid to women based on their race." Pred performed her art work for an hour on Market street in San Francisco to spread word about the gender pay gap.

April 14, 2017 Amy Schumer included Pred's limited edition "Pro Choice" handbag in her "19 Things Amy Schumer Really Loves" interview with InStyle. Schumer also promoted the handbag on Instagram.

In October, 2016 Pred, dressed as a 1960s era stewardess handed out "Official Air Travel Replacement" pocket knives in the San Francisco International Airport's baggage terminal to commemorate the 15th anniversary of September 11 and the passage of the Patriot Act.

In 2016 Pred created a series of T-shirt designs promoting women's reproductive freedom. Her work is in the permanent collection at the 9/11 Memorial Museum in New York.

Pred created an art series as a response to Supreme Court decisions limiting access to abortion and contraceptives for women. In 2007 she created an exhibit featuring items confiscated at airports for security reasons.

Pred was an adjunct professor at California College of the Arts from 2007 to 2015.

== Collaborations & Public Projects ==
Pred is a member of For Freedoms, the first artist-run Super PAC founded by artists Eric Gottesman and Hank Willis Thomas. She has participated in several projects with the organization including an exhibition at Jack Shainman in New York, and her project #HerBodyHerVote at Expo Chicago, 2016, and an electronic billboard "My Body My Business" by the San Mateo Bridge in the San Francisco Bay Area.
