= Don Simmons (artist) =

Canadian experimental artist and writer (born 1973)

Don Simmons (Born 1973 in St. John's, Newfoundland) is a Canadian experimental artist and writer whose work materializes itself as robotics, electronics, audio, installation and performance.

Simmons' work addresses problematic concepts like the automation and the psychological effects of simulated processes. He often treats the body as a machine and tool for collecting data/information. Simmons will create situations for 'false' emotional states to occur in the audience, in turn questioning the reality of simulated emotions. His work has also dealt with scatological, littoral, and tactical art practices. He also exhibits collaboratively as the Tactical Art Coalition, EMMAX and the Work group.

Simmons has participated in exhibitions internationally, including exhibitions at the Walter Phillips Gallery, Banff, curated by Jim Drobnick, the College for Creative Studies, Detroit, curated by Melanie Manos, Video In Studios, Vancouver, as a part of the Signal & Noise Festival, and at EMMEDIA, Calgary. His performative installation called 'One Month' at the Truck Gallery, Calgary, involved several clown/drag queen hybrids performing during gallery hours. The clown/drag queen hybrids would wander the gallery in depressed mood avoiding the gallery's visitors.

Other past exhibitions have included Western Front, Vancouver, curated Victoria Singh & Velveeta Krisp for That 70's Ho Performance Series, Galerie SAW Gallery, Ottawa, curated by Jason & Stefan St-Laurent for SCATALOGUE: 30 Years of Crap in Contemporary Art with Mikiki, Southern Alberta Art Gallery, Lethbridge, curated by David Diviney, Eastern Edge Gallery, St. John's, NL, Anna Leonowens Gallery, Halifax, Trinity Square Video, Toronto, The Music Gallery, Toronto.

Simmons has released three audio art CDs called "Don Simmons vs. Marcel duChamp", "Beautiful Losers", "birthday song - EMMAX (Ken Buera & Don Simmons)".

Simmons has been on faculty at the Alberta College of Art and Design in their Media Arts and Digital Technologies Department. His critical writing has been published internationally in publications such as: Parachute, Image and Text, and Handheld Media.
