= The League of Imaginary Scientists =

American art group

The League of Imaginary Scientists is an art organization founded in 2006 and located in Los Angeles, specializing in pataphysics, interactive art, and art/science collaborations.

== History ==
The League of Imaginary Scientists was founded in 2006, in Los Angeles, California. It has created artwork for many venues, including the Museum of Contemporary Art, Los Angeles, The Museum of Contemporary Art, Copenhagen and the California Institute of the Arts. They were the recipients of the Apexart residency in 2009, and the FUSE grant for development of site-specific art.

The principal members are:

- Dr. Hernandez-Gomez (Lucy Hernandez-Gomez, also known as Lucy H.G., or Lucy H.G. Solomon)
- Dr. Stephan Schleidan (Steve Shoffner)
- Prof. William T. Madmann (Jeremy Speed Schwartz)
- Prof. J. Johansen (Matt Solomon)
- Prof. Troubadour (Leonard Trubia)
