= Charles Moore (photographer) =

American photographer (1931–2010)

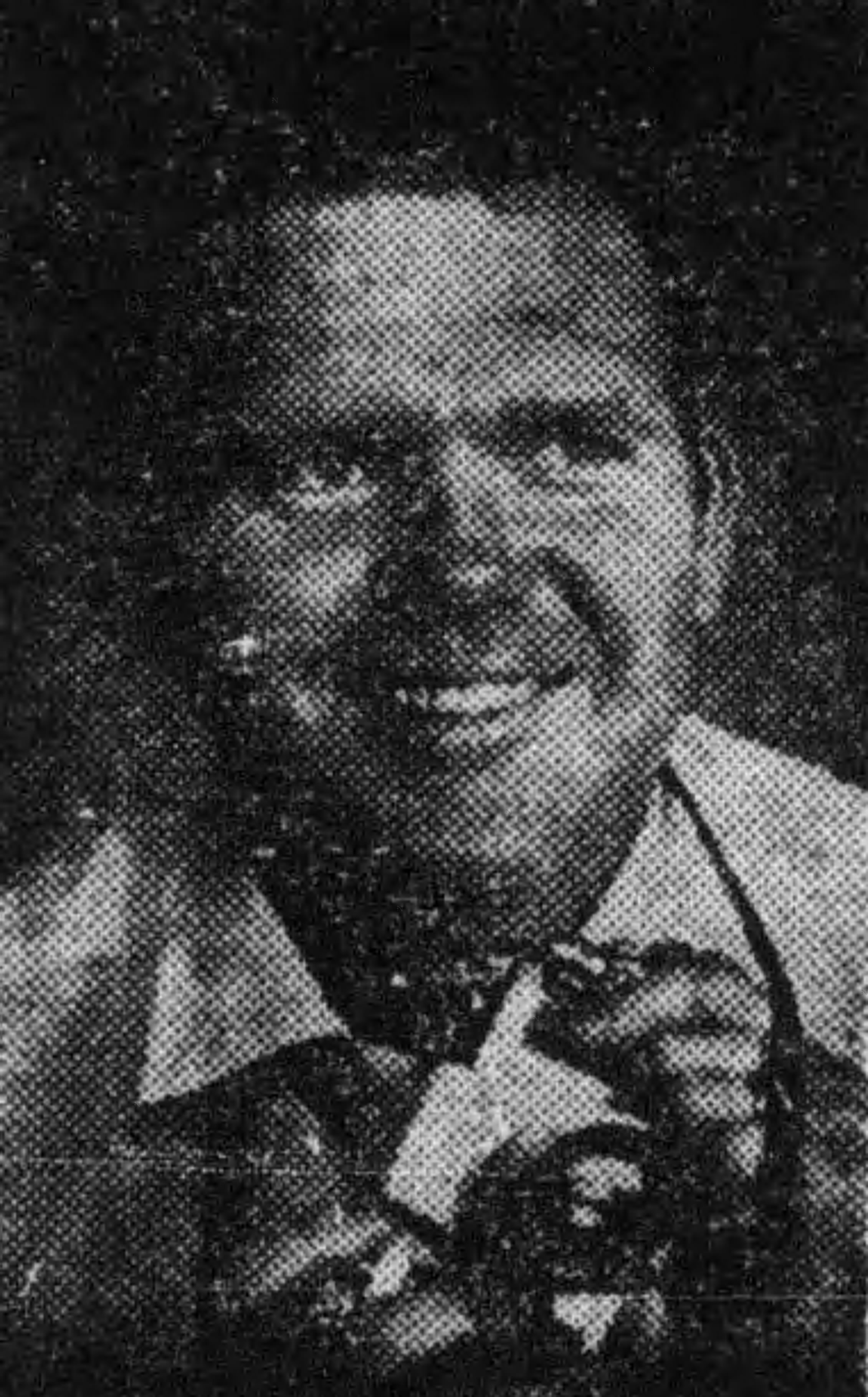
- Moore c. 1959
- Born: March 9, 1931; Hackleburg, Alabama
- Died: March 11, 2010 (aged 79); Palm Beach Gardens, Florida
- Occupation: Photographer
- Known for: photographs documenting the Civil Rights Movement

Charles Lee Moore (March 9, 1931 – March 11, 2010) was an American photographer known for his photographs documenting the Civil Rights Movement. Probably his most famous photo is of Martin Luther King Jr.'s arrest for loitering on September 3, 1958. It is this photo that sparked Moore's involvement in the Civil Rights Movement.

== Early life and education ==
Moore was born in 1931 in Hackleburg, Alabama. His father was a baptist minister. His mother died young. He has a younger brother, Jim, b. March 1936 d. October 2025. After attending local schools, he served three years in the U.S. Marines as a photographer.

Afterward he used the GI Bill to study at the Brooks Institute of Photography in Santa Barbara, California. He returned to Alabama, finding work as a photographer with the jointly owned morning and afternoon newspapers, Montgomery Advertiser and Alabama Journal.

== Career ==
In 1958, while working in Montgomery, Alabama, for the Montgomery Advertiser, he photographed an argument between the minister Martin Luther King Jr. and two policemen in Montgomery. His photographs were distributed nationally by the Associated Press, and published in Life.

From this start, Moore traveled throughout the South documenting the activities of the Civil Rights Movement. One of his most well-known photographs Birmingham, depicts demonstrators being attacked by firemen wielding high-pressure hoses. U.S. Senator Jacob Javits, said that Moore's pictures "helped to spur passage of the Civil Rights Act of 1964."

In 1962, Moore left the newspapers to start a freelance career. He worked for the Black Star picture agency, which sold much of his work to Life magazine.

Moore covered the Vietnam War and conflicts in Dominican Republic, Venezuela and Haiti. He left warfare to work in nature, fashion and travel photography, in addition to corporate work.

In 1989, Moore was the first recipient of the Eastman Kodak Crystal Eagle Award for Impact in Photojournalism, which is awarded for a "body of photographic work which has influenced public perceptions on important issues of our time," in the NPPA–University of Missouri Pictures of the Year International Competition.

In 2008, Moore's last photographs were of the removal of a tree at Barton Hall, a historic 1840s plantation home in northern Alabama.

== Involvement in the Civil Rights Movement ==
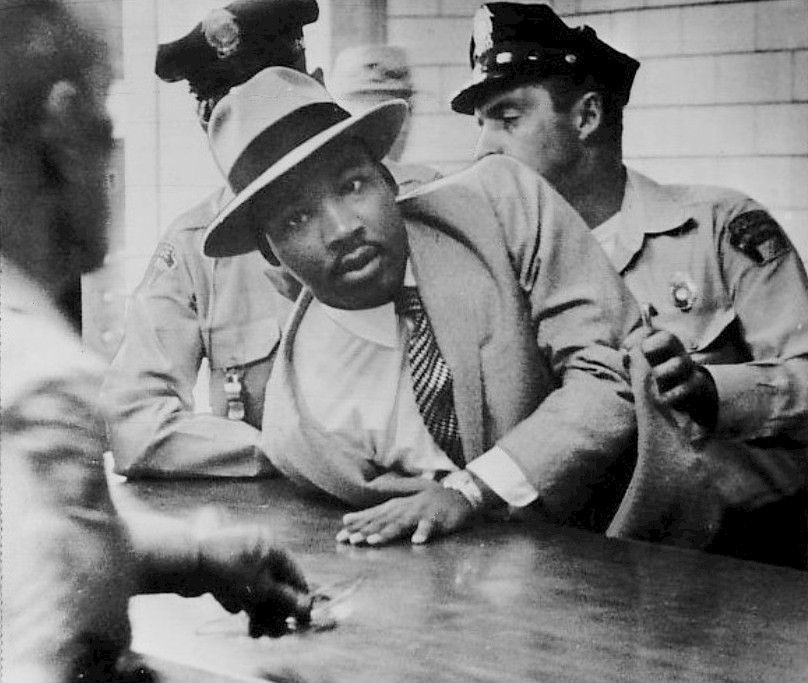
Photo of Martin Luther King Jr. being arrested for loitering while present at a colleague's court case.

On the day of September 3, 1958, Charles Moore was photographing a court case involving Ralph Abernathy for the Montgomery Advertiser when Moore witnessed two policemen attempting to arrest Dr. Martin Luther King Jr. for loitering at the crowded courthouse. Moore then followed as the two policemen took King to the police headquarters where he was charged and jailed for loitering. Moore had been the only photographer present, only because he was working to document Abernathy's case, and so his photo of King's arrest is the only one available. Life Magazine then picked up this photo and published it along with a collection of Moore's work over the next few years.

Charles Moore in 1962, now working for Life, heard of James Meredith's attempts to enroll at the segregated University of Mississippi, and went with a few other photographers to document the events. When he arrived two days before Meredith would be escorted to the campus, however, "[a] pack of enraged white students shoved their way into Moore's hotel room, shouting and cursing. One began to choke him before the former Golden Gloves boxer pushed him away". The day of Meredith's arrival, Moore attempted to begin photographing the mob, but he was readily identified as a photographer and the mob threatened him again. Knowing he would need to get through the mob without being recognized, he bought a gas mask, and sneaked onto the campus with a student—his camera was hidden in the trunk of the car where the police did not check before they were allowed on campus. Due to the mob's attempts to keep the riot undocumented, Moore's photos are the only photos of the riot.

May 2, 1963, was Phase III—"D-Day"—of "Project C" when more than a thousand children stayed out of school to march in Birmingham. Moore arrived in Birmingham on the 3rd when he heard reports of attacks on the demonstrators, and he immediately began documenting the events of the march. Some of the photos show the Birmingham Fire Department spraying the demonstrators with their pressure-hoses. Others show the policemen releasing their dogs on the demonstrators, tearing and ripping the clothes of the men, women, and children. These photos are shown in Life Magazine and "Birmingham stayed on the front pages of the Times and the Post for twelve days". One month later, when Alabama's Governor Wallace went to the University of Alabama campus to bar black students from registering, President Kennedy addressed Wallace's actions as well as the events in Birmingham, saying, "The events in Birmingham and elsewhere have so increased the cries for equality that no city or State or legislative body can prudently choose to ignore them". These photos even gained international attention with "[p]hotographs appear[ing] in newspapers throughout the world and the...story...told in many languages."

After witnessing demonstrators being beaten in the Selma marches, Moore needed to take a break from documenting the movement; "I had been involved in so much ugliness and I realized that I needed to do something else". When Moore was in California, "doing a sex education assignment for the Saturday Evening Post", he heard news of the assassination of Martin Luther King Jr. This was the end of Moore's work in the movement, and he would not be recognized for his position in the movement until twenty years later. His work was entered in the first annual Kodak Crystal Eagle Award, and he won, sparking a renewed interest in his work.

== Death ==
Moore died at age 79 of complications related to Alzheimer's disease on March 11, 2010, in Palm Beach Gardens, Florida.

== Publications ==
- Powerful Days: The Civil Rights Photography of Charles Moore. Tuscaloosa, AL: University of Alabama Press, 2001. ISBN 978-0-8173-1152-0.
- The Motherlode. San Francisco: Chronicle, 2006.

== Films ==
- I Fight With My Camera (2005) – video

== See also ==
- List of photographers of the civil rights movement
- Race Riot painting by Andy Warhol
