= Bruce Barber =

Canadian-New Zealand artist, writer, curator

Bruce Barber (born 1950 in New Zealand) is an artist, writer, curator, and educator based in Halifax, Nova Scotia, where he teaches at NSCAD University. His artwork has been shown at the Paris Biennale, the Sydney Biennial, the New Museum of Contemporary Art, the Walter Phillips Gallery, London Regional Gallery, and Artspace NZ in Auckland. Barber is the editor of Essays on Performance and Cultural Politicization and of Conceptual Art: the NSCAD Connection 1967–1973. He is co-editor, with Serge Guilbaut and John O'Brian of Voices of Fire: Art Rage, Power, and the State. His critical essays have appeared in numerous anthologies, journals and magazines. His art practice is documented in the publication Reading Rooms. He is best known for his early performance work, his Reading Rooms, Squat Projects and his writing and theory on Littoral Art.

== Reading Rooms ==
In his Reading Rooms, Barber worked with Alexander Rodchenko's 1925 Reading Room as a model for a workers' library and study. These multi-part installations made use of multi-media formats to re-present various forms of corporate advertising and news reporting. The Red Room addressed the construction of masculinity through media representation. The imagery used for critical readings was obtained from various sites of popular culture including film, advertising, war history, weapons magazines and comic books. The Newsroom section contained newspaper accounts of male violence; the Viewsroom contained slide projections; the Videoroom contained video footage of x-rated films and a Marvin cartoon satirising male parenting behaviour; the Theory/Criticism Room provided tools with which readers could alter a selection of magazines. A theoretical essay titled "Excision, Detournement and Reading the Open Text" elaborated the process they would have then been using. Among some of the aphorisms contained in this essay are the following:

3) The excision is less a surgical operation than a cognitive procedure, opening up the possibilities for renegotiating the areas of signification both within and beyond the image or text. Excising elements from the image confirms the existence of a primary context, pretexts and within the image itself, subtexts which disclose the competing economies of the sign(s).

9) Warning: Excision should not become the servant of censorship.

25) Close reading has never been a good substitute for criticism.

29) Absence only becomes a problem where power is concerned. Absence is difference (Jacques Derrida). Open reading allows readers to acknowledge the provisionality of meaning. Power and political efficacy is a function of use. In this context history may represent change yet remain the same.

30) The open reader accepts his/her status as a political subject with all this may imply.

38) Open reading may assist the promotion of critical education.

39) Critical education may become education for criticism.

== Operative art ==
In a number of texts, beginning in the early 1980s, Barber has considered the potential for performance work to avoid its ossification into a genre category. Clearly, the type of conceptual performance art that was common in the late sixties and early seventies had run its course. While emerging forms of postmodern performance were appropriating mainstream forms of entertainment, their critical function was often weakened or altogether abandoned. Performance could possibly withstand becoming affirmative culture (Herbert Marcuse) by rediscovering its sources in avant-garde theatre. Bertolt Brecht, for instance, echoed Karl Marx's critique of philosophy when he wrote: "The theatre became an affair for philosophers, but only for those philosophers as wished not just to explain the world, but also to change it." Brecht coined the term umfunctionierung (functional transformation) to enable theatre to become an instrument to serve the interests of class struggle. And in his famous essay, "The Author as Producer," Walter Benjamin extolled the virtues of the "operative" artist, providing as his example the communist author Sergei Tretyakov, who thought of his work not merely as descriptive reporting on reality, but an active intervention. Benjamin believed that cultural practice should refuse modish commerce and should give work a revolutionary use value. This meant the avoidance of the impulse to aestheticize and the ordination of critical agency as a post-aesthetic strategy, one that can contain values that are nominally subsumed under several progressive political/aesthetic ideologies. In an implicit effort to politicize advanced forms of performance, Barber placed the term performance under erasure with the formulation of [performance].

Since the publication of "Towards and Adequate Interventionist [Performance] Practice" (1985), Barber has explored the radical potential of performance. The table of binary oppositions below represents general differences between two types of political action, configured as acts of protest or resistance. Depending on the circumstances and the type of event, intervention can become an exemplary action, and thus devolve into a form of political posturing, closely implicated in extreme versions of behaviour characterized by violence, anarchic rejection or destructive nihilism. While exemplary actions are usually without theoretical support, interventions attempt to put theory into action. The intentions and ultimately the audience response are different. The exemplary action consists, instead of intervening in an overall way, in acting in a much more concentrated way on exemplary objectives, on a few key objectives that will play a determining role in the continuation of the struggle.

EXEMPLARY / STRATEGIC ACTION : ANARCHIC / INDIVIDUALISTIC ACTION	INTERVENTION / INSTRUMENTAL ACTION : COLLABORATIVE OR PARTICIPATORY
spontaneous	planned
dynamic / direct / focussed action	exhibits less dynamism / indirect
absence of theory	theory laden / movement toward praxis
induces repression / confrontation	integrative / mediative / interruptive / provocative
cathartic / provocative / dialectical	non-cathartic / attempts to lessen provocation / encourages dialogue
theatrical / spectacular	performative / non-spectacular

Among the artists that Barber has recognized for their contributions to [performance] practice - Martha Rosler, Adrian Piper, Guerrilla Art Action Group, Critical Art Ensemble and WochenKlausur, among others - he gave a privileged role to the Situationist International as an exemplary model of operative art. The SI and the students they influenced participated in occupations, sit-ins, teach-ins, theatrical agit-prop events and other forms of protest. The SI endorsed the fundamental importance of intervention as a post-theoretical and practical aspect of their critique of the "Society of the Spectacle" - as theorized by Guy Debord. Among the theoretically informed strategies that were developed by the SI is the constructed situation. The constructed situation is bound to be collective both in its inception and development. However, it seems that at least during an initial experimental period, responsibility must fall on one particular individual. This individual must, so to speak, be the 'director' of the situation. For example, in terms of one particular situationist project - revolving around the meeting of several friends one evening - one would expect (a) an initial period of research by the team, (b) the election of a director responsible for co-ordinating the basic elements for the construction of the decor, and for working out a number of interventions, (c) the actual people living the situation who have taken part in the whole project both theoretically and practically, and (d) a few passive spectators not knowing what the hell is going on should be reduced to action.

== Communicative action and littoral art ==
According to Barber, communicative action is very different from direct action or intervention, although it may seem to employ some of the characteristics of both. Jürgen Habermas, who has arguably done more than anyone else to theorize various forms of political action within the public sphere, distinguishes between strategic, instrumental and communicative actions. The distinction, he argues, between actions that are oriented toward success and those toward understanding is crucial. In strategic actions one actor seeks to influence the behavior of another by means of the threat of sanctions or the prospect of gratification in order to cause the interaction to continue as the first actor desires. Whereas in a communicative action one actor seeks rationally to motivate another by relying on the illocutionary binding/bonding effect of the offer contained in the speech act (J.L. Austin). Donative and Littoral art practices work in a way that challenges the strategies of the postmodern era: taking, quoting, and appropriating.

In a number of essays on "littoral art," Barber has emphasized donative art practices as examples of communicative action. Donative art actions insist that giving can be used strategically to further a number of identifiable lifeworld and humanitarian goals, as well as provide some critical intervention into the ideological fabric of our culture. While donative practices may activate a cycle of reciprocity, gifts may remain unreciprocated. Each cultural intervention, exemplary or not, engages a "logic of practice" (Pierre Bourdieu) that encourages an infinite variety of exchanges or gifts, challenges, ripostes, reciprocations, and repressions. The logic of practice privileges agency in its unpredictability and provides, according to Habermas, an alternative to money and power as a basis for societal integration. Among the artists engaged in donative art practices and who are mentioned in Barber's writings are: Istvan Kantor, David Mealing, Yin Xiaofeng, REPOhistory, Kelly Lycan & Free Food, Bloom 98, WochenKlausur, Ala Plastica, Peter Dunn & Lorraine Leeson, Art Link, Hirsch Farm Project.
