= Agustina Woodgate =

Argentine artist (born 1981)

Agustina Woodgate (born February 27, 1981) is an Argentine visual artist who lives and works between Amsterdam and Buenos Aires.

== Early life and education ==
Woodgate was born in 1981 in Buenos Aires, Argentina. As a child, Woodgate spent weekends illustrating comic books and building experiments with her brother. Woodgate reported being "an avid collector of crap and nonsense things, like the cigarette boxes of different brands, erasers with different shapes, stickers, letter papers, bottle caps, stones, coins."

She received her Bachelor of Fine Arts from the Instituto Universito Nacional de Arte, Buenos Aires in 2004. Shortly after, Woodgate moved to Miami, where she gained recognition for clandestinely sewing labels inscribed with poetry into clothing at thrift stores, a project that Woodgate described as "poetry bombing."

== Career and exhibitions ==
Woodgate works in a variety of forms, including radio, public art, and sculpture. Woodgate's solo projects include New Landscapes, Art Positions, Art Basel Miami Beach (2012), Collectivism, Spinello Projects, Miami (2011); Growing Up, Miami-Dade Public Library (2010); Endlessly Falling, Dimensions Variable, Miami (2009) and Radio Espacio Estacion, an "ongoing online nomadic bilingual radio station."

Woodgate's public projects include I. Stanley Levine Memorial Bench, commissioned by the Art in Public Places committee of Miami Beach (2013), Hopscotch, commissioned by the Bass Museum, Miami (2013), Kulturpark, an initiative set in an abandoned amusement park in East Berlin (2012), 1111, Highway Billboards & Bus Shelter Posters, Commissioned by Locust Projects (2011), and Concrete Poetry, a permanent urban design project as a part of the Miami Poetry Festival in collaboration with O, Miami and Miami-Dade County's Department of Transportation and Public Works (2018).

Woodgate has been a part of many group exhibitions, including the Denver Art Museum (2013), KW Institute for Contemporary Art, Berlin (2012); White Box, NY (2012); Gallery Nosco, London (2011); Good Children Gallery, New Orleans (2011); Naples Museum of Art, FL (2011); North Carolina Museum (2011); Montreal Biennale, Canada (2009) and Museum of Contemporary Art, Miami (2007).

Her work is included in the permanent collection of the Denver Art Museum, the Pérez Art Museum Miami, Florida; and the Peabody Essex Museum, Massachusetts.

=== Whitney Biennial 2019 ===
Woodgate was on the official artist list for the Whitney Biennial 2019. However, she was later one of the eight artists who asked the Whitney Museum of American Art to remove their works from the Biennial, "citing what they describe as the museum’s lack of response to calls for the resignation of a board member with ties to the sale of military supplies, including tear gas." Woodgate and fellow artist Eddie Arroyo announced through Spinello Projects that “the request is intended as condemnation of Warren Kanders' continued presence as Vice Chair of the Board and the Museum's continued failure to respond in any meaningful way to growing pressure from artists and activists.” Her work National Times (2016) remained available for viewing during the Whitney Biennial 2019.

== Works ==
National Times (2016) was featured in the Whitney Biennial 2019. The piece involves is a display of 40 clocks, spanning all three walls of the room, interconnected by a network of tubing, and synchronized by the atomic clock at the National Institute of Standards and Technology. The hands of each clock were wrapped in sandpaper, so that as they rotate around the face of the clock, the numerals are gradually etched away.

In 2021 Woodgate exhibited her Art Dealing Machine (ADM) at the Frieze at the Shed in New York. The ADM is a modified Automated Teller Machine (ATM) that dispenses Woodgate's art. Meant to replace the function of an art dealer, collectors purchase art directly from the machine with a debit card.
