= Sasha Lilley =

English-born American radio host

Sasha Lilley (born 1975) is an English-born radio host, writer, editor and journalist based in Oakland, California. She is co-founder and host of the Pacifica Radio programme Against the Grain and has written and edited books on political economy and social movements.

== Career ==
Lilley is the editor of Capital and Its Discontents: Conversations with Radical Thinkers in a Time of Tumult, published by PM Press. Lilley is a contributor to the Turbulence Collective's What Would it Mean to Win?, a collection of debates about the direction of the Global Justice Movement, published by PM Press. She is the series editor of the political economy imprint Spectre.

Lilley is a co-founder and host of the Pacifica Radio program Against the Grain. From 2007 to 2009, she was the interim program director at KPFA. She directed Pacifica Radio's coverage of the Winter Soldier hearings in Silver Spring, Maryland, launched the War Comes Home, about the human costs of the Iraq and Afghanistan occupations, curated the multimedia project “1968: The Year that Shook the World” commemorating 1968 with archival audio from the Pacifica Radio Archives, and launched the multimedia collaboration “Afghanistan 2008: Seven Years After the Taliban”.

She has overseen national broadcasts, including on torture under the George W. Bush administration, the testimonials of survivors of Hurricane Katrina, and on the 2008 financial crisis.

Lilley was an editor, staff writer, and researcher at CorpWatch, reporting on the World Bank, labor struggles, and agribusiness.

She has worked as an academic researcher and investigative journalist, including into US contracts in Iraq following the American-led invasion.

== Personal life ==
Lilley is married to PM Press and AK Press founder Ramsey Kanaan.

== Books ==
- Capital and Its Discontents: Conversations with Radical Thinkers in a Time of Tumult (2011)
- What Would It Mean to Win? (editor, 2010)
- Catastrophism: The Apocalyptic Politics of Collapse and Rebirth (2012)

== Other works ==
- Lilley, Sasha. Theory and Practice: Conversations with Noam Chomsky and Howard Zinn (DVD) PM Press, 2010.
