= Littoral art =

Littoral art is a term used by Canadian artist and writer Bruce Barber to describe art occurring outside of the institutions of the artworld. It is a manifestation of Nicolas Bourriaud's relational aesthetics and is public and community-based, emphasizing the interaction between artists and spectators. The idea derives from Habermas's concept of communicative action.
