= Bob Witz =

American artist and writer (1934–2021)

Robert A. Witz (September 9, 1934 – February 23, 2021) was an American artist, poet and writer. He was born in Tomah, Wisconsin and graduated from the University of Wisconsin in 1959. He was founder and editor of the literary arts magazine, APPEARANCES.

Some of his correspondences with Artforum magazine were published by editor Robert Pincus-Witten along with his work "The Work Ethic a Drawing" under the title.

Witz died in Tomah on February 23, 2021, at the age of 86.
