= Jeff Brouws =

American photographer

- Born: 1955 (age 70–71); San Francisco, California
- Occupation: Photographer
- Website: www.jeffbrouws.com

Jeff Brouws (born 1955) is a documentary photographer who resides in Upstate New York.

== Early life ==
Brouws was born in San Francisco, California.

== Photography ==
Brouws, using myriad photographic approaches—from narrative stand-alone images to groupings of typologies—has spent the last 27 years visually exploring the American cultural landscape from a historical and socio-economic perspective. His subject matter includes: nuclear weapons and their past and present legacy, vernacular roadside architecture, the franchised landscape of big box stores and strip malls, suburbia, inner city environments, de-industrialized / post industrial cities of the northeast, and the contemporary and historical railroad landscape. With an affinity for what cultural geographers classify as TOADS (temporary, obsolete, derelict, abandoned sites) Brouws's practice involves what he refers to as "visual anthropology." Initially inspired by New Topographic photographers like Robert Adams, Joe Deal and Lewis Baltz, he also counts the photography of Walker Evans, Camillo Jose Vergara, Bernd and Hilla Becher, Ed Ruscha, Mark Ruwedel, and Allan Sekula as important touchstones.

Since the early 1990s his work has also been intellectually informed by the writings of cultural geographers, historians and social critics like J.B. Jackson, John Stilgoe, Dolores Hayden, Leo Marx and Mike Davis. These writers provided for Brouws "a conversion experience to a new way at looking at the built environment.”

== Publications ==
In 1992 Brouws self-published a book homage to the artist Ed Ruscha entitled Twentysix Abandoned Gasoline Stations, referencing Ruscha's Twentysix Gasoline Stations (1963).

He has had several other books published of his own work including Highway: America's Endless Dream (1997); Inside The Live Reptile Tent: The Twilight World of the Carnival Midway (2001); Readymades: American Roadside Artifacts (2003); and Approaching Nowhere (2006). He is also the editor and co-author (with Hermann Zschiegner, Wendy Burton, Phil Taylor and Mark Rawlinson) of Various Small Books: Referencing the Various Small Books of Ed Ruscha (2013).

In additional he has authored or co-authored four books on railroad photography featuring the work of other artists. These titles include: Starlight On The Rails, Harry Abrams, 1999; A Passion for Trains: The Railroad Photography of Richard Steinheimer, W. W. Norton, 2004; The Call of Trains: Railroad Photographs by Jim Shaughnessy, W. W. Norton, 2008; and Some Vernacular Railroad Photographs, W. W. Norton, 2013.

His work has also appeared in Harper’s, The New Yorker, and The New York Times Magazine.

He has lectured as a visiting artist at: Syracuse University, Texas State University, School of Visual Arts, Kenyon College, St. John Fischer College, Williams College, San Jose State, the Museum of Photographic Arts, and Vassar College.

== Exhibitions ==
His work has been included in over 25 solo exhibitions and a similar number of group shows including two iterations of Ed Ruscha: Books & Co., which appeared at the Gagosian Gallery, New York City and the Brandhorst Museum Munich, in 2013.

- Approaching Nowhere, Robert Koch Gallery, San Francisco, CA, 2006. (solo)
- Typologies, Yancey Richardson, New York, NY, 2011. (solo)
- Typologies, Projects & Portfolios 1991-2016, Robert Mann Gallery, New York, NY, 2016. (solo)

== Collections ==
Brouws' work can be found in numerous public collections including: The Whitney Museum of American Art, The Cleveland Museum of Art, The Fogg Museum, Princeton University Art Museum, the Henry Art Museum, the San Francisco Museum of Modern Art, the Los Angeles County Museum of Art and the J. Paul Getty Museum (9 prints, as of September 2019).

== Awards ==
Brouws is the recipient of two awards from the Railway and Locomotive Historical Society: the George and Constance Hilton Book Award given for A Passion for Trains: The Railroad Photography of Richard Steinheimer in 2005; and the John H. White Fellowship for research on southern railroad photography in 2013.

== Books ==
- Highway: America's Endless Dream. Stewart, Tabori and Chang, 1997.
- Inside The Live Reptile Tent: The Twilight World of the Carnival Midway. Chronicle, 2001. With a text by Bruce Caron.
- Readymades. Chronicle Books, 2003.
- Approaching Nowhere. W. W. Norton, 2006. With a text by William Fox.
- Twentysix Abandoned Gasoline Stations.
- Some Vernacular Railroad Photographs.
- Various Small Books: Referencing Various Small Books by Ed Ruscha. MIT Press, 2013. Edited and co-authored with Hermann Zschiegner, Wendy Burton, Phil Taylor and Mark Rawlinson.
