= T. J. Clark (art historian) =

British art historian and writer

- Born: Timothy James Clark; 12 April 1943 (age 83); Bristol, England
- Occupations: Art historian, writer
- Spouse: Anne Wagner
- Writing career
- Language: English
- Notable works: The Painting of Modern Life: Paris in the Art of Manet and his Followers

Timothy James Clark (born 12 April 1943) is a British art historian and writer. He taught art history in a number of universities in England and the United States, including Harvard and the University of California, Berkeley.

Clark has been influential in developing the field of art history, examining modern paintings as an articulation of the social and political conditions of modern life. His orientation is distinctly leftist, and he has often referred to himself as a Marxist.

== Life and work ==
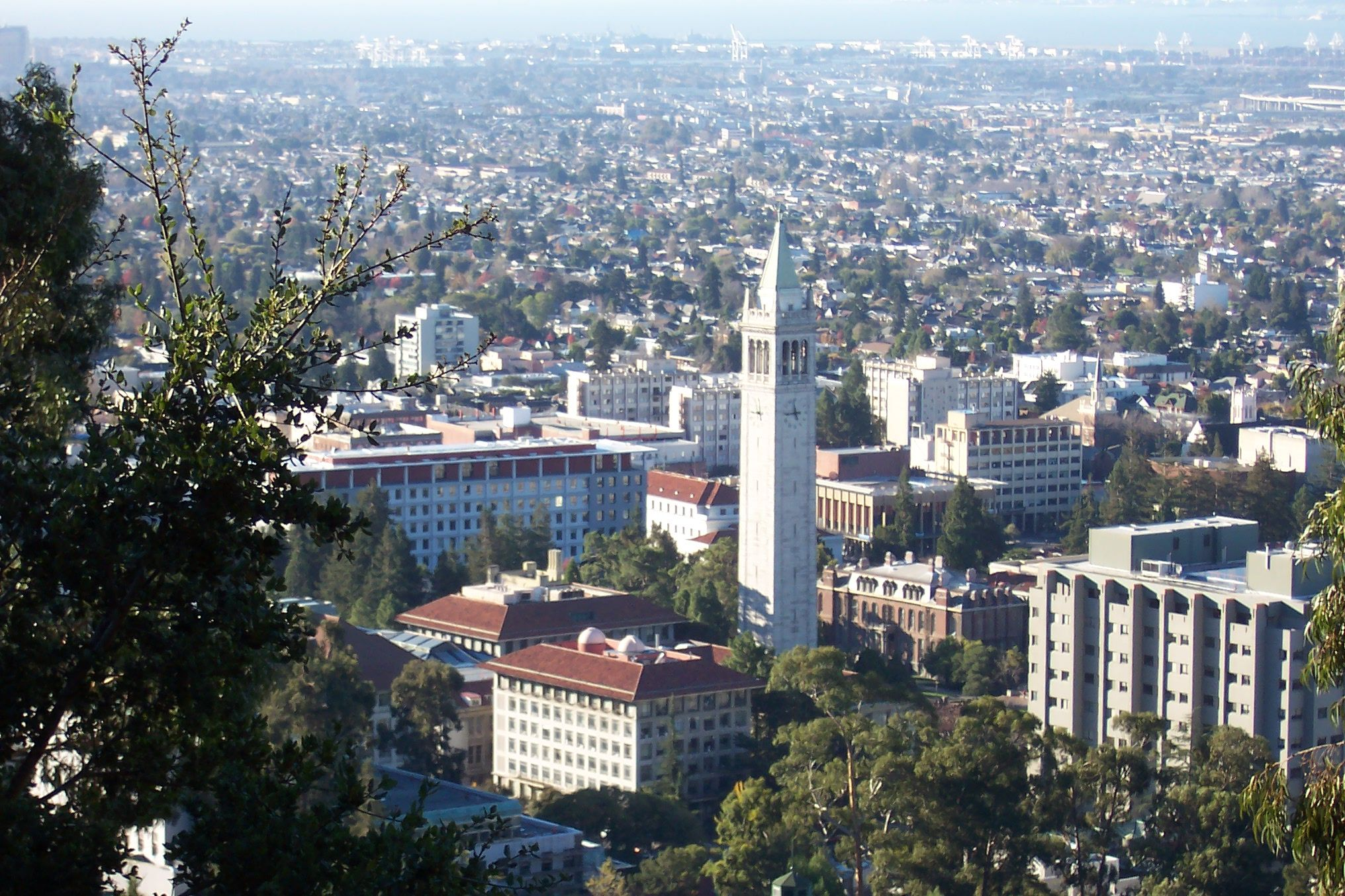
University of California, Berkeley, where Clark was a professor until his retirement in 2010

Clark attended Bristol Grammar School. He completed his undergraduate studies at St John's College, Cambridge, obtaining a first-class honours degree in 1964. He received his PhD in art history from the Courtauld Institute of Art, University of London in 1973. He lectured at the University of Essex 1967–69 and then at Camberwell College of Arts as a senior lecturer, 1970–74.

During this time he was also a member of the British Section of the Situationist International, from which he was expelled along with the other members of the English section. He was also involved in the group King Mob.

In 1973 he published two books based on his PhD dissertation: The Absolute Bourgeois: Artists and Politics in France, 1848–1851 and Image of the People: Gustave Courbet and the Second French Republic, 1848–1851. He taught at the University of California, Los Angeles in 1974–76. In 1976, he became a founding member of the Caucus for Marxism and Art of the College Art Association.

Clark returned to Britain in 1976 when he was appointed professor and head of the Department of Fine Art at the University of Leeds. In 1980 Clark joined the Department of Fine Arts at Harvard University, which angered some of the more conservative, connoisseurship-oriented faculty members, especially the Renaissance art historian Sydney Freedberg, with whom he had a public feud.

In 1982 he published an essay, "Clement Greenberg's Theory of Art", critical of prevailing Modernist theory, which prompted a notable and pointed exchange with Michael Fried. This exchange contributed to the debate between formalist and social histories of art.

Clark's works have taken art history in a new direction, away from traditional preoccupations with style and iconography. His books regard modern paintings as expressions of sociopolitical conditions in modern life.

In 1988 he joined the faculty at the University of California, Berkeley, where he held the George C. and Helen N. Pardee Chair as Professor of Modern Art until his retirement.

In 1991 Clark was awarded the College Art Association's Distinguished Teaching of Art History Award. Notable students include Thomas E. Crow, Michael Kimmelman, John O'Brian and Jonathan Weinberg.

As a member of Retort, a Bay Area-based collective of radical intellectuals, he co-authored the book Afflicted Powers: Capital and Spectacle in a New Age of War, published by Verso Books in 2005.

In 2005 Clark received a Mellon Foundation Distinguished Achievement Award. In 2006 he received an honorary degree from the Courtauld Institute of Art. In 2007, he was elected to the American Philosophical Society. He and his wife Anne Wagner, who also taught art history at Berkeley, retired in 2010 and moved to London. He continues to be active as a guest lecturer, author, and now as a poet. His book Picasso and Truth: From Cubism to Guernica is based on his Mellon Lectures in Fine Art delivered in spring 2009. His most recent book is If These Apples Should Fall: Cézanne and the Present (2022).

In 2020, he delivered the Gifford Lectures on Heaven on Earth: Painting and the Life to Come at the University of Glasgow.

== Critique of Clark ==
In "World Upside Down," Belgian social theorist Daniel Zamora critiques Clark's late affirmation of Cold War liberal interpretive politics in his 2024 collection On Breugel. Clark in his 80s maintains the fatalistic Counter-Enlightenment postwar consensus that bridged emancipatory liberalism and socialism back to Antienlightenment inequality, proscribing democratic progress to most nations. Clark thus interprets the sixteenth-century work of Bruegel as prefiguring the Cold War romantic virtue of "no future" leftists confined to mocking the left's past progressive Enlightenment pretenses, and to immediate survival, thereby constraining their attentions to the tasks of day to day life. Zamora suggests rather that Breugel rejected psychologism and that his work does not invite alienation, condescension, and dissolution into pure culture, which Zamora identifies as preoccupations of the Austro-Hungarian emigre left.

== Publications ==
- Image of the People: Gustave Courbet and the 1848 Revolution. Berkeley: University of California Press, 1973. ISBN 0-520-21745-4, trad Fr. :Image du peuple: Gustave Courbet et la révolution de 1848, Les Presses du Réel, 2007. ISBN 2-84066-214-0
- The Absolute Bourgeois: Artists and Politics in France, 1848–1851. Berkeley: University of California Press, 1973. ISBN 0-520-21744-6. trad Fr. :Le Bourgeois Absolu – Les Artistes Et La Politique En France De 1848 À 1851, Art édition, 1992. ISBN 978-2-905986-10-8, (projet) Presses du réel, ISBN 978-2-84066-215-0.
- The Painting of Modern Life: Paris in the Art of Manet and his Followers. Princeton, NJ: Princeton University Press, 1985. ISBN 0-691-00903-1
- T. J. Clark and Donald Nicholson-Smith (Winter 1997). "Why Art Can't Kill the Situationist International". October. 79: 15–31. JSTOR 778836. Also published at pp. 467–488 of book Tom McDonough (2004) (Editor) Guy Debord and the Situationist International: Texts and Documents. The MIT Press (1 April 2004) 514 pages ISBN 0-262-63300-0 ISBN 978-0262633000, trad. Fr. :Pourquoi l'art ne peut pas tuer l'internationale situationniste, Egrégores, 2006, ISBN 2-9523819-3-3
- Farewell to an Idea: Episodes from a History of Modernism. New Haven, CT: Yale University Press, 1999. ISBN 0-300-08910-4
- Afflicted Powers: Capital and Spectacle in a New Age of War. With Iain Boal, Joseph Matthews and Michael Watts. London: Verso, 2005. ISBN 1-84467-031-7
- The Sight of Death: An Experiment in Art Writing. Yale University Press, 2006. ISBN 0-300-13758-3
- The Painting of Postmodern Life?. Barcelona: MACBA, 2009. ISSN 1886-5259
- Picasso and Truth: From Cubism to Guernica. Princeton, N.J.: Princeton University Press, 2013. ISBN 9780691157412
- Heaven on Earth: Painting and the Life to Come. London: Thames & Hudson, 2018. ISBN 9780500021385
- If These Apples Should Fall: Cézanne and the Present. London: Thames & Hudson, 2022. ISBN 9780500025284
- T.J. Clark on Bruegel. London: Thames & Hudson, 2024. ISBN 9780500028667
