= Anne Wagner =

American art historian

- Born: Anne Middleton Wagner
- Occupation: Art Historian
- Spouse: T. J. Clark
- Writing career
- Language: English
- Period: Modern and Contemporary Art
- Subject: Art History
- Notable work: Three Women (Three Artists)

Anne Middleton Wagner, often known as Anne Wagner, is an art historian. Class of 1936 Professor Emerita at the University of California, Berkeley, she is now based in London, where in 2013–14 she was Visiting Professor at the Courtauld Institute of Art.

== Education, life and work ==
Wagner attended Yale University in New Haven, Connecticut in 1971. In 1974 she received her B.A. and went to Harvard University for her Ph.D. which she received in 1980. In 2010 Anne Wagner and her husband T. J. Clark, who is also an art historian and taught at UC Berkeley, retired and moved to London. In 2013 she and Clark co-curated "Lowry and the 'Painting of Modern Life,'" a major exhibition of the British Painter L. S. Lowry at Tate Britain in 2013 "to argue for his achievement as Britain’s pre-eminent painter of the industrial city." She has also published on contemporary performance artists such as Vito Acconci and Laurie Anderson, and contemporary land artists like Nancy Holt.

== Selected publications ==
- Jean-Baptiste Carpeaux: Sculptor of the Second Empire, 1986.
- Three Artists (Three Women), 1996.
- Mother Stone: The Vitality of Modern British Sculpture, 2005.
- A House Divided: On Recent American Art, 2012.

== See also ==
- Women in the art history field
