= Bad Girls (art exhibition) =

New Museum art exhibition

Coordinates: 40.722318°N 73.992881°W

Bad Girls was a 1994 exhibition curated by Marcia Tucker. The show opened at the New Museum, in New York City, January 14, 1994. It was presented in two parts, part 1 lasting from January 14 to 27, 1994, and part 2 from March 5 to April 10, 1994.

Bad Girls was a humorous and transgressive look at gender and feminist issues. It featured work from artist across many media, including photo, painting, sculpture, performance, film, comics, advertisements, writings and more. The show was accompanied by film screenings, performances, and events. The exhibition had mixed reviews at the time and has continued to vex many critics, however, it is now seen as a crucial piece in a lineage of third-wave feminist exhibitions.

== Artists ==
- Ann Agee
- Laura Aguilar
- Janine Antoni
- Penny Arcade
- Xenobia Bailey
- Lillian Ball
- Linda Barry
- Elizabeth Berdann
- Camille Billops
- Molly Blieden
- Keith Boadwee
- Andrea Bowers
- Lisa Bowman
- Barbara Brandon
- Jennifer Camper
- Renee Cox
- Margaret Curtis
- Jeanne Dunning
- Nancy Dwyer
- Freida
- Matt Groening
- The Guerrilla Girls
- Jaqueline Hayden
- Maxine Hayt
- Janet Henry
- Amy Hill
- Robin Kahn
- Nina Kuo
- Pat Lasch
- Lauren Lesko
- Rhonda Lieberman
- Mable Maney
- Yasumasa Morimura
- Portia Munson
- Chuck Nanney
- Reno
- Erika Rothenberg
- Veronica Saddler
- Monique Safford
- Sybil Sage
- Joyce Scott
- Beverly Semmes
- Susan Silas
- Coreen Simpson
- Elaine Tin Nyo
- Cammie Toloui
- Carmelita Tropicana
- Dani Tull
- Shari Urquhart
- Carrie Mae Weems
- Judith Weinperson
- Pae White
- Millie Wilson
- Sue Williams

== Style ==
Bad Girls brought together works spanning many diverse styles and media. The common thread being humor. Within that category works tended to be avant-garde eschewing more traditional forms of even traditional media like painting and sculpture. Many works combined found objects. See Pink Project by Portia Munson, 1994. Interactive exhibits by the Guerilla Girls, Sybil Sage, Nancy Dwyer and Amy Hill. The sheer size of the exhibition may have led critics to see it as a feminist survey, however, the conspicuous absence of many renowned feminist names would speak otherwise. "The show includes drawings for feminist cartoons like Lynda Barry's God's Gift and Jennifer Camper's If Men Got Pregnant. It has a reading area with books like The Four Elements, by Roz Chast, Bad Girls Do It: An Encyclopedia of Female Murderers, by Michael Newton, and the comic book anthology Twisted Sisters: A Collection of Bad Girl Art."

== Concept ==
The show was conceptualised by curators Marcia Tucker and Marcia Tanner. Tanner also curated a sister show Bad Girls West at the UCLA Wight Gallery in Los Angeles. Tanner contributed significantly to the project and wrote one of several essays in the show's catalogue by the same name.

Both curators were influenced heavily by humorous takes on feminism. Marcia Tucker writes, "The work that particularly fascinated me and pushed me to rethink a lot of old issues had two characteristics in common. It was funny, really funny, and it went 'too far'."

Carnival is also frequently cited in the show's catalogue as a major influence. The ability of a carnavalesque sensibility to subvert norms and to turn the world on end can be a powerful weapon in feminist critiques and artworks and was used as such in the Bad Girls Exhibition. It had the added benefit of turning observers into participants and therefore creating a sense of community especially among a diverse audience. The show challenged an often prevailing view that feminist shows must be comprised strictly by women, another way in which it turned the common narrative on its head. It contained works by several men speaking about feminist ideas. In an interview in Paradoxa, Marcia Tucker stated, "I decided to open up the territory usually assigned to 'Bad Girls' to include men whose work also resists power and authority, and subverts social and cultural stereotypes in a feminist way. In my opinion, laughter is the first and finest form of self-criticism, and, when used by artists as a feminist tool, it can very effectively challenge even the biases which feminism itself sometimes constructs."

The artists represented in the show are seen as heirs to a lineage of "Bad Girl Mothers". Irreverent and transgressive artists having paved a path for their "daughters" allowing them to "produce critiques of the patriarchal construction of gender, but also to produce works that circumvent paternal constructs all together".

== Reception ==
Bad Girls received scathing reviews from many critics. Roberta Smith, writing for The New York Times, states, "Disappointment awaits anyone who approaches 'Bad Girls' for a reasonably accurate view of the new, angrily ironic feminist art – made by women, not children or men." She goes on to chastise many of the artists' specific pieces as derivative, and compares them to stale one-liners.

The show received plenty of criticism for omitting many prominent feminists. Bad Girls was not conceived of as a retrospective or comprehensive survey. The so-called "gaps" or "empty spaces" seem to be tactical, leaving opportunities for debate and conversation.

Another major criticism of the show was its title. A number of publications saw the use of the word girls as demeaning and problematic on many fronts.

Despite the abundant negative reviews many critics praised the work for taking on a subject which had not yet been tackled by any of the larger museums, and in a unique and novel way.

== Influence ==
While its initial reception was mixed at best, Bad Girls has become an influential piece of 3rd wave feminism. It is often seen now, in conjunction with many other early 1990s feminist exhibitions, as a stepping stone on the way to more contemporary feminist shows and ideas. It was sited in "Feminist Curating and the 'Return' of Feminist Art", in a conversation between curators Connie Butler, Amelia Jones, and Maura Reilly Bad Girls is seen as a precursor to shows like Wack! And Sexual Politics curated by Connie Butler and Amelia Jones respectively, which while focusing on art predating the Bad Girls show took cues from Marcia Tucker in their curation. The show was also a precursor to Daughters of Bad Girls which took place June 18, 2014

The show is also cited by Mignon Nixon in the article "Bad Enough Mother", where is seen as a "Profoundly liberating display of mother taught subversion", and by Susan Richmond in her article, "Sizing up the Dildo".
