= Kynaston McShine =

Trinidadian curator and public speaker

- McShine in 2008
- Born: Kynaston Leigh Gerard McShine; February 20, 1935; Port-of-Spain, Trinidad
- Died: January 8, 2018 (aged 82); Manhattan
- Known for: curating
- Awards: CCS Bard Award for Curatorial Excellence

Kynaston Leigh Gerard McShine (February 20, 1935 – January 8, 2018) was a Trinidadian born curator and public speaker. His visions about contemporary art made lasting contributions to the lives of countless artists and colleagues at the Museum of Modern Art in New York City where he worked from 1959 to 2008. He is said to be the first curator of color at a major American museum and at his retirement he had risen to the position of chief curator at large of painting and sculpture.

== Early life and education ==
Born Kynaston Leigh Gerard McShine to Leonora Pujadas and Austen Hutton McShine, Kynaston McShine was the elder of two children. Pujadas was president and founder of the League of Women Voters in Trinidad while his father was president of a bank.

As a child, McShine and his brother attended Queen's Royal College in Trinidad and Tobago. In 1958, McShine earned a bachelor of arts degree from Dartmouth College, where he studied philosophy. He began graduate studies at University of Michigan in 1959. After a brief period of employment, he continued his graduate studies at New York University.

== Career ==
In 1959, McShine was hired in the Museum of Modern Art (MoMA)'s public information department. From there, he moved to its department of circulating exhibitions, where he organized a traveling exhibit of work by Robert Motherwell.

McShine was Curator of Painting and Sculpture at the Jewish Museum from 1965–68, and served as acting director there from 1967-68. While there, he organized the first museum survey of Minimalist art, the seminal Primary Structures: Younger American and British Sculptors. In his review of the show, New York Times art critic Hilton Kramer called Primary Structures "one of those exhibitions that defines a period and fixes it irrevocably in one's consciousness."

After becoming associate curator at the MoMA in 1968, he initiated the Projects series, devoted to emerging, experimental art. Exhibitions in the Projects series included an early survey of Conceptual art, titled Information in 1970, as well as exhibitions of Marcel Duchamp (1973), Joseph Cornell (1980), Andy Warhol (1989), The Museum as Muse: Artists Reflect (1999), Edvard Munch: The Modern Life of the Soul (2006) and Richard Serra Sculpture: Forty Years (2007).

He held the position of associate curator in MoMA's Department of Painting and Sculpture until 1971, after which he assumed the roles of Curator of Exhibitions from 1971 to 1984; Senior Curator, 1984–2001; Acting Chief Curator 2001-03, and Chief Curator at Large from 2003 until his retirement in 2008.

In 2003, McShine was the recipient of the CCS Bard Award for Curatorial Excellence.

From 1965-1968 McShine taught at Hunter College.

== Notable exhibitions ==
=== Primary Structures ===
McShine's 1966 exhibition, Primary Structures: Younger American and British Sculptors, at the Jewish Museum was the first museum survey of minimalist art. It included work by artists such as Anne Truitt, Tony Smith, Gerald Laing, Carl Andre, Donald Judd, Robert Morris, and Sol LeWitt before the term "Minimalism" was used to describe their work. The groundbreaking show was restaged by the Jewish Museum in their 2014 exhibition Other Primary Structures. The show posited for the first time that artists may master design rather than a craft. Artist Mark di Suvero called the exhibition "the key show of the 1960s."

=== Projects series ===
McShine began MoMA's Projects series that focuses on small scale experimental work by emerging artists. The first exhibition in the series was work by artist Keith Sonnier, and continued with work by artists like Jonathan Borofsky, Sam Gilliam, Bill Beckley and Rafael Ferrer.

=== Information ===
In 1970, McShine curated an international survey of new conceptual art. The exhibition included 130 artists, filmmakers and collectives and was centered around the new influence of communication technologies and criticized the involvement of the US government in the war in Vietnam. The exhibit was effectively institutional critique, disrupting the accepted canon, unpacking art's new direction and introducing lesser known international artists like Hélio Oiticica, Marta Minujin and Group OHO alongside more familiar American artists like Lucy R. Lippard, Robert Smithson, Richard Serra, and Yvonne Rainer. The catalog for the exhibition featured a typewriter font and inexpensive stock, offering each artist space to do as they chose. In the catalog, McShine suggested painting might not be suited to tackle more contemporary issues that Conceptual art can.

=== Museum as Muse ===
In his 1999 exhibition, Museum as Muse: Artists Reflect, McShine re-examined institutional critique, bringing together artists that use the museum as their subject matter. He brought together work from artists like Marcel Duchamp, Joseph Cornell, Hans Haacke, Ed Ruscha, Sherrie Levine, Fred Wilson, Louise Lawler, Daniel Buren and Janet Cardiff. There were 182 works included of painting, video, printed brochure and installation art that ranged from critiquing the museum to celebrating it.

== Controversies ==
In 1984, McShine curated An International Survey of Recent Painting and Sculpture at MoMA. The exhibition purported to present the most notable recent work in contemporary art. Of 165 artists in the show, only 13 were women, spurring a group of women artists of the time to form Guerrilla Girls, who continue their activist performance and multi-media work today. In 2017, it was revealed that a wedding cake sculpture commissioned by McShine for the Museum of Modern Art from Pat Lasch as part of its fiftieth anniversary celebrations in 1979 was discarded by the museum sometime in the 1990s, a fact which was not disclosed to the artist until 2016.

== Personal life ==
McShine was photographed by Robert Mapplethorpe in 1988.
