= Erika Rothenberg =

American Artist

- Born: New York City, US
- Education: University of Chicago, The High School of Music & Art
- Known for: Installation, public art, painting, drawing, political art, social satire
- Website: erikarothenberg.com

Erika Rothenberg, House of Cards, installation of 90 satirical greeting cards, 1992, Museum of Modern Art, New York.

Erika Rothenberg is a Los Angeles–based conceptual artist whose work has included painting, drawing and photography, public art, sculpture and installation. Her art employs strategies and formats from mass media and persuasion, using words and images in familiar ways to present satirical, socially critical content, often with a subversive feminist point of view. In 2015, Artforum writer Michelle Grabner called Rothenberg's ironic use of vernacular signage and marketing strategies "relentless," characterizing her as "a harsh social critic with a facility for image-making, language and design … irony in Rothenberg’s hands is a barbed political weapon, and she wields it to underscore the very real injustices she observes in daily life."

Rothenberg has exhibited at venues including the Museum of Modern Art (MoMA), Los Angeles County Museum of Art (LACMA), New Museum, Museum of Contemporary Art Chicago (MCA), Hirshhorn Museum, and Documenta IX. Her work belongs to the public collections of MoMA, Museum of Contemporary Art Los Angeles, LACMA, MCA Chicago, and Stedelijk Museum voor Actuele Kunst (Ghent), among others.

== Education and early career ==
Rothenberg was born in New York City in 1950. She studied art at the University of Chicago until she was thrown out for participating in a student demonstration. After returning to New York in the early 1970s, she found work at the advertising agency McCann-Erickson; seeking to become an art director, she took a design night course at the School of Visual Arts and soon became the agency's first female in that position. She worked for eight years at the agency, for clients including Coca-Cola, NBC, Lufthansa and The New York Times, while creating art in her off-time.

Rothenberg began her art career in the late 1970s. She adapted her work experience to artmaking, melding dark humor and sociopolitical commentary with advertising's wide reach, directness, and blend of language and visuals. In her first decade, she exhibited in solo shows at P.P.O.W. Gallery (New York), W.P.A. (Washington) and Rosamund Felsen Gallery (Los Angeles), and group shows at Franklin Furnace, Artists Space, White Columns and The Alternative Museum, among others. New Museum director Marcia Tucker selected Rothenberg's work for "Not Just For Laughs: The Art of Subversion" (1980), the influential and divisive exhibition, "Bad Girls" (1994), and a 1989 solo exhibition. From the beginning, Rothenberg pursued socially committed art, participating in public projects organized by Group Material, among others. In a 2003 lawsuit, she inadvertently outed herself as "Kathe Kollwitz", one of the leaders of the Guerrilla Girls, an artists collective that organized anonymously in 1985 (adopting the names of dead women artists as pseudonyms) to publicize and combat sexism, racism and corruption in the art world.

== Work ==
Rothenberg's style has been described as "user-friendly," employing concise, deadpan prose and emblematic, often hand-painted imagery in unconventional contexts—fake ads, billboards, window displays, newspaper inserts—in order to examine American ideology, mass culture, and taboo subjects. Los Angeles Times critic Christopher Knight wrote that her work combines accessibility and "a resonant conceptual side" informed by the often-ignored political dimension of Pop art, "engaging a diverse and wide-ranging audience in a consideration of their shared situation as citizens." Leah Ollman placed Rothenberg among a long line of contemporary social satirists—from Barbara Kruger to Stephen Colbert—"spearing the status quo" with work that "induces cringes, queasy laughter and sighs of every stripe—pain, shame, outrage."

Erika Rothenberg, Freedom of Expression National Monument, wood, sheet metal, bronze plaque, 1984. New York, Creative Time’s "Art on the Beach." In collaboration with Laurie Hawkinson and John Malpede.

=== Early work – 1980s ===
Rothenberg first gained wide attention for her "Morally Superior Products" series (1980–90)—installations and storyboard paintings that promoted fictional companies and products, and comprised much of her first solo gallery exhibitions at P.P.O.W. in 1986 and 1987. Based on advertising strategies, the series employed bright colors, friendly faces and a relentless tone of upbeat cheeriness in order to examine intersections between American exceptionalism and consumerism through the creation of products with a moral conscience. Her products included "Sauce Against Racism" and "The Secret Penis"—hosiery that she supplemented with a sewn-in bulge designed to help women "feel equal" in the workplace; its tagline read: "A Woman Needs to Start At the Bottom In Order to Get to the Top!" Artforum critic Kate Linker described the work as "raunchy, rollicking, and deliberately unsubtle" in its political points. New York Times critic Michael Brenson wrote, "Rothenberg plunges us into the gap between appearance and reality ... there is a bleakness that suggests the view of America in the best works of F. Scott Fitzgerald and Joan Didion."

Rothenberg's 1989 New Museum window display, Have You Attacked America Today?, was described by director Marcia Tucker as "the most notorious exhibition" the museum hosted. The drugstore-like display offered tongue-in-cheek "Freedom of Expression Drugs" designed to facilitate citizen dissent (an anti-apathy ointment, "Offend" mouthwash, "Pro-Test" pills), a rewritten "Star-Spangled Banner," and flag-burning kits depicting fresh-faced, smiling adolescents subtly igniting American flags. Both popular and controversial, it was vandalized twice by visitors who broke the window and looted most of the goods, which Rothenberg replaced. The display was shown in Los Angeles in 1990 (along with a billboard work), and the products included in the Hirshhorn Museum show, "Brand New" (2018).

During this period, Rothenberg also created her first major public art work, Freedom of Expression National Monument (1984), in collaboration with architect Laurie Hawkinson and performance artist John Malpede for the Creative Time-commissioned exhibition "Art on the Beach." Inspired by early Soviet Agitprop, the monument consisted of a large red megaphone mounted atop a flight of stairs and pointed toward the Lower Manhattan skyline, inviting visitors to air their opinions and grievances. In 2003, New York Times architecture critic Herbert Muschamp proposed the project's reconstruction at Ground Zero. The following year, Creative Time re-presented it, this time facing the courthouses of Foley Square during American election season; it was also part of the Museum of the City of New York exhibition, "Art in the Open," in 2017.

=== Greeting cards and church signboards (Since 1991) ===
Erika Rothenberg, America, A Shining Beacon to the World, Aluminum and felt case, plastic letters, 2018.

In the 1990s, Rothenberg began producing satirical, hand-painted works that mimicked the form and generic sentimentality of greeting cards while examining a range of social and political ills and injustices. She presented ninety of them in the greeting store-styled installation, House of Cards (1992, MoMA), each one employing the one-two punch strategy of typical cards—an innocuous cover with a gotcha line on the inside—displayed side-by-side. The installation was organized with section wall plaques reading "Abortion," "Politics," "Racism," "Religion," and "Sexual Abuse," among others. Artforum's Patricia Phillips described the show as an assault "against the commercialization of feeling and our own complacency" that sought to "represent the space between silence and sensationalism."

Rothenberg restaged the exhibition in expanded versions in 2015–18 at Zolla Lieberman (Chicago), Charlie James (Los Angeles) and Susan Inglett (New York). The Los Angeles show included the new work, One World So Many Ways It Could End (2015), a pedestal-based sculpture whose wheel viewers could spin to see sixteen end-of-the-world scenarios ranging from global warming and nuclear war to zombie apocalypse or alien invasion. Reviews characterized the ongoing relevance of the greeting cards as "dismayingly timeless" observations that testified to their original astuteness.

In 1991, Rothenberg also began creating mock church signboards. They often suggested droll indices of despair in the form of weeklong church activity listings (e.g., AA, teen suicide watch, and "parenting your clone" groups); the first, America’s Joyous Future, was exhibited at Documenta IX in 1992. Nancy Princenthal described the signboards as indictments of both organized religion and the growing role of disorders in American self-definition and social involvement. Rothenberg's work of this time gradually took on a more oblique position and included more sculptural elements. Feeding Station (1992), for example, was a dense group of upturned, painted plywood profiles straining toward microphones dangling above them—a comment on country's growing need for public attention and psychic amplification.

=== Narrative works (Since 1993) ===
Rothenberg’s later work has explored subjects such as death, fame and gender relations, often taking on a more open-ended, narrative dimension inspired by news articles. Her collaboration with Tracy Tynan, "Suicide Notes" (1993–5, Rosamund Felsen, P.P.O.W., Centre for Contemporary Arts), presented seventeen messages left by real-life suicides, which they acquired from an LAPD source. The artists rewrote the notes (also changing names) and attached them to body bags hung against the wall, accompanied by a booklet with assembled quotes and facts about suicide. Reviews of the work were divided, with The New York Times calling it a "profoundly moving exhibit about a subject that most often provokes denial or a turning away," while others questioned whether it exploited or trivialized the subject. Monument to a Bear (2002-3) was a concrete tombstone memorializing a bear cub burned in a fire, then rescued by firefighters and nursed back to health at a wildlife shelter before being released into the wild—only to be legally shot by a hunter. The sculpture re-created the cub's head and bandaged paws alongside a bronze plaque presenting the Associated Press story it derived from.

Several projects offered what Art Issues called a "more gentle understanding" of gender issues. Rothenberg's 1997 show at Rosamund Felsen included the Smoke Gets in Your Eyes series, which presented people's relationship stories—good, bad and ugly. "The Stravinskys" series (2005) explored fame and death through photographs of the gravesites of 20th-century composer Igor Stravinsky and his wife Vera—identical except that his is strewn with gifts while hers is marked only by a bunch of dead flowers at its foot.

=== Public art ===
Rothenberg has completed public art commissions for Los Angeles, San Francisco, Washington, DC, Hartford and Philadelphia. Notable projects in addition to Freedom of Expression National Monument (1984) include several billboard works (two for Art Against AIDS, 1989) and two City of Los Angeles-commissioned works: Wall of Un(Fame)(1995) and The Road to Hollywood (2001). The Wall of Un(Fame) was a play on the Hollywood Walk of Fame, immortalizing the names, handprints and footprints of over 650 residents of nearby communities. The Road to Hollywood consisted of fifty succinct, black and white marble mosaic-texts—funny, poignant and straightforward stories of how people got started in Hollywood—embedded in a winding "red carpet" at a shopping center adjacent to the Kodak Theatre, home to the Academy Awards. The path led up to an oversized, period-styled, fiberglass daybed on an open patio overlooking the mythic Hollywood Sign. Christopher Knight ranked it "among the best public art projects in L.A.," one that gave "surprising new life" to pop clichés. In 2020, despite preservation efforts and press outcry, new owners demolished the work as part of a property makeover.

== Collections and other recognition ==
Rothenberg's work belongs to numerous museum collections, including the Art Institute of Chicago, FAE Musée d'Art Contemporain (Lausanne), Los Angeles County Museum of Art, Museum of Contemporary Art Chicago, Museum of Contemporary Art Los Angeles, Museum of Contemporary Art North Miami, Museum of Modern Art, New Museum, Orange County Museum of Art, Rose Art Museum, Stedelijk Museum voor Actuele Kunst (Ghent), Tang Museum, and Walker Art Center, among others. She has been awarded grants from Art Matters (1990), the Norton Family Foundation (1990), and the Getty Center (1993).
