= Laurie Hawkinson =

American architect (born 1952)

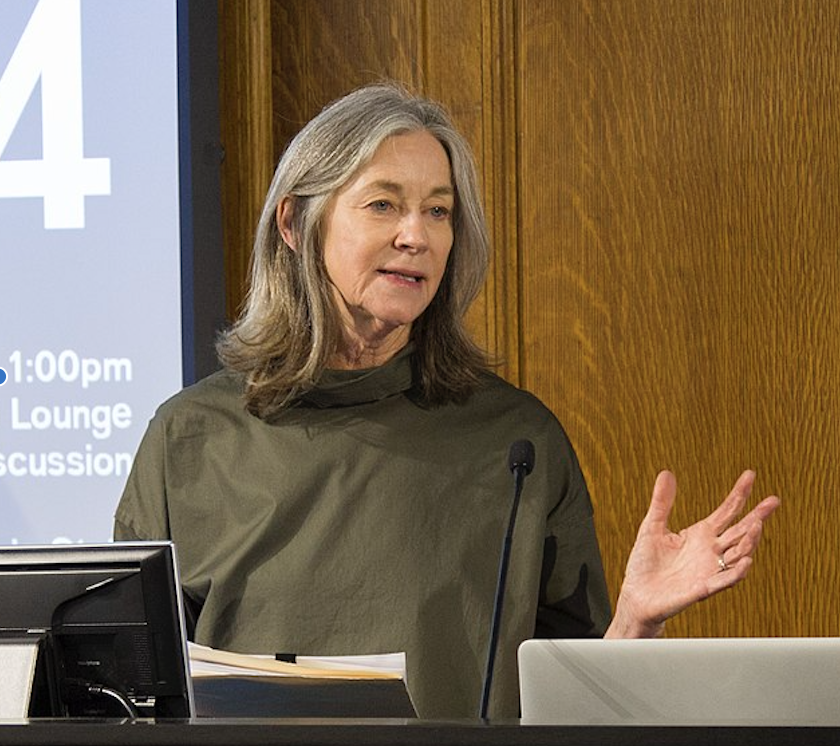
- Born: Laurie Ann Hawkinson; March 25, 1952 (age 74); California, USA
- Education: B.A., M.A., University of California, Berkeley; AR., 1983, Cooper Union
- Occupation: architect
- Spouse: Henry H. Smith-Miller (m. 1997)

Laurie Ann Hawkinson (born March 25, 1952) is an American architect. She worked at Institute for Architecture and Urban Studies and is a partner at Smith-Miller + Hawkinson Architects. Hawkinson is also a Professor of Architecture at Columbia University’s Graduate School of Architecture.

== Early life and education ==
Hawkinson was born on March 25, 1952. She was educated at the University of California, Berkeley where she received a Bachelor of Fine Arts and a master's degree. After graduating from the University of California, Berkeley, Hawkinson travelled to New York to enrol in the Whitney Museum's Independent Study Program. While there, she was encouraged by director Jane G. Rice to apply as an art handler, which she accepted. According to the New York Times, Hawkinson was the only woman art handler in a major New York museum at the time.

== Career ==
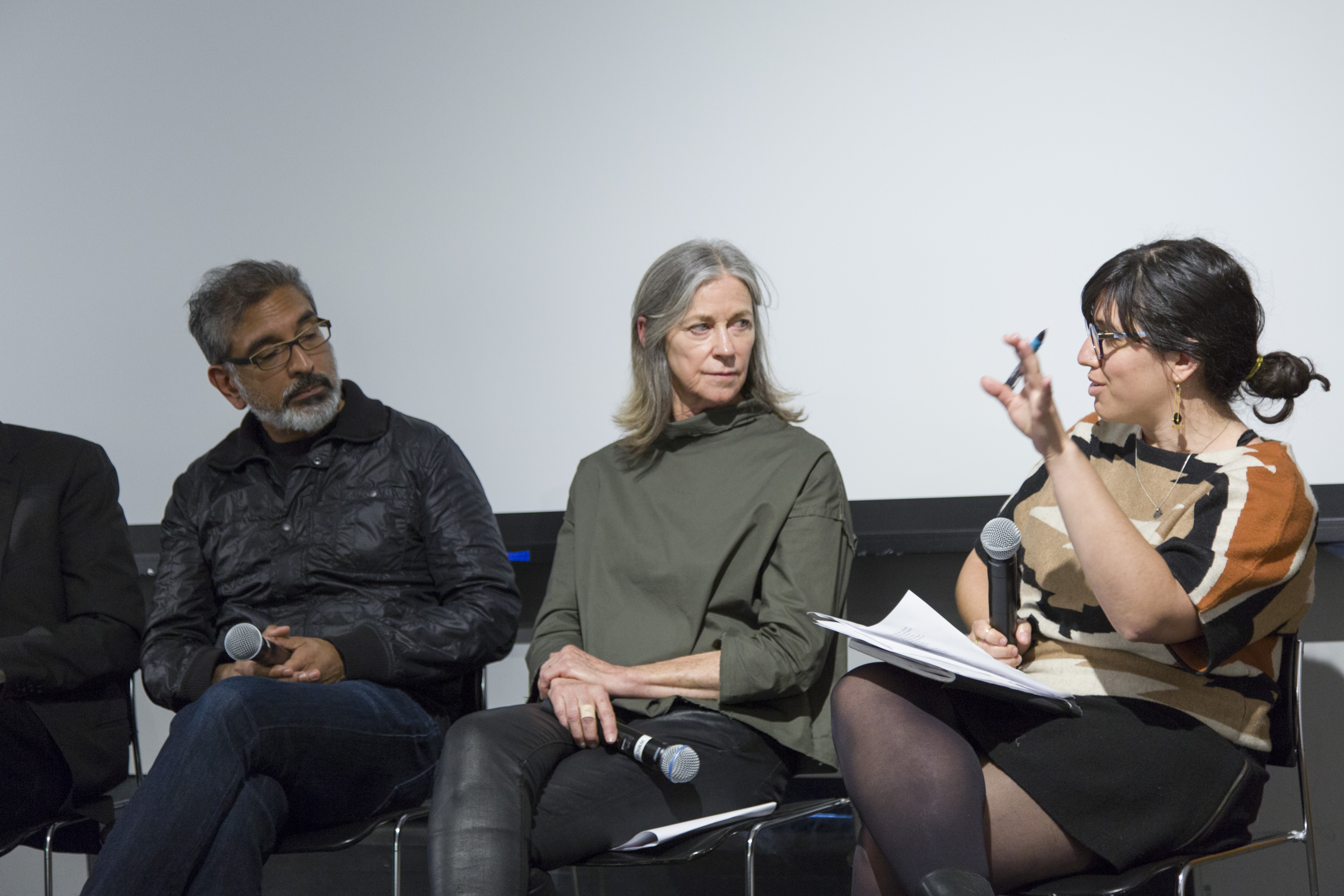
Vishaan Chakrabarti, Hawkinson, & Valerie Stahl at The First 100 Days, Day 64.

After graduating from Cooper Union, Hawkinson co-founded an architecture firm with Henry H. Smith-Miller in 1983. The following year, Hawkinson collaborated with Erika Rothenberg and John Malpede to create the Freedom of Expression National Monument, in Battery Park City for its Creative Time Art on the Beach project. Their monument was a giant megaphone aimed at encouraging people to voice their opinions. In 2004, their monument was again exhibited in Lower Manhattan from August to November. During this time, Hawkinson sat as a panelist for the New York State Council on the Arts in Architecture, Planning and Design from 1986 until 1989.

In 1987, Hawkinson (AP) and Smith-Miller were selected to design the Institute of Contemporary Art, Philadelphia at the University of Pennsylvania. They were subsequently awarded the 1989–1990 Faculty Design Award from the Association of Collegiate Schools of Architecture. The following year, Hawkinson was named an Eeero Saarinen Visiting Professor at Yale University. She then spent three years at the Southern California Institute of Architecture as a Visiting Critic and Graduate Thesis Advisor.

While serving as the director of Columbia's Graduate School of Architecture Planning and Preservation (GSAPP), Hawkinson collaborated with Vishaan Chakrabarti to connect New York's Financial District to Governors Island through a land bridge made of landfill. In 2016, she was appointed to the Public Design Commission by New York mayor Bill de Blasio.
