= Guerrilla Girls =

Feminist and antiracist art collective

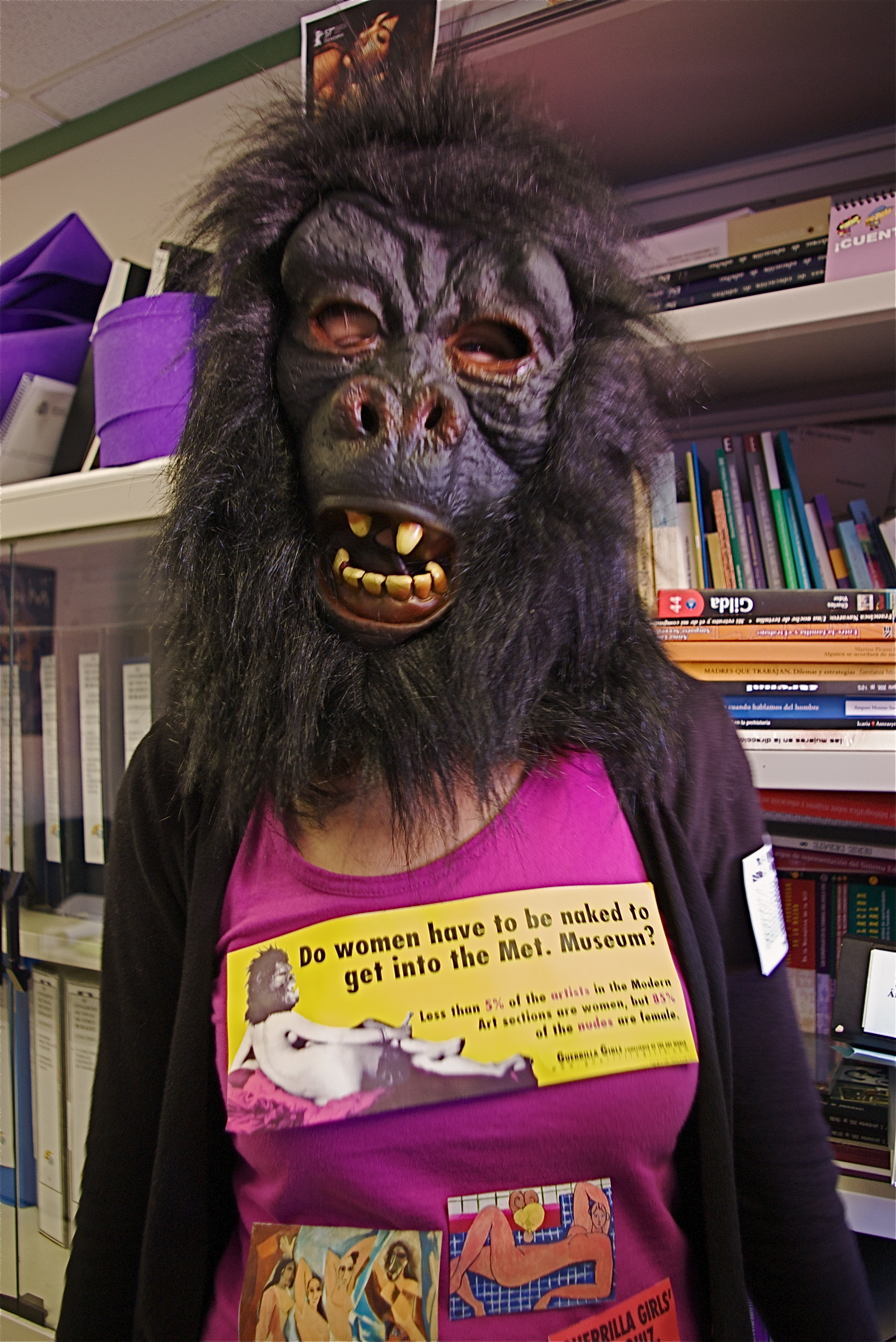
- An anonymous member in 2008
- Formation: 1985
- Headquarters: New York City, United States
- Region served: Worldwide
- Official language: English
- Website: guerrillagirls.com

External videos
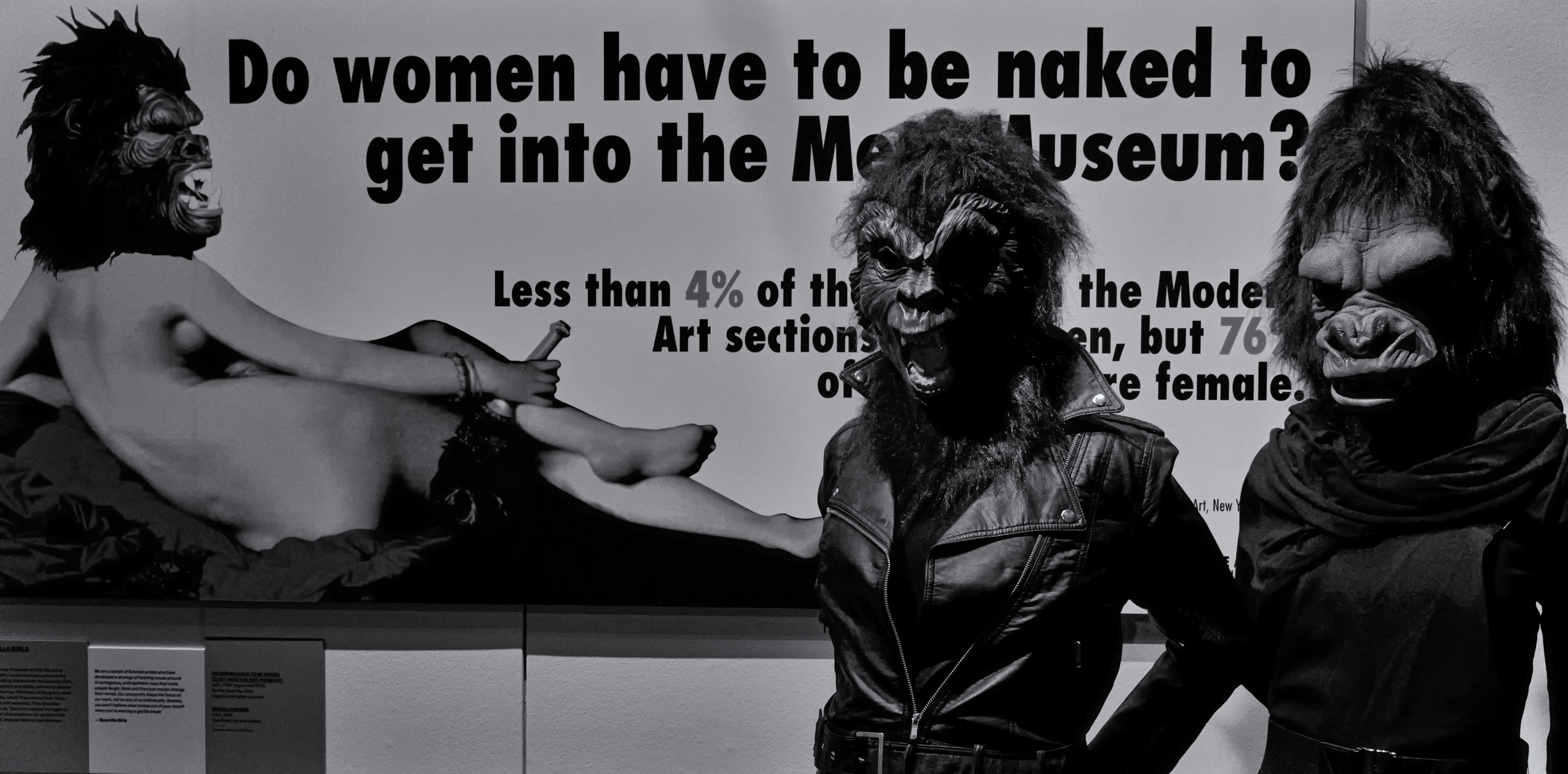
- “Curator’s Perspective: Guerrilla Girls”, National Museum of Women in the Arts, July 31, 2025

Guerrilla Girls is an anonymous group of feminist, female artists devoted to fighting sexism and racism within the art world. The group formed in New York City, United States in 1985, born out of a picket against the Museum of Modern Art the previous year. The core of the group's work is bringing gender and racial inequality into focus within the greater arts community and society at large.

The Guerrilla Girls employ culture jamming in the form of posters, books, billboards, lectures, interviews, public appearances and internet interventions to expose disparities, discrimination, and corruption (the latter includes conflicts of interest within museums). They also often use humor in their work to make their serious messages engaging. The Guerrilla Girls are known for their "guerrilla" tactics, hence their name, such as hanging up posters or staging surprise exhibitions.

To remain anonymous, members don gorilla masks. On interviews, they use pseudonyms that refer to deceased female artists such as Frida Kahlo, Käthe Kollwitz, and Alice Neel, as well as writers and activists, such as Gertrude Stein and Harriet Tubman. According to GG1, identities are concealed because issues matter more than individual identities, "Mainly, we wanted the focus to be on the issues, not on our personalities or our own work."

== History ==
During the height of the contemporary art movement in the late 20th century, many distinguished galleries lacked appropriate representation of female artists and curators. Museums were often privately funded by elites, predominately white males, meaning that museums were documenting power structures rather than art. Historically, the Metropolitan Museum of Art in New York, like other major museums, had an entirely male or a predominantly male board of directors. It had a paucity of female artists on display, while, at the same time, art featuring female nudes were plentiful. The Guerrilla Girls were formed in 1985 with the purpose of exposing gender disparities in the contemporary art world. Initially, it did not plan to be a permanent organization. Its first press release, dated May 6, addressed its "campaign throughout the next weeks and next season." Membership in the group has fluctuated over the years from a high of about 30 women to a handful of active members in 2015 According to Frida Kahlo, there have been a total of 65 members.

In the spring of 1985, seven women launched the Guerrilla Girls in response to the Museum of Modern Art's exhibition "An International Survey of Recent Painting and Sculpture" (1984), whose roster of 165 artists included only 13 women. Inaugurating MoMA's newly renovated and expanded building, this exhibition claimed to survey that era's most important painters and sculptors from 17 countries. The proportion of artists of color was even smaller (one account puts the number at eight), and none of them were women.

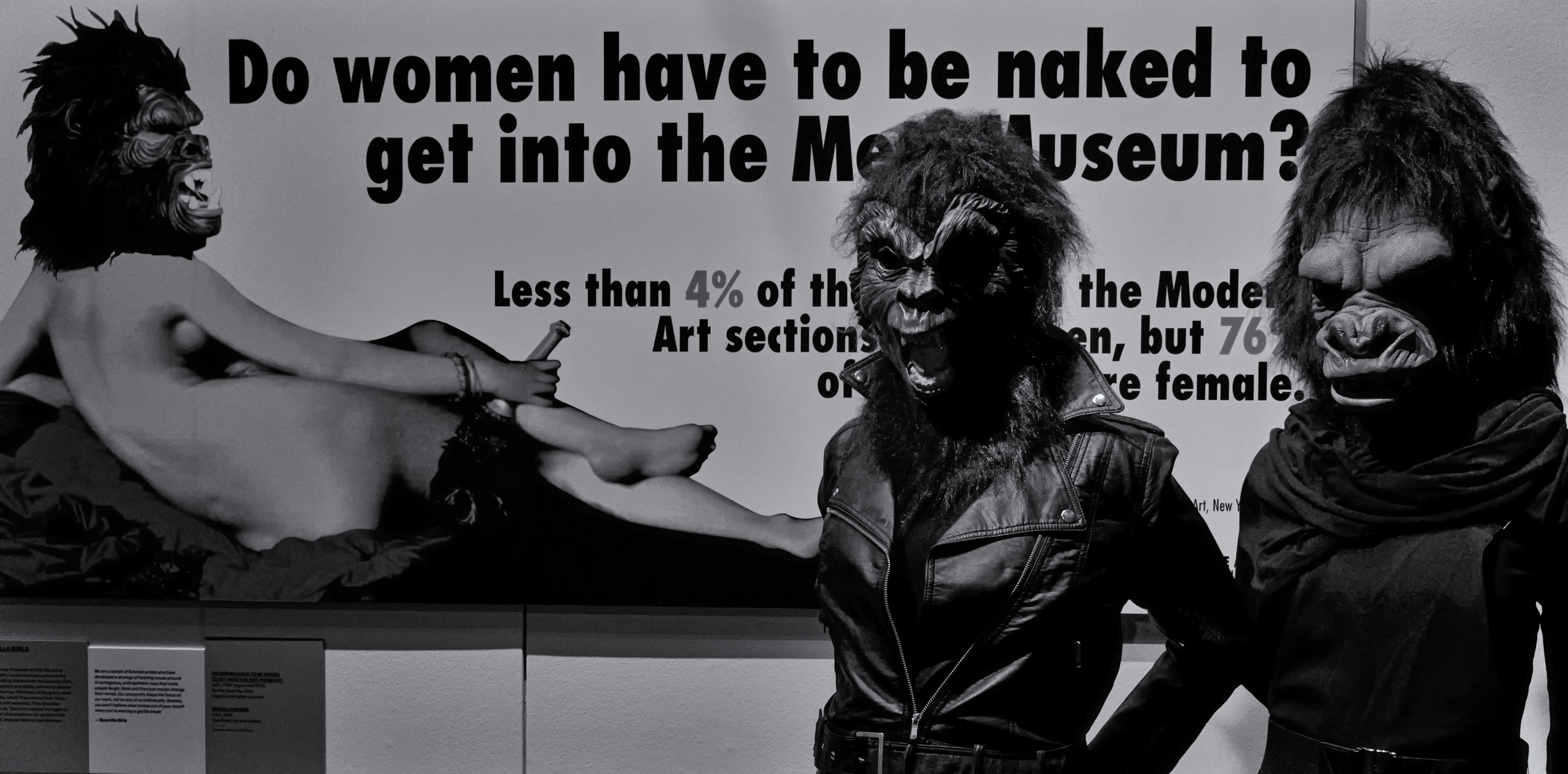
Guerrilla Girls at the Victoria and Albert Museum, London

Comments attributed to the show's curator, Kynaston McShine highlight that era's explicit art world gender bias: "Kynaston McShine gave interviews saying that any artist who wasn't in the show should rethink his career." However, it has been suggested that these putative quotes stem from comments in an interview McShine gave to the New York Times before the exhibition opened: “I think that some people can benefit from not being in the show.” He continued: “They will have to think about their work.” In reaction to the low proportion of women in the exhibition and McShine's bias, the Women's Caucus for the Arts led a protest with pickets across the street from MoMA. Seven future members of the Guerrilla Girls participated in this protest, but when their pickets were ignored, some of the women began to seek what Frida Kahlo calls "a more media-savvy" method of reaching the public.

The MoMA protest's lack of success in 1984 led to strategy meetings, which resulted in the formation of the Guerrilla Girls. The initial founding members were all white. The Guerrilla Girls conveyed their messages by wheat-pasted posters in downtown Manhattan, particularly in the SoHo and East Village neighborhoods, which were home to both artists and the commercial galleries that served as their initial targets.

When asked about the masks, the girls answer "We were Guerrillas before we were Gorillas. From the beginning, the press wanted publicity photos. We needed a disguise. No one remembers, for sure, how we got our fur, but one story is that at an early meeting, an original girl, a bad speller, wrote 'Gorilla' instead of 'Guerrilla'. It was an enlightened mistake. It gave us our 'mask-ulinity'." In an interview with the magazine Interview the Guerrilla Girls were quoted, "Anonymous free speech is protected by the Constitution. You'd be surprised what comes out of your mouth when you wear a mask."

A year after its founding, the group expanded its focus to include racism in the art world, attracting artists of color. They also took on projects outside of New York, enabling them to address sexism and racism nationally and internationally. Though the art world has remained the group's main focus, the Guerrilla Girls' agenda has included sexism and racism in films, mass and popular culture, and politics. Tokenism also represents a major group concern.

Periodically, the Guerrilla Girls conducted "weenie" and "banana" counts, wherein members visited institutions like the Metropolitan Museum of Art and counted nudes, noting the ration of male-to-female subjects, as well as the ratio of male-to-female artists represented in the various collections. Data gathered from their survey in the Met in 1989 showed that women artists had produced less than 5% of the works in the Modern Art galleries, while 85% of the nudes were female.

Early organizing was based around meetings, during which members evaluated statistical data gathered regarding gender inequality within the New York City's art scene. The Guerrilla Girls also worked closely with artists, encouraging them to speak to those within the community to bridge the gender gap where they perceived it.

Since 1985, the Guerrilla Girls have worked for an increased awareness of sexism and greater accountability on the part of curators, art dealers, collectors, and critics. The group is credited, above all, with sparking dialogue, and bringing national and international attention to issues of sexism and racism within the arts.

== Influences ==
Many feminist artists in the 1970s dared to imagine that female artists could produce authentically and radically different art, undoing the prevailing visual paradigm. The pioneering feminist critic, Lucy Lippard curated an all-women exhibition in 1974, effectively protesting what most deemed a deeply flawed approach, that of merely assimilating women into the prevailing art system. Shaped by the 1970s women's movement, the Guerrilla Girls resolved to devise new strategies. Most noticeably, they realized that 1970s-era tools such as pickets and marches proved ineffective, as evidenced by how easily MoMA could ignore 200 protestors from the Women's Caucus for Art. "We had to have a new image and a new kind of language to appeal to a younger generation of women", recalls one of the founding Guerrilla Girls, who goes by "Liubov Popova." The Guerrilla Girls sought an alternative approach, one that would defeat views of the 1970s Feminist movements as man-hating, anti-maternal, strident, and humorless: Versed in poststructuralist theories, they adopted 1970s initiatives, but with a different language and style. Earlier feminists tackled grim and unfunny issues such as sexual violence, inspiring the Guerrilla Girls to keep their spirits intact by approaching their work with wit and laughter, thus preventing a backlash.

== Work: actions, posters and billboards ==
=== Art world ===
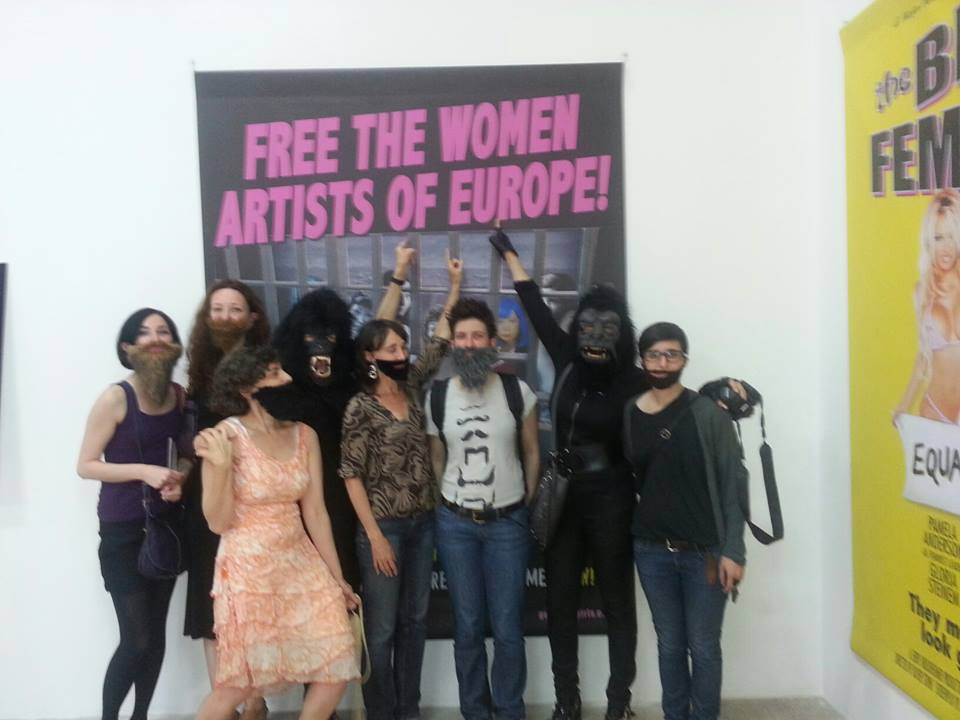
French feminist group La Barbe (Beard) meets the Guerrilla Girls at the Palais de Tokyo (Paris, 2013)

Throughout their existence, the Guerrilla Girls have gained attention for their bold protest art. The Guerrilla Girls' projects (mostly posters at first) express observations, concerns, and ideals regarding numerous social topics. Their art has always been fact-driven and informed by the group's unique approach to data collection, such as "weenie counts." To be more inclusive and to make their posters more eye-catching, the Guerrilla Girls pair facts with humorous images – a form of word art. Although the Guerrilla Girls gained fame for wheat-pasting provocative campaign posters around New York City, the group has also enjoyed public commissions and indoor exhibitions.

In addition to posting posters around downtown Manhattan, they passed out thousands of small handbills based on their designs at various events. The first posters were mainly black and white fact sheets, highlighting inequalities between male and female artists with regard to a number of exhibitions, gallery representation, and pay. Their posters revealed how sexist the art world was in comparison to other industries and to national averages. For example, in 1985 they printed a poster showing that the salary gap in the art world between men and women was starker than the United States average, proclaiming "Women in America earn only 2/3 of what men do. Women artists earn only 1/3 of what men do." These early posters often targeted specific galleries and artists. Another 1985 poster listed the names of some of the most famous working artists, such as Bruce Nauman and Richard Serra. The poster asked "What do these artists have in common?" with the answer "They allow their work to be shown in galleries that show no more than 10% of women or none at all."

The group was also activists for equal representation of women in institutional art, and highlighted artist Louise Bourgeois in their "Advantages to Being a Women artist", poster in 1988 as one line read, "Knowing your career might not pick up till after you're 80." Their pieces are also notable for their use of combative statements such as "When racism and sexism are no longer fashionable, what will your art collection be worth?"

"Dearest Art Collector" (1986) is a 560x 430 mm screen-print on paper. This is one of 30 posters published in a portfolio entitled "Guerrilla Girls Talk Back". This print is unusual in the portfolio in that it takes the form of an enlarged handwritten letter on baby pink paper. The extremely rounded cursive script crowned with a frowning flower exudes femininity, symbolizing the biting sarcasm for which the Guerrilla Girls were known. The Guerrilla Girls sent this poster to well-known art collectors across the United States, pointing out how few works they owned by women artists. This send-up of femininity is aimed at the expectation that, even when presenting a serious complaint, women should do so in a socially acceptable 'nice' way. "We know that you feel terrible about this" appeals to the feelings of the recipient. This piece was a commentary on how hard it is for female artists, and what lengths they must go through in order to be recognized and taken seriously. Women are constantly expected to perform a certain way and this print is the embodiment of how tumultuous it is for women all around the world to be recognized in the eyes of men with power. The group later transcribed it into other languages and sent it to collectors outside the U.S. A practical joke with serious implications, this poster is now (somewhat ironically) a collector's item.

The posters were rude; they named names and they printed statistics (and almost always cited the source of those statistics at the bottom, making them difficult to dismiss). They embarrassed people. In other words, they worked.

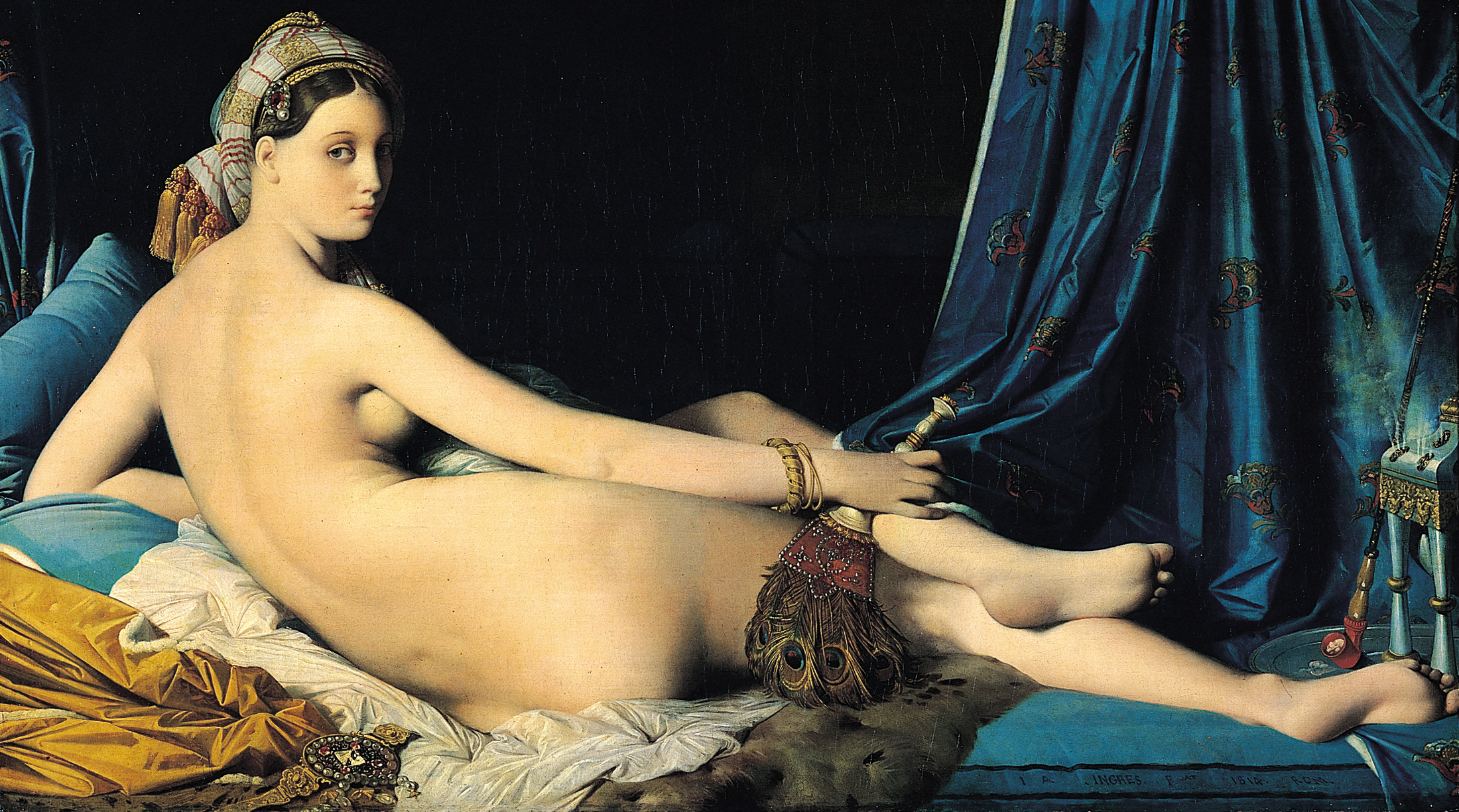
Grande Odalisque (1814) by Ingres

The Guerrilla Girls' first color poster, which remains the group's most iconic image, is the 1989 Metropolitan Museum poster, which used data from the group's first "weenie count". In response to the overwhelming number of female nudes counted in the modern art sections, the poster asks, sarcastically, "Do women have to be naked to get into the Met. Museum?". Next to the text is an image of Jean-Auguste-Dominique Ingres's painting Grande Odalisque (1814, Louvre Museum). The Guerrilla Girls placed a gorilla mask over the head of Ingres' nude, which is one of the most famous female nudes in Western art. The New York Public Art Fund had rejected the Guerrilla Girls' Metropolitan Museum poster for a billboard they had commissioned from the group. Rather than change the image, the group bought advertising space from the MTA, and the poster traversed lower Manhattan on New York City buses, until the MTA declined to renew their contract (evidently because they thought the fan handle looked phallic). In 2021, the Metropolitan Museum poster was donated to the Met, and in 2021–22, it was featured in the exhibition Prints: Revolution, Resistance, and Activism.

A 2005 Guerrilla Girl recount at the Met found that only 3% of the exhibited artists in the modern section were women, whereas the nude females constituted 83% of the nudes in those galleries. The 2012 Guerrilla Girl poster reported 4% women artists, and a figure of 76% female nudes, reflecting a lower percentage of women artists and female nudes from 1985. A survey of other sections of the Metropolitan Museum gives different results. Art critic Christopher Allen states that proportionately more female artists and fewer nudes are in the 18th century section, and Mary Beard writes in her 2018 book, Civilisations: How Do We Look, that it took centuries in Greek antiquity until Praxiteles created the first female nude, Aphrodite of Knidos.

In 1990, the group designed a billboard featuring the Mona Lisa that was placed along the West Side Highway supported by the New York City Public Art Fund. Stickers also became a popular calling cards representative of the group.

The Guerrilla Girls infiltrated the bathrooms of the newly opened Guggenheim Museum SoHo, placing stickers regarding female inequality on the walls. In 1998, Guerrilla Girls West protested at the San José Museum of Art, over low representation of women artists.

In addition to researching and exposing sexism in the art world, the Guerrilla Girls have received commissions from numerous organizations and institutions, such as The Nation (2001), Fundación Bilbao Arte (2002), Istanbul Modern (2006) and Witte de With Center for Contemporary Art (2007). They have also partnered with Amnesty International, contributing pieces to a show under the organization's "Protect the Human" initiative.

They were interviewed for the film !Women Art Revolution.

In 1987, the Guerrilla Girls published thirty posters in a portfolio entitled Guerrilla Girls Talk Back. One specifically, We Sell White Bread, was a poster made to gradually widen their focus, tackling issues of racial discrimination in the art world and also making more direct, politicized interventions. In 1987, the image on this poster was first seen as peel-off stickers on gallery windows and doors in New York. Its medium, screen print on paper, has the words "We Sell White Bread" and are stamped on a slice of white bread alongside a list of ingredients that includes the white male artists whose work is on display at the galleries. According to the poster, the galleries favored white, male artists, noting that the gallery "contains less than the minimum daily requirement of white women and non-whites".

=== Public commissions ===
In 2005, the group exhibited large-format posters Welcome to the Feminist Biennale at the Venice Biennale (the first in 110 years to be overseen by women), scrutinizing 101 years of Biennale history in terms of diversity. Where Are the Women Artists of Venice? explored the fact that most works owned by Venice's historical museums are kept in storage.

Since 2005, the Guerrilla Girls have been invited to produce special projects for international institutions, sometimes for the very institutions, they have criticized. Offers that pose a dilemma are carefully considered, so as to avoid censure since one way to improve institutions is to criticize them from inside.

In their 2006 poster The Future for Turkish Women Artists as Revealed by the Guerrilla Girls, commissioned by İstanbul Modern, they claimed that the status of women artists in Turkey was better than in the rest of Europe. In 2007, The Washington Post published their "Horror on the National Mall!", a one-page newspaper spread attacking the absence of diversity among tax-payer supported museums on the Mall in Washington, DC. During the 2007 ART-ATHINA, the Guerrilla Girls projected "Dear Art Collector" in Greek onto the entrance's façade. In 2015, they projected their "Dear Art Collector" animation onto a museum façade, taking on collectors who fail to pay employees a living wage. To commemorate the 20th anniversary of the École Polytechnique massacre, the University of Quebec commissioned their Troubler Le Repos (Disturbing The Peace) poster, whose texts addressed anti-women hate speech since Ancient Greece to Rush Limbaugh.

In 2009, they launched I'm not a feminist, but If I were this is what I'd complain about ... , an interactive graffiti wall that enables women who don't see themselves as feminists the means to target gender issues with the hope that active participation will broaden their perspectives. In 2012, this traveled to Krakòw's Art Boom Festival.

In 2011, Columbia College Chicago's Glass Curtain Gallery and Institute for Women and Gender in the Arts and Media commissioned the first Guerrilla Girls survey of Chicago museums. The resulting banner entitled Chicago Museums [Guerrilla Girls to Museums: Time for Gender Reassignment!] critiqued gender disparity in the contemporary art collections of the Art Institute of Chicago and the Museum of Contemporary Art.

In 2012, an advertising truck towed Do women Have To Be Naked To Get into Boston Museums? around Boston. Invited by Yoko Ono to participate in the 2013 Meltdown Festival, the Guerrilla Girls updated their 2003 Estrogen Bomb poster, which had premiered in The Village Voice in 2003.

During Winter 2016, they participated in "Twin City Takeover", art exhibitions and art projects organized by a consortium of local art organizations sited around Minneapolis and St. Paul.

In 1996, Guerrilla Girls came out with Planet Pussy in Monkey Business issue #4 in November 1996. This was a work about feminism and was published by Sike Burmeister and Sabine Schmidt.

=== Film world ===
Guerrilla Girls billboard in Los Angeles protesting white male dominance at the Oscars in 2002

To protest the lack of female directors, the Guerrilla Girls distributed stickers during the 2001 Sundance Film Festival. The Nation invited them to present Birth of Feminism, which they updated and presented in 2007 as a banner outside Witte de With Center for Contemporary Arts. Since 2002, Guerrilla Girls Inc. have designed and installed billboards during the Oscars that address white male dominance in the film industry, such as: "Anatomically Correct Oscars", "Even the Senate is More Progressive than Hollywood", "The Birth of Feminism", "Unchain the Women Directors".

During the 2015 Reykjavík Arts Festival, the Guerrilla Girls displayed National Film Quiz, a billboard criticizing the fact that 87% of national funding for films goes to men, despite women playing an important part of Iceland's public and private sectors. In light of 2016's #Oscarssowhite campaign, the Guerrilla Girls updated the above billboards, presenting them on downtown Minneapolis streets for "Twin City Takeover".

In 2023, the Guerrilla Girls were featured in the episode "Bodies of Knowledge of the American streaming series Art in the Twenty-First Century, season 11., in which they presented a new body of work.

=== Politics and social issues ===
Although the Guerrilla Girls' protest art directed at the art world remains their most well-known work, throughout their existence the group has periodically targeted politicians, specifically conservative Republicans. Those criticized have included George Bush, Newt Gingrich, and most recently Michele Bachmann. In 1991, the Artist and Homeless Collaborative invited them to work with homeless women to create posters in response to homelessness and the first Gulf War. Between 1992 and 1994, Guerrilla Girl posters addressed the 1992 presidential election, reproductive rights (done for the march on Washington in 1992), gay and lesbian rights, and the 1992 Los Angeles riots. During the 2012 election, they displayed their Even Michele Bachman believes.... on a billboard adjacent to a football stadium to advertise her plan to: ban same-sex marriages, require voter ID checks, and spend money implementing statewide voter IDs. Their 2013 posters discussed the Homeland Terror Alert system and Arnold Schwarzenegger's gubernatorial campaign.

In 2016, the Guerrilla Girls launched the "President Trump Announces New Commemorative Months" campaign in the form of stickers and posters, which they distributed during the Women's March on Washington in Los Angeles and New York City, as well as the J20 event at the Whitney Museum of Art and the Fire Fink protest at MoMA.

== Work: publications and merchandise ==
To shed light on inequality in the art world, the Guerrilla Girls have published numerous books. In 1995, they published their first book, Confessions of the Guerrilla Girls, a compilation of 50 works plus a self-interview. In 1998, they published The Guerrilla Girls Bedside Companion to the History of Western Art, a consciousness-raising comic book that sold 82,000 copies, as it explores how art history's male domination constrained several female artists' careers. In 2003, they published Bitches, Bimbos and Ballbreakers, a down and dirty catalogue of "The Top Stereotypes from Cradle to Grave". Offering thumbnail histories for cultural clichés ranging from "Daddy's Girl", "the Girl Next Door", "the Bimbo/Dumb Blonde" to "the Bitch/Ballbreaker", each is given "trademark Guerrilla Girl treatment: pointed factoids and cool graphics".

Their 2004 book The Guerrilla Girl's Museum Activity Book (reissued in 2012) parodies children's museum activity books. Meant to teach children how to both appreciate and critique museums, this book provides activities that reveal the problematic aspects of museum culture and major museum collections. In 2009, they produced a history of hysteria, The Hysterical Herstory Of Hysteria And How It Was Cured From Ancient Times Until Now. MFC-Michèle Didier published it in 2016.

== Presentations ==
An important part of Guerrilla Girls' outreach since 1985 has been presentations and workshops at colleges, universities, art organizations, and sometimes at museums. The presentations, known as "gigs", attract hundreds and sometimes thousands of attendees. In the gig, they play music, videos, show slides and talk about the history of their work, how it has evolved. In the end, the GGs interact with audience members. New work is always included and gig material changes all the time. They have done hundreds of these events and have traveled to nearly every state as well as Europe, South America, and Australia.

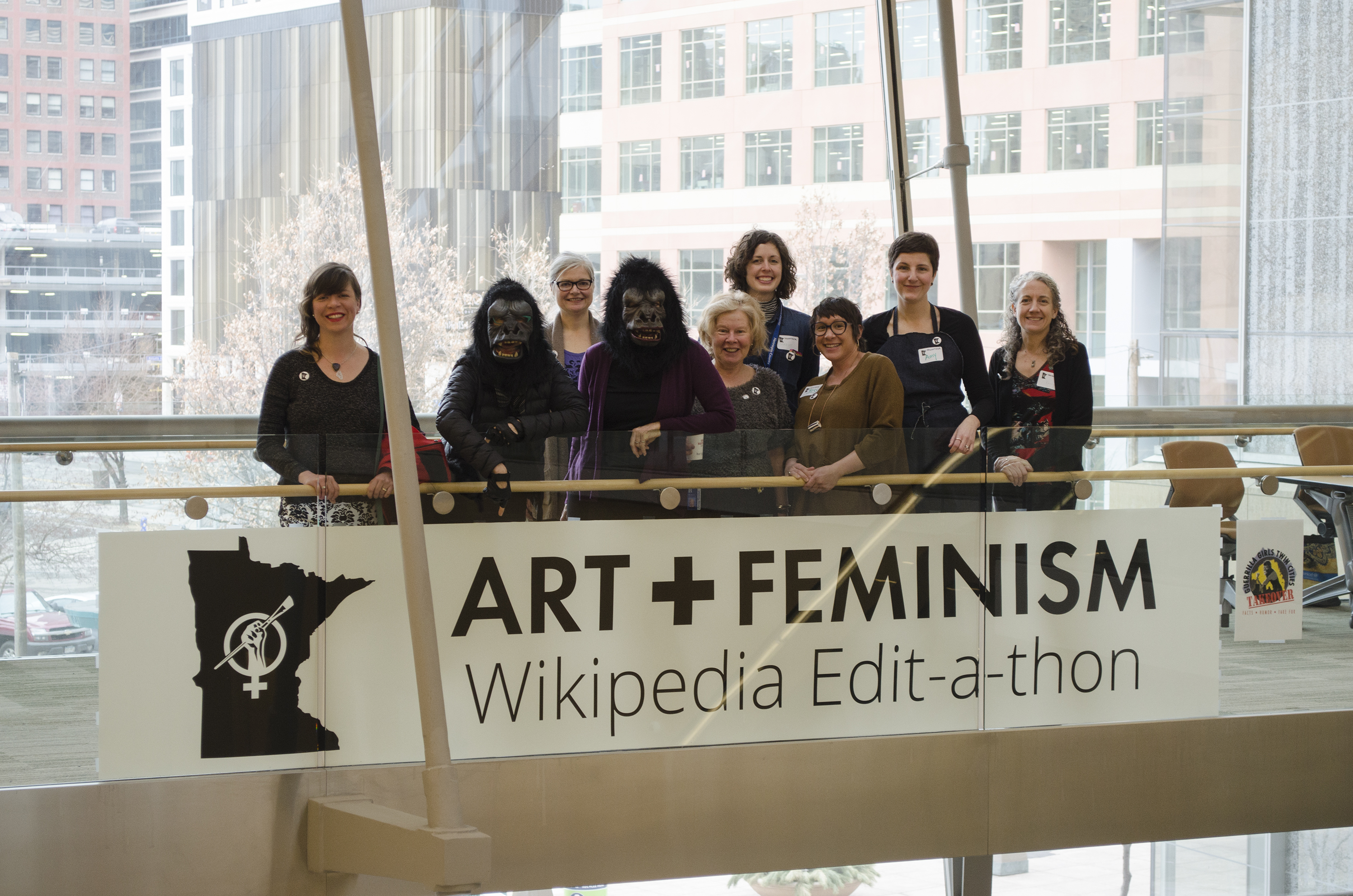
Organizers with the Guerrilla Girls, Art+Feminism Wikipedia Edit-a-thon, Minneapolis

In recognition of their work, the Guerrilla Girls have been invited to give talks at world-renowned museums, including a presentation at the MoMA's 2007 "Feminist Futures" Symposium. They have also been invited to speak at art schools and universities across the globe and gave a 2010 commencement speech at the School of the Art Institute of Chicago. To mark the 30th anniversary of the Guerrilla Girls, Matadero Madrid hosted "Guerrilla Girls: 1985–2015", an exhibition featuring most of the collective's production accompanied by a series of events including a talk/performance by Guerrilla Girl members Frida Kahlo and Käthe Kollwitz. The exhibition also showed the 1992 documentary "Guerrilla in Our Midst" by Amy Harrison.

Three Guerrilla Girls appeared on the Stephen Colbert show on January 14, 2016.

== Exhibitions ==
Early solo exhibitions included: "The Night the Palladium Apologized" (1985), Palladium (New York City); "Guerrilla Girls Review the Whitney" (1987), Clocktower PS1; and "Guerrilla Girls" (1995), Printed Matter, Inc.

Career surveys include:

- "Guerrilla Girls Talk Back: The First Five Years, A Retrospective: 1985–1990" (1991), the Falkirk Cultural Center, San Rafael, California
- "The Guerrilla Girls" (2002), Fundacíon Bilbao Arte, Bilbao, ES
- "Guerrilla Girls" (2007), Hellenic American Union Galleries, Athens, GR
- "Guerrilla Girls: Retrospective" (2009), Millennium Court Arts Centre, UK *"Feminist Masked Avengers: 30 Early Guerrilla Girls' Posters" (2011) Mason Gross School of the Arts Galleries
- "The Guerrilla Girls Talk Back" (2011), National Museum of Women in the Arts, Washington, DC
- "Not Ready to Make Nice: The Guerrilla Girls in the Art World and Beyond" Columbia College Chicago (2012–2017) Traveled to Monserrat College of Art; Krannert Art Museum; Fairfield University; Georgia Museum of Art; DePauw University; North Michigan University: Stony Brook University: California State University: The Verge Center for the Arts: and Moore College for Art and Design.
- "Guerrilla Girls: 1985–2013", Azkuna Zentroa (2013).
- "Guerrilla Girls: Takeover" (2021), Nasher Sculpture Center, Dallas, Texas.
- "Guerrilla Girls: Making Trouble" (2025) Guerrilla Girls mark their fortieth anniversary in 2025 exhibition at the National Museum of Women in the Arts
- "How to be a Guerrilla Girl", Getty Center, Los Angeles, California (2025–2026)

On the heels of "Not Ready to Make Nice" were:

- "The Male Graze: Guerrilla Girls", 2021, Museum of London
- "Art at the Center: Guerrilla Girls", 2016, Walker Art Center
- "Front Room: Guerrilla Girls", 2016–2017, Baltimore Museum of Art
- "Guerrilla Girls: Not Ready to Make Nice, 30 Years and Still Counting", 2015, Abrons Arts Center;
- "Media Networks: Andy Warhol and the Guerrilla Girls", 2016, Tate Modern
- "Not Ready to Make Nice: Guerrilla Girls 1985–2016", 2016–2017, FRAC Lorraine.
- "The Guerrilla Girls and La Barbe", 2016, Gallery mfc-micheledidier, Paris.
- "Guerrilla Girls" The Verge Center for the Arts, Sacramento, California (2017)

== Controversies ==
=== Diversity ===
Despite having routinely challenged art institutions to display more artists of color, both members and critics want the Guerrilla Girls to be more diverse. Their art was believed to be exclusive to white feminism and they addressed by creating a series of activist artworks addressing a range of issues that women faced. "Zora Neale Hurston" recalls Guerrilla Girl membership as "mostly white" and largely mirroring the art world demographics that they critiqued. They have "staunchly, and problematically, resisted being surveyed as to the makeup of their own membership".

Despite sporting gorilla masks to downplay personal identity, some members attribute Guerrilla Girl interests to the fact that de facto leaders "Frida Kahlo" and "Käthe Kollwitz" are both white. ("Frida Kahlo" has also been criticized for her appropriation of a Latina artist's name.) The artist believed in the overt artistic expression by correlating beauty and pain, along with the rise of modernism. Several Guerrilla Girls who are people of color have faced numerous challenges. Despite the Guerrilla Girls' stance against tokenism, some artists of color abandoned Guerrilla Girl membership due to tokenism, silencing, disrespect, and whitewashing. As a woman of color, "Alma Thomas" describes having felt uncomfortable wearing the Guerrilla Girls' signature gorilla mask. "Thomas" recalls little effort being devoted to understanding the challenges of artists of color. "Their whiteness was such that they ... didn't understand that blacks were being put in a completely separate world in the art world, that black male artists and black female artists are completely separated, completely segregated to this day." Ultimately, this widespread antagonism led to many "artists of color [leaving] after a few meetings because they could sense the unspoken hierarchy in the group".

=== Second-wave feminism and essentialism ===
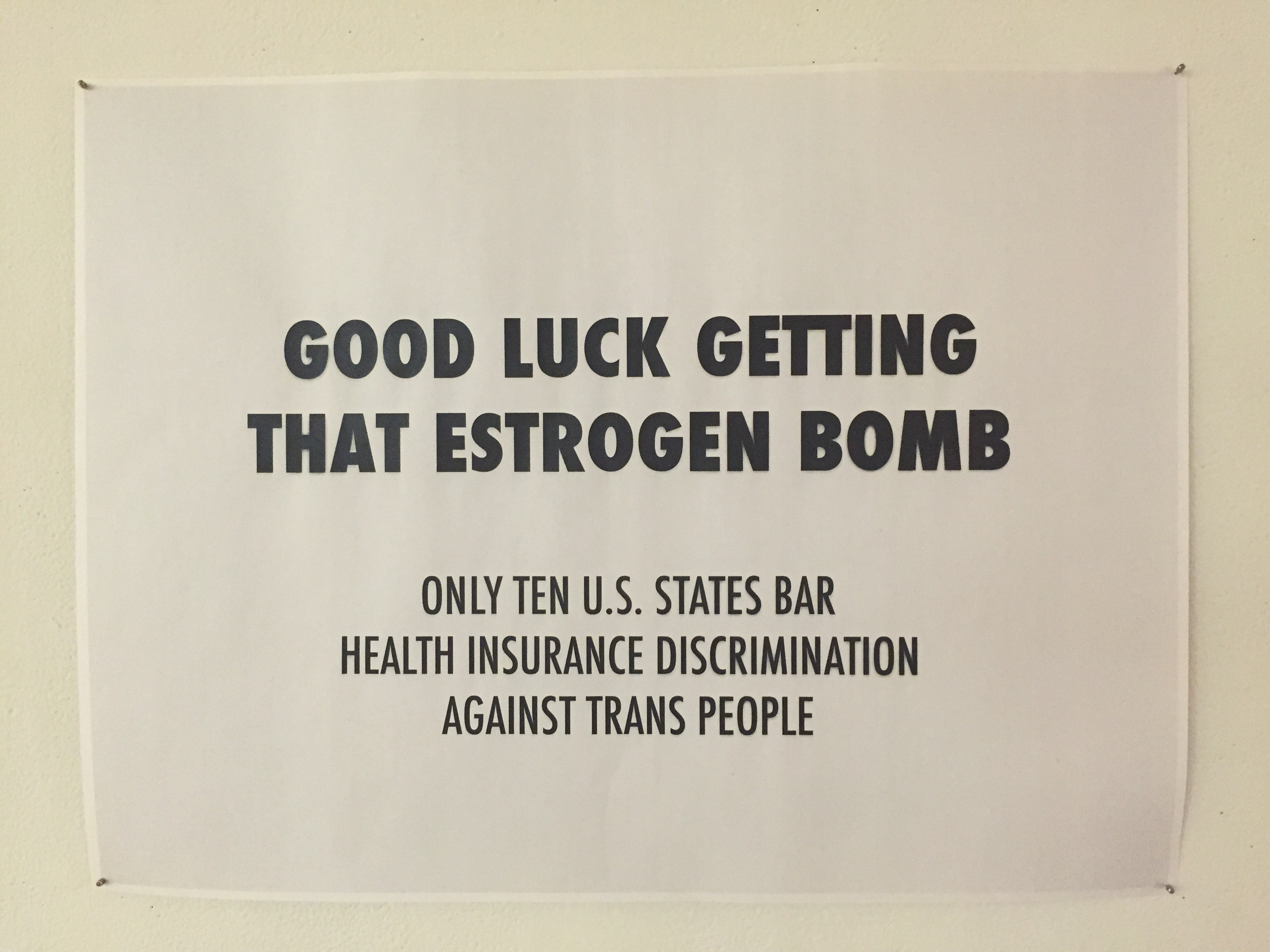
Anonymous MCAD student protest against the Guerrilla Girls

Emerging at the tail end of the second-wave feminist movement, the Guerrilla Girls navigated the differences between established and emerging feminist theory during the 1980s. "Alma Thomas" describes this grey-area that the Guerrilla Girls occupied as "universalist feminism", bordering on essentialism. Art historian Anna Chave considers the Guerrilla Girls' essentialism much more profound, leading the group to be "assailed by ... a rising generation of women wise in the ways of poststructuralist theory, for [their] putative naiveté and susceptibility to essentialism". Essentialist views are most clearly exhibited in two Guerrilla Girl books:The Guerrilla Girls Bedside Companion to the History of Western Art (1998) and the controversial Estrogen Bomb (2003–13) campaign. Regarding the former, "Alma Thomas" worried that The Guerrilla Girls Bedside Companion to the History of Western Art "was so embedded in that second-wave feminist and even pre-second-wave essentialism" that it fulfilled some assumption that all women artists are feminist artists.

Students at Minneapolis College of Art and Design criticized their Estrogen Bomb poster campaign, describing it as insensitive towards transgender people since it ties the female gender to estrogen, the same sort of essentialist link the Guerrilla Girls aim to critique. Aside from essentialism, the Guerrilla Girls have also been critiqued for failing to integrate intersectionality into their work.

=== Internal disputes ===
Leading up to a highly publicized 2003 lawsuit, there was increasing animosity toward "Frida Kahlo" and "Käthe Kollwitz". Despite founding members' initial intention to create a non-hierarchal, equitable power structure, there was an increasing sense that two people were making "the final decisions no matter what you said". Several Guerrilla Girls felt that their second book, The Guerrilla Girls Bedside Companion to the History of Western Art, primarily represented the views of "Kahlo" and "Kollwitz". Some even felt that "Kahlo" and "Kollwitz" completely controlled the book, despite their having selected material created collectively by all Guerrilla Girls. There was even suspicion that these two not only claimed all the credit but took all of the profits. Some members condemned the book as "undemocratic and ... against the spirit of the [Guerrilla] Girls".

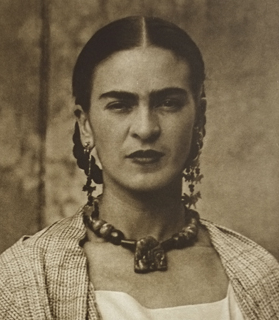
Artist Frida Kahlo

As the Guerrilla Girls gained in popularity, tensions led to what the Girls later called the "banana split", as five members actually split from the collective. Soon after several members stepped aside to form Guerrilla Girls Broadband, "Kahlo" and "Kollwitz" moved to trademark the name "Guerrilla Girls, Inc." to distinguish their realm from those of Guerrilla Girls BroadBand and Guerrilla Girls On Tour! whose focus is discrimination in the theater world. Even though their former colleague "Gertrude Stein" was in the on-tour group, "Kahlo" and "Kollwitz" charged them with copyright and trademark infringement and unjust enrichment. Many members of the group felt especially betrayed that "Kahlo" and "Kollwitz" had launched their lawsuit under their real names, Jerilea Zempel and Erika Rothenberg.

This prompted negative reactions from both current and former Guerrilla Girls, who objected to "Kahlo" and "Kollwitz" claiming responsibility for having created the collective effort, as well as the flippancy with which they exchanged their anonymity for legal standing.

Judge Louis L. Stanton, who handled the case, rejected the "bizarre" suggestion that defendants sporting gorilla masks be allowed to testify in his courtroom. He also stated that "Mundane court procedures for adjudicating legal rights and the ownership of property require direct and cross-examination of real persons with real addresses and attributes."

In their 45-page complaint, "Kahlo" and "Kollwitz" described themselves as the group's "guiding forces", even though the Guerrilla Girls were "informally organized, [and] had no official hierarchy". Initially, they asked the court to stop Guerrilla Girls Broadband from calling themselves Guerrilla Girls and sought millions of dollars in damages. In 2006, they settled with the theatre group who agreed to go by Guerrilla Girls on Tour. As of 2013, three separate groups remained active, the GuerrillaGirlsBroadBand, Inc., Guerrilla Girls On Tour, Inc. (the Theatre Girls), and Guerrilla Girls, Inc. The Guerrilla Girls BroadBand focuses on the internet as its "natural habitat".

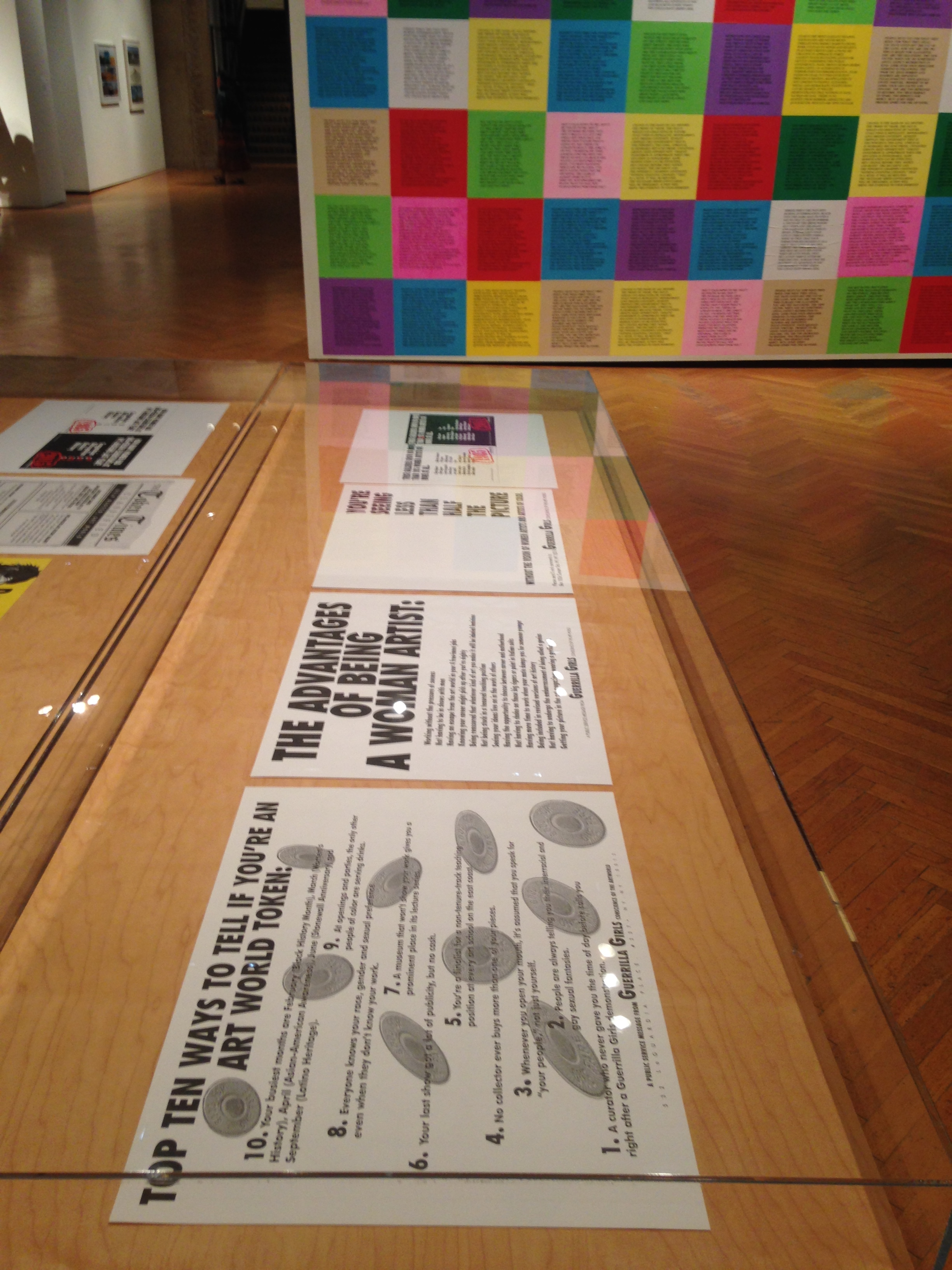
Guerrilla Girls display at Mills College; Public Works: Artists' Interventions 1970s–Now

=== Museum Exhibitions ===
Upon their 1985 debut, the Guerrilla Girls were "lauded by the very establishment they sought to undermine". They have since exhibited at Tate Modern, Venice Biennale, Centre Pompidou, and MoMA, which additionally grants them a broader audience for their concerns. Since then, this relationship has only intensified, as the Guerrilla Girls presented their exhibitions in museums and even allowed their works to be collected by hegemonic institutions. Although some have questioned the efficacy, if not hypocrisy, of the group's working within the system that they originally denigrated, few would challenge their decision to let the Getty Research Institute house their archives. Since the Getty Research Institute acquiring the early archive of the Guerrilla Girl's work, it has become the most requested archive in the Getty Research Institute's collection, and it is the most complete collection of Guerrilla Girls material in the world.

== Members and names ==
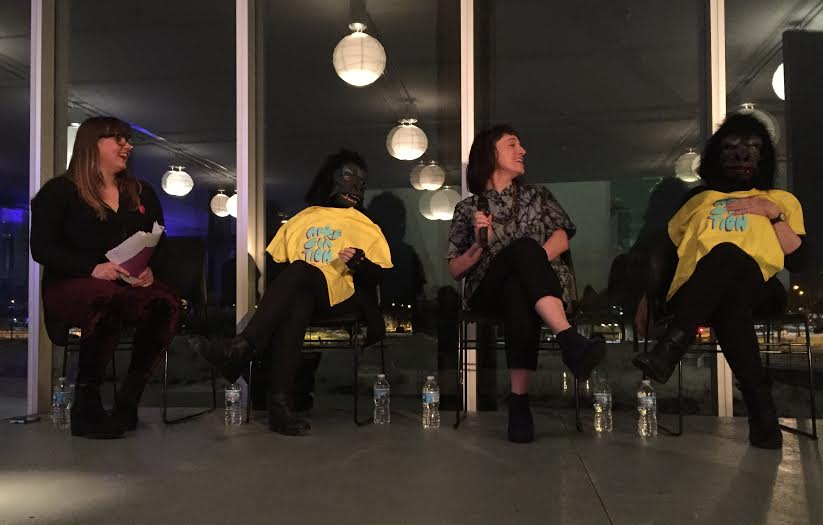
Two members of the Guerrilla Girls join a panel discussion at the Rochester Art Center in 2016 in Rochester, Minnesota.

Membership in the New York City group is exclusive, by invitation only, based on relationships with current and past members, and one's involvement in the contemporary art world. A mentoring program was formed within the group, pairing a new member with an experienced Guerrilla Girl to bring them into the fold. Due to the lack of formality, the group is comfortable with individuals outside of their base claiming to be Guerrilla Girls; Guerrilla Girl 1 stated in a 2007 interview: "It can only enhance us by having people of power who have been given credit for being a Girl, even if they were never a Girl." Men are not allowed to become Guerrilla Girls but may support the group by assisting in promotional activities.

Guerrilla Girls' names are pseudonyms generally based on dead female artists. Members go by names such as Käthe Kollwitz, Alma Thomas, Rosalba Carriera, Frida Kahlo, Alice Neel, Julia de Burgos, Liubov Popova, and Hannah Höch. Guerrilla Girls' "Carriera" is credited with the idea of using pseudonyms as a way to not forget female artists. Having read about Rosalba Carriera in a footnote of Letters on Cézanne by Rainer Maria Rilke, she decided to pay tribute to the little-known female artist with her name. This also helped to solve the problem of media interviews; the group was often interviewed by phone and would not give names, causing problems and confusion amongst the group and the media. Guerrilla Girl 1 joined in the late 1980s, taking on her name as a way to memorialize women in the art community who have fallen under the radar and did not make as notable as an impact as the names takes on by other members.

"Kahlo" and "Kollwitz" were identified as Jerilea Zempel and Erika Rothenberg in a 2003 lawsuit.

For some members like "Zora Neale Hurston", or Emma Amos, identities have only been made public posthumously.

In August 2025, the Italian art magazine Artribune reported that, in an interview with a member using the pseudonym “Alice Neel”, the member identified herself as painter Robin Tewes.

In 2026, Joyce Kozloff revealed herself as a Guerrilla Girls founding member with the pseudonym “Liubov Popova”. She stated that there were seven inaugural Guerrilla Girls and that the group had agreed to reveal the pseudonyms only of deceased members, but she had decided to disclose her identity herself.

In 2026, artist Christina Schlesinger stated that she had participated in the early activities of the group under the pseudonym “Romaine Brooks”, discussing her involvement in its formation, her artistic practice, and the political context that led women artists in New York to organize collectively during the 1980s.

== Gorilla symbolism ==
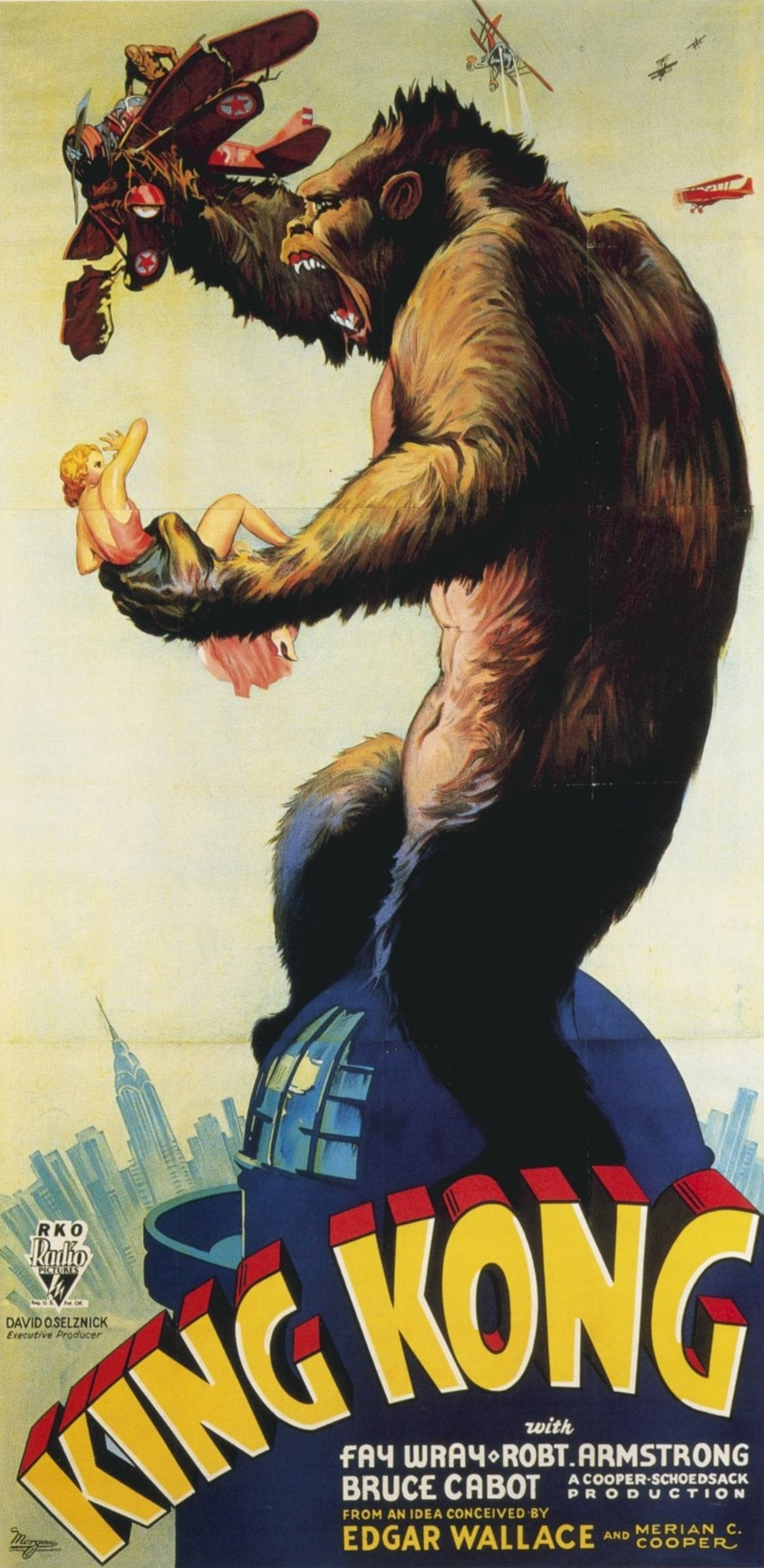
The 1933 film King Kong was influential to the concept of a Guerrilla Girl.

The idea to adopt the gorilla as the group's symbol stemmed from a spelling error. One of the first Guerrilla Girls accidentally spelled the group's name at a meeting as "gorilla". Despite the fact that the idea of using a gorilla as a group symbol might have been accidental, the choice is nevertheless pertinent to the group's overall message in several key ways.

To begin with, the gorilla in popular culture and media is often associated with King Kong, or other images of trapped and tamed apes. In the 2010 SAIC Commencement, the comparison between institutionalized artists and tamed apes was explicitly made:

And last, but not least, be a great ape. In 1917, Franz Kafka wrote a short story titled "A Report to an Academy", in which an ape spoke about what it was like to be taken into captivity by a bunch of educated, intellectual types. The published story ends with the ape tamed and broken by the stultified academics. But in an earlier draft, Kafka tells a different story. The ape ends his report by instructing other apes NOT to allow themselves to be tamed. He says instead: break the bars of your cages, bite a hole through them, squeeze through an opening ... and ask yourself where do YOU want to go

The gorilla is also typically associated with masculinity. The Met Museum poster is in part shocking because of its juxtaposition of the eroticized female odalisque body, and the large, snarling gorilla head. The addition of the head detracts from the male gaze and changes the way in which viewers are able to look at or understand the highly sexualized image. Further, the addition of the gorilla questions and modifies stereotypical notions of female beauty within Western art and popular culture, another stated goal of the Guerrilla Girls.

Guerrilla Girls, who wear the masks of big, hairy, powerful jungle creatures whose beauty is hardly conventional ... believe all animals, large and small, are beautiful in their own way.

Though this goal has never been explicitly stated by the group, in the history of Western art, primates have often been associated with the visual arts, and with the figure of the artist. The idea of ars simia naturae ("art the ape of nature") maintains that the job of art is to "ape", or faithfully copy and represent nature. This was an idea first popularized by Renaissance thinker Giovanni Boccaccio who alleged that "the artist in imitating nature only follows Nature's own command".

== Legacy ==
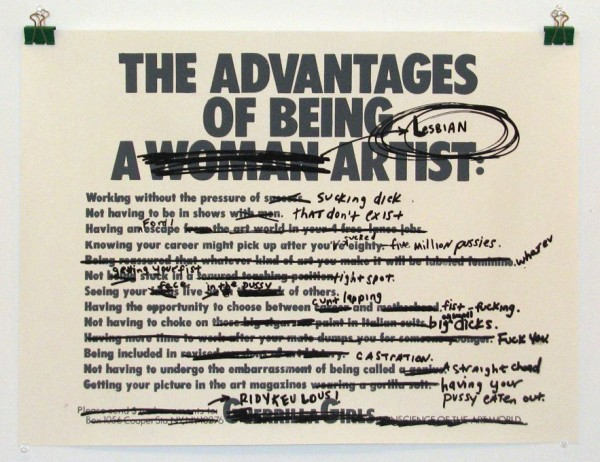
Ridykeulous, The Advantages of Being a ~~Woman~~ Lesbian Artist, 2007

The group Ridykeulous overwrote the 1988 Gorilla Girls' poster The Advantages of Being a Woman Artist with their own messages in 2007.

== Notable collections ==
- Art Institute of Chicago, Chicago, Illinois
- Center for the Study of Political Graphics, Culver City, California
- Fales Library and Special Collections, New York University, New York City
- Madison Museum of Contemporary Art, Madison, WI
- Museum of Modern Art, New York City
- Tate, United Kingdom
- Walker Art Center, Minneapolis, Minnesota
- Whitney Museum of American Art, New York City

== Other notable exhibitions ==
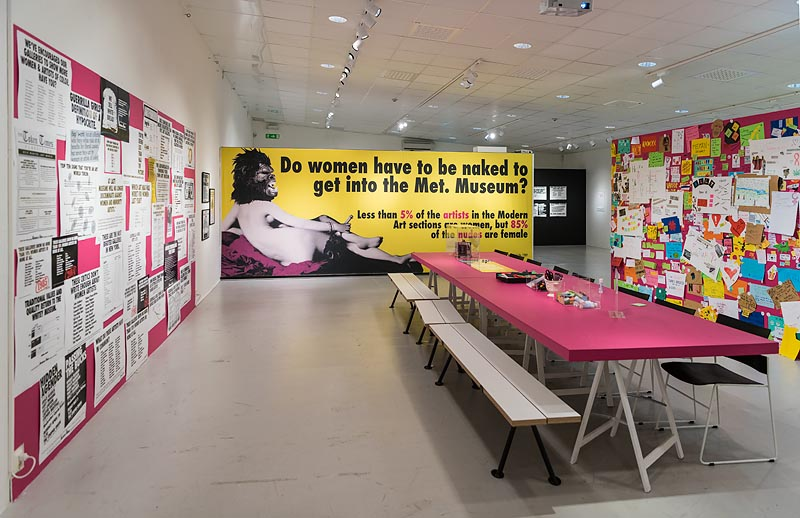
Guerrilla Girls Portfolio Exhibition, Mjellby Art Museum, Sweden. September 29, 2018 – January 27, 2019.

- Meet the Guerrilla Girls, 2020 – present, Carnegie Museum of Modern Art, Pittsburgh, PA https://carnegieart.org/resource/meet-the-guerrilla-girls/
- Beyond the Streets, 2018, Los Angeles
- Guerrilla Girls Review the Whitney, 1987, The Clocktower, New York City
- Guerrilla Girls: Exposición Retrospectiva, 2013, Alhóndiga Bilbao, Bilbao, Spain
- Guerrilla Girls: Not Ready to Make Nice, 30 Years and Still Counting, Abron Arts Center, New York City
- Media Networks: Andy Warhol and the Guerrilla Girls, (display), 2016, Tate Modern, London, United Kingdom
- Not Ready to Make Nice: Guerrilla Girls in the Artworld and Beyond, 2012–2017, Columbia College Chicago, Chicago Illinois (traveled to 10 additional venues around the US)
- GUERRILLA GIRLS: GRÁFICA, 1985–2017, São Paulo Museum of Art, São Paulo, Brazil

== See also ==
- Feminist art criticism
- Feminist art movement in the United States
- Guerrilla Girls On Tour
