= Ann Agee =

American visual artist

- Born: 1959 (age 66–67); Philadelphia, Pennsylvania, US
- Education: Yale School of Art, Cooper Union School of Art
- Known for: Ceramic sculpture, installation art, painting, drawing
- Awards: John S. Guggenheim Fellowship, Anonymous Was A Woman Award, New York Foundation for the Arts, Louis Comfort Tiffany Foundation, National Endowment for the Arts
- Website: Ann Agee Studio

Ann Agee (born 1959) is an American visual artist whose practice centers on ceramic figurines, objects and installations, hand-painted wallpaper drawings, and sprawling exhibitions that merge installation art, domestic environment and showroom. Her art celebrates everyday objects and experiences, decorative and utilitarian arts, and the dignity of work and craftsmanship, engaging issues involving gender, labor and fine art with a subversive, feminist stance. Agee's work fits within a multi-decade shift in American art in which ceramics and considerations of craft and domestic life rose from relegation to second-class status to recognition as "serious" art. She first received critical attention in the influential and divisive "Bad Girls" exhibition, curated by Marcia Tucker at the New Museum in 1994, where she installed a functional, handmade ceramic bathroom, rendered in the classic blue-and-white style of Delftware. Art in America critic Lilly Wei describes Agee's later work as "the mischievous, wonderfully misbegotten offspring of sculpture, painting, objet d'art, and kitschy souvenir."

Ann Agee, Ann Agee, Lake Michigan Bathroom, glazed vitreous china, 108" x 134" x 36", 1992.

Agee has received a Guggenheim Fellowship and awards from Anonymous Was A Woman, and the Louis Comfort Tiffany Foundation, among others. Her work has been collected by institutions including the Brooklyn Museum, Los Angeles County Museum of Art (LACMA), and Philadelphia Museum of Art. She lives and works in Brooklyn, New York.

== Early life and career ==
Agee was born in Philadelphia in 1959. Her mother, Sally Agee, earned an art degree at Syracuse University and exhibited art late in life; her treatment of the home as an ongoing project—rearranging furniture, painting floral designs on bathroom walls or an Abstract Expressionist action-work on the floor—had a strong influence on Ann. Agee studied at the Cooper Union School of Art (BFA, 1981) and Yale School of Art (MFA, 1986) and earned prizes for painting at both. Despite this, she felt stifled by the male-dominated, painting-centric culture at Yale, which conferred presumed status and seriousness on painting over other forms of expression. She turned to work in clay in 1985, drawn by its feel, greater connection to the world, provisional status, and potential as a medium she could lay claim to as a woman.

Agee learned ceramics through experimentation and self-study, aided by grants that allowed her to buy a kiln and produce the work for her first solo show (Ann Nathan Gallery, Chicago, 1991). Fellowships at the Wisconsin-based ceramics manufacturer, Kohler Co., and a plumbing fixture factory in Guanajuato, Mexico from 1991 to 1993 influenced her practice and thought about craft, labor and production and enabled her to pursue large projects, including a hand-painted, ceramic-tile public mural in Guanajuato and her bathroom installation in the "Bad Girls" show.

In the 1990s, Agee expanded her reputation through shows featuring her figurines, at The Fabric Workshop and Museum, New-York Historical Society and Brooklyn Museum, and solo exhibitions at the Arena and Yoshii (New York) and Rena Bransten (San Francisco) galleries. In the 2000s, she was selected for major group exhibitions at LACMA ("Color and Fire: Defining moments in studio ceramics 1950 to 2000"), the Katonah Art Museum ("Conversations in Clay," 2008), Institute of Contemporary Art, Philadelphia and Walker Art Museum ("Dirt on Delight," 2009), and Pennsylvania Academy of Fine Arts ("The Female Gaze," 2013). She has had solo exhibitions at P.P.O.W. Gallery (New York), Locks Gallery (Philadelphia), and Lux Art (California), among others.

Ann Agee, Woman with Camera and Pink Skirt, glazed porcelain, 6.75" height, 1996. Collection of the Rhode Island School of Design Museum.

== Work ==
Agee's art disrupts distinctions between art and craft, the decorative and the utilitarian. She commemorates work, the bodily, and aspects of ordinary life, such as domestic objects, chores, environments and narratives, factory labor and hand-craft, industrial processes, and consumer packaging. Writers and curators suggest her work draws on—and recuperates—decorative arts across several centuries (often discovered from museum study), such as 17th-century, Asian-influenced Delftware, 18th-century Meissen figurines and French textiles, and Rococo ornamentation, as well as modernist and Pop art appropriation and industrial ceramic techniques.

Agee engages these traditions and materials with an irreverent, feminist stance that incorporates her personal experience, particularly around work and gender issues, such as the juggling of artist, mother, homemaker and producer roles, the division of labor, and the conceptualizing of craft skill in relation to art. Agee's main areas of production are ceramic installations, objects, figurines and tableaux, hand-painted "wallpaper drawings," and expansive installations that feature combinations of each of those types of work.

=== Early ceramic installations and objects ===
Lake Michigan Bathroom (1994), a lavishly ornamented, functional bathroom (sink, toilet, bidet, urinal and water fountain) created at Kohler, brought Agee her first major attention through the "Bad Girls" exhibition. Its hand-made fixtures and back-wall mosaic tiles feature ornate patterns, diagrams and images delicately rendered in the blue-and-white style of Delftware. The imagery offers what Metropolis calls, "a Rabelaisian tour" of the flows of the water supply through cities, factories and home, connecting the body, public and private functions, and the architectural and anatomical. Agee's other, early large-scale ceramic works include a 21' by 10' ceramic-tile mural immortalizing Kohler factory workers (1991–2) and the full bathroom, Sheboygan Men’s Room (1998), commissioned by the Kohler Arts Center.

After her move to New York in 1993, Agee turned to smaller-scale work. This work includes porcelain, tchotchke-like objects, styled with chinoiserie patterns of birds, flowers and butterflies, which on closer inspection are revealed to be sex toys. Her Arena Gallery solo show (1995) paid tribute to everyday life, work and anonymous craftsmanship through ornate platters featuring factory workers and tile murals depicting placid suburban and factory scenes, framed by lush, decorative motifs.

=== Figurines ===
With the show "Quotidian" (1996, Yoshii Gallery), Agee turned another older idiom—ceramic figurines—to new uses; she paired them with hand-painted wallpapers, a combination she would pursue over the next two decades. The figurine genre originated in 17th-century Italian customs gracing wealthy desert tables with figurative tableaux made of sugar, which then evolved into Rococo commedia dell'arte and Meissen porcelain figures. Agee pastiched them with hand-sculpted figures of carefully observed, conspicuously contemporary, lively Manhattanites. Writer Maureen Sherlock calls the show "a tender catalogue of the unique phrasing and nuanced dressing of the battalions of women in the street" articulating the partial triumphs, daily struggles, and inventiveness of everyday life; Dominique Nahas writes that each figure suggests its own world "with an almost Baudelairean concern with individuality of expression," which he compares to the observational Ashcan School paintings of John Sloan and George Bellows. Agee's figurines were selected for Brooklyn Museum and other exhibitions and commissioned for a six-page New York Times Magazine feature/fashion spread in 1999.

Agee next placed her figurines in multi-figure narrative tableaux, whose expressive postures, gestures and facial features portrayed ordinary rites of passage, manual labor, and domestic scenarios. Her 2001 solo show at P.P.O.W. presented five birth-focused sculptural tableaux, including Birth Class, which features colorfully dressed, slightly giddy pregnant women and partners watching a couple and a midwife give a demonstration. Boxing in the Kitchen (2005) consists of a surreal pink landscape set on a custom, twelve-foot-long table and populated with meticulously painted terra cotta figurines acting out domestic fantasies of play and transformation: women boxing, a man impersonating Don Giovanni, an acrobat, a father reading to children.

Ann Agee, Agee Manufacturing Co., glazed porcelain, painted wood, 55" x 108" x 60", 2009. Installation, Walker Art Center, Minneapolis, MN.

In the later 2000s, Agee's ceramic work increasingly turned to fanciful figurines, rococo-like statuary and domestic objects—dishes, platters, vases, sinks—that toy with notions of functionality through purposeful imperfections. Artforum compares the dense, decorative layered imagery on the vases to the Surrealist "refraction of the unconscious and the everyday"; Lilly Wei describes the figurines as "earthy, lively, both sardonic and goofily sweet, updated commedia dell'arte types"; This work—often solid white and appearing silhouette-like against bright, hand-painted wallpapers—is frequently produced and replicated under the auspices of "Agee Manufacturing Co." (complete with stamps like those on Kohler Co. products). The home-industry concept places Agee in the roles of worker, shop boss, owner and shopkeeper, opening a conversation touching on class, the dignity of labor and craft, feminism, capitalism and modern family life. In 2018, she exhibited her "Handwarmers," a series of more than 200 small shoe-like and abstract forms based on ceramic Italian hand warmers, in a boutique-like display.

=== Wallpapers and later installations ===
Agee's later exhibitions and installations offer diverse displays of ceramic figurines, domestic objects and pieces of furniture, set against hand-painted and stenciled, large-scale "wallpaper drawings" on Thai mulberry paper. Rather than imitate expensive materials as traditional wallpaper designs do, Agee's wallpapers celebrate everyday spaces and accessible, richly patterned commercial products as objects of interest, much like the early work of Warhol or the interiors of Matisse and Roy Lichtenstein do; they often comment pointedly on work, domestic life, gender and class, material culture, and museum display.

Ann Agee, Kitchen, acrylic on mulberry paper, 120” x 185” x 3”, 2005.

Agee first exhibited wallpaper drawings in her "Quotidian" show (1996), re-appropriating inexpensive fabrics and bits of household product labels that she painstakingly painted in floral-like motifs on long scrolls (e.g., Jello Yellow Calico, 1995). In their repetition and fragmentation, her wallpaper drawings suggest mass production and modernist collage, yet subvert both with what Maureen Sherlock calls their "Flatbush funky, homegrown American Pop," hand-painted technique.

Agee's "Rules of the Pattern" (2010) and "The Kitchen Sink" (2012) exhibitions at Lock Gallery both combine brightly colored "wallpapers" depicting views of rooms in Agee's home, along with fanciful hand-crafted bowls and platters mounted on steel armatures and displays of vases, figurines and objects, suggesting sly reconstructions of her Brooklyn apartment as a site of both domesticity and production. Artforum describes the latter show as an "inquiry into the repression of the inner self and the packaging of the social self" that lays bare "unspoken fears and taboos."

In the installation Super Imposition (2010), Agee replicated stenciling and patterns from the Philadelphia Museum of Art's Georgian-style Lansdowne Room, which she then hung on the walls of its rustic, Colonial Millbach Kitchen, while displaying her vases on the room's furniture. For "Playing House" (2012, Brooklyn Museum), she used her hand-stenciled wallpapers to similarly transform a 19th-century domestic library and parlor into an Agee Manufacturing showroom.

"Domestic Translations" (P.P.O.W., 2015) represented perhaps her most wide-ranging installation, offering vibrant interiors and abstract wallpaper drawings, porcelain penis perfume bottles doubling as necklaces, an updated, porcelain Lake Michigan Bathroom (III), abstract stoneware sculptural towers of intersecting planes cut through with cylinders and cups, and appropriations through the lens of travel. The New Yorker called it "a thoroughly winning but overstuffed show," adding its "excessive production has feminist overtones—think of it as a portrait of having it all."

== Awards and collections ==
Agee has been recognized with a John S. Guggenheim Fellowship (2011), awards from Anonymous Was A Woman (2012), the Louis Comfort Tiffany Foundation (1997) and New York Foundation for the Arts (1997), grants from the National Endowment for the Arts (1993, 1992, 1989), Wisconsin Arts Board (1992) and Empire State Craft Alliance (1990), and a Kohler Arts Center fellowship (1991–2), among others.

Her work belongs to the collections of the Brooklyn Museum, LACMA, Philadelphia Museum of Art, New-York Historical Society, Chazen Museum of Art, Henry Art Gallery, Kohler Arts Center, Museum of Contemporary Art, North Miami, Museum of Sex, Pennsylvania Academy of Fine Arts, and Rhode Island School of Design Museum.
