= Guerrilla Girls On Tour =

Touring theatre company

Guerrilla Girls On Tour is an anonymous touring theatre company whose mission is to develop activist plays, performance art and street theatre addressing feminism and women's history. Formed when the original Guerrilla Girls split into three separate groups in 2001, Guerrilla Girls On Tour has performed in 17 countries and 39 US states with "Feminists Are Funny," "If You Can Stand the Heat: The History of Women and Food," "Silence Is Violence" and "The History of Women in Theatre, Condensed".

== History ==
Guerrilla Girls On Tour is one of the three groups that formed when the original Guerrilla Girls split in 2001. The other two groups are Guerrilla Girls, Inc., and Guerrilla GirlsBroadBand. Since their formation Guerrilla Girls On Tour have developed a unique feminist performance technique that incorporates skits, sketch, improvisation, dance, parody and vaudeville to address sexism, pay equity, body image, the beauty industry and the "F" word, among other issues. Their feminist theatre technique relies heavily on audience participation and interactivity and might involve their audiences in writing assignments, sing-a-longs and on stage participation. In common with the other Guerrilla Girls groups, Guerrilla Girls on Tour deploys pseudonyms and gorilla masks in an attempt to anonymize artistic production and divorce value from ego.

Like the original Guerrilla Girls, founded in 1985, each member of Guerrilla Girls On Tour performs using the name of a dead female artist and wears a gorilla mask to conceal her true identity, operating as a collective entity. Their company is made up of approximately 20 to 30 members of women actors, directors, designers, producers, directors and theatre administrators. Guerrilla Girls On Tour have been featured in the Village Voice, Backstage, Mother Jones, The New York Times, CUNY TV's Women In Theatre Series, i-D Magazine, American Theatre, Antiborder Conference Warsaw, LA Times, In Theatre, the BBC, French Channel 2, amNewYork, Wysokie Obcasy, and the Tony Awards.

== Tours ==
Guerrilla Girls On Tour currently tours 4 performances: Feminists Are Funny, Silence Is Violence, The History of Women in Theatre: Condensed and If You Can Stand The Heat: The History Of Women And Food.

Feminists Are Funny is an energetic romp through humorous historical moments in feminist history as well as the history of Guerrilla Girls On Tour. The show provides an overview of GGOT's posters, street theatre actions, and excerpts from the current comedies in repertoire. Feminists Are Funny addresses the lack of parity for women in global theatre, political issues facing women such as reproductive rights, the war in Iraq, current number of women elected to government, sex trafficking and violence against women....all in a fast paced comedy. Guerrilla Girls On Tour briefly research each place they visit and include current local issues and statistics on the state of the arts for women in every city they perform in.

Silence Is Violence contains similar material to Feminists Are Funny but includes a 30-minute section on up-to-date statistics and strategies for combating violence against women. Guerrilla Girls On Tour dramatize a series of date rape situations and educate the audience with information on how to set boundaries and avoid potentially dangerous situations. The entire show is both upbeat and empowering. Local and statewide stats regarding violence against women are incorporated into each performance making them site-specific.

The History of Women In Theatre: Condensed is the recovered herstory of women in world theatre in 90 minutes revealing the work of some of the most prolific yet unknown women of the modern theatre.

If You Can Stand the Heat: The History of Women and Food explores women's relationship to food. In Part I: "PIE" – celebrated food writer M.F.K. Fisher takes us on a 10-minute musical romp though the history of women and food while baking her favorite apple pie. In Part II "CAKE" – Southern cooking expert Edna Lewis polls the audience in an exercise that unleashes female obsession/anxiety over body image. And in Part III "BREAD" culinary heroine Julia Child explores global food supply and nutrition as well as women as both homemakers and breadwinners while baking a French baguette.

Exhibitions of Guerrilla Girls On Tour's posters have been organized at museums in the US, and at Zendai MoMA, China; Portobello Film Festival, UK and the Busan Biennale in South Korea. The Guerrilla Girls On Tour's web site contains all of their visual works as well as their annual Girlcott List (a list of theatres across the US that do not include plays by women in their mainstage seasons) and the annual Good News List (where to find plays by women). Their portfolio has been collected by museums and art collectors such as the Linda Lee Alter Collection of Art by Women, Pennsylvania Academy of the Fine Arts and the National Gallery of Canada.

== Website ==
Guerrilla Girls On Tour! maintain a website, which contains their performances, street actions and exhibitions as well as an account of their history and tactics. This is also where they can be reached to arrange appearances.
