= Susan Silas =

American visual artist

Susan Silas is a visual artist working primarily in video, sculpture and photography. Her work, through self-portraiture, examines the meaning of embodiment, the index in representation, and the evolution of our understanding of the self. She is interested in the aging body, gender roles, the fragility of sentient being and the potential outcome of the creation of idealized selves through bio-technology and artificial intelligence.

== Education and early career ==
Silas received her BA in history from Reed College and her Master's in Fine Arts from California Institute of the Arts.

After completing her graduate studies in 1983, she moved from Los Angeles back to New York. Soon afterwards, she began exhibiting her work in group exhibitions including White Columns, New York; New Langton Arts, San Francisco; Margo Leavin Gallery, Los Angeles; Cal Arts: Skeptical Belief(s); The Renaissance Society, Chicago; Girls Night Out; Femininity as Masquerade, The New Museum of Contemporary Art, New York; and Bridges and Boundaries, the Jewish Museum, New York. In 1990, Silas had her first solo exhibition, at fiction/nonfiction in New York. This exhibition was followed in 1991 by a solo exhibition in Paris at Galerie Antoine Candau.

== Work on landscape and "Holocaust Postmemory" ==
Starting in the late 1990s, Silas's work focused on landscape and memory. In 1997, she began working on Helmbrechts walk, 1998-2003, a project in which she retraced the steps of an historical death march of all women that took place at the close of the Second World War, walking for 22 days and 225 miles in Eastern Europe. This work found several forms: an unbound 48-plate artist book, a video installation, and a slide projection. It has been discussed in the chapter on her work in the book Memory Effects: The Holocaust and the Art of Secondary Witnessing by Dora Apel, and was the subject of an interview with her for a broadcast on BBC radio and ArtonAir.org. In November 2005 this work, along with a video installation were the subject of a solo exhibition at the Koffler Gallery in Toronto, accompanied by an essay on her work by the scholar Brett Ashley Kaplan. Helmbrechts walk, 1998-2003 was exhibited at Hebrew Union College Museum in New York City from September 2009 to June 2010, and then traveled in an English/German edition to Kunstverein Grafschaft Bentheim in Neuenhaus, Germany in the summer of 2010 and to Kunsthalle Exnergasse in Vienna that fall. In 2011 this work was included in the exhibition Continuity at the Center for Contemporary Arts, Celje, Slovenia, curated by Irena Cercnik. A fuller consideration of this work was published in Landscapes of Holocaust Postmemory by Brett Ashley Kaplan. Other recent works include a four-screen video installation of the four Nazi death camps in German-occupied Poland, Untitled (11–14 May 1998), shown in February, 2001 at the Cooley Memorial Gallery in Portland, Oregon and a sound work on CD exhibited at the Staller Center at Stony Brook. The artist's most recent work on the Shoah is a six-channel video installation titled Treblinka Song and The Happy Wanderer.

== Recent work ==
In the 2010s, Silas exhibited work consisting of an ongoing study of decaying birds.

"To put it in terms reflective of Silas's photographic process and subject, Silas had to find the entropy that would hold us enrapt, keep us from turning away. Here there is no contest. Of all animals, none preserve the beauty and dignity of death with a grandeur and longevity approaching that of the many species of birds." – G. Roger Denson (excerpted from "On The Resurrection of Dead Birds")

A selection from this body of work entitled eyes wide shut, 2010, was exhibited in a solo exhibition at CB1 Gallery in Los Angeles, California from April 9 to May 14, 2011, along with the premiere of the video performance A child of sixties television singing songs that got stuck in her head. Images from the series RAVEN were exhibited at CB1 Gallery in September, 2013.

In March 2014, Silas's photo collections love in the ruins; sex over 50 and the self-portrait sessions were exhibited in Bushwick, New York. In December 2015, during Art Basel Miami, the artist realized a billboard “The Wilderness Watches Over Us in Miami”, on I-195 in the Design District, sponsored by the Knight Foundation and AIRIE (Artists in Residence in the Everglades). New work in the series the self-portrait sessions, including photographs, video, and sculpture, were exhibited at CB1 Gallery in June 2016.

Silas's work love in the ruins; sex over 50 was included in the group exhibition IN THE CUT - The Male Body in Feminist Art, curated by Andrea Jahn, at Stadtgalerie Saarbrücken in Saarbrücken, Germany. The exhibition ran from May 5, 2018, to January 13, 2019. The exhibition catalogue, IN THE CUT: The Male Body in Feminist Art, was published in 2019.

== Post-photography/digital sculpture ==
Silas's recent sculptural, photographic and motion capture video works are self-portraiture created via photogrammetry. They retain an element of the indexical (referring to the artist being photographed) as well as an obvious iconic value (their likeness to the artist). To carve the sculpture, information obtained via this photographic process must be translated into data in the form of an object file and then reprogrammed into software that recognizes the information as a model to be milled by a high-precision anthropomorphic robot. This process, while completely data-driven, does retain a ghost of the index. The data is reverse-engineered back into a material likeness easily recognizable as the artist. The same object file used to create the sculpture can be put into 3D software and photographed as if it were a model, generating a set of 2D self-portraits, whose iconic value (resemblance) remains intact, while its function as an index (what exactly it is referring to: the artist in the photogrammetry rig, the physical sculpture, the data file), becomes less certain. As such, these sculptures, photographic portraits and videos straddle the line between digital photography (an indexical component) and post-photography or simulation technology, living in an ambiguous interstitial space.

Her first digital sculpture, AGING VENUS, 2018, was shown in the exhibition Out of Body: Sculpture Post-Photography, co-curated by Claudia Hart and Susan Silas with Stephanie Dinkins, Claudia Hart, Carla Gannis, Sophie Kahn and Susan Silas at bitforms gallery in 2018. The sculpture then traveled to Wasserman Projects in Detroit for the group exhibition Portray, curated by Alison Wong.

== Publications ==
Silas has written featured articles for the online magazines ArtNet and Hyperallergic. She has been published in Podium, the online literary magazine of the 92nd Street Y in New York City; on channel 13's website REEL 13; in the literary magazine Exquisite Corpse; in cultureID; in the "Modern Love" column in the Sunday New York Times; and most recently on the blog of the Theo Westernberger estate. She is a regular contributor to Hyperallergic and the co-editor of the artblog MOMMY. Her books include eyes wide shut, published by Horned Screamer Press; and TO SELVES: Joy Episalla and Susan Silas, published by 2 Works Press. Interviews with the artist can be found in ADULT magazine, Digital Dying, Museum of Non Visible Art at Yale University Radio, and "Ms. Represent: Behind the Face, a Fierce Woman" at Rabble magazine.

== Selected bibliography ==
- Marcin, Nadja Verena 150 Phalluses in Feminist Art Today, Hypergallergic, August 22, 2018
- Takac, Balasz What About the Male Body in Feminist Art? An Exhibition Examines, Widewalls, May 23, 2018
- Vartanian, Hrag, Required Reading, Hyperallergic, December 6, 2015
- D’Agostino, Paul, Sexed & Gendered & Not: Four NYC Artists, The L Magazine, February 11, 2015
- Sendyka, Roma, A Journey, the Pain of Others, and Historical Experience: Susan Silas (English version) RIHA Journal Special Issue: Contemporary Art and Memory, December 31, 2014
- Micchelli, Thomas, The Pursuit of Art, 2014 December 27, 2014
- Lockemann, Bettina, The Power of Place: Photographing the Holocaust Today, Helsinki Photomedia, 2014
- Tschida, Anne, Art in the Everglades, Biscayne Times, July 7, 2014
- Somogyi, Zsófia, Susan Silas: Helmbrechts walk (In Hungarian) YouTube, 2014
- Thiessen-Schneider, Gudrun, 20 Jahre, Kunstverein Grafschaft Bentheim, 2014
- Petry, Michael ed., Nature Morte: Contemporary Artists Reinvigorate the Still Life Tradition, Thames and Hudson, 2013
- Edmiston, J.Harry ed. Susan Silas, Heist. Photography-Collective, April, 2014.
- Schwendener, Martha, A Critic’s Picks in Brooklyn, an Embattled Utopia, the New York Times, April 3, 2014.
- Micchelli, Thomas, Everlasting Love: Susan Silas’s Intimate Photographs, Hyperallergic, March 15, 2014.
- Blazekovic, Norelkys ed., Airie, IRREVERSIBLE ART BASEL MIAMI WEEK, 2013.
- Wagley, Catherine, Susan Silas: In The Studio, ArtVoices, Summer Issue, 2013.
- Borș, Sabin ed. Susan Silas: the self-portrait sessions, Anti-Utopias, Summer, 2013.
- Steinhauer, Jillian, The Women of Miami Project, Hyperallergic, December 8, 2012.
- Somogyi, Zsofia, A halál elótt és után, Fotómúvészet, December 2011
- Susan Silas’ Heroic Living, Hungry Hyaena, 16 May 2010.
- I Love Susan Silas, Charlie Finch, ArtNet Magazine, August, 2009.
- "We are all witnesses": Susan Silas's Helmbrechts walk Erin Hanas, Montage, 2009.
- Exposing violence, amnesia, and the fascist forest through Susan Silas and Collier Schorr's Holocaust Art, Brett Ashley Kaplan, Images, vol 2, number 1, 2008. Brill publishing.
- Camera Austria
