= Millie Wilson =

American artist and teacher

Millie Wilson (born 1948 in Hot Springs, Arkansas) is an artist and teacher who lives and works in Austin, Texas. Wilson was a member of the faculty in the Program in Art at The California Institute of the Arts from 1985 to 2014.

Wilson's practice encompasses a variety of media and incorporates Modernist and Minimalist traditions alongside postmodern strategies that use humor, parody and recontextualized objects and imagery to question stereotypes and conventional ideas involving sexuality and gender identity. The Hammer Museum catalogue for the 2000 COLA show describes her Work as "characterized by [a] shrewd appropriation and tweaking of high- and low- cultural icons to create lesbian subtexts." Her 2013 solo exhibition at Maloney Fine Art presented vernacular, found photographs in small light boxes, whose multiple readings arise from formal qualities, and juxtaposed everyday gestures and situations. She describes that work as “unfinished inventories of fragments, improvisational sites where the constructed and the readymade are used to question our making of the world through systems of language, knowledge, things and information”.

Wilson graduated from the University of Texas at Austin in 1971 with a Bachelor of Fine Arts and later attended the University of Houston, graduating with a Masters of Fine Arts in 1983. Select exhibition venues include the Whitney Museum of American Art, Matthew Marks Gallery, Maloney Fine Art, New Museum, White Columns, Walker Art Center, Carnegie Museum of Art, SITE Santa Fe, San Francisco Museum of Modern Art, Santa Monica Museum of Art, Orange County Museum of Art, the UCLA Hammer Museum, Los Angeles Contemporary Exhibitions and the Palm Springs Art Museum. Group exhibitions featuring Wilson have included Parallels and Intersections at the San Jose Museum of Art, C.O.L.A. 2000 at the UCLA Hammer Museum and Fact and Fiction at the San Francisco Museum of Modern Art.

Wilson has received numerous grants, including an NEA Visual Artists Fellowship, a Pollock-Krasner Foundation Fellowship, City of Los Angeles Artist Grant, California Arts Council Fellowship, Art Matters, Inc. Grant, and a LACE Artists Projects Grant. She has been published in a variety of contexts, and has taught and lectured throughout the U.S. and Europe.
