= Pat Lasch =

American artist

Pat Lasch (born 1944) is an American conceptual artist, painter, and sculptor.

== Biography ==
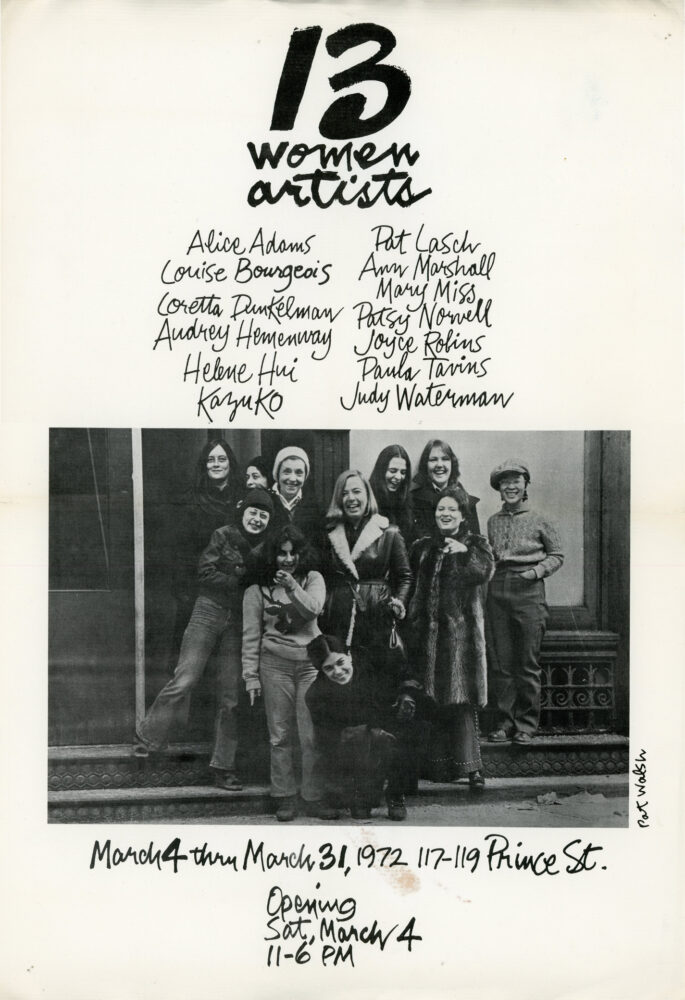
13 women 1972 exhibition poster, created by Lasch

Born in 1944 in New York City, Lasch received her bachelor's degree from Queens College of the City University of New York. Throughout her career she has shown work in exhibitions throughout the United States. Her father was a pastry chef born in Germany, and many of her works feature cakes as a response to his career. Part of the first generation of feminist artists to gain prominence, she is noted for her sculptures which depict ordinary objects, such as ball gowns crafted from dried acrylic paint, created from unusual materials.

A 1988 bronze sculpture by Lasch, Self-Portrait: Renaissance Woman and Her Lover, is owned by the Metropolitan Museum of Art. Her work may also be found in the collections of the Smithsonian American Art Museum and the Museum of Modern Art. The latter museum also once owned a wedding cake sculpture commissioned in 1979 by Kynaston McShine for its fiftieth anniversary, but this was discarded sometime due to irreversible deterioration of its components in the 1990s, a fact which was not disclosed to the artist until 2016.

Journeys of the Heart, exhibited at the Palm Springs Museum in California, surveyed 43 years of work by Pat Lasch. It featured delicate cake and pastry sculptures made from dried acrylic paint and a video of the artist at work.
