= List of Guggenheim Fellowships awarded in 2005 =

One hundred and eighty-six Guggenheim Fellowships were awarded in 2005. Institutional affiliation is listed if applicable.

== U.S. and Canadian Fellows ==
Category	Field of Study	Fellow	Affiliated institution	Ref
Creative Arts	Choreography	Alito Alessi		
Creative Arts	Choreography	David Dorfman	Connecticut College	
Creative Arts	Choreography	Simone Forti	University of California, Los Angeles	
Creative Arts	Choreography	Victoria E. Marks	University of California, Los Angeles	
Creative Arts	Choreography	Christopher Williams	Art Center College of Design	
Creative Arts	Drama and Performance Art	Gina Gionfriddo		
Creative Arts	Drama and Performance Art	Lisa Kron		
Creative Arts	Drama and Performance Art	Lynn Nottage	Yale University	
Creative Arts	Drama and Performance Art	Christopher Shinn	New School University	
Creative Arts	Fiction	David Bezmozgis		
Creative Arts	Fiction	Brooks Hansen		
Creative Arts	Fiction	Adam Haslett		
Creative Arts	Fiction	Rohinton Mistry		
Creative Arts	Fiction	Han Ong		
Creative Arts	Fiction	ZZ Packer	California College of the Arts	
Creative Arts	Fiction	Jim Shepard	Williams College	
Creative Arts	Fiction	Mark Slouka	Columbia University	
Creative Arts	Film	Anne Aghion		
Creative Arts	Film	Michael Almereyda	Warren Wilson College	
Creative Arts	Film	David Gatten	Ithaca College	
Creative Arts	Film	Sam Green	University of San Francisco	
Creative Arts	Film	Bill Lichtenstein		
Creative Arts	Film	Kimi Takesue		
Creative Arts	Fine Arts	Chakaia Booker		
Creative Arts	Fine Arts	Julie Bozzi		
Creative Arts	Fine Arts	Bruce Chao	Rhode Island School of Design	
Creative Arts	Fine Arts	Bonnie Collura	Rhode Island School of Design, University of the Arts	
Creative Arts	Fine Arts	Vincent Fecteau		
Creative Arts	Fine Arts	Beverly Fishman	Cranbrook Academy of Art	
Creative Arts	Fine Arts	David Gloman	Amherst College	
Creative Arts	Fine Arts	Joseph Grigely	School of the Art Institute of Chicago	
Creative Arts	Fine Arts	Mamie Holst		
Creative Arts	Fine Arts	Eric Hongisto	Montana State University	
Creative Arts	Fine Arts	C. Stanley Lewis	New York Studio School, Chautauqua School of Painting	
Creative Arts	Fine Arts	Nicholas Micros		
Creative Arts	Fine Arts	Diana Thater	Art Center College of Design	
Creative Arts	Fine Arts	Elaine Reichek		
Creative Arts	Fine Arts	Judith Schaechter	University of the Arts	
Creative Arts	Fine Arts	Katherine Sherwood	University of California, Berkeley	
Creative Arts	Fine Arts	Paul Sietsema		
Creative Arts	Music Composition	Susan Botti	University of Michigan	
Creative Arts	Music Composition	Marilyn Crispell		
Creative Arts	Music Composition	Brian Current		
Creative Arts	Music Composition	Dave Douglas		
Creative Arts	Music Composition	Don Freund	Indiana University	
Creative Arts	Music Composition	Yotam Haber		
Creative Arts	Music Composition	Jake Heggie		
Creative Arts	Music Composition	Andrew Waggoner	Syracuse University	
Creative Arts	Music Composition	Mark Wingate	Florida State University	
Creative Arts	Music Composition	Louis Rosen		
Creative Arts	Photography	Debbie Fleming Caffery		
Creative Arts	Photography	Stanley Greenberg		
Creative Arts	Photography	Jin Lee	Illinois State University	
Creative Arts	Photography	Sze Tsung Leong		
Creative Arts	Photography	Christine Osinski	Cooper Union for the Advancement of Science and Art	
Creative Arts	Photography	William Wylie	University of Virginia	
Creative Arts	Poetry	Kim Addonizio		
Creative Arts	Poetry	Sarah Arvio	United Nations	
Creative Arts	Poetry	Marianne Boruch	Purdue University	
Creative Arts	Poetry	Henri Cole	Bennington College	
Creative Arts	Poetry	Tory Dent		
Creative Arts	Poetry	Peter Gizzi	University of Massachusetts Amherst	
Creative Arts	Poetry	Harryette Mullen	University of California, Los Angeles	
Creative Arts	Poetry	William Olsen	Western Michigan University	
Creative Arts	Poetry	Spencer Reece		
Creative Arts	Poetry	Philip Schultz		
Creative Arts	Video and Audio	Sadie T. Benning		
Creative Arts	Video and Audio	Tricia McLaughlin	State University of New York College at Old Westbury, Hunter College, City University of New York	
Creative Arts	Video and Audio	Julia Scher	Cooper Union for the Advancement of Science and Art	
Creative Arts	Video and Audio	Shelly Silver	School of Visual Arts, Cooper Union for the Advancement of Science and Art	
Humanities	African Studies	Dorothy L. Hodgson	Rutgers University	
Humanities	American Literature	Arnold Krupat	Sarah Lawrence College	
Humanities	American Literature	Valerie Smith	Princeton University	
Humanities	Architecture, Planning, and Design	Paul Spencer Byard	Columbia University	
Humanities	Architecture, Planning, and Design	John Abel Pinto	Princeton University	
Humanities	Bibliography	Alison Frazier	University of Texas at Austin	
Humanities	Biography	Blake Bailey		
Humanities	British History	Susan Pedersen	Columbia University	
Humanities	British History	Martin Wiener	Rice University	
Humanities	Classics	Daniel Mendelsohn		
Humanities	Dance Studies	Remy Charlip		
Humanities	Economic History	Gary R. Saxonhouse		
Humanities	English Literature	Jenny Davidson	Columbia University	
Humanities	English Literature	Theresa M. Kelley	University of Wisconsin-Madison	
Humanities	Film, Video and Radio Studies	John Belton	Rutgers University	
Humanities	Fine Art Studies	Maud Lavin	School of the Art Institute of Chicago	
Humanities	Fine Art Studies	Tryna Lyons	Zayed University, University of Washington	
Humanities	Fine Art Studies	Natasha Staller	Amherst College	
Humanities	Fine Art Studies	Eugene Y. Wang	Harvard University	
Humanities	Folklore and Popular Culture	Donald J. Cosentino	University of California, Los Angeles	
Humanities	Folklore and Popular Culture	Dale A. Olsen	Florida State University	
Humanities	French History	Steven Englund		
Humanities	French History	Philip Nord	Princeton University	
Humanities	French Literature	Richard E. Goodkin	University of Wisconsin-Madison	
Humanities	General Nonfiction	Mark Abley		
Humanities	General Nonfiction	Jo Ann Beard		
Humanities	General Nonfiction	John Elder	Middlebury College	
Humanities	General Nonfiction	Fanny Howe	University of California, San Diego, Kenyon College	
Humanities	General Nonfiction	Pico Iyer		
Humanities	General Nonfiction	Anne Nelson	Columbia University	
Humanities	General Nonfiction	David Shields	University of Washington	
Humanities	General Nonfiction	Peter Turchi		
Humanities	German and East European History	Claudia Koonz	Duke University	
Humanities	German and East European History	David Sorkin	University of Wisconsin–Madison	
Humanities	History of Science and Technology	Iain A. Boal		
Humanities	History of Science and Technology	Alexander Jones	University of Toronto	
Humanities	History of Science and Technology	Ruth Rogaski	Vanderbilt University	
Humanities	Iberian and Latin American History	Janice E. Perlman	Columbia University, World Bank	
Humanities	Intellectual and Cultural History	Mark Edmundson	University of Virginia	
Humanities	Intellectual and Cultural History	Christopher Lane	Northwestern University	
Humanities	Italian Literature	Geoffrey Brock		
Humanities	Italian Literature	Victoria Kirkham	University of Pennsylvania	
Humanities	Latin American Literature	Diana Taylor	New York University	
Humanities	Linguistics	James R. Dow	Iowa State University	
Humanities	Linguistics	John Huehnergard	Harvard University	
Humanities	Linguistics	Judith Irvine	University of Michigan	
Humanities	Literary Criticism	Leonard Barkan	Princeton University	
Humanities	Medieval History	Sharon Ann Farmer	University of California, Santa Barbara	
Humanities	Medieval Literature	D. Vance Smith	Princeton University	
Humanities	Music Research	Ned Sublette	Tulane University	
Humanities	Near Eastern Studies	Gerhard Böwering	Yale University	
Humanities	Near Eastern Studies	Ian Hodder	Stanford University	
Humanities	Near Eastern Studies	Niek Veldhuis	University of California, Berkeley	
Humanities	Philosophy	Eckart Förster	Johns Hopkins University	
Humanities	Photography Studies	Deborah Willis	New York University	
Humanities	Religion	Ronald M. Green	Dartmouth College	
Humanities	Religion	Maria Heim	Amherst College	
Humanities	Religion	Sally M. Promey	University of Maryland, College Park	
Humanities	Russian History	Adeeb Khalid	Carleton College	
Humanities	Russian History	Donald J. Raleigh	University of North Carolina at Chapel Hill	
Humanities	Science Writing	John Fleischman	American Society for Cell Biology	
Humanities	Science Writing	Jennifer Price		
Humanities	Spanish and Portuguese Literature	Fernando Arenas	University of Minnesota	
Humanities	Theatre Arts	Rhonda K. Garelick	Connecticut College	
Humanities	United States History	Elizabeth A. Fenn	Duke University	
Humanities	United States History	Piero Gleijeses	Johns Hopkins	
Humanities	United States History	Michael Grossberg	Indiana University Bloomington	
Humanities	United States History	Thomas J. Sugrue	University of Pennsylvania	
Natural Sciences	Astronomy and Astrophysics	Glenn D. Starkman		
Natural Sciences	Astronomy and Astrophysics	Meenakshi Wadhwa	Field Museum	
Natural Sciences	Chemistry	Sabre Kais	Purdue University	
Natural Sciences	Chemistry	Margaret A. Tolbert	University of Colorado Boulder	
Natural Sciences	Chemistry	John C. Tully	Yale University	
Natural Sciences	Chemistry	Lai-Sheng Wang	Washington State University	
Natural Sciences	Computer Science	Madhu Sudan	Massachusetts Institute of Technology	
Natural Sciences	Computer Science	Moshe Y. Vardi	Rice University	
Natural Sciences	Computer Science	Santosh Srinivas Vempala	Massachusetts Institute of Technology	
Natural Sciences	Earth Science	Mark Ellis	University of Washington	
Natural Sciences	Earth Science	Jonathan T. Overpeck	University of Arizona	
Natural Sciences	Engineering	Long-Qing Chen	Pennsylvania State University	
Natural Sciences	Engineering	William A. Curtin, Jr.	Brown University	
Natural Sciences	Engineering	Yannis G. Kevrekidis	Princeton University	
Natural Sciences	Engineering	J. M. (Jimmy) Xu	Brown University	
Natural Sciences	Geography and Environmental Science	Steven M. Gorelick	Stanford University	
Natural Sciences	Geography and Environmental Science	Richard Harris	McMaster University	
Natural Sciences	Geography and Environmental Science	Bruce L. Rhoads	University of Illinois at Urbana–Champaign	
Natural Sciences	Mathematics	Ian Agol	University of Illinois at Chicago	
Natural Sciences	Mathematics	David R. Morrison	Duke University	
Natural Sciences	Mathematics	Christopher D. Sogge	Johns Hopkins University	
Natural Sciences	Medicine and Health	M. Gregg Bloche	Georgetown University, Johns Hopkins University	
Natural Sciences	Medicine and Health	Guohua Li	Johns Hopkins University	
Natural Sciences	Molecular and Cellular Biology	Jeffrey D. Palmer	Indiana University Bloomington	
Natural Sciences	Molecular and Cellular Biology	Lynne Regan	Yale University	
Natural Sciences	Neuroscience	Marc D. Hauser	Harvard University	
Natural Sciences	Neuroscience	Carl O. Pabo	Stanford University	
Natural Sciences	Organismic Biology and Ecology	David A. Burney	National Tropical Botanical Garden	
Natural Sciences	Organismic Biology and Ecology	Jonathan B. Losos	Washington University in St. Louis	
Natural Sciences	Organismic Biology and Ecology	Trevor Price	University of Chicago	
Natural Sciences	Physics	Patricia R. Burchat	Stanford University	
Natural Sciences	Physics	Woowon Kang	University of Chicago	
Natural Sciences	Plant Science	Michael J. Balick	New York Botanical Garden	
Natural Sciences	Plant Science	Lynda F. Delph	Indiana University	
Social Sciences	Anthropology and Cultural Studies	Vincent Crapanzano	CUNY Graduate Center	
Social Sciences	Anthropology and Cultural Studies	Susan Ossman	Rice University	
Social Sciences	Economics	Matthew O. Jackson	California Institute of Technology	
Social Sciences	Economics	Stephen Morris	Yale University	
Social Sciences	Law	Gerald J. Postema	University of North Carolina at Chapel Hill	
Social Sciences	Political Science	Martha Crenshaw	Wesleyan University	
Social Sciences	Political Science	Linda L. Fowler	Dartmouth College	
Social Sciences	Political Science	Peter Gourevitch	University of California, San Diego	
Social Sciences	Psychology	Kent C. Berridge	University of Michigan	
Social Sciences	Psychology	Paul L. Harris	Harvard University	
Social Sciences	Psychology	John A. Lucy	University of Chicago	
Social Sciences	Psychology	Drazen Prelec	MIT Sloan School of Management	
Social Sciences	Sociology	Andrew Cherlin	Johns Hopkins University	
Social Sciences	Sociology	Bruce Western	Princeton University	

== Latin American and Caribbean Fellows ==
Category	Field of Study	Fellow	Affiliated institution	Ref
Creative Arts	Fiction	Manlio Argueta	National Library of El Salvador	
Creative Arts	Fiction	Roberto Raschella		
Creative Arts	Film	Eliseo Subiela		
Creative Arts	Fine Arts	Arturo Herrera		
Creative Arts	Fine Arts	Cristóbal Lehyt		
Creative Arts	Fine Arts	Wilfredo Prieto		
Creative Arts	Music Composition	Jocy de Oliveira		
Creative Arts	Music Composition	Martín Matalon		
Creative Arts	Poetry	Hugo Padeletti		
Creative Arts	Video and Audio	Andrea Juan	National University of Tres de Febrero	
Humanities	Fine Arts Research	José Manuel Valenzuela Arce		
Humanities	General Nonfiction	Jaime Luis Huenún		
Humanities	Iberian and Latin American History	Brian Connaughton	Universidad Autónoma Metropolitana	
Humanities	Iberian and Latin American History	Luis Alberto Romero	National Research Council of Argentina	
Humanities	Latin American Literature	Josep M. Barnadas	Center for Advanced Bolivian Studies	
Humanities	Latin American Literature	Gonzalo Moisés Aguilar		
Humanities	Linguistics	Lucía A. Golluscio	University of Buenos Aires, National Research Council of Argentina	
Humanities	Linguistics	Marisa Malvestitti	National University of La Pampa	
Humanities	Music Research	Raul R. Romero	Greater National University of San Marcos	
Humanities	Philosophy	Rodolfo Darío Vázquez Cardozo	Autonomous Technical Institute of Mexico	
Humanities	Theatre Arts	Todd Gulick		
Natural Sciences	Astronomy and Astrophysics	Dante Minniti	Pontifical Catholic University of Chile	
Natural Sciences	Earth Science	Gino Casassa	Center for Scientific Studies	
Natural Sciences	Mathematics	Florian Luca	National Autonomous University of Mexico	
Natural Sciences	Medicine and Health	Mauro Martins Teixeira	Federal University of Minas Gerais	
Natural Sciences	Molecular and Cellular Biology	Carlos Frederico Martins Menck	University of São Paulo	
Natural Sciences	Neuroscience	Cecilia Bouzat	National Research Council of Argentina, National University of the South	
Natural Sciences	Neuroscience	Andrés E. Carrasco	National Research Council of Argentina	
Natural Sciences	Organismic Biology and Ecology	Gerardo Ceballos	National Autonomous University of Mexico	
Natural Sciences	Physics	Karen Hallberg	National Research Council of Argentina, Centro Atomico Bariloche, Balseiro Institute	
Natural Sciences	Plant Science	Lorenzo Lamattina	National Research Council of Argentina, National University of Mar del Plata	
Social Sciences	Anthropology and Cultural Studies	Luisa Margolies		
Social Sciences	Economics	Pablo Andrés Neumeyer	Torcuato di Tella University	
Social Sciences	Political Science	Daniel Mato	Central University of Venezuela	
Social Sciences	Political Science	René Antonio Mayorga	Bolivian Center for Multi-Disciplinary Studies, Brown University	
Social Sciences	Sociology	Jorge Schvarzer	University of Buenos Aires	

== See also ==
- Guggenheim Fellowship
- List of Guggenheim Fellowships awarded in 2004
- List of Guggenheim Fellowships awarded in 2006
