= Kathy Grove =

American photographer (born 1948)

- Born: 1948 (age 77–78); Pittsburgh, Pennsylvania
- Notable work: The Other Series, After Lange
- Style: Conceptual photography

Kathy Grove (born 1948) is an American conceptual feminist photographer. As a professional photo retoucher for fashion magazines, Grove became familiar with airbrushing and photo manipulation techniques in that industry. Her work uses those skills to remove subjects from iconic works, or to alter their appearance. Grove wrote that this practice is intended to "portray women as they have been regarded throughout history, invisible and inaudible."^{[2]} Her photo series, The Other Series, includes reproductions of canonical paintings in Western art with the feminine subjects removed.

== Early life and education ==
Kathy Grove was born in Pittsburgh, Pennsylvania to two graduates of the Carnegie Tech Architecture School. Her mother graduated first in her class, Phi Beta Kappa, as only the second female ever to attend the Carnegie Architecture School. Kathy learned mechanical and architectural drawing working in the Pittsburgh office of her father.

From 1966 to 1970, Grove studied painting, printmaking and photography at the Rhode Island School of Design and its Honors program in Rome, Italy. Upon graduation, she spent a year at Stanley William Hayter’s Atelier 17 in Paris studying color viscosity printing, intaglio techniques, and bookbinding. She then worked at Boston’s Experimental Etching Studio for a year before attending graduate school at the University of Wisconsin-Madison. While in Boston, she supported herself doing mechanical drafting at Massachusetts Institute of Technology.

At Wisconsin, from 1974 – 1976, she experimented further with printmaking and photography, as well as paper-making and commercial photo-mechanics. She also did coursework in the Women’s Studies Department. She began "drawing" with a sewing machine and paper punches, producing eccentrically undulating, abstract paper and plastic wall reliefs, with components grommetted together; and 3-D "rayograms" on large sheets of Estar plastic photo paper. She then re-photographed these, printed multiples of the images photo-lithographically, and used them to create subsequent generations of new paper and plastic wall reliefs that were large 3 dimensional abstract photomontage works.

== Style and career ==
Upon moving to New York in 1978, Grove initially supported herself by teaching, and doing cartographic drafting and photo-darkroom work. She continued to create topographic wall reliefs of paper, photo montage materials, Masonite, and aluminum painted with acrylic and encaustic, slowly introducing silhouettes of recognizable images. She became involved with the Heresies Women’s Collective, exhibited in group shows, and in 1984, had her first solo show at P.P.O.W. Gallery, at its original location in the East Village.

Her knowledge of darkroom techniques, photography, graphics, and airbrush enabled her to work as a photo retoucher of fashion and products for advertising firms. Seeing that every photo of every model or product was retouched to "perfection" led Grove to turn her retouching talents to do fashion "makeovers" of such female icons as Dorothea Lange’s Migrant Mother for shows like Inherent Vice at the Woodstock Center for Photography.

Grove reworked an original image, photographer Dorothea Lange's Migrant Mother, Nipomo, California. The subject, Florence Owens Thompson, had her wrinkles and moles removed, and has makeup and nail polish added. Jo-Anna Isaak writes that the result is a transformation into a woman "of Calvin Klein ads."

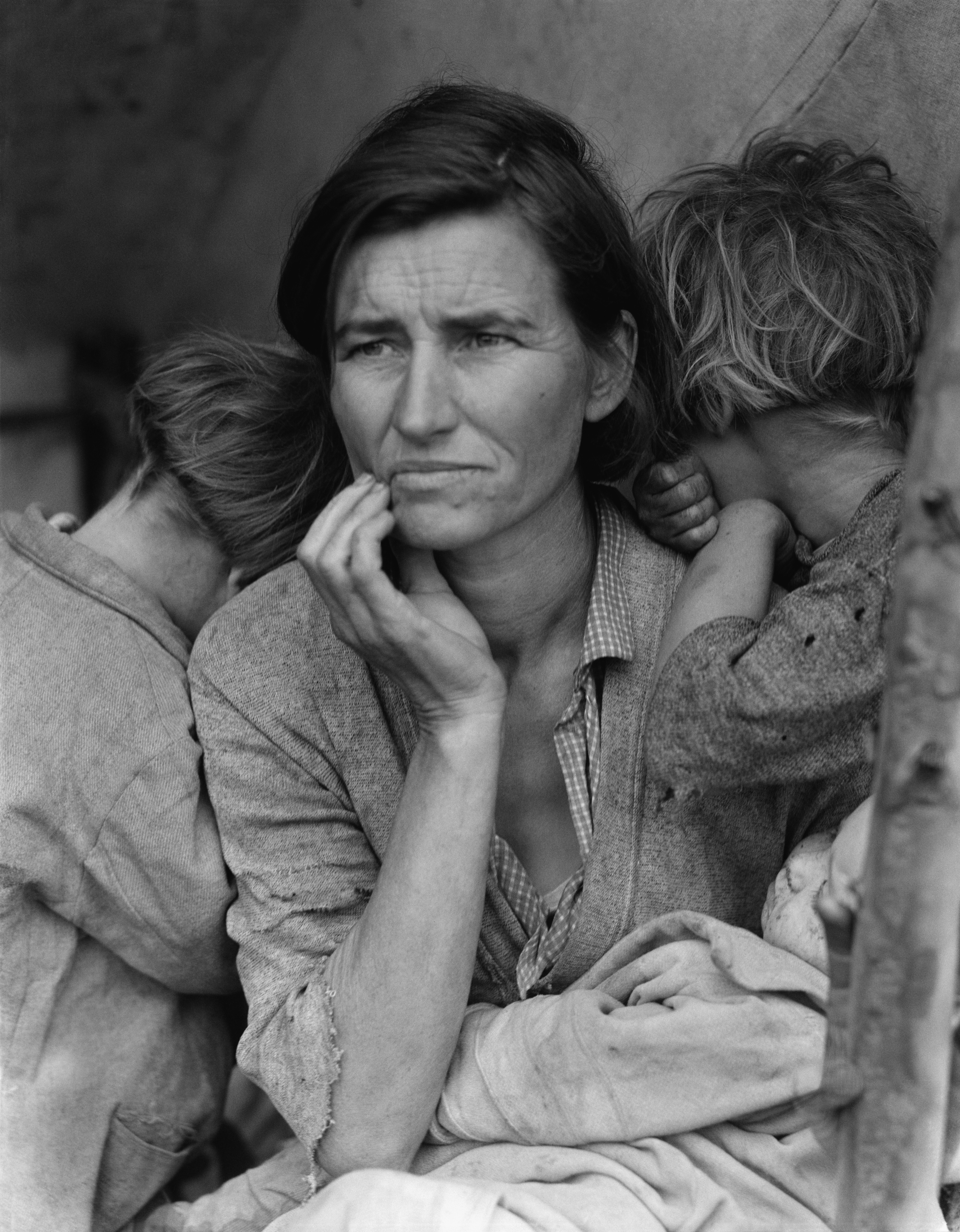
Migrant Mother (LOC fsa.8b29516), Lange's original, prior to Grove's modification

Grove wrote that this practice is intended to "portray women as they have been regarded throughout history, invisible and inaudible."

Grove curated her own show, Selling Us Ourselves, about the conceits of advertising, for the store front vitrines of the non-profit venue 10-on-8. Working at Oya DeMerli’s SiteOne Digital Studio, Grove collaborated in 1994 with the COLORS magazine graphic designer Tibor Kalman to create "Reagan With Aids," a protest poster, and "What If...", racial-facial makeovers in which celebrities such as Arnold Schwarzenegger, Michael Jackson, the Pope, Spike Lee and others had their races changed.

== The Other Series ==
Sympathetic with the research of the Guerilla Girls about how few women were in museum collections and reproduced in art survey books, Grove embarked upon a lifelong project, The Other Series, wherein, using her retouching skills, she removed images of women from iconic paintings and photographs by male artists from Cimabue to Andy Warhol. The first group of these works were altered using professional techniques involving bleach, dyes, and other airbrushing tools. Her color photo prints were shown as a solo exhibition at Pace-MacGill Gallery in 1989. In The Other Series: After Matisse, Grove removes nude model Henriette Darricarrère from a 1926 Henri Matisse painting, leaving nothing but an empty chair.

The Other Series: After Janson: Masaccio, an excerpt of the text of H.W. Janson’s History of Art pages about Masaccio, with retouched reproductions of the paintings tipped in by Grove, was reproduced in an April 1990 issue of Artforum as a special artist’s project.

Expanded versions of The Other Series, done digitally, were the subject of a 1992 show at P.P.O.W. Gallery, and at the California State University Gallery at Long Beach later the same year. A near-complete presentation of the series was held at the Musee d Elysee, Lausaunne, Switzerland, but then traveled to FotoForum, Frankfort in 2002. These works were presented in the form of archival color digital prints that were a cross between original drawings, fine color chromolithographs, and deluxe art history "tipped-in" book plates.

Grove continues to add works to The Other Series and they continue to impact different audiences. In May 2015, The Civilians, the first theater group in residence at the Metropolitan Museum of Art, used Grove’s image treatment and verbatim discussion of John Singer Sargent’s Madame X painting as the basis for one act of The Way They Live, their drama based art works in the museum’s American Wing.

== Later work ==
Tired from the pioneering years of her work neither being readily accepted as a new development in orthodox "photography" nor a variant form of "appropriation art," Grove has increasingly heeded Marcel Duchamp’s admonition that the avant-garde artist’s only true recourse was to "go underground." It has been intimated that she has been pursuing certain significant projects that, again like Duchamp, may only come to light with her death. In recent years she has agreed to show only when her work had been carefully researched and sought out, as in the case of Mia Fineman’s Faking It: Manipulated Photography Before PhotoShop 2012 exhibition and book produced for the Metropolitan Museum of Art and National Gallery of Art. Likewise, she has been very selective in accepting public teaching or lecture invitations. Her work has been discussed in select journals, such as Lawrence Weschler’s Omnivore, or in art history or theory courses taught by photo or feminist scholars such as Anna Chave, of the CUNY Graduate Center and Joanna Isaak of Fordham University.

In addition to the ongoing Other Series, in recent years Grove has undertaken other known groups of work addressing the themes of imperfection, evanescence/transience, absence, loss, and mortality. In her OutTakes series, Grove made cryptic abstract photo compositions entirely from the detail images of wrinkles, pimples, and other skin imperfections she removed from her digital fashion and beauty retouching projects. The collection of these details has been called the "calligraphy of human imperfections."

In the Flotsam and Jetsam series of manipulated photo images, Grove offers up tangible visual manifestations of the ephemeral nature of mental images. She overlays black and white views of archetypical family activities from the turn of the 20th c., a now by-gone age, with small, nearly incoherent bit-streamed fragments, shards, and pixelizations of contemporary life. Presented as large velvety dark digital prints or ephemeral wall-sized projections, they contrast the fixity of the past with the near dictatorship of movement in the present. As if viewed through the lenses of memory, some details resonate in crystal-clear sharp focus, while others remain forever out of reach, shrouded in a resolute, but enigmatic fog, riveting viewer attention while denying perceptual closure.

As photography has become highly monetized in recent years, Grove has been increasingly sought after to produce entire shows of work for other contemporary artists - doing all of the actual digital retouching, manipulation, and compositing work.

Grove was among the first to receive an Anonymous Was a Woman Foundation Fellowship and has also received awards from the Leon Levy Foundation, Art Matters, the New York State Council on the Arts and others. She has had residency fellowships at Yaddo, the Seaside Institute, MacDowell Colony, Dora Maar House and the Bogliasco Foundation.

In introducing Grove at her 1997 guest lecture at the International Center for Photography, Phil Block, the Director of Programs, stated that "few people can radically alter the history of photography or the history of art but, in her work, Kathy Grove is the rare person who has done both."

Among other projects related to Grove’s work, scholars Anna Chave, of the CUNY Graduate Center and Joanna Isaak of Fordham University did a videotaped dialogue, Kathy Grove: An Interview About The Other Series. Filmed and edited by Tricia McLaughlin, in 2001.

== Public collections ==
- Addison Gallery of American Art
- Art Institute of Chicago
- Avon Corporation
- Big Flower Press
- Dancing Bear Photography Collection
- Chazen Museum of Art, Madison, WI
- Musee de l'Elysee, Lausanne, Switzerland
- Metropolitan Museum of Art
- Philadelphia Museum of Art
- Princeton University Art Museum
- Helen Hooper Foundation
- SITE, New York, NY

== Selected bibliography ==
- 2012 Fineman, Mia, Faking It: Manipulated Photography Before PhotoShop. Metropolitan Museum of Art, New York
- 2011 Hunt, W. M., "The Unseen Eye: Photographs from the Unconscious", Aperture.
- 2007 Kozloff, Max, "The Theater of the Face", Phaidon Press, Fall, 2007
- 2006 Ewing, William, "Face: The New Photographic Portrait", Thames & Hudson, August 2006
- 2004 Hayward Gallery, "About Face: Photography and the Death of the Portrait", 2004
- 2003 Weschler, Lawrence, "Kathy Grove", OMNIVORE, Premier Issue, August 2003
- 1999 Ewing, William A., LOVE AND DESIRE: Photoworks, Thames and Hudson, London
- 1996 Isaak, Jo Anna, FEMINISM & CONTEMPORARY ART, Routledge, London & New York, 1996
- 1995 Ewing, William A., THE BODY: Photoworks of the Human Form, Thames and Hudson, London
- 1993 Felshin, Nina, EMPTY DRESS: CLOTHING AS SURROGATE IN RECENT ART, Independent Curators, Inc., New York, NY, catalog.
- 1992 Glenn, Constance, "The Presence of Absence," CENTRIC 47: KATHY GROVE, The University Art Museum, California State University, Long Beach, catalog
- 1991 Goldberg, Vicki, "Content Is All-Or Nothing," THE NEW YORK TIMES, July 7.
