= The Great Led Zeppelin Wine Pairing =

The Great Led Zeppelin Wine Pairing is a series of "wine and music pairings," created by noted restaurateur and viticulturist Joe Bastianich and writer-musician Mike Edison, along with writer and wine expert David Lynch. Bastianich and Lynch are both recipients of the James Beard Award.

The idea was formed when Bastianich and Edison were pondering how to pair the songs of Led Zeppelin with various wines.

"Our passion for wine is only rivaled by our passion for Zeppelin," said Bastianich, and encouraged attendees to "taste with their ears and listen with their mouths."

Edison, in an interview with publishing blog Galley Cat, said, "Either you see this as a hyper-intellectual exercise in promoting the lexicon of oenology as a valid critical system while simultaneously subverting it and subjecting it to ridicule—or you think it is just some dudes who want to drink some really good wine and listen to Led Zeppelin. No matter what, it is still going be the best salon since Dorothy Parker made that crack about horticulture."

== Reasoning for the Led Zeppelin name ==
Edison has explained that "Zep is the perfect band to pair with wine—maybe the only band. They have all the right qualities: They can be earthy and intense, or dark and mellow, or just insanely huge. They've got some very real, edgy twang, and some rich, complex textures. They embrace both the Old World and the New. I can't think of any other band that shows so much depth and development, both within individual songs and across entire records," adding, that the wine pairings were both "freakishly sophisticated and patently absurd."

== History ==
The first Great Led Zeppelin Wine Pairing was held at Becco restaurant in New York City on March 17, 2009, and received excellent reviews and widespread media attention. The New York Post reported, "Guests at Tuesday night's first-ever Great Led Zeppelin Wine Tasting were an odd combo of wine fans and Zep heads but it didn't take many samplings for everyone to start feeling a whole lotta love."

The menu, created by chef Billy Gallagher, featured six courses, each paired with wine and select Led Zeppelin songs, as follows:

~Antipasto~

"The Song Remains the Same"

Grilled Calamari & Dandelion Salad with Hard-Boiled Egg

Champagne 1er Cru Vertus NV, Guy Larmandier (France) Gruner Veltliner Smaragd Terrassen 2007, Domane Wachan (Austria)

~Primi~

"Going to California"

Pappardelle with Wild Mushroom Ragu

Pinot Noir Knox Alexander 2006, Au Bon Climat (California)

"Black Dog"

Black Spaghetti Arrabiata with Sautéed Shrimp

Malbec 2005, Tritono (Argentina)

~Secondi~

"Kashmir", "Whole Lotta Love"

Bistecca alla Becco

Black Angus Rib-Eye Steak grilled Medium-Rare with Garlic Mashed Potatoes & Sauteed Broccoli Rabe

Barolo Vigne Rionda 2000, Oddero (Italy)

~Dolci~

"Tangerine"

Farm Fresh Tangerines

Moscato d’Asti 2008, Vietti (Italy)

"Custard Pie"

Vanilla Custard Pie & Led Zeppolini

The second Great Led Zeppelin Wine Tasting was held at City Winery in New York City and featured the Led Zeppelin Tribute band Six Foot Nurse performing live with special guest Scott Ian from the band Anthrax. More events are expected, including one in Las Vegas in May 2010. <-- did this take place? -->

== Quotes ==
Joe Bastianich: "I think because of the sheer complexity and the deep roots of the music—where the music comes from, and how profound it is— Led Zeppelin's music can only really be paralleled with the kind of evolution, importance and complexity of wine, as both a cultural thing as well as a beverage."

Mike Edison: "Back when I was in seminary school, attempting to pair Boones Farm apple wine with "Stairway to Heaven" and having disastrous results, I stumbled upon this little theory: "Led Zeppelin IV" is the record that when you're stoned and listening to it really loud you think the phone is ringing when it's really not. 'Black Dog' is like a fully fucking awesome motherfucker—this is when they got really heavy."

David Lynch (referring to the "Black Dog" pairing): We're bringing the thunder. We're bringing the tannin. We're bringing the viscosity. We're coming at you with guns blazing, with a Malbec from Argentina.
