= Sienna Shields =

American abstract collage artist

- Born: 1976 (age 49–50); Anchorage, Alaska, United States
- Education: Lewis & Clark College, Portland, Oregon
- Known for: mixed-media artwork, the Yams Collective
- Notable work: Good Stock on the Dimension Floor: An Opera
- Style: Abstract art
- Website: siennashields.com

Sienna Shields (born 1976) is an American abstract artist specializing in large-format collage pieces. She was also the chief organizer of the HowDoYouSayYaminAfrican? artist collective and the director of its digital work, Good Stock on the Dimension Floor: An Opera which was accepted for the 2014 Whitney Biennial.

== Early life ==
Shields was born in Alaska in 1976. Both her parents were teachers and she and two siblings were home-schooled for a time while living outside Anchorage. She graduated from Lewis & Clark College, Portland, Oregon with a degree in Caribbean and Latin American history in 1998. in 2002, she moved to the DUMBA collective in Brooklyn.

== Artistic style ==
Shields's working process has been influenced by the "energy and chaos" of the collectives in which she lived for much of her working life. Many of her works are variations on collages of acrylic paint and multiple layers of cut or torn paper, assembled into large abstract pieces. She developed this working style after college in part due to financial restraints. Other works include bead sculptures, mixed media art, and digital imagery.

== 2014 Whitney Biennial ==
The Whitney Biennial of contemporary art is an invitation-only exhibition which generally favors young artists and in the past helped bring greater recognition to artists like Georgia O'Keeffe, Jackson Pollock and Jeff Koons. The Biennial has often faced criticism over issues of privilege, access and inclusivity. Shields organized the Yams Collective (short for HowDoYouSayYaminAfrican?) of 38 international mostly black and queer musicians, poets, actors, writers and visual artists to create a digital film about racial identity for the 2014 edition. Shields was encouraged by this diversity, saying: "I’d go to art events, and I’d be the only black person in the room — here in New York. It was ridiculous." One of the Biennial's curators, Michelle Grabner, had visited Shields in her studio and seen a short video loop she had made in Alaska. This became the instigation for the collective's submission, a 53-minute digital piece in 35 parts titled Good Stock on the Dimension Floor: An Opera.

Despite the collective's membership, one of the few individual black female artists invited that year was "Donelle Woolford", a creation of Joe Scanlan. Scanlan, a white, male, Princeton University professor hired a succession of actresses to play "Woolford" at events. The inclusion of this "fake" artist led the Yams Collective to withdraw their submission, objecting to "Woolford's" inclusion in a show alongside their work. Shields explained the withdrawal was due to not only Scanlan but also:"...the history of the Whitney and its lack of any kind of initiative in changing its white supremacist attitudes." The collective also considered the inclusion of Scanlan to be a reflection of larger issues of racism in the elite art world. The film instead premiered at the Trinidad and Tobago Film Festival.

== Other notable exhibitions ==
=== Solo exhibitions ===
- July 11-September 12, 2009, The Other Line, Brooklyn, Superfront Gallery Artist in residence exhibition
- January 7-February 6, 2019 Invisible Woman, Chicago, Kruger Gallery

=== Joint and group exhibitions ===
- November 6-December 20, 2009, Francis Young & Sienna Shields, Berlin, Kuma-Galerie.
- November 8, 2012 – March 10, 2013, FORE, New York, Studio Museum in Harlem reoccurring group show survey of the work of contemporary young minority artists of importance.

== Personal life ==
Shields married fellow artist Chuck Close in 2013 and he included her as a subject in his 2017 series Subway Portraits although they had by that time divorced.

== See also ==
- Whitney Museum of American Art
- Artivism
- Chuck Close
