= William Gallagher =

William Gallagher may refer to:

- William Gallagher (baseball) (1874–1950), baseball player
- William Gallagher (civil servant) (1851–1933), British civil servant
- William Gallagher (politician) (1875–1946), U.S. Representative from Minnesota
- William Gallagher (writer), British writer and journalist
- William Davis Gallagher (1808–1894), American journalist and poet
- William J. Gallagher (colonel), president of Riverside Military Academy in Gainesville, Georgia
- William M. Gallagher (1923–1975), Pulitzer Prize-winning photographer
- Bill Gallagher (baseball) (1863–1890), US baseball player
- Billy Gallagher (businessman) (c. 1869–1934), US businessman
- Bill Gallagher (inventor) (Alfred William Gallagher, 1911–1990), New Zealand businessman and inventor
- Billy Gallagher (chef) (1948–2016), chef and businessman in South Africa
- Billy Gallagher (footballer) (1885–1959), Australian rules footballer
- Billy Zero (William Gallagher, born 1971), radio and TV host
- Liam Gallagher (William John Paul Gallagher, born 1972), Oasis singer
- Rory Gallagher (William Rory Gallagher, 1948–1995), Irish blues-rock multi-instrumentalist, songwriter, and bandleader

== See also ==
- William Gallacher (disambiguation)
