= William Gallacher =

William or Willie Gallacher may refer to:

- Willie Gallacher (politician) (1881–1965), Scottish politician
- William Gallacher (footballer) (fl. 1919–1920), Scottish footballer for Burnley
- Willie Gallacher (footballer) (1919–1982), Scottish footballer for Celtic

== See also ==
- William Gallagher (disambiguation)
