= Joe Scanlan (artist) =

American artist and educator (born 1961)

- Born: November 21, 1961 (age 64); Columbus, Ohio, U.S.
- Education: Columbus College of Art & Design, Ohio
- Known for: Contemporary Art
- Movement: Conceptual Art, Design, Publishing
- Website: www.joescanlan.biz

Joe Scanlan (born November 21, 1961) is an American post-conceptual artist and art educator.

== Education ==
Scanlan was born in Columbus, Ohio. He holds a BFA (1984) in Sculpture from the Columbus College of Art and Design.

== Academic career ==
Scanlan was assistant director of The Renaissance Society in Chicago from 1987 to 1994. After moving to New York City in 1995, he was appointed an Assistant Professor in the Sculpture Department at Yale University (2001–2009). He was appointed Professor of Art at Princeton University in 2009, where he served as Director of the Visual Arts Program from 2009 to 2017. He continues to teach a diverse range of courses at Princeton, from a freshman seminar titled Contemporary Art and the Amateur to an advanced interdisciplinary studio class entitled Extraordinary Processes.

== Exhibitions ==
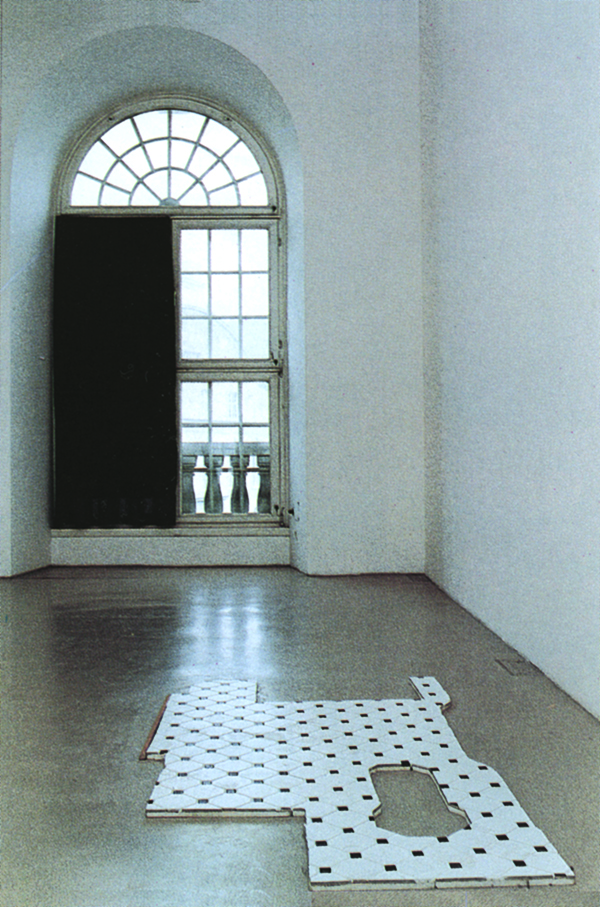
Installation view of Bathroom Floor (1991), documenta IX, Kassel, Germany, 1992

=== Early career ===
Scanlan quit graduate school in 1986 but remained in Chicago for the next decade as part of a group of young artists and critics intent on expanding the kinds of art being made and discussed in the city, including Theaster Gates, Gaylen Gerber, Michelle Grabner, Hudson, Jin Lee, Kerry James Marshall, Hirsch Perlman, Dan Peterman, Kay Rosen, David Sedaris, and Tony Tasset. Significant exhibitions included his first solo exhibition, Fairly Recent Work, at Robbin Lockett Gallery; I, Myself, and Others at Le Magasin, Grenoble; and Documenta 9 in Kassel, Germany. About Documenta 9, New York Times art critic Michael Kimmelman wrote:

And yet if political art is downplayed, esthetics is hardly a guiding principle. For every work as captivating and touching as [Gary] Hill's video installation depicting ghostly figures, walking toward and away from the viewer, there are numerous visually numbing pieces like Joe Scanlan's section of a bathroom floor. (Counting the works of Mr. Scanlan and [Mike] Kelley, Wim Delvoye's tiles decorated with images of excrement, [Ilya] Kabakov's reconstruction of a Soviet public rest room, and Attila Richard Lukac's pissoir, the show's most dominant motif may very well be the toilet.)

Scanlan moved to New York City in 1996, where he continues to live. He was represented by D'Amelio Terras Gallery and made three solo shows there from 1996 to 2002, including a show titled Invention that claimed to have dealt with the subjecys of consumption, desire, identity, and death.

DIY (2003). Offset ink on paper, repurposed IKEA products, fresh flowers. Permanent collection of The Van Abbemuseum, Eindhoven, The Netherlands.

=== Thingsthatfall ===
Scanlan left D'Amelio Terras in 2002 to set up his own commercial outlet, the website thingsthatfall.com. The launch of the website coincided with a string of exhibitions in Europe that elaborated on themes raised by the Invention show. Pay Dirt (2002) was a site-specific project commissioned by the Ikon Gallery, Birmingham, England, in which Scanlan sought, attained, and enacted United States Utility Patent #6,488,732, a process for converting consumer waste into viable potting soil. The project was a satire on the get-rich-quick fantasies of the dot.com boom, intellectual property hoarding, and the burgeoning data-mining industry. Entropy For Sale (2005) was an exhibition at Galerie Micheline Szwajcer, Antwerp, that took up American artist Robert Smithson's theme of entropy to interrogate how all manner of collapse, destruction, disaster, and downfall were becoming entrepreneurial inspirations and profit sources. The exhibition caused a minor controversy when the gallery withdrew the show's press release, authored by the artist, because they felt its language was too incendiary.

Creative Destruction, Traveling Salesman, Circular Economy (2008) at Galerie Martin Janda, Vienna, continued Scanlan's investigation of what has come to be known as Disaster Capitalism. The exhibition featured Traveling Salesman, a conceptual artwork in the form of a collapsible market table retrofitted with chambers that held the artist's wares; Circular Economy, a collaboratively produced animation depicting a short loop of consumer objects morphing into other consumer objects; and The Process of Creative Destruction in Action, a room-sized installation of Joseph Schumpeter's classic essay The Process of Creative Destruction chromatically altered and edited so as to apply contemporary art.

== Fictions ==
Since 2000, Scanlan has conceived and enacted four real-time fictions of archetypical art world entities: the store, the small press, the hot young artist, and the nonprofit artist's foundation.

=== Store A ===
Store A was the address of Scanlan's Brooklyn studio from 1997 to 2002 that doubled as a series of pop up commercial venues in contemporary art contexts. The first platform was at D'Amelio Terras in 1999, followed by iterations in Bruges, Antwerp, Luxembourg, Vienna, Paris, and Villeurbanne. Store A culminated in the exhibition Passing Through (2007–08) at Kunstsammlung Nordrhein-Westfalen (K21) in Düsseldorf, in which a flexible modular pavilion modeled on the artist's original Brooklyn studio was commissioned by K21. Over the course of eighteen months, the structure slowly morphed and circumnavigated the museum's top-floor winter garden while an evolving array of exhibitions and store displays took place within its walls.

=== Commerce Books ===
Commerce Books began as the publishing arm of Store A and, later, Thingsthatfall. Its first issue was a spoof of October Magazine titled Commerce that mimicked the legendary MIT publication's academic style and included a roster of five editors, three of whom were anagrams of "Joe Scanlan" (Neal Jac[k]son, Anna Lojecs, and Jane C. Sloan) and the fourth of whom was Töte Winkel (German for "blind spot"). The fifth editor was Donelle Woolford. Commerce has published nineteen issues thus far, many of which were fabricated under the guise of the fictional editors or real-life artists and writers, including Walter Serner (no. 5), Joseph Schumpeter (no. 11), Jonathan Monk (no. 16) and Elaine Sturtevant (no. 17). Commerce has published authentic material as well, notably the complication Poststructuralism in Country & Western Music (no. 3); a reader devoted to Jorge Pardo's sculpture 4166 Sea View Lane (no.4); and People In Trade (no. 10), a collection of essays on art and labor that includes an original interview with AA Bronson of General Idea.

=== Donelle Woolford ===
Jennifer Kidwell and Joe Scanlan respond to questions after their staging of Donelle Woolford: Dick's Last Stand, at MOCAD, Detroit, in February 2014.

In 2007, after several years of developing the character, Scanlan held auditions and then hired two professionally trained female actors, Jennifer Kidwell and Abigail Ramsay, to play the role of an emerging black female artist named Donelle Woolford. As part of the back story and set design for the character, Scanlan made a body of abstract collage works reminiscent of Cubism. The curtain went up, so to speak, in a show titled Donelle Woolford: A Narrative by Joe Scanlan at Chez Valentin, Paris, in 2007. Subsequent stagings involved performances within the larger project that took place in New York, Chicago, London, and Vienna. In a Bomb interview with Jeremy Sigler in 2010, Scanlan discussed the role the actors had played in the project to that point, saying that

Jenn [Kidwell] sees it as a political gesture, a kind of territorial claiming of a type of behavior black artists supposedly aren't allowed to have. But I also think it is a political gesture aimed somewhat at me, a refusal to speak on my behalf. Abigail Ramsay, on the other hand, plays Donelle in a rather sunny persona who is willing to talk to anyone in a charming, slightly overly enthusiastic, young artist sort of way. Though she is quite amenable as an actor, Abigail's Donelle is the type of person that many denizens of the art world find annoying, so her characterization is also a kind of statement.

In a later iteration of the project Woolford transformed into another art world mood and archetype: the "mid-career artist". As a book and exhibition that premiered in Paris in 2012, Dick Jokes was a play on Richard Prince's joke paintings and included a national comedy tour based on a stand-up routine by Richard Pryor. The project was included in the 2014 Whitney Biennial, stirring controversy which culminated in the decision of the Yams Collective to withdraw from the Biennial. In Dick's Last Stand (2014), Kidwell played Woolford reenacting a Richard Pryor segment censored from his short-lived 1977 network television show. "See, white folks take everything from me," intones Donelle Woolford in character as Richard Pryor at The Kitchen in New York. Staged as part of Donelle Woolford's participation in the Whitney Biennial, Scanlan and Kidwell's appropriation of Pryor's material was intended to align two "dicks" conceptually: Pryor and the artist Richard Prince.

=== Broodthaers Society of America ===
In 2015 Scanlan founded the Broodthaers Society of America, an institution dedicated to promoting greater appreciation of the Belgian artist Marcel Broodthaers within the context of the United States. The fiction is not unlike a fiction that Broodthaers himself staged, his Musée d'Art Moderne: Département des Aigles (1968–1972). The Society offers access to its archive, organizes public lectures and events, and hosts short- and long-term scholars in an adjacent private residence.

== Artworks ==
Throughout his career Scanlan has made objects that begin their lives as artworks in galleries and museums. Nonetheless, the ability of these objects to leave those spaces and be performed in everyday life is a critical aspect of their status and meaning. As such they can be seen as a class critique of the readymade.

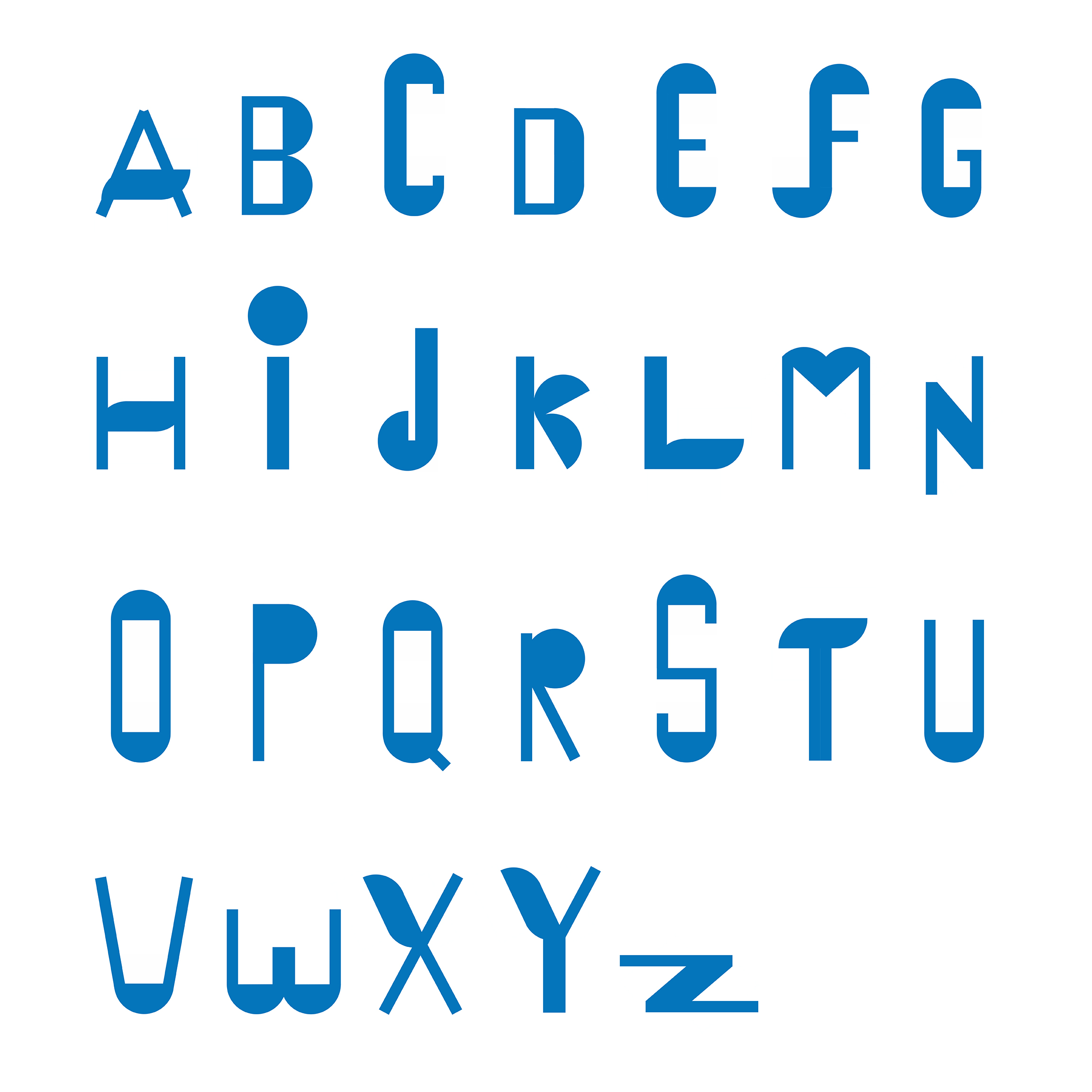
Palermo, upper case letter forms, 2018

=== Catalyst ===
Catalyst was a cosmetic sculpture in the form of an artificial tear that could be affixed to a person's face using clear-drying eyelash adhesive. The product was launched in 1999 and sold in packets of six for $20. For a short time they were seen being worn around New York City quite removed from anyone's awareness of their status as a work of art.

=== DIY ===
DIY is a sculpture of a coffin made from standard Ikea products, primarily a Billy bookcase. It was first conceived and made on site at the Art Gallery of Ontario, Toronto, in 1999 as part of a group exhibition organized by Christina Ritchie titled Waste Management. The artwork was elaborated on three years later in DIY, Or How To Kill Yourself Anywhere in the World for Under $399, an artist's book that provides a shopping list, an inventory of required hand tools, and 120 pages of step-by-step instructions for reverse-engineering standard Ikea products into a fully functioning coffin. The book was Scanlan's contribution to Pierre Huyghe and Philippe Parreno's Annlee project, in which Scanlan cast Annlee as the generic character who demonstrates the various technical maneuvers required for building the coffin.

The book introduced a novel way for an artwork to be produced. Given that Ikea stores exist the world over, museums and private collectors desirous of owning a DIY coffin can purchase the book, go shopping at their local Ikea, and make the artwork themselves rather than having the artist produce it in his studio and then arrange for it to be shipped. To date, in addition to Toronto, versions of DIY have been executed in Basel, Cambridge, Chicago, Eindhoven, Leipzig, London, Lyon, Miami, New York City, San Francisco, Shanghai, Vienna, Zürich, and Kent State University, Kent, Ohio.

=== Pay Dirt ===
Pay Dirt, aka United States Patent No. 6,488,732 is a synthetic potting soil made of 99.85% post-consumer data. The artwork premiered as an ambient, three-ton pile at the IKON Gallery, Birmingham, England, in 2003. It was made of refuse carefully collected from Birmingham's waste stream, and the reconstituted material was ultimately packaged and resold out of the museum's bookstore as IKON Earth and Black Country Rock brand potting soil.

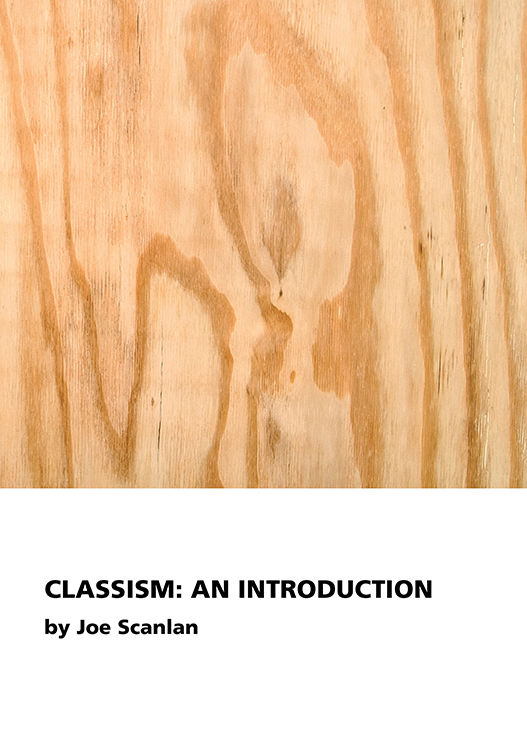
A booklet published by the Kunstverein in Hamburg as part of their exhibition Class Relations: Phantoms of Perception, 2018

=== Nesting Bookcase ===
The Nesting Bookcase is an artwork Scanlan has been making and dispersing since 1989. The most recent iteration of the object took place at the Mu.Zee in Ostend, Belgium, in 2012. For part one of the two-part exhibition, Object Lesson, the Mu.Zee purchased nineteen examples of the Nesting Bookcase for its permanent collection and displayed them on the first floor of the museum. For part two, Truffle Finds Pig, Scanlan and the museum drew up a lending agreement with which any citizen in the town of Ostende can request to borrow and use a Nesting Bookcase for a period of time in their home or place of business.

=== Palermo ===
Introduced in 2018, Palermo is a full upper- and lower-case typeface, the letter forms of which were made by cutting up and rearranging the two component parts of Blinky Palermo's painted object "Blau Scheibe und Stab" (1968).

== Publications ==
- Classism: An Introduction (Kunstverein in Hamburg) 2018
- Paragraphs on Deceptual Art (Galerie Martin Janda) 2018
- Le Classisme: une introduction [extrait] (Les Presses du Réel) 2015
- Object Lessons (Kunstmuseum aan Zee) 2013
- Passing Through (K21, Düsseldorf) 2007
- DIY (Imschoot Uitgevers, Ghent) 2003
- Pay Dirt (Ikon Gallery, Birmingham, England) 2002
- Joe Scanlan (Museum Haus Lange, Krefeld, Germany), 1996

== Public collections ==
Scanlan's work is in the public collections of Kunstsammlung Nordrhein-Westfalen; Tate Modern, London; Centre Georges Pompidou, Paris; the Van Abbemuseum, Eindhoven; the Stedelijk Museum voor Actuele Kunst, Ghent; Mudam, Luxembourg; and the Museum of Contemporary Art, Chicago.
