= Lynda Delph =

American professor of evolution, ecology and behavior

Lynda Ferrell Delph (born 1957) is a Distinguished Professor of Biology and member of the Evolution, Ecology, and Behavior Program at Indiana University - Bloomington.

Delph began her education at the University of Arizona, where she completed her undergraduate education in 1979 and masters in 1983. In 1988, she completed her Ph.D., on gender dimorphism in New Zealand Scrophulariaceae, from the University of Canterbury, which was followed by a post doctoral fellowship at Rutgers University.

After she completed her fellowship, Delph began her career at Indiana University as an assistant professor in 1990, becoming a full professor in 2002 and a distinguished professor in 2017. In addition to her faculty appointments, she served as a senior fellow of the Indiana Molecular Biology Institute and executive director of Science Outreach for the Indiana University College of Arts and Sciences. Delph has also served as an officer in scientific societies in her field, acting as secretary of the Society for the Study of Evolution, Vice President of the American Society of Naturalists, and Council Member and later President of the American Genetic Association. In 2021 she was President of the Society for the Study of Evolution. During the 2022–23 academic year she was a Fellow at the Wissenshaftskolleg zu Berlin (Institute for Advanced Study).

Dr. Delph's research has focused on evolutionary, ecological, and genetic aspects of plant reproduction. Her focus has been on understanding selective forces acting in natural populations and how adaptation is slowed or prevented by genetic constraints. She also pursues research in sexual dimorphism in flowering plants and how it is affected by genetic correlations.

== Awards ==
- Fulbright Fellow, 1983–1984, 1997
- Outstanding Junior Faculty Award, 1994–1995
- Senior Class Award for Teaching Excellence in Biology, 1995
- Teaching Excellence Recognition Award, 2000
- Trustees' Teaching Award, 2005
- Guggenheim Fellowship, 2005
- Fellow of the American Association for the Advancement of Science, 2010
- Member, American Academy of Arts & Sciences, 2022
