= Peter Gourevitch =

American political scientist

Peter Gourevitch (born 1943) is a political scientist who is known for his research in international relations and comparative politics. He is professor emeritus of political science at the University of California, San Diego.

He received his B.A. from Oberlin College and a Ph.D. in Political Science from Harvard University in 1969. He is a former fellow of the Russell Sage Foundation and the John Simon Guggenheim Memorial Foundation. He is a member of the Council on Foreign Relations and chairs its selection committee for International Affairs Fellowships. He is a past president of the Association of Professional Schools of International Affairs.

Gourevitch is well known within the International Relations community for having first coined the term "second image reversed" in a 1978 article that re-examined Kenneth Waltz's three images theory. Gourevitch argued in the article that the international system could affect the domestic political system (causality did not just go the other way).

== Selected publications ==
- Political Power and Corporate Control: The New Global Politics of Corporate Governance, (with James Shinn), 2005.
- United States—Japan Relations & International Institutions After the Cold War, 1995
- New Challenges to International Cooperation: Adjustment of Firms, Policies and Organizations to Global Competition, 1993.
- The Pacific Region (Annals of the American Academy of Political & Social Science, 1989.
- Politics in Hard Times: Comparative Responses To International Economic Crises, 1986.
- Unions and Economic Crisis: Britain, West Germany, and Sweden, 1984.
- Untangling US Foreign Policy.: An article from: Harvard International Review, 2000.
- Politicas Estrategicas En Tiempos Dificiles, 1994.
- How Shareholder Reforms Can Pay Foreign Policy Dividends, (with James P. Shinn), Council on Foreign Relations, 2002
- France and the Troubled World Economy, (with Stephen Cohen, co-editor), 1982.
- International Industrial Relations Perspectives, (edited by Peter Doeringer, with associate editors Peter Gourevitch, Peter Lange, and Andrew Martin), Macmillan Press, 1981.
- Paris and the Provinces: The Politics of Local Government Reform in France, University of California Press, 1980.

== See also ==
- List of Guggenheim Fellowships awarded in 2005
