= Mike Edison =

American writer and musician

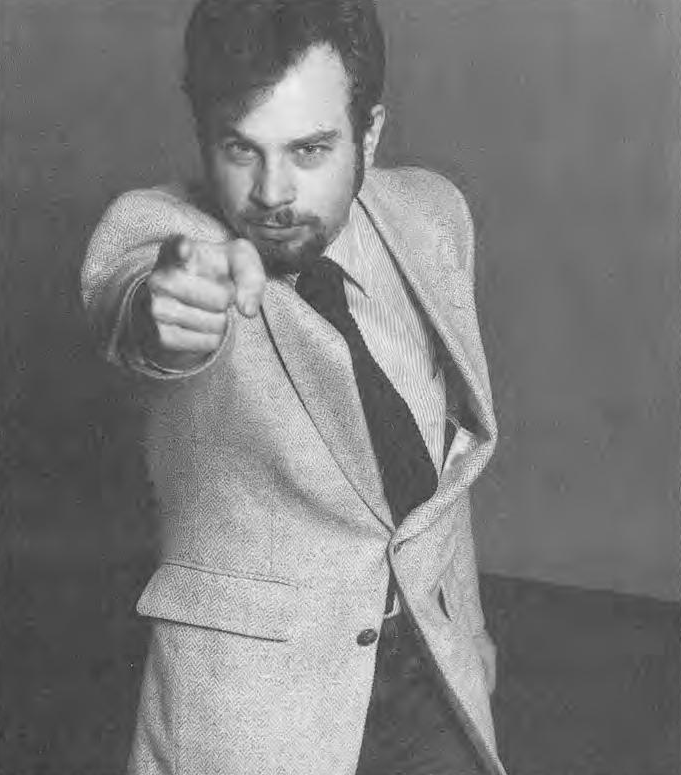
- Edison, circa 1986
- Born: Michael Alan Simberg; August 2, 1964 (age 62); New Brunswick, New Jersey
- Occupations: writer, musician
- Writing career
- Genres: journalism, literary memoir, humor
- Subjects: pop culture, American counterculture, music, drugs, sex, food and wine, professional wrestling
- Website: mikeedison.com

Mike Edison is a New York-based writer, editor, musician, social critic, and spoken word artist. He was one of many publishers/editors of the marijuana counterculture magazine High Times, and was later named editor-in-chief of Screw, the self-proclaimed "World's Greatest Newspaper." In his memoir I Have Fun Everywhere I Go, Edison recounts his adventures across twenty years of druggy adventurism and his parallel careers as a magazine editor, writer, and musician. His other books include the sprawling history of American men's magazines, Dirty! Dirty! Dirty!: Of Playboys, Pigs, and Penthouse Paupers, An American Tale of Sex and Wonder; the political satire Bye, Bye Miss American Pie; several collaborations including Restaurant Man with Joe Bastianich and The Carnivore's Manifesto with Slow Food USA founder Patrick Martins; and most recently, Sympathy for the Drummer: Why Charlie Watts Matters, a history and appreciation of the Rolling Stones drummer Charlie Watts, and the history of blues and rock ’n ’roll drumming. Edison speaks frequently on free speech, and the American counterculture. Between 2011 and 2018, Edison was the host and producer of the weekly Heritage Radio Network series Arts & Seizures.

== Early life ==
In his memoir, Edison describes growing up in a dysfunctional Jewish household in suburban New Jersey, and discovering marijuana at the age of fourteen. Soon after he had his first LSD experience. He later attended the New York University Film School, and Columbia University, dropping out of both to pursue a career as a musician and writer.

== Career: Pro wrestling, sex, and the American counterculture ==
Edison earned his first magazine publishing job in 1986, as editor of Wrestling's Main Event, by defeating the incumbent editor in a bloody Loser Leaves Town match.

Between 1985 and 1988 he authored 28 pornographic novels, and in his career on the seamy side of the publishing business, he has written about German whorehouses and Spanish coke dealers for Hustler, and has published a series of erotic “confessions” for Penthouse Letters. He was also a frequent contributor to Screw magazine, penning chronicles of 42nd Street, then the adult entertainment mecca of New York City.

In the late 1980s Edison began writing a featured column about television and politics, "Shoot the Tube," for marijuana and counterculture magazine High Times. In 1998 Edison was named publisher of High Times, and soon after took control of the editorial side of the magazine as well.

As editor and publisher, he caused a furor among staffers by putting Black Sabbath singer Ozzy Osbourne on the cover, and then leaking to the New York Post's Page Six gossip column that thousands of dollars of pot had gone missing from the photo shoot. After taking the magazine to new heights in sales and advertising, he was instrumental in producing High Times' first feature film, High Times' Potluck. Edison left High Times in 2001.

Following High Times, Edison became the editorial director for upstart Jewish culture magazine Heeb, for whom he went undercover and exposed Jews for Jesus as a Baptist organization. He also covered the 2003 harassment trial of Screw magazine founding editor and publisher Al Goldstein.

Edison left Heeb later that year in protest over a cover story on The Passion of the Christ, a rebuttal to the Mel Gibson film.

In 2003, Edison was named editor-in-chief of Screw (replacing Al Goldstein), where he began writing 17 years before as a freelancer. In late 2006 he announced that he was leaving the editor-in-chief position. Soon after Screw ceased publication.

Edison lives and works as a writer, editor, journalist, and musician in New York City. He continues to write frequently about sex and American culture, and he was the senior editor of music publisher Backbeat Books from 2008 to 2012. His acquisitions at Backbeat ranged from biographies to scholarly and pop histories for all genres of music — from soul music to punk rock to classic rock, jazz, classical, country, and beyond. The final title that was published during his tenure, Lisa Crystal Carver's Reconsidering Yoko Ono, was excerpted extensively in The New York Times Magazine. He has contributed to many publications and websites, including Spin, The Daily Beast, Huffington Post, and the New York Press, for whom he covered professional wrestling and classical music. In 2010, he won the 26th NYC episode of Opium Magazine's “Literary Death Match,” when he surprised the audience and judges by pulling former Sonic Youth drummer Bob Bert out of the audience, who proceeded to play bongos while Edison read from his book, I Have Fun Everywhere I Go. After his performance, celebrity judge and Czech supermodel Paulina Porizkova told HuffPost, “Mike Edison could be reading a tractor manual and I would be interested.”

Edison has also written bios, press releases, and liner notes for numerous bands, including The Stooges, the Ramones, the New York Dolls, Was (Not Was), Zappa Plays Zappa, and Robert Gordon and Chris Spedding. Edison wrote the extensive liner notes for a series of seven deluxe reissues by the Jon Spencer Blues Explosion, including the 2010 compilation Dirty Shirt Rock 'n' Roll: The First Ten Years. Jon Spencer has also played on and produced recordings by the Edison Rocket Train.

== Books ==
=== I Have Fun Everywhere I Go ===
His 2008 memoir is I Have Fun Everywhere I Go: Savage Tales of Pot, Porn, Punk Rock, Pro Wrestling, Talking Apes, Evil Bosses, Dirty Blues, American Heroes, and the Most Notorious Magazines in the World (May 2008, Faber and Faber/Farrar, Straus & Giroux). Reviewing the book, Bookforum called Edison “Cooler than Toby Young and more credible than James Frey,” while the SF Weekly called I Have Fun “high-spirited sleaze, overeducated yokelry, and intensely American egalitarian humor.” Kirkus Reviews gave the book a starred review, calling it, “A beer-sozzled, speed-cranked nail bomb of a book—what everybody's Saturday night should be like." Edison has also been criticized for spending too much time “settling old scores with his enemies,” particularly his former co-workers at High Times, which he refers to as “that dope rag.”

In addition, Edison has recorded a "beatnik bop and punk rock boogaloo, outerspace soundtrack and spoken word" CD, a companion piece to the book, also called I Have Fun Everywhere I Go. The CD, a collaboration with rock musician and producer Jon Spencer, has been called “a revolutionary turn for the spoken word record,” and has been compared to “Lenny Bruce, Jack Kerouac, and Richard Pryor.” “Dean of Rock Critics” Robert Christgau gave the record three stars, giving special praise to the tracks “Pornography, Part I,” and “Ozzy, High Times, and Me.”

Edison performed the book numerous times on the subsequent book tour with his band the Space Liberation Army. Spin magazine commented “Smart, filthy, and funny, Mike Edison is no ordinary author... Edison brings the stories from his book to life with the performance chops of a seasoned rock’n’roller.”

=== Dirty! Dirty! Dirty! ===
Edison's 2011 book Dirty! Dirty! Dirty!: Of Playboys, Pigs, and Penthouse Paupers, An American Tale of Sex and Wonder was described by journalist and historian Rick Perlstein as "foul-mouthed popular history at its most entertaining." Largely a history of American men's magazines, beginning in the 1950s with Hugh Hefner and Playboy and winding its way through the 1960s and 1970s following Hefner's less genteel proegeny, Hustler publisher Larry Flynt, Penthouse publisher Bob Guccione, and Screw founder Al Goldstein, the book covers approximately sixty years of American popular culture and free speech as "viewed from the darkside of the newsstand." Also prominently featured in the book are comedian Lenny Bruce and pornographer Ralph Ginzburg among others. The book was well received. Kirkus called it “an enthusiastic romp,” and LA Weekly noted that, "Edison is a fast enough talker to move the reader quickly into what turns out to be a well-crafted history of censorship and sex." Jewish culture website Jewcy praised Edison's tact in handling the subject of pornography, writing, “a prevalent persuasion in the book is Edison's staunch feminism,” and adding that, “he loves people and their freedoms.”

While working on Dirty! Dirty! Dirty!, Edison was named a Writer in Residence at the New York Public Library. He told PopMatters of the experience, "I went to write and research in my own space at the big library on Fifth Avenue. It was the best, walking past the lions and up the stairs to my desk to look at dirty magazines." Edison would later lecture on free speech at the Library, as well as the University of Chicago and other venues.

In November 2011 Ian's Pizza in Chicago honored Edison by naming a pizza after him, the Mike Edison Dirty Pie.

=== Bye Bye, Miss American Pie ===
In the run up to the 2012 presidential election, Edison released the novella Bye Bye, Miss American Pie, available exclusively as an ebook, and printed in a hand-bound, limited edition of 300 numbered copies. The book was described as "the first bawdy political satire of the 21st century ... Myra Breckinridge meets Breakfast of Champions."

=== You Are a Complete Disappointment ===
In 2016 Edison published his second memoir, You Are a Complete Disappointment — A Triumphant Memoir of Failed Expectations (May 2016, Sterling Publishing). The title comes from his father's very last words to him, delivered on his deathbed. In the memoir, which covers the period before Edison's first memoir, I Have Fun Everywhere I Go, Edison discusses growing up in New Jersey with a narcissistic, bullying father, and how he learned to escape from an abusive situation. Eventually he finds forgiveness with the help of a therapist, whom he refers to (“with her permission”) as "Dr. Headshrinker", comparing her to Jennifer Melfi on the television series The Sopranos, and a rescued kitten named Jeepster, after the song by Marc Bolan. Edison also returns to familiar themes featured in his other books, including space travel, rock and roll, and professional wrestling, using the concept of “kayfabe” —wrestling argot for “the portrayal of staged events as real or true” — to discuss his father's obsession with his own polished public image. Previously Edison has used kayfabe to discuss the self-perpetuated myth-making of Hugh Hefner in Dirty! Dirty! Dirty!

You Are a Complete Disappointment received good reviews. Booklist wrote that “Edison's memoir about his troubled relationship with his straitlaced dad is a work of humor and pathos.” The Star-Ledger called You Are a Complete Disappointment “a total delight,” adding that “Edison knows what he's doing on the page, is skilled at engaging the reader and is a likeable guy as he lays bare his insecurities, pain and loves.”

=== Sympathy for the Drummer ===
In 2019, Edison released Sympathy for the Drummer: Why Charlie Watts Matters, (Backbeat Books), a biography and appreciation of The Rolling Stones drummer Charlie Watts. The book has been described as “both a gonzo rush—capturing the bristling energy of the Rolling Stones and the times in which they lived—and a wide-eyed reflection on why the Greatest Rock 'n' Roll Band in the World needed the world's greatest rock 'n' roll drummer.”

Sympathy for the Drummer was critically acclaimed, called, “The most colorfully graphic and, arguably, the most accurate description extant of the Rolling Stones at the absolute pinnacle of their career” by All About Jazz. Classic Rock called the book, “Rollicking ... highly engaging ... essential,” and PopMatters said, “Sympathy for the Drummer is one of the small number of books that can open your ears. Infectious... a remarkable achievement.” Embraced by the drumming community, the biography received praise from Clem Burke of Blondie, and Bun E. Carlos of Cheap Trick who called it, “Required reading for any Stones fan.” Jim Sclavunos (Nick Cave and the Bad Seeds, The Cramps, etc.) said that Sympathy is “an effusively infectious tribute to art in all of its myriad forms.” In 2020, Charlie Watts himself called the author to thank him for writing “such a lovely book.”

Edison narrated and co-produced the audiobook for Sympathy with Jesse Cannon, and featured guests include Jon Spencer, Mickey Finn (Boss Hog), and Pete Zaramba (The Fleshtones). While talking about creating the audiobook, Edison said, “I listened to Bruce Springsteen's audiobook and it sounded like he was in sixth grade and telling me what he did on his summer vacation. It made no sense. It was insulting. The book is so great — why couldn't he bring the same impact to the audio version where truly, you can do anything? I know some audio products are becoming more fleshed out productions, but the industry norm is not to rock the boat. Jesse and I are trying to change that.”

== Videos and trailers ==
Edison has created book trailers and video promotion for his work, collaborating with noted visual artist, Guggenheim grant recipient Tricia McLaughlin for the first-ever 3D book trailer for Dirty! Dirty! Dirty!, in addition to a widely seen performance video, “Hugh Hefner Hates Girls,” featuring musicians Jon Spencer and Dee Pop. For his first book, I Have Fun Everywhere I Go, Edison created the “legendary bong guitar video” which has been described as “the most watched non-fiction book trailer of all time,” with over 500,000 views on YouTube. For his most recent book, Sympathy for the Drummer: Why Charlie Watts Matters, Edison created a mock TV ad loosely based on the famous Crazy Eddie ads from the 1970s, and parodies John Zacherle, the late-night horror movie host. Edison gained attention for the outre energy of the ad, which included the veiled threat that “not everyone is gonna be happy, especially not if you are the drummer in Aerosmith." Additionally, a trailer for the audio book was created resembling that of a Hollywood blockbuster.

== Food and wine ==
Edison was the collaborator with restaurateur and viticulturist Joe Bastianich on his 2012 best-selling memoir Restaurant Man of which author Bret Easton Ellis has said "There is no fussiness and not a single boring sentence." Edison and Bastianich also collaborated to create The Great Led Zeppelin Wine Pairing, a series of "wine and music pairings." In 2014 Edison collaborated with Slow Food USA founder Patrick Martins and released The Carnivore's Manifesto, about "eating well, eating responsibly, and eating meat." The Atlantic magazine named The Carnivore's Manifesto as one of the "Best Food Books of 2014.

== Music ==
Edison was the long-time drummer for New York cult-garage band the Raunch Hands (Crypt Records) as well as being a collaborator of punk rocker GG Allin, with whom he wrote a number of songs and recorded two albums. He currently leads his own long-running band, the Edison Rocket Train, and is currently collaborating with popular Spanish blues punk group Guadalupe Plata. Their collaboration LP, The Devil Can't Do You No Harm, recorded in Seville, Spain, was released in April 2021 on Madrid-based label Everlasting Records after it was delayed due to the COVID-19 pandemic.

In 1984 Edison joined the Rock Against Reagan Tour, opening shows in San Francisco, Washington, DC, and Dallas for New York hardcore band Reagan Youth.

In late 1984 he and three NYU classmates formed the New York post-punk band Killdozer, who released one self-produced LP entitled There's No Mistaking Quality before changing their band name to Sharky's Machine in order to avoid confusion with Madison, Wisconsin's postpunk band Killdozer.

Edison joined the Raunch Hands in early 1990 and accompanied them that year on a tour of Japan, later relocating with them to Madrid, Spain.

In 1992, while living in Madrid, Edison joined Spanish hardcore punk band The Pleasure Fuckers, and played with them through 1995.

In 2001 he formed the Edison Rocket Train, switching to vocals and guitar. The Edison Rocket Train has released two full-length CDs, Yes! Yes!! Yes!!! and East River Delta (produced by Jon Spencer), and several singles, including the traditional gospel number “This Train,” and the pro-wrestling themed “I Like to Hurt People,” featuring Handsome Dick Manitoba of proto -punk band the Dictators. These were later compiled for digital streaming as Go-Go Gospel and the Shakin’ Beat: The History of the Edison Rocket Train, Vol. 1. The Edison Rocket Train continues to perform and record. The current line-up includes Boss Hog keyboard player Mickey Finn and drummer Dee Pop, formerly of the Gun Club, and a founding member of New York No Wave band Bush Tetras. Edison also frequently performs frequently as a solo acoustic act, accompanying himself on guitar and occasionally piano.

Spencer also performs frequently with Edison, backing him for spoken word performances with Edison's group the Rocket Train Delta Science Arkestra — which has also featured ex-Capt. Beefheart guitarist Gary Lucas — and more recently the Space Liberation Army in which Edison also plays electric organ and Theremin. Edison has also appeared frequently with Lucas's band Gods and Monsters.

In 2019, The Space Liberation Army (now featuring Mickey Finn and ex-Sonic Youth drummer Bob Bert) were the featured performers at the East Village Arts Festival, hosted by the New York Public Library.

== Selected discography ==
- Sharky's Machine, Let's Be Friends (Shimmy Disc, 1987)
- Sharky's Machine, A Little Chin Music (EP, LSD/Berlin, 1988)
- GG Allin, You Give Love a Bad Name (Homestead, 1987)
- GG Allin, Res-Erected (ROIR, 1998)
- Raunch Hands, Million Dollar Movie (Crypt,1+2 Records, Barn Homes/Japan, 1990)
- Raunch Hands, Fuck Me Stupid (Crypt,1+2 Records, Barn Homes/Japan, 1992)
- Raunch Hands, Got Hate If You Want It: Live at Cavestomp (Crypt, 2002)
- Raunch Hands, Bigg Topp (Licorice Tree, 2007)
- The Pleasure Fuckers, Ripped (Sympathy for the Record Industry, 1993)
- Edison Rocket Train with Handsome Dick Manitoba, "I Like to Hurt People" (Carbon 14, 2002)
- Edison Rocket Train, Yes! Yes!! Yes!!! (Steel Cage, 2003)
- Mike Edison, How Punk Rock Ruined My Life: The Best of Mike Edison, Vol. 1
- Mike Edison and the Rocket Train Delta Science Arkestra, I Have Fun Everywhere I Go (Interstellar Roadhouse, 2008)
- Mike Edison and the Space Liberation Army “I Walk with a Zombie” video (2009)
- Edison Rocket Train: Go-Go Gospel and the Shakin’ Beat, the History of the Edison Rocket Train, Vol. 1. (Interstellar Roadhouse, 2014)
