= HowDoYouSayYaminAfrican? =

HowDoYouSayYamInAfrican? is a collective founded in 2013. The group, also called the YAMS Collective, was formed to bring a digital media piece titled Good Stock on the Dimension Floor: An Opera to the 2014 Whitney Biennial exhibition at the Whitney Museum of American Art.

== Whitney Biennial ==
The Whitney Biennial of contemporary art is an invitation-only exhibition which generally favors young artists and in the past helped bring greater recognition to artists like Georgia O'Keeffe, Jackson Pollock and Jeff Koons. The Whitney Museum bills the event as: "...the longest-running survey of American art, and ...a hallmark of the Museum since 1932." The Biennial has often faced criticism over issues of privilege, access and inclusivity. The 2014 edition was especially controversial for many issues, including the Yams Collective.

== Yams Collective ==
The group started after one of the initial curation visits for the 2014 edition of the Biennial. One of the Biennial's co-curators, Michelle Grabner, had visited Sienna Shields in her studio and seen a short video loop the artist had made with friends dancing in front of glaciers in Alaska. Shields organized the Yams Collective (short for HowDoYouSayYaminAfrican?) of 38 international mostly black and queer musicians, poets, actors, writers and visual artists to create a digital film about racial identity for the 2014 edition. Shields in part organized the collective to address representation in the New York art scene: "I’d go to art events, and I’d be the only black person in the room — here in New York. It was ridiculous." This became the instigation for the collective's submission, a 53-minute digital piece in 35 parts titled Good Stock on the Dimension Floor: An Opera. This participation was seen by the collective as an "infiltration" of the institutional art world and the very size of the collective was meant partly as a protest against tokenism.

== Donelle Woolford controversy ==
Despite the collective's diverse membership, one of only two individual black female artists invited that year was "Donelle Woolford", a creation of Joe Scanlan. Scanlan, a white, male, Princeton University professor hired a succession of actresses to play "Woolford" at events. The inclusion of this "fake" artist led the Yams Collective to withdraw their submission, objecting to "Woolford's" inclusion in a show alongside their work. Shields explained the withdrawal was due to not only Scanlan but also: "...the history of the Whitney and its lack of any kind of initiative in changing its white supremacist attitudes." The collective also considered the inclusion of Scanlan to be a reflection of larger issues of racism in the elite art world. The film instead premiered at the Trinidad and Tobago Film Festival.

== See also ==
- Artivism
- Protest art
