= Becco =

Becco may refer to:

- Becco di Mezzodì, a mountain in Veneto, Italy
- Becco Lake, a lake in Bergamo, Lombardy, Italy
- Becco, West Virginia, United States, an unincorporated community

== See also ==
- Pizzo del Becco, a mountain in Lombardy, Italy
- Karel Dujardin (1626–1678), also known as Barba di Becco, Dutch painter
