= Philip Nord =

American historian

- Awards: Guggenheim Fellowship (2005)

Academic background
- Education: Columbia University (BA, PhD); Balliol College, Oxford (B.Phil)

Academic work
- Discipline: French history
- Institutions: Princeton University

Philip G. Nord is an American historian specializing in the political and cultural history of modern France. He is the Rosengarten Professor of Modern and Contemporary History (Emeritus) at Princeton University. He is a 2005 recipient of the Guggenheim Fellowship.

== Biography ==
Nord graduated from Columbia University in 1971 and studied at Balliol College, Oxford on a Kellett Fellowship to study politics, receiving a B.Phil. in 1973. He began teaching at Princeton University in 1981 and received his Ph.D. from Columbia in 1982.

He received a Guggenheim Fellowship in 2005 to finish research on a book examining the remaking of the French state at the Liberation, which was published in 2010 under the title France’s New Deal: From the Thirties to the Postwar Era.

Nord has held visiting professorships at Sciences Po, Paris 1 Panthéon-Sorbonne University, Paris Nanterre University, School for Advanced Studies in the Social Sciences, Martin Luther University of Halle-Wittenberg, and European University Institute.
