= Becco Lake =

Lake in Lombardy, Italy

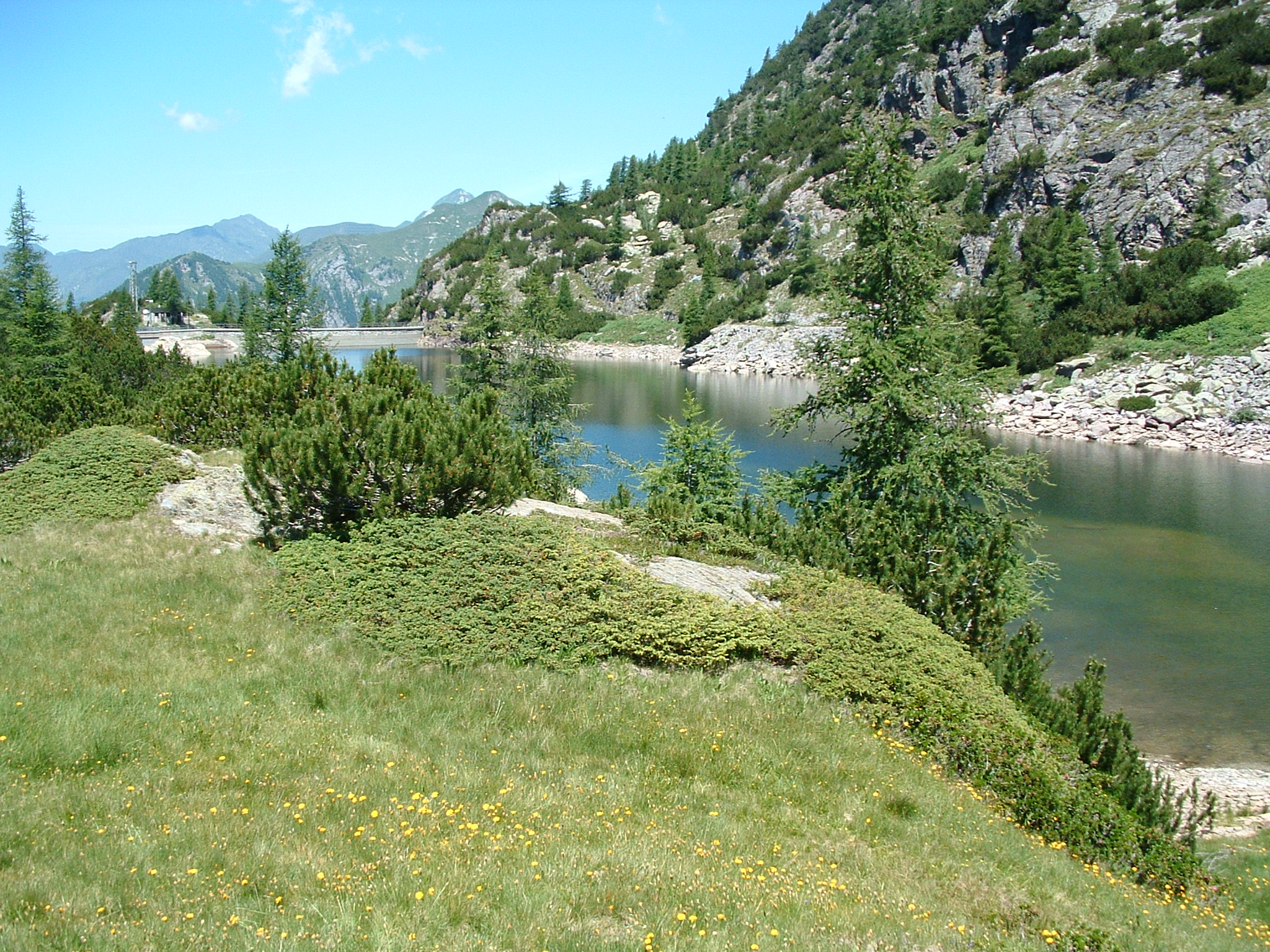

- Location within Lombardy
- Location: Province of Bergamo, Lombardy
- Coordinates: 46.003°N 9.791°E
- Basin countries: Italy
- Surface elevation: 1,872 m (6,142 ft)

Becco Lake is a lake in the Province of Bergamo, Lombardy, Italy.
