= Christine Osinski =

American photographer (born 1948)

- Born: Chicago, Illinois
- Education: Art Institute of Chicago and Yale University
- Occupation(s): Artist and photographer
- Awards: Guggenheim Fellowship
- Website: https://www.christineosinski.com/

Christine Osinski (born 1948) is an American photographer. Osinski was born in Chicago, Illinois and was educated at the Art Institute of Chicago, and received a M.F.A. degree from Yale University. Osinski is noted for her photographs of Staten Island in the 1980s.

Her work is included in the collections of the New Britain Museum of American Art, Light Work, the Museum of Modern Art, New York, and the Museum of Fine Arts Houston.

== Professional career ==
Osinski currently works as an associate professor of art, as well as the director of academic advisement, at Cooper Union. She has lectured at Yale, Rutgers, Pratt, and Parsons, and her works have been exhibited at the Museum of Modern Art, the Bronx Council on the Arts, the Light Gallery, and at Jinhshan Tushuguan in China. She has received grants from the Staten Island Council of the Arts and New York State Council of the Arts. In addition, she has had works at the Museum of the City of New York, the Smithsonian, and the Museum of Fine Arts in Houston. She has been published in Newsday, American Photographer, The Village Voice, and Doubletake.

In 2005, Osinski became a Guggenheim Fellow and in 2015 she received a grant from the Pollock-Krasner Foundation.

== Staten Island Photographs ==
Osinski's New York Photographs project began in 1997 as an attempt to catalogue the various islands in the New York City area, with a particular focus on Staten Island. She also worked on other projects while on Staten Island, including Birth of Venus, which included images of synchronized swimmers. An archive of her photographs is available at the College of Staten Island Library's special collections.

In 2016, Osinski published a collection of her Staten Island photographs as a book titled Summer Days Staten Island.
