= Dante Minniti =

Argentine astronomer (born 1962)

Dante Minniti, PhD
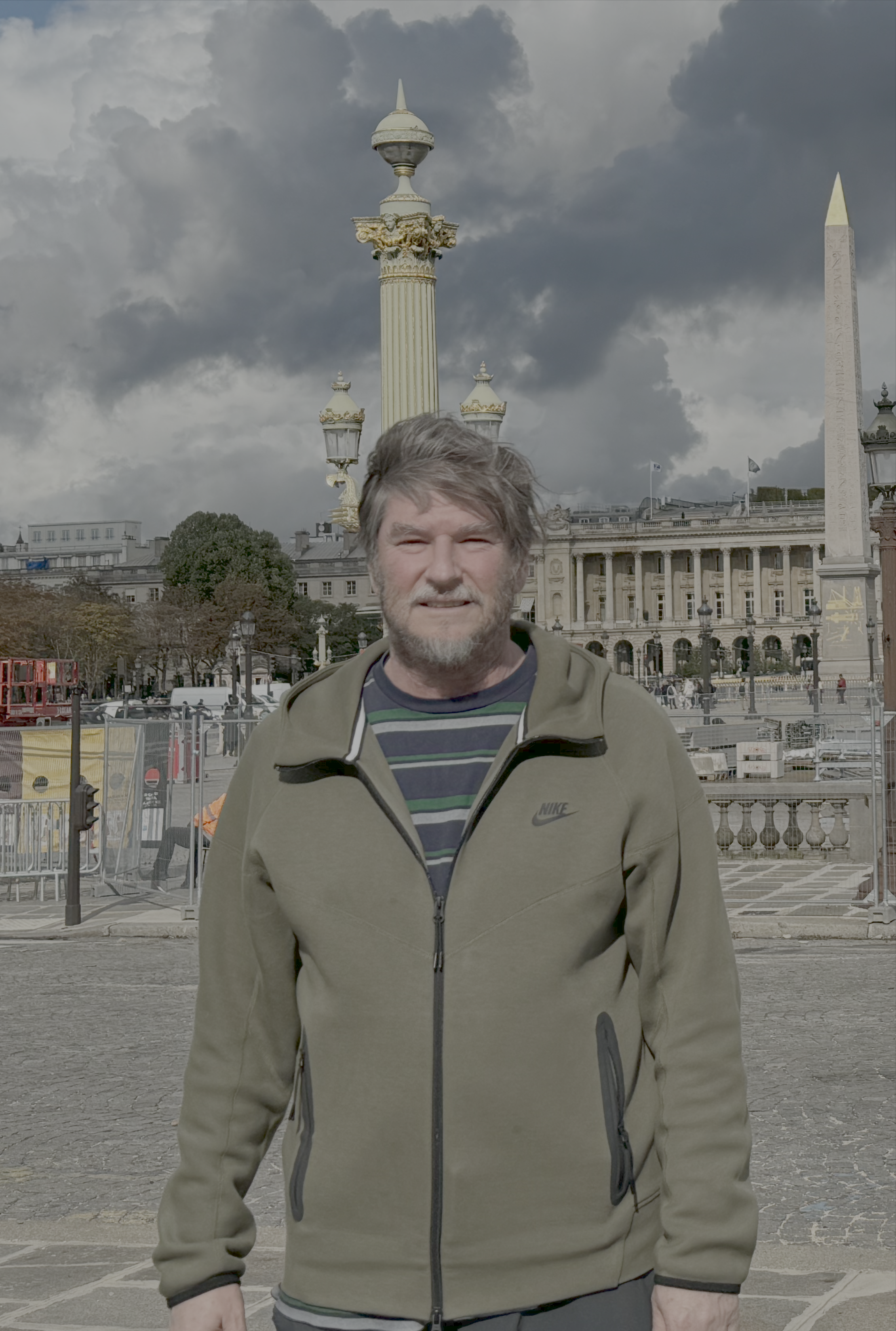
- Dante in 2024
- Born: 1 December 1962 (age 63); Santa Fe, Argentina
- Education: University of Arizona
- Spouse: Joyce Pullen Urzúa
- Children: Marco, 1997; Bruno, 1999; Sofia, 2001
- Parent(s): Nydia del Barco, Edgardo Minniti
- Relatives: Horacio Minniti (brother)
- Awards: John Simon Guggenheim Fellowship, 2005; Scopus Prize in Physics and Astronomy, 2008; Corresponding Academic in Chile of the Academia Nacional de Ciencias de Buenos Aires, 2024
- Scientific career
- Workplaces: European Southern Observatory, Garching, Germany; Lawrence Livermore National Laboratory, USA; Pontificia Universidad Católica de Chile; Universidad Andrés Bello, Chile
- Thesis: Kinematics and stellar populations of the galactic bulge (1993)
- Doctoral advisor: Profs. Edward Olszewski, Jim Liebert and Simon White
- Website: https://vvvsurvey.org/dante/

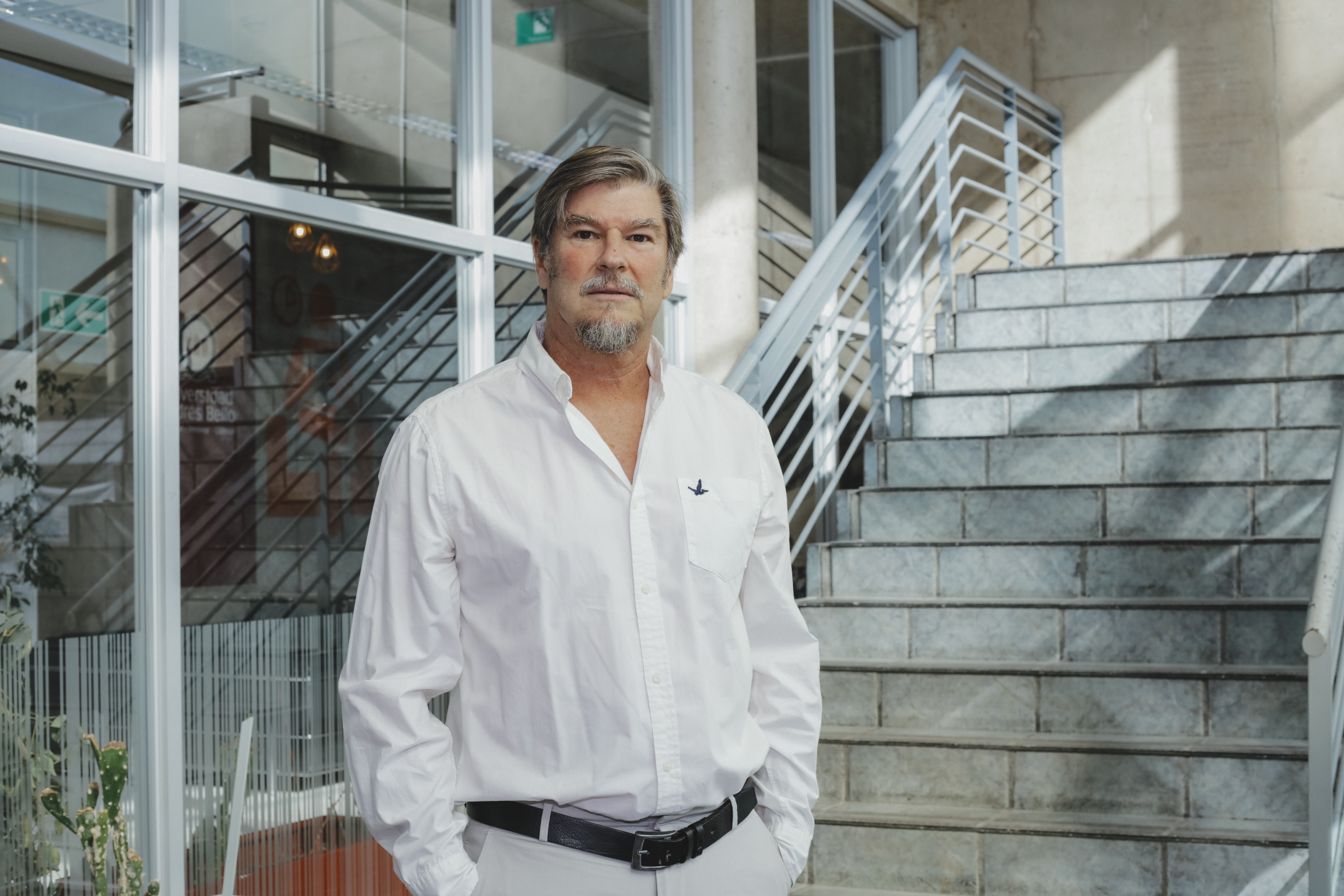
Dante Minniti at IA-UNAB

'Dante' Minniti (born December 1, 1962) is an Argentinian astronomer. He has devoted his career to the study of stellar populations, stellar evolution, globular clusters, galaxy formation, gravitational microlensing, exoplanets and astrobiology. He has been member of the SuperMACHO Team since 2001 and co-leader of both the VVV Survey and VVVX Survey alongside Phil Lucas since 2006. He has also supervised 14 PhD students, 11 Master Students, and 17 Postdocs. He is full professor and was the first director of the Astronomy Institute at Andrés Bello National University (UNAB), Chile.

He has published over 600 papers in peer reviewed journals, yielding an H-index of 89, with more than 33.000 citations.

His non refereed publications include 18 papers in 'The Messenger' (ESO) since 1995, such as 'Behind the Scenes of the Discovery of Two Extrasolar Planets: ESO Large Programme 666' dedicated to the hunt of sub-stellar objects (exoplanets and brown dwarfs), stretching the limits of what was possible with the VLT by 2006, started the planet hunting for many promising candidates from OGLE. 78 publications on the American Astronomical Society, (1992 to 2014), 43 Telegrams on The Astronomer's Telegram (2006–2021), 37 publications on the Astronomical Society of the Pacific Conference Series, 37 Proceedings of the International Astronomical Union such as 'Stellar variability in the VVV survey: overview and first results' 2014, 'Massive infrared clusters in the Milky Way' 2017, 'The SuperMACHO Microlensing Survey' 2005 Proceedings of the International Astronomical Union, Volume 2004, Issue IAUS225, July 2004, pp. 357 – 362.

He also has written books for the general public such as 'Mundos Lejanos' (Ediciones B Chile, 2007 ISBN 9563040392, 9789563040395), 'Vistas de la Galaxia' along with Joyce Pullen and Ignacio Toledo and 'Nuevos Mundos' along with Juan José Clariá (ISBN 9789876022941), in addition to editing a number of specialised books. He is active in outreach activities, such as public talks and press interviews.

== Early life and education ==
Dante spent his childhood in Santa Fe, Argentina where he was born. He attended school at the Escuela Provincial No. 19 and his summer holidays were spent at the grandparent's house in San Javier, a nearby village where his great grandfather Angelo Minniti, settled at the beginnings of the XX th century, coming originally from Guardavalle, Provinzia di Catanzaro, Italy.

His undergraduate studies were done at Universidad Nacional de Córdoba, Argentina, where he obtained his Licenciatura degree and started a long-life collaboration with Professor Juan José Clariá. In 1986 he attended the first Vatican Observatory Summer School (VOSS) at Castel Gandolfo, Vatican State. The school was about 'The Structure and Dynamics of Galaxies', with lectures from Vera Rubin, Martin McCarthy and Dave Latham.

In 1988 with the mentorship of Fr. George Coyne and the support of the Vatican Observatory, he obtained the first 'Father Martin McCarthy' scholarship to carry out his graduate studies at the Department of Astronomy and Steward Observatory of the University of Arizona, where he obtained his PhD in 1993 with his thesis work on 'Kinematics and stellar populations of the galactic bulge' with Profs. Edward Olszewski, Jim Liebert and Simon White as doctoral advisors.

Minniti obtained another PhD at the Universidad Nacional de Córdoba, Argentina in 1998, working on "Metal Poor Globular Clusters in the Milky Way" with Prof. Juan José Clariá as supervisor. Between 1993 and 1996, he obtained an ESO postdoctoral fellowship at the European Southern Observatory in Garching, Germany and then from the end of 1996 to 1999 an IGPP Fellowship at the Lawrence Livermore National Laboratory (Livermore, California, US).

In 1998 he moved to Chile as professor at the Pontifical Catholic University of Chile, where he became full professor and director of research and doctorate (2010–2012), then in 2014 he was invited to create the doctoral program on astrophysics at Universidad Andrés Bello, where he is full professor and former director of the Institute of Astrophysics.

== Awards and memberships ==
In 2005 he received the John Simon Guggenheim Fellowship for his work on stellar populations.

In 2008 he received the Scopus Prize in Physics and Astronomy.

In 2008 he was appointed as Adjunct Scholar for the Vatican Observatory. That same year, he was also named director of research and doctoral programs at Pontifical Catholic University of Chile (2008–2011).

In 2012 he became Member of the National Academy of Sciences of Argentina.

From 2019 to 2023, he is an associate editor of the refereed journal Astronomy & Astrophysics.

In 2024 he was incorporated as Corresponding Academic in Chile of the Academia Nacional de Ciencias de Buenos Aires

He served (2019–2021) as president of IAU Commission H1 'The Local Universe', where he is still an active member, as well as member of Division B: Facilities, Technologies and Data Science, Division F: Planetary Systems and Astrobiology, Division H: Interstellar Matter and Local Universe, Division B: WG Time Domain Astronomy, as well as past affiliations to 27 divisions or commissions since 2003 and IAU member since 1994.

Other memberships:

- Sociedad Chilena de Astronomía, founding member, 2000–present.
- Nexus for Exoplanet System Science (NExSS), NASA NAI, member 2015–present
- American Astronomical Society, member 1991-1998.
- Astronomical Society of the Pacific, member 1989-1998.
- Asociación Argentina de Astronomía, member since 1985.

He has served on numerous scientific committees, including the ESO Scientific and Technology Committee, the ESO Observing Proposals Committee, and the Gemini International Telescope Allocation Committee. He has been referee for major Astronomy journals and national and international funding organizations.

== Research ==
From his early career, he has worked on the structure of galaxies, stellar populations, variable stars, microlensing events, globular cluster evolution, the Milky Way structure and dynamics, exoplanets, and astrobiology.

In the Milky Way he has studied the ages of stellar populations, the evolution of globular clusters, the stellar initial mass function, variable stars such as RR Lyrae, Cepheids and Miras, microlensing events, novae, and the unknown stellar objects named WITs (What Is This?) (Minniti et al. 2019, Lucas et al. 2020, Saito et al. 2021, Smith et al. 2021).

== Early years ==
From his experience at VOSS 1986 and his two PhD thesis (1993 and 1998), Minniti started his career as a professor (1998) with experience on kinematics and stellar populations of the Milky Way and on metallicities of globular clusters that yielded on a particular interest in the composition, evolution, dynamics, and kinematics of the Milky Way. These interests required tools such as metallicity, age and distance indicators, such as RR Lyrae, Cepheids and Miras in the context of smaller structures such as open and globular clusters, so Prof. Minniti started with a particular interest, the Milky Way, and a broad set of knowledge that fostered investigation on adjacent topics such as microlensing with the SuperMACHO project and then with the VVV Survey, which also conveyed all his other interests.

== Microlensing ==
As a follow-up of the MACHO project, SuperMACHO aim was to search for microlensing events towards the Large Magellanic Cloud using the CTIO 4m Blanco telescope and the MOSAIC imager (LMC) to identify the type of population that causes the excessive microlensing rate that the MACHO study observed. To evaluate the differential microlensing rate over the LMC face, SuperMACHO observation approach has been refined, discovering that while this derivative is highly discriminant between Galactic halo and LMC self-lensing, it is largely insensitive to the specifics of the LMC's internal structure. Real-time microlensing alerts and photometric and spectroscopic followup debuted in 2003, retrieving several dozen microlensing candidates with preliminary light curves and related data along with the many dozen microlensing candidates extracted. One observation is the belief that the SNe background behind the LMC is a significant contamination, similar to the MACHO project, and this background has not been eliminated from SuperMACHO single-color candidate sample. Finally, they tailored a follow-up method to distinguish between SNe and real microlensing.

With the VVV Survey data, while supervising Gabriela Navarro on her PhD thesis, they discovered more than 600 microlensing events on the galactic bulge plane on a span of 5 years of observations, with the different cadence of days between observations that had the disadvantage of losing some events of short time scale, but also letting the detection of long time scale events.

== Variability and Transcients ==
On variability, along with collaborator Roberto K. Saito, has named as 'WIT' (acronym for What is This) new kinds of variable stars or extreme transients that do not fit any known standards but indicate astronomical processes that cause variability of different nature, like large amplitude declines, or large-amplitude outbursts followed by apparently constant quiescent states. These sources faded nearly 7 magnitudes in one year and so on.

VVV-WIT-07 is a strange star with seemingly random brightness variations of unknown nature. Some variability aspects resemble the Boyjianian's star or a Mamajek's object, which are very rare, with proposed explanations ranging from eclipses by a cometary system or misaligned disks, to the presence of a Dyson sphere.

VVV-WIT-08 exhibits another unexplained variability. This normal red giant star suffered a single episode with symmetric brightness change. The eclipse like episode does not fit any known phenomena, being too long and deep. The "giant that blinked" (coined by Leigh Smith) may be a distant red supergiant eclipsed by an inclined dust disk.

With the VVV Survey, he has delivered catalogues of thousands of RR Lyrae, along them, a thousand on the Galactic Center. These are old and metal-poor Population II stars, demonstrating that the nuclear region of the Galaxy is very old.

Classical Cepheids trace the young and metal-rich Population I stars. They were able to detect them well beyond the galactic center (because the interstellar medium is more transparent to the infrared light), and they could trace the structure of the far side of the Milky Way.

Miras, very luminous distance indicators with long periods from 100 to 1000 days are also detectable with the 12 year baseline (more than 4000 days) of the VVV and VVVX observations.

== Milky Way ==
Along the 3D structure traced by different age indicators such as RR Lyrae and Cepheids mainly, there was another structure to explore, that is the center of the galaxy composed by a bar and a bulge, first there was to tell if the bulge was an elliptical or peanut shape, then the size of the bar and if it was tilted, twisted or none. Then it was needed to judge how both components interact with each other.

== Exoplanets and Astrobiology ==
On exoplanets and astrobiology he has contributed with the inspection and refinement of exoplanet detection methods such as radial velocities, the detection of GJ 832c, a super-Earth orbiting the edges of the habitable zone of GJ 832, the understanding of temperate planetary atmospheres and an interesting work with Valentin Ivanov and collaborators entitled 'A qualitative classification of extraterrestrial civilizations' intended to the improve the design of strategies for the search of extraterrestrial civilizations.

== Research with VVV/VVVX Survey ==
As P.I. of the VVV Survey and eXtended version VVVX, Dante developed his research on the scientific goals of the VVV and VVVX, publishing more than 160 papers on subjects such as Variable Stars, Extinction Law, Open Clusters, Globular Clusters, Photometric and astrometric catalogues, Milky Way structure, big data, automated tools, YSOs, WITs, stellar populations, survival on the extreme environment like the Galactic center, and produced near-IR catalogues of over 2 x 10^9 sources from which 10^7 are variable.

VVV also completed the census for galaxies beyond the bulge and southern disk of the Milky Way and detected an overdensity of galaxies.

== The VVV Survey and Extended Version VVVX ==
By 2006, The European Southern Observatory made a call for public survey proposals for the newcomer telescope VISTA (Visible and Infrared Survey Telescope for Astronomy) and it's infrared instrument VIRCAM (VISTA Infrared Camera).

Prof. Minniti's proposal was the observation of variability in the Milky Way Bulge and Prof. Philip Lucas, a British astronomer working with UKIDSS, a similar telescope as VISTA but based at the summit of Mauna Kea in Hawaii, that had been observing the northern disk of the Milky Way submitted his proposal for this ESO call consisting on an analogous survey for the southern disk of the Milky Way. Both science goals were very similar, so ESO encouraged Dante and Phil to team up with a unified proposal for the Bulge and Southern Disk of the Milky Way, which resulted on the VVV Survey and was awarded a total of 1929 hours of observation in 192 nights over the lapse of 5 years and upon 520 sq. deg.

The VISTA telescope was on the making and was due to begin operations in 2010, when observations finally begun. The total number of hours executed were 2205.

The Milky Way bulge and a nearby region of the mid-plane, where star formation activity is intense, began being scanned by the public ESO near-IR variability survey 'Vista Variables in the Via Lactea' (VVV) in 2010, mapping repeatedly most of the Milky Way bulge, as well as the inner southern disk. One of the science objectives was using RR Lyrae stars, well-known distance markers, to construct a three-dimensional map of the Bulge.

A total of 33 known globular clusters and 350 open clusters were included in the initial target lists of observations with the 4-m VISTA telescope at ESO Paranal, over five years (2010–2014), covering 10^9 point sources over a region of 540 sq. deg. A deep near-IR atlas with five passbands (0.9-2.5 microns on the Z, Y, J, H, Ks bands) and a list of more than 10^6 variable point sources was the planned result. The VVV variable star survey would allow the development of a 3-D map of the investigated region using well-understood distance markers, such as Cepheids and RR Lyrae stars, in contrast to single-epoch surveys, which typically produce 2-D maps. VVV provided crucial data on the populations' ages. For a thorough knowledge of the variable sources in the inner Milky Way, the observations were integrated with data from MACHO, OGLE, EROS, HST, VST, Spitzer, Chandra, WISE, INTEGRAL, XMM-Newton, Fermi LAT, Gaia, and ALMA. Enabling additional research into the Milky Way's history, the evolution of its globular clusters, a population count of the Galactic Bulge and core, and an examination of the star-forming regions in the disk. The combined variable star catalogues are crucial for theoretical studies of the pulsation characteristics of stars.

== Data Access and Catalogs ==
The VVV Survey data products are public. The data provides a tool for the study of the structure, content, and star formation history of the Milky Way Galaxy, as well as for investigations into recently discovered star clusters, star forming regions in the disk, high proper motion stars, asteroids, planetary nebulae, and other interesting objects. They also provide a unique dataset to map the stellar populations in the Galactic bulge and the adjacent southern plane.

VVV's open survey catalogues are made public and accessible to the entire community through the ESO archive and through ESO Archive Science Portal, under ESO programme ID 179.B-2002.

The VVV catalogues are also available through the University of Edinburgh's Institute for Astronomy's Wide Field Astronomy Unit (WFAU), the Cambridge Astronomical Survey Unit (CASU) and at the Centre de Données astronomiques de Strasbourg (CDS) through VIZIER and through ALADIN desktop application.

== An Ongoing Survey, The VVVX ==
In 2015, at the verge of the end of VVV observations, Prof. Minniti called for a meeting at The Vatican Observatory, Castelgandolfo, Vatican State; named 'Vatican VVV Workshop' from 19 to 21 May 2015. The aim was to design a new proposal that would yield further knowledge of the Milky Way due to the extension of commission of the VIRCAM. The output was a proposal for observing a broader area around the original VVV observing area of 1.700 sq. deg. (4% of the sky).

The proposal was submitted to ESO and advocated at the meeting "Rainbows on the Southern Sky: science and legacy value of the ESO Public Surveys and Large Programmes" at ESO Garching, from October 5 to 9th, 2015. On about five talks the legacy, the main results and the ongoing investigations of the VVV Survey were presented and the forecoming science that were to be reached if the eXtended VVV Survey (VVVX) proposal was accepted. Finally, the VVVX was granted 2000 hours of observation on an area of about 1700 sq. deg. consisting of 1028 VIRCAM 'tiles' (a tile is an area of 1.5 square degrees on the sky covered by a single observation). The observations were restricted from the original five VVV Survey passbands in the infrared (Z, Y, J, H, Ks) to three bands (J, H, Ks) for deeper observations and to optimize the multi-epoch observations. The VVVX observations were conducted from 2016 to early 2023 and the total hours of observation executed were about 4.000.

The VIRCAM in being replaced by 4MOST spectroscopic survey instrument starting in 2023.

== VVV and VVVX Legacy ==
The VVV Survey and its extended version, the VVVX, since the first proposal submission to the final data release (which will be two years before the end of observations in October 2022) will have lasted 18 years (2006 to 2024), with 14 years of observations (2010 to 2023).

By mid-2023 there are more than 330 refereed papers from members of The VVV Science Team 70 of them from authors outside The VVV Science Team and more than 340 non-refereed papers from authors both within and outside the VVV Science Team.

By the end of 2023, 15 graduate students obtained their PhD, and 10 graduate students obtained their MsC, with theses based on VVV/VVVX Survey observations.

=== The catalogues published by ESO at present (2022) are ===
VVV/VIRAC: proper motion catalog

VVV: Catalogue of Variables in the Via Lactea

VVV: Multi-Epoch Ks-Band Photometry in the Via Lactea

VVV: ZYJHKs Catalogue in the Via Lactea

And data releases:

DR1 until October 2010

DR2 until October 2011

DR3 until October 2013

DR4 until October 2015
