= Guohua Li =

Chinese epidemiologist, poet and translator (born 1963)

Guohua Li (李国华/李國華; born 1963) is a Chinese-American epidemiologist who holds the Mieczyslaw Finster Professorship of Epidemiology in Anesthesiology at Columbia University Vagelos College of Physicians and Surgeons and Columbia University Mailman School of Public Health. He is considered a pioneer in injury epidemiology and prevention.

Li was born and raised in rural Hubei. He earned medical qualifications at Peking University in 1984, completed a master's degree at Huazhong University of Science and Technology in 1987, then obtained a Doctor of Public Health degree at Johns Hopkins University in 1993.

Li has published Beauty That Is Never Old, a collection of American poems translated to Mandarin, as well as Gorman Ponds: A Haiku Journal, of his original poetry.
