= William Gallacher (footballer) =

Scottish footballer

Personal information
- Place of birth: Dalmuir, Scotland
- Position(s): Inside forward

Senior career*
Years	Team	Apps	(Gls)
- Renton
1919–1920	Burnley	4	(0)
- *Club domestic league appearances and goals

William Gallacher was a Scottish professional association footballer who played as an inside forward. He played four games for Burnley in the English Football League in the 1919–20 season.
