= Debbie Fleming Caffery =

American photographer (born 1948)

Debbie Fleming Caffery (born 1948) is an American photographer, known internationally for her documentary work of Louisiana.

Her work is held by the George Eastman Museum, the Museum of Contemporary Photography, the Museum of Modern Art, the New York Public Library, the Smithsonian American Art Museum, the Harvard Art Museums, and many other museums.
