= Henriette Darricarrère =

Born in Northern France, Henriette Darricarère was a ballerina, musician, and muse for the painter Henri Matisse. Darricarère was discovered at age nineteen in the Victorine Studios in Nice by Henri Matisse, for whom she modeled until she married.

From 1920 to 1927 Darricarère was Matisse's most important model. Matisse is said to have "liked her natural dignity, the graceful way her head sat on her neck and, above all, the fact that her body caught the light like a sculpture." Darricarère is known for her odalisque poses, often with her arms raised or folded behind her head. ‘These are remarkable poses to hold for 10 hours at a time — and then 10 hours the next day too,’ comments Matisse's biographer Hilary Spurling ‘But she was extraordinarily patient and had terrific stamina.’ This specialty pose was discovered by accident after a carnival party attended by Matisse and his daughter.; after the fancy-dress party the girls posed for the artist in costume. Spurling writes that 'Henriette was so receptive’ to this act of dressing up that Matisse would not have gone on to paint the ‘Odalisques’ had she responded differently. Spurling contends that ‘It was very much an equal partnership between the two of them'. With Darricarère, Matisse reached the apogee of his preoccupation with the odalisque in 'Decorative Figure On an Ornamental Ground' (1926).

This tradition of harem painting is being rigorously problematised by modern spectators and art historians. Wheaton College professor Ellen McBreen writes in the catalogue of the Matisse in the Studio,' exhibition she helped to organise in 2017, that the cultural interchange one sees in these paintings was “made possible by larger political structures, such as colonialism, which in turn made African and North African culture accessible to Matisse in the first place. Needless to say, there would have been no West and Central African sculpture to study or collect in Paris in the early 20th century without European colonists invading those lands: African art was the spoils of this war.” Greg Cook writes that "In Matisse’s art, this larger colonial context that he’s working within becomes most troubling when it’s reflected in paintings depicting European sex fantasies featuring the conquered peoples." Tongue in cheek, Cook asks his readers "Is It Still OK To Like Matisse’s Harem Fantasy Paintings?"

A consummate violinist, like Matisse with whom she would play duets, Darricarère had planned to start a musical career at a concert in Nice, however her experience of acute stage fright dissuaded her. Even though the performance in Nice was exceptionally well regarded she vowed never to perform again. Matisse, who had ensured that she could keep up music and dance lessons while she was working for him, decided to help her wish to have a backup career and taught her how to paint. These lessons are the subject of both 'The Morning Session' (1924) and 'The Three O'Clock Sitting' (1924). Darricarère successfully submitted some of her own work to the annual Salon des Indépendants in Paris, where one of her paintings was immediately purchased.

This emphasis on Darricarère's backup plan mirrors a crisis moment in Matisse's own life, when he feared that he was going blind and turned his attention to the violin as a kind of career insurance policy.
