= Billy Gallagher (chef) =

South African chef and businessman

- Born: August 7, 1948; Newcastle, United Kingdom
- Died: May 19, 2016 (aged 67); Johannesburg, South Africa
- Occupations: Chef; Businessman
- Known for: Being president of the World Association of Chefs Societies, The Billy Gallagher Foundation

Billy Gallagher (17 August 1948 – 19 May 2016) was a chef and businessman in South Africa.

After having worked at The Dorchester in London, Gallagher arrived in South Africa in 1973 to take up an executive sous-chef position with local hotel chain Southern Sun.

In 1982, Gallagher was elected president of the South African Chefs Association (SACA), and held that position for 21 years before becoming its honorary life president in 2003. In 1996, he became president of the World Association of Chefs Societies (WACS), and in 2000 its honorary life president.

In 2000 he survived an attempted hijacking, which left him paralyzed as a quadriplegic.

From 2004 he was Director of Communication and PR for the Southern Sun Hotel Group in Johannesburg; from 2005, executive director for the Centre for Culinary Excellence in Johannesburg, and from 2006, Chairman of the School for Tourism and Hospitality Studies in Johannesburg.

Gallagher earned a Doctorate of Culinary Arts from the Johnson & Wales University, Miami.
