= Jin Lee =

American photographer and educator (born 1961)

- Born: 1 March 1961 (age 65); Seoul, Korea
- Education: Wellesley College
- Known for: Photography
- Movement: Landscape photography

Jin Lee (born 1961) is a photographer and educator who has exhibited throughout the United States. Her work is engaged in "the sensuous experience of a place. Her photographs are in part a highly personal investigation of the city where she lives and the surrounding natural environments."

== Academic career ==
Jin Lee earned a BA (1983) in political science at Wellesley College in Wellesley, Massachusetts, and earned an MFA (1988) in photography at The School of the Art Institute of Chicago. She is currently a professor of photography at Illinois State University in Normal, Illinois.

== Exhibitions ==
Lee works in clearly defined but conceptually related projects that focus on the subtle but moving affect of Midwestern landscapes, both natural and manmade. For example, the Prairie project turns native grasses into towering specimens by shooting them from a low angle, whereas the Small Mountains project captures the relative grandeur of road salt stockpiles used by the Department of Transportation to de-ice winter roads. A third project, Great Water, is an ongoing chronicle of Lake Michigan shot from the same exact vantage point over a period of five years.

Lee has mounted solo museum exhibitions at The Chicago Cultural Center twice (2001 and 2021), the Museum of Contemporary Photography, Chicago (2003), the Sioux City Art Center, Iowa (2004), The Notebeart Nature Museum, Chicago (2009), and the Illinois State University Galleries, Normal (2010). Her ongoing project, Train Views, chronicles scenes from her commute between Chicago and Normal, Illinois, since 2012. She is represented by Devening Projects in Chicago.

== Awards ==
- John Simon Guggenheim Fellowship, (2005)
- Creative Time Artist Grant, (2002)
- MacDowell Colony Artist Fellow, (2001)
- Yaddo Artist Fellow, (1998)
