= Tricia McLaughlin =

American artist (born 1964)

- Born: January 29, 1964 (age 62); Bryn Mawr, Pennsylvania, U.S.

Tricia McLaughlin (born January 29, 1964) is a New York City-based American visual artist whose works in animation, sculpture and painting often deal with the themes of fantastic or impossible architecture and their impact on potential inhabitants. Her work has been exhibited throughout the US, as well as in the UK, Valencia, Spain, Berlin, Germany, Cyprus, South Korea, and Kyoto, Japan, and she is a recipient of the Guggenheim and a New York Foundation for the Arts grants.

== Education ==
McLaughlin studied painting and computer graphics at Syracuse University, and after earning her BFA there, volunteered for the Peace Corps. From 1987 to 1989, she was assigned to the community of Uvita de Osa in Costa Rica, and worked for the Peace Corps' Women in Development program there, supervising programs in the development of cottage industries and increasing literacy, as well as starting the area's first women's futbol league.

In 1992, she attended the Skowhegan School of Painting and Sculpture in Skowhegan, Maine, on their fellowship. She earned her MFA in Hunter College's Combined Media program in 2000.

== Early career ==
Moving to New York City after the Peace Corps, McLaughlin taught herself computer graphics software while working as a scenic artist for theater and fashion, painting sets for Bill T. Jones, the New York City-based dancer and Anne Klein II campaigns. After spending several years working in the private sector, designing also for magazines, books, CD-ROMs and the Internet, McLaughlin enrolled at Hunter College and earned her there in 2000 and attended a residency at the Banff Centre for the Arts.

== Career ==
Two years out of Hunter's graduate program, McLaughlin had her first solo show at Florence Lynch Gallery in Manhattan. Also in 2002, she participated in group shows at Apexart and White Box Gallery. The next year she had a second solo show at Sixtyseven Gallery in Williamsburg, Brooklyn. In 2004, her work was included in the group show "Screwball", at Vox Populi alternative art space in Philadelphia.

Her art often deals with the themes of fantastic or impossible architecture and its impact on potential inhabitants. She often uses deliberately unrealistic characters in her work such as simplified archetypes and, recently, apes. In 2005, she received a Guggenheim Fellowship for her work in fantasy architecture using 3D-computer design, animation and sculpture.

The next year, she was an artist-in-residence at the Kyoto Art Center in Kyoto, Japan. Also that year, she was commissioned by the City of Virginia Beach Convention Center to install a nine-by-90-foot animation piece, titled "Aquatechture", for a permanent public exhibition, one of the largest video installation projects in the country. She had been selected by the Virginia Beach Arts and Humanities Commission, and concurrently had a showing of her paintings at the Virginia Museum of Contemporary Art.

In 2009 McLaughlin was included in the international Incheon Women Artists' Biennale in Incheon, South Korea, curated by Heng Gil-Han. She presented her four-minute animated short History of the World. The next year, she premiered her series of animations and paintings, "What's She Building in There?", at the Delaware Center for the Contemporary Arts in Wilmington, Delaware. In 2011 she collaborated with writer Mike Edison on a series of videos promoting his book, Dirty! Dirty! Dirty!

== Notable works ==
=== Precision Diving Wheel (2005) ===
The animation, lasting two minutes, is set on a fairground ride. As water scarcity intensifies, advanced survival skills for water acquisition become essential. The depicted Ferris wheel, featuring small pools of water and a high diving board, requires exceptionally precise diving abilities.

=== Virginia Beach Aquatecture (2006) ===
A public art work commissioned by the Virginia Beach Convention Center, based on SeeWorld, and at nine-feet-by-ninety-feet, it is one of the largest video installation projects in the country. In this aquarium, people are trying to structure the fluid movement of water in terms of human reason and geometry—but of course the water subverts any of their work.

== Awards ==
- 2004 Artist's Fellowship for Video from New York Foundation for the Arts
- 2004 Jerome Foundation, Media Arts Grant
- 2005 Guggenheim Fellowship
