= Bruce Cratsley =

American photographer (1944–1998)

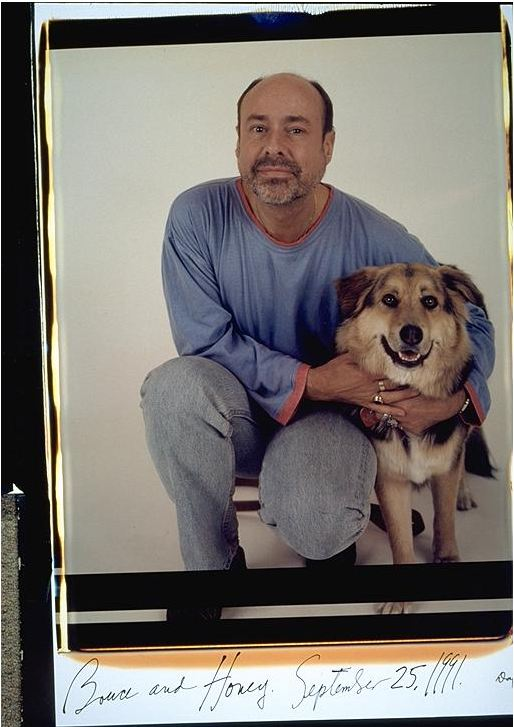
Bruce Cratsley And Honey, by Elsa Dorfman

David Bruce Cratsley (December 24, 1944 – June 30, 1998) was an American photographer specialized in still lifes, portraits of friends, and gay life in New York City. He had a reputation of master of light and shadow.

== Early life ==
David Bruce Cratsley was born in Swarthmore, Pennsylvania on December 24, 1944.

Cratsley attended Swarthmore College, graduating in 1966, and then, in the early 1970s, The New School for Social Research, studying under Lisette Model.

== Career ==
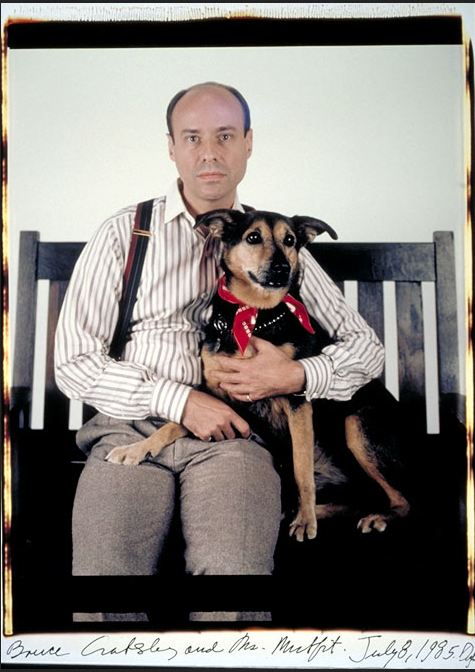
Bruce Cratsley And Mr Muffit, by Elsa Dorfman

Cratsley worked for many years as a gallerist at Marlborough Gallery before quitting in 1986 to become a full-time photographer.

As "Bruce Cratsley", he exhibited in various New York galleries, like: Laurence Miller Gallery, Howard Greenberg Gallery and Witkin Gallery. Cratsley was represented by Yancey Richardson Gallery, a dealer of fine art photography based in SoHo.

In 1978 Cratsley contributed the photo sequences for the musical The Class, performed by The New Ballet School at the New York City Center.

In 1980, Cratsley's work, Atlantic City, 1977, an August beach scene, exhibited at the 11th Anniversary show at the Witkin Gallery, sold for $175.

In 1989 Cratsley was awarded with the Guggenheim Fellowship for Photography, US & Canada.

Cratsley documented his life with David Waine, who died in 1991. "I'd been photographing David since long before he became sick [...] at some point I realized that this was an extraordinary thing that was happening, and that I had an intimate relationship to it. I photographed David just a few hours before he died, not knowing what was about to happen [...] David was very spiritual [...] My pictures are a poetic, spiritualized look at AIDS".

In 1995 Cratsley was included together with Barbara Norfleet, Olivia Parker and John Sturges in the list of bestselling photographer at Robert Klein Gallery, Boston. Cratsley's B&W photos sold quickly at a starting price of $400. Klein said of Cratsley: "Bruce transforms commonplace things through a keen sense of light and composition, and very skilled printing".

Cratsley documented the Lesbian and Gay life, and in particular the New York City LGBT Pride March. Another event he documented was Wigstock, an annual outdoor drag festival that began in the 1980s in Manhattan's East Village that took place on Labor Day. Pictures from both events are now at the New York Public Library, in their permanent collection.

In 1999, Cratsley was included in the volume Desire: contemporary photography from the visual AIDS archive project.

In 2011 a photograph by Cratsley, Louvre Window, Paris, 1980, signed and dated, sold at $300.

On September 15, 2016, Ron Tarver, Swarthmore Instructor of Studio Art and Pulitzer Prize, gave a lecture about Cratsley, Swarthmore graduate, at LPAC (Lang Center for the Performing Arts).

Works by Cratsley are also at the Metropolitan Museum of Art, the Bibliothèque nationale de France and the Harvard Art Museums.

=== Exhibitions ===
- April 1987, Witkin Gallery, with Fay Godwin, Photographs that imply hidden sensations and mysteries.
- April 1992, Goldberg Gallery, B&W portraits, street scenes, figure studies and still lifes.
- July 1993, Howard Greenberg Gallery, with Sabine Weiss, B&W photographs of still life, landscapes and shop windows with mannequins.
- 1994, Motel Gallery, B&W photographs of the New York City Gay and Lesbian Pride Parade taken between 1983 and 1993.
- February 1996, Yancey Richardson Gallery, works from 1976 to 1995, including portraits of friends, images of tabletop arrangements, mannequins in street windows, museum interiors, and drag queens at the June Gay Pride Parade.
- July 1996, By the Sea, Yancey Richardson Gallery, with Milton Avery, Duncan Hannah, Tobi Kahn, Malcolm Morley, Fairfield Porter, David True, Helen Miranda Wilson and others.
- December 1996, Bruce Cratsley: Master of Light and Shadow, Brooklyn Museum; Cratsley referred to the photos as "snapshots, really, though carefully made". They were 22 images that reflected Cratsley's personal experiences with spirituality, life and death. White Light, Silent Shadows, a monograph of Cratsley, was published in 1998 by Arena Editions, few months before Cratsley's death.
- December 1997, Photographs of Paris, Yancey Richardson Gallery, with André Kertész and Todd Webb.
- May 1999, Bruce Cratsley, photographs, Paul Kopeikin Gallery, Los Angeles.
- September 1999, Female, curated by Village Voice photography critic Vince Aletti, Wessel + O'Connor Gallery, with nearly 100 photographers, including gay artists like George Platt Lynes, Cecil Beaton, John Dugdale, Lyle Ashton Harris, Horst P. Horst, Peter Hujar, Bill Jacobson, Hiromitsu Morimoto and Andy Warhol.
- September 2016, Bruce Cratsley: Shifting Identities, List Gallery, Swarthmore College, B&W photographs from 1977 to 1998.
- November–December 2017, Bruce Cratsley : Intimate Light, Gallery Kayafas, Boston MA. 15 Vintage Gelatin Silver Prints, many never published.

== Personal life ==
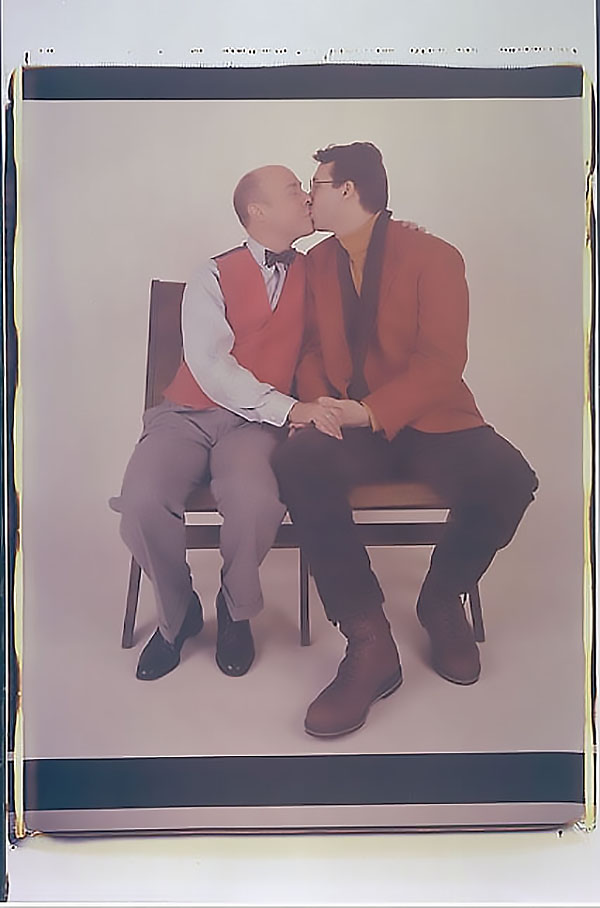
Bruce Cratsley And William Leight, by Elsa Dorfman

David Waine, Cratsley's lover who he often portrayed, died of AIDS-related illness in 1991. At the time of his own death, Cratsley was in a long-term relationship with William Leight.

Cratsley was a good friend of Elsa Dorfman; they met through Cratsley's brother John. "We're long distance friends. The phone. No email. No fax. He's star 90 from every phone in my house and in my studio." Elsa Dorfman

Cratsley died on June 30, 1998, from causes related to HIV/AIDS in New York City.
