= Susan Meiselas =

American photographer (born 1948)

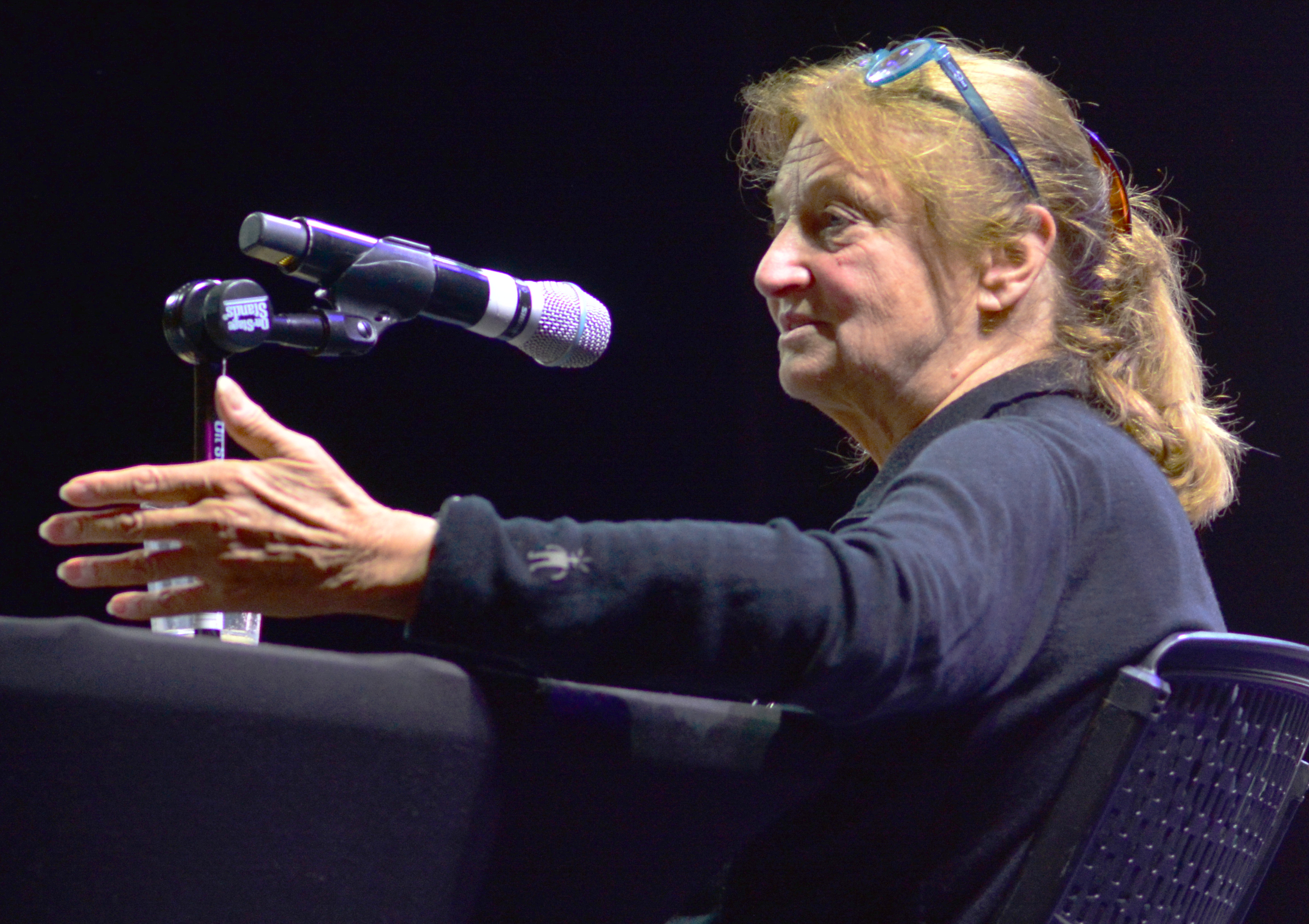
- Meiselas in 2023
- Born: June 21, 1948 (age 78); Baltimore, Maryland, U.S.
- Education: Sarah Lawrence College; Harvard University
- Occupation: Photographer
- Known for: photos of Sandinista National Liberation Front insurgents in the Nicaragua Revolution in the 1970s
- Website: www.susanmeiselas.com

Susan Meiselas (born June 21, 1948) is an American documentary photographer. She has been associated with Magnum Photos since 1976 and been a full member since 1980. Currently she is the President of the Magnum Foundation. She is best known for her 1970s photographs of war-torn Nicaragua and American carnival strippers.

Meiselas has published several books of her own photographs and has edited and contributed to others. Her works have been published in newspapers and magazines including The New York Times, The Times, Time, GEO, and Paris Match. She received the Robert Capa Gold Medal in 1979 and was named a MacArthur Fellow in 1992. In 2006, she was awarded The Royal Photographic Society's Centenary Medal and Honorary Fellowship and in 2019 the Deutsche Börse Photography Foundation Prize.

After a relationship that spanned more than thirty years, she married filmmaker Richard P. Rogers shortly before his death in 2001.

== Early life and education ==
Meiselas was born on June 21, 1948, in Baltimore, Maryland. She attended junior high school in Woodmere, New York. She earned her Bachelor of Arts in 1970 from Sarah Lawrence College and a Master of Arts in visual education from Harvard University, where she was a student of Barbara Norfleet. She received honorary Doctorates in Fine Arts from the Parsons School in 1986 and The Art Institute of Boston in 1996.

== Career ==
After earning her masters degree from Harvard University, Meiselas was an assistant film editor on the Frederick Wiseman documentary Basic Training. From 1972 to 1974, she worked for New York City public schools, running workshops for teachers and children in the Bronx and designing photography curricula for 4th–6th graders. In the mid-1970s, Meiselas began working on a project she later titled the Prince Street Girls, a series that features young and adolescent girls from Little Italy in New York City. She also worked for the State Arts Commissions of South Carolina and Mississippi setting up photography programs in rural schools and served as a consultant to Polaroid and the Center for Understanding Media in New York City.

Her first major photography project documented strippers at New England fairs and carnivals, which she worked on during summers while teaching in the New York City public schools. The project resulted in an exhibition at the Whitney Museum and a book, Carnival Strippers, that incorporated audio interviews with the subjects on a CD packaged with the book.

In the late 1970s, Meiselas documented the insurrection in Nicaragua and human rights issues in Latin America. Her most notable photograph from this project was Molotov Man, which depicts a man (later identified as Pablo 'Bareta' Aruaz) poised to throw a molotov cocktail made from a Pepsi bottle in his right hand, while holding a rifle in his left hand. It became a symbol of the Sandinista revolution and was widely reproduced and remixed in Nicaragua. Latterly, outside this context, it was reproduced via an Internet meme based on Joy Garnett's 2003 painting Molotov, thus becoming a prominent case-study of the appropriation, transformation, and quotation in art. Her photographs of the Nicaraguan Revolution have been incorporated into local textbooks in Nicaragua. Her 1991 documentary film, Pictures from a Revolution, depicts her return to sites she photographed and conversations with subjects of the photographs as they reflect on the images ten years after the war. In 2004, Meiselas returned to Nicaragua to install nineteen mural-size images of her photographs at the locations where they were taken. The project was called "Reframing History."

In 1981, she visited a village destroyed by government forces in El Salvador and took pictures of the El Mozote massacre, working with journalists Raymond Bonner and Alma Guillermoprieto.

Beginning in 1992, Meiselas used MacArthur Foundation funding to curate a photographic history of Kurdistan, resulting in the book Kurdistan: In the Shadow of History and a corresponding website, akaKurdistan.

In a 2008 interview with Phong Bui in The Brooklyn Rail, Meiselas says:

I don't want to relinquish the role and the necessity of witnessing and the photographic act as a response, a responsible response. But I also don't want to assume in a kind of naïve way … that the act of the making of the image is enough. What's enough? And what can we know in this process of making, publishing, reproducing, exposing, and recontextualizing work in book or exhibition form? … I can only hope that it registers a number of questions.

Over several months in 2015 and 2016, Meiselas worked on a project about women in refuges in the Black Country area of the West Midlands, England. The project was made in collaboration with Multistory, a local community arts charity, which published a book of the work, A Room of Their Own (2017).

== Publications ==
=== Publications by Meiselas ===
- Learn to See. USA: Polaroid Foundation, 1975. A collaboration with the Polaroid Corporation.
- Carnival Strippers. USA: Farrar, Straus and Giroux, 1976; Germany: Steidl, 2003. ISBN 978-3-88243-954-0.
- Nicaragua, June 1978 – July 1979. USA: Pantheon, 1981, ISBN 978-0-906495-67-4. New York: Aperture, 2008. ISBN 978-1-59711-071-6.
- El Salvador: The Work of Thirty Photographers. USA: Pantheon, 1983; Writers and Readers, 1983.
- Kurdistan: In the Shadow of History. USA: Random House, 1997. USA: University of Chicago Press, 2008. ISBN 978-0-226-51928-9.
- Pandora's Box. Denmark: Magnum Editions/Trebruk, 2001. ISBN 978-0-9538901-1-8. On S&M in New York.
- Encounters with the Dani. USA/Germany: International Center of Photography/Steidl, 2003. ISBN 978-3-88243-930-4.
- In History: Susan Meiselas. Edited by Kristen Lubben. Text by Meiselas, Caroline Brothers, Edmundo Desnoes, Ariel Dorfman, Elizabeth Edwards and David Levi Strauss. USA/Germany: International Center of Photography/Steidl, 2008. ISBN 978-3-86521-685-4. Published in conjunction with an exhibition.
- Prince Street Girls.
  - Paris: Yellow Magic Books, 2013. Edition of 200 copies.
  - Oakland, CA: TBW Books, 2017. Subscription Series #5, Book #2. ISBN 978-1-942953-28-9. Edition of 1000 copies. Meiselas, Mike Mandel, Bill Burke and Lee Friedlander each had one book in a set of four.
- A Room of Their Own. West Bromwich, England: Multistory, 2017.
- On the Frontline. New York City: Aperture, 2017. Edited by Mark Holborn. ISBN 9781597114271.
- Meditations. Bologna, Italy: Damiani, 2018. ISBN 9788862085694.
- Tar Beach: Life on the Rooftops of Little Italy. Bologna, Italy: Damiani, 2020. ISBN 9788862087223.
- Eyes Open: 23 Photography Projects for Curious Kids. New York: Aperture, 2021. ISBN 9781597114691.

=== Publications edited by Meiselas ===
- Chile From Within. Edited by Meiselas. USA: W.W. Norton, 1993. Photographs by Paz Errazuriz et al. ASIN B001F9BUBS. Texts by Ariel Dorfman and Marco Antonio de la Parra. ISBN 9780393306538.
- Learn to See: A Sourcebook of Photography Projects by Students and Teachers. Edited by Susan Meiselas. Paris, France: delpire & co, 2021. ISBN 9791095821380.

== Films ==
- Living at Risk: The Story of a Nicaraguan Family (1986) – co-directed by Meiselas
- Pictures from a Revolution (1991) – co-directed with Alfred Guzzetti and Richard P. Rogers
- Roses in December (1982)- features Meiselas’ stills of the churchwomen's gravesite.

== Reviews ==
- Wilkinson, Paul (1982), Why Nicaragua?, which includes a review of Nicaragua, June 1978 – July 1979, in Hearn, Sheila G. (ed.), Cencrastus No. 10, Autumn 1982, pp. 45 & 46, ISSN 0264-0856

== Awards ==
- 1978: Robert Capa Gold Medal for "outstanding courage and reporting" by the Overseas Press Club for her work in Nicaragua
- 1982: American Society of Media Photographers Photojournalist of the Year
- 1982: Leica Award for Excellence
- 1985: Engelhard Award from the Institute of Contemporary Art
- 1992: MacArthur Fellowship, John D. and Catherine T. MacArthur Foundation
- 1994: Maria Moors Cabot Prize from Columbia University for her coverage of Latin America
- 1994: Missouri Honor Medal for Distinguished Service in Journalism
- 1994: Hasselblad Award
- 1999: Nederlands Foto Instituut Grant, "Photoworks-in-Progress: Constructing Identity"
- 2005: Infinity Award: Cornell Capa Award, International Center of Photography, New York City
- 2006: Royal Photographic Society's Centenary Medal and Honorary Fellowship (HonFRPS)
- 2011: Harvard Arts Medal, Arts First, Harvard University
- 2015: Guggenheim Fellowship from the John Simon Guggenheim Memorial Foundation
- 2019: Winner, Deutsche Börse Photography Foundation Prize for her retrospective exhibition, Mediations, at Galerie nationale du Jeu de Paume, Paris.
- 2025: Outstanding Contribution to Photography, Sony World Photography Awards, London

== Collections ==
Meiselas' work is held in the following permanent collections:

- Art Institute of Chicago, Illinois
- Birmingham Museum of Art, Alabama
- Fogg Museum, Harvard University, Cambridge, Massachusetts
- George Eastman House, Rochester, NY
- Jewish Museum, New York City
- Library of Congress, Washington DC
- Magnum Photos Collection at the Harry Ransom Center, University of Texas at Austin
- Museum of Contemporary Photography, Chicago, IL
- Museum of Fine Arts, Houston, Texas
- Museum of Modern Art, New York
- Nelson-Atkins Museum of Art, Kansas City, MO
- San Francisco Museum of Modern Art, California
- Whitney Museum of American Art, New York City

== Exhibitions ==
- Susan Meiselas. Mediations, Fundació Antoni Tàpies, Barcelona, 2017; Galerie nationale du Jeu de Paume, Paris, February–May 2018. A retrospective.
- Close Enough: New Perspectives from 12 Women Photographers of Magnum. September 29, 2022 – January 9, 2023, International Center of Photography, New York, New York
