= Molotov Man =

Iconic photograph by Susan Meiselas

The original photograph by Susan Meiselas.

Molotov Man is a photograph taken by Susan Meiselas during the 1979 Nicaraguan Revolution. Famous in its Nicaraguan context as a symbol of the Sandinista revolution, it has been widely reproduced and remixed.

Outside that context, it was reproduced as an Internet meme based on Joy Garnett's 2003 painting Molotov and became a prominent case study of the reuse of art.

The photograph depicts a man, later found to be Pablo "Bareta" Arauz, who is poised to throw a Molotov cocktail, made from a Pepsi bottle, in his right hand while he holds a rifle in his left.

== Original image ==
By Meiselas's account,

I took the picture... in Nicaragua, which had been ruled by the Somoza family since before World War II. The FSLN, popularly known as the Sandinistas, had opposed that regime since the early Sixties. ... I made the image in question on July 16, 1979, the eve of the day that Somoza would flee Nicaragua forever. What is happening is anything but a "riot". In fact, the man is throwing his bomb at a Somoza national guard garrison, one of the last such garrisons remaining in Somoza's hands. It was an important moment in the history of Nicaragua—the Sandinistas would soon take power and hold that power for another decade—and this image ended up representing that moment for a long time to come.

The image was first published in Meiselas's Nicaragua, June 1978 – July 1979.

However, it was subsequently widely reproduced in both pro- and anti-Sandinista propaganda and art. Meiselas herself exhibited the photograph in Nicaragua, along with others from the same collection in 1999, during the 20th anniversary of the revolution.

== Use by Joy Garnett and subsequent controversy ==
=== Initial conflict ===
Molotov
- Artist: Joy Garnett
- Year: 2003
- Medium: Oil on canvas
- Dimensions: 178 cm × 152 cm (70 in × 60 in)
- Location: Private Collection

Joy Garnett's 2004 exhibition Riot featured a series of paintings based on images pulled from mass media sources and depicting figures in "extreme emotional states." One of the paintings, Molotov, was originally sourced from a JPEG of Molotov Man found on the Internet. After the Riot exhibition had closed, Meiselas's lawyer contacted Garnett with a cease and desist letter claiming copyright infringement and "piracy" of Meiselas's photograph. The letter stipulated for her to remove the image from her website, sign a retroactive licensing agreement to transfer all rights to the painting to Meiselas, and credit Meiselas on all subsequent reproductions of Molotov.

Garnett responded to a threat of injunction by removing the image of Molotov from her website. Once the image had been removed from Garnett's website, Meiselas did not pursue the matter further.

=== Joywar ===
Before Garnett had removed the image from her website, the story had been picked up by Rhizome.org. Many of Garnett's peers were following the course of events and were concerned by what they viewed as "one artist using his [sic] copyrights as a way to censor another artist." Referring a legal battle known as Toywar, which had involved similar copyright issues, a group of artists launched a solidarity campaign, called Joywar.

The idea behind Joywar was to demonstrate support for Garnett and protection of fair use by copying the Molotov image and reposting it in as many incarnations as possible. After Garnett announced her decision to remove the original image via the online forums on Rhizome.org, she was notified that one of her peers had already uploaded a mirror site, a copy of Garnett's original webpage, on his own server. Within a week, countless other mirrors were being uploaded. Other users were encouraged to grab the image and to repost it or to appropriate it in their own artwork.

Word of the cause spread quickly throughout the new media blogosphere. The story was soon reposted in French, Italian, Czech, Chinese, Spanish, and Catalan. Derivative works were produced and shared at an exponential rate. They protested Meiselas's claim of copyright infringement and suggested the claim to be a means of controlling what many of Garnett's peers regarded as a creative appropriation protected under fair use. Garnett created an online archive to document the origins, reactions, and critiques surrounding Joywar and the subsequent global proliferation of images spurred by the controversy surrounding Garnett's sampling from Meiselas's photograph.

In April 2006, Garnett and Meiselas were asked to attend the COMEDIES OF FAIR U$E symposium at the New York Institute for the Humanities. Both had met in person for the first time a day earlier, and they gave a side-by-side account of the events surrounding Molotov at the conference. Their presentation was well-received, and an edited transcript was published in Harper's in February 2007.

In the transcript, Meiselas stated that her mission as a photojournalist was to provide a cultural and historical context for the images she captured, which she viewed as fundamentally different from Garnett's goal as an artist to "decontextualize" the images that she appropriates and remediates in paint. Meiselas objected mainly to the removal of her original subject, whom she identifies as "Molotov Man" and was later revealed to be a man, Pablo Arauz, from the context of the photo. She viewed that as disrespectful to the man and believed that to devalue her original work.

Meiselas claimed, "There is no denying in this digital age that images are increasingly dislocated and far more easily decontextualized." Meiselas ultimately believed, "Technology allows us to do many things" but "that does not mean we must do them." Meiselas contened, "I never did sue Joy in the end, nor did I collect any licensing fees. But I still feel strongly, as I watch Pablo Arauz's context being stripped away--as I watch him being converted into the emblem of an abstract riot--that it would be a betrayal of him if I did not at least protest the diminishment of his act of defiance." Others have responded to that, however, by affirming that Pablo Arauz lent his gesture without his knowledge to the Meiselas photograph, which would become the iconic symbol of the triumphant turning point of the Sandinista Revolution. Such critics noted that Meiselas did not mention Pablo Arauz anywhere in her photographic essay, Nicaragua, in which his image, the image of "Molotov Man," first appeared. It was therefore Meiselas who initially stripped him of his identity as Pablo Arauz to convert the figure into an abstract emblem, which necessarily brings up the issue of the suppression of individual identity in the production of a cultural icon.

Garnett, on the other hand, asked, "Who owns the rights to this man's struggle?" She questioned the legitimacy of an artist's right to dictate who can make commentary on their work and what can be said. On one hand, she was concerned with the role that copyright could play in restricting artistic creation and how to preserve rights of ownership but still allow for creative appropriation under terms of fair use. Mainly, however, Garnett was interested in how painting as a metiér can be wielded to engage issues of mass media-generated culture.

That particular case was never taken to court, but similar conflicts have become subject to drawn-out legal battles. Most cases disputing fair use and copyright infringement in appropriation art have been dealt with on a case-to-case basis because much of the legislation on fair use leaves room for interpretation. The recent case establishing precedent was Blanch v. Koons (2005), which was between Andrea Blanch, a commercial photographer, and the artist Jeff Koons. The case was decided in Koons's favor and established that a visual work of art that has incorporated appropriated imagery is sufficiently "transformative" and so is protected as a fair use. That overturned the findings of a 1991 high-profile case, Rogers v. Koons, which involved another instance of Koons being accused of copyright infringement by the author of the sourced image. Koons argued that his work fell under fair use by parody, which was rejected at the time.

== See also ==
- List of photographs considered the most important
