= Morning Diaries =

- by Michal Bat-Adam
- Book cover
- Original title: יומני בוקר, tr. Yomane boḳer
- Illustrator: Michal Bat-Adam; Adam Rubin
- Cover artist: Michal Bat-Adam
- Country: Israel
- Language: Hebrew
- Subject(s): Still photography
- Publisher: Tel Aviv: Keshev Publishing
- Publication date: March 2017
- Media type: Paperback
- Pages: 117
- Size and weight: 21 cms
- ISBN: 9789655312256
- OCLC: 974183300

Morning Diaries (Hebrew: יומני בוקר, tr. Yomane boḳer) is a 2017 Hebrew poem by Israeli filmmaker and actress Michal Bat-Adam, her first venture into the medium. It is accompanied by still photographs taken by Bat-Adam and her late father, Adam Rubin.

== Reception ==
Haaretz critic Yotam Reuveni, who noted the influence of haiku, argued that the book is "incredibly aesthetic," underscored that "it seems to have been written throughout a long period," and, stated that the effect of the poetry and still photography together "creates in one's imagination a cinematic scene," for, he asserted, "the photographs are a transparent reality." He further wrote that the reading created an "experience of sadness, loneliness, and, alienation," and, claimed that the book's themes of domesticity are "very Israeli and very Tel Avivian," as, he further opined, "when one stands before honest, day-to-day, non-mawkish poetry of loneliness, one cannot but identify with it, because this is loneliness without hope for salvation, so, all that remains, is, at the end of the day, to describe reality in a diary." He concluded by saying that "the sadness is tender, the photography even more, and, in the end, the reader takes a deep breath, happy that the poetry touched him and that the encounter with sadness is over."
