= Still photography =

Still photography may refer to:

- Photography
- Still life photography, photographs containing mostly inanimate subject matter, often in small groupings
- Unit still photographer, a person who creates still photographic images for the publicity of films and television programs
- Still frame, a film frame taken from a motion picture
