= Yancey Richardson Gallery =

Art gallery in Manhattan, New York

Coordinates: 40.74762°N 74.00573°W

The Yancey Richardson Gallery is a dealer of fine art photography, based in New York City and founded in 1995 by Yancey Richardson. Formerly housed in the 560 Broadway building in Soho, the gallery moved to New York's Chelsea art district (525 W 22nd) in 2000.

== Yancey Richardson: owner ==
Richardson received a B.A and M.A. from Southern Methodist University, Dallas, Texas, and held the Helena Rubinstein Fellowship in curatorial and critical studies at The Whitney Museum of American Art in 1979. She has served on a variety of boards and committees and has been active in supporting organizations such as the Public Art Fund, the International Center of Photography, and the Renaissance Society. She has moderated panels on contemporary photography for New York University and has been a guest speaker at Christie's Education program. For twelve years she served as Vice President of the Association of International Photography Art Dealers. She lives in New York with her husband and daughter.

== Artists ==
Yancey Richardson's current program includes photographers such as Alex Prager, Zanele Muholi, Victoria Sambunaris, Sharon Core, Mitch Epstein, Laura Letinsky, Andrew Moore, Sebastiao Salgado, Hellen van Meene, August Sander, Ed Ruscha, William Eggleston, and Robert Mapplethorpe.

=== Gallery artists ===
- Olivo Barbieri
- Chan Chao
- Bruce Cratsley
- Mario Cravo Neto
- Mitch Epstein
- Lynn Geesaman
- David Hilliard
- Tom Hunter
- Kenneth Josephson
- Kahn & Selesnick
- Yousuf Karsh
- Lisa Kereszi
- Hiroh Kikai
- Laura Letinsky
- Alex MacLean
- Christopher Makos
- Priscilla Monge
- Andrew Moore
- Zanele Muholi
- Eliot Porter
- Alex Prager
- Sebastião Salgado
- August Sander
- Masato Seto
- Julius Shulman
- Sigga Björg Sigurðardóttir
- Mark Steinmetz
- Susan Unterberg
- Bertien van Manen
- Hellen Van Meene
- Todd Webb
- Rachel Perry Welty
- Masao Yamamoto

=== Additional works ===
- Berenice Abbott
- Ansel Adams
- Lewis Baltz
- Bernd and Hilla Becher
- Harry Callahan
- Henri Cartier-Bresson
- William Eggleston
- Elliott Erwitt
- Adam Fuss
- Graciela Iturbide
- Barbara Kasten
- André Kertész
- O. Winston Link
- Robert Mapplethorpe
- Mary Ellen Mark
- Vik Muniz
- Ed Ruscha
- Stephen Shore
- Alfred Stieglitz
- Edward Weston
- Minor White
- Garry Winogrand

=== Staff ===
Current staff includes Cortney Norman, Associate Director, Archie Caride, Artist Liaison & Sales Associate, and Talia Heyman, Archivist.

== Publications ==
- Olivo Barbieri: Site Specific Roma (2006)
- Olivo Barbieri: Dolomites Project (2010)
- Olivo Barbieri: Site Specific New York (2007)
- Olivo Barbieri: The Waterfall Project
- Chan Chao: Burma: Something Went Wrong
- Sharon Core: Early American (2012)
- Mitch Epstein: Family Business
- Mitch Epstein: American Power
- Mitch Epstein: Berlin
- Mitch Epstein: Sunshine Hotel
- Mitch Epstein: In India
- Terry Evans: Terry Evans: From Prairie to Field
- Lynn Geesaman: Poetics of Place
- Lynn Geesaman: Hazy Lights and Shadows
- Lynn Geesaman: Gardenscapes
- Jitka Hanzlova: Mapfre Foundation Retrospective (2012)
- David Hilliard: Photographs
- Kahn & Selesnick: The Apollo Prophecies
- Lisa Kereszi: Fun and Games (2009)
- Lisa Kereszi: Fantasies (2008)
- Andrew Moore and Lisa Kereszi: Governors Island
- Lisa Kereszi: Joe's Junk Yard
- Hiroh Kikai: Asakusa Portraits
- Hiroh Kikai: Tokyo Labyrinth
- Alex MacLean: Over: The American Landscape at the Tipping Point
- Alex MacLean: Up on the Roof: New York's Hidden Skyline
- Bertien Van Manen: Let's Sit Down Before We Go (2011)
- Esko Mannikko: The Female Pike (2nd edition)
- Esko Mannikko: Mexas
- Andrew Moore: Cuba (2012)
- Andrew Moore: Detroit Disassembled (2010)
- Mario Cravo Neto: Laroye
- Alex Prager: The Big Valley / Week-end
- Sebastiao Salgado: Migrations
- Sebastiao Salgado: Genesis (2013)
- Sebastiao Salgado: From my Land to the Planet (2014)
- Sebastiao Salgado: The Scent of a Dream (2015)
- Sebastiao Salgado: Exodus (2016)
- Sebastiao Salgado: Amazônia (2021)
- Kahn and Selesnick: Apollo Prophecies (2006)
- Mike Smith: You're Not from Around Here
- Mark Steinmetz: South Central
- Susan Unterberg: Doubletakes
