= Rachel Perry (artist) =

- Born: 1962 (age 63–64); Japan
- Education: Connecticut College
- Parents: John Curtis Perry (father); Sarah Hollis Perry (mother)
- Website: www.rachelperrystudio.com

Rachel Perry (born 1962, formerly Rachel Perry Welty) is an American artist. She is known for conceptual works using drawing, photography, video, collage, sculpture and performance, which address “the fleeting nature of experience, the elusiveness of desire, and the persistence of objects in a throwaway culture.” Art critic Jerry Saltz has written that her work "not only grappl[es] with consumerism but [she is] just about swallowed whole by it.” Her work also considers themes of gender identity, narcissism, privacy and information overload.

She has exhibited widely throughout the United States and internationally, including a solo exhibition at Yancey Richardson Gallery in 2015, about which art critic Roberta Smith wrote, “…obsessive delights await in this strange and beautiful show…”

She lives and works in Gloucester, Massachusetts and Brooklyn, New York.

== Education ==
Rachel Lyman Perry was born in 1962 in Tokyo, Japan to Sarah Hollis Perry and John Curtis Perry She received her BA from Connecticut College in 1984 and a Diploma (2000) and Fifth Year Certificate (2001) from the School of the Museum of Fine Arts at Tufts.

== Career ==
Perry’s work can be found in the museum collections of The Museum of Fine Arts, Boston, Baltimore Museum of Art, Institute of Contemporary Art, Boston, the Montclair Art Museum, The Cornell Fine Arts Museum, and the Addison Gallery of American Art, among others. Her first solo museum show, titled was held at the DeCordova Museum and Sculpture Park in 2011.

Since 2009, Perry has been performing on Twitter, tweeting once per day, every day, the daily life of a working artist in 140 characters exactly.

=== Rachel Perry Welty 24/7 ===
In her DeCordova exhibit, titled Rachel Perry Welty 24/7 (on view January 29, 2011 - April 24, 2011) the works included focused on aspects of daily life, or what she calls "the business of living," using materials ranging from spam emails and grocery receipts to twist ties and stickers from fruit. The press release for the exhibit described elaborated, "mixing a Minimalist aesthetic with Pop humor, Welty's artworks uncover the poetic elements in the everyday." Later in 2011 the exhibit traveled to the Zimmerli Art Museum at Rutgers University.

=== Notable works ===
One of Perry's best known works is the video Karaoke Wrong Number (2004) in which the artist lip-syncs to five years of wrong number messages. This work entered the collection of the Institute of Contemporary Art, Boston in 2007.

Other notable works included in her solo exhibit in 2011 at DeCordova include Sticker Paper, a wallpaper collage of fruit stickers, and New and Improved, made up of dry cleaning and grocery store twist ties. In addition to these installation works, she presented a series of photographs titled Lost in my Life, self-portraits in which the artist is nearly camouflaged in sets composed of everyday materials, often featuring other artworks in these images.

In 2016, as an Artist-in-Residence at the Isabella Stewart Gardner Museum, Perry created a temporary installation for the museum's facade that asked the question "What do you really want?" The installation was on view from January until June 2016. The question around which the work was centered was the subject line of a spam email Perry received, and she was inspired to make certain formal artistic decisions from materials she encountered in the museum archive during her residency.

=== Style ===
Many of Perry's works are deeply personal, since the everyday materials or detritus composed in the pieces were collected by the artist herself, often amassed over periods of several years. In Karaoke Wrong Number, for example, the wrong number voicemails she lip-synced to were left on her phone. and for New and Improved, Perry used twist ties she had been collecting since 1997.

== Awards and recognition ==
Perry has received numerous awards for her work. She is a two-time winner of the Massachusetts Cultural Council Award (2004 in Drawing; 2009 in Sculpture), and has twice been awarded the Traveling Fellowship from the Museum of Fine Arts, Boston for proven excellence. Perry has been named both Catherine Boettcher Fellow and Anne Stark and Kurt Locher Fellow at The MacDowell Colony, and has been Artist-in-Residence in an ongoing program at the Isabella Stewart Gardner Museum since October 2014.

== Representation ==
Rachel Perry is represented by Yancey Richardson Gallery, New York.
