= Still life photography =

Genre of photography used for the depiction of an inanimate subject matter

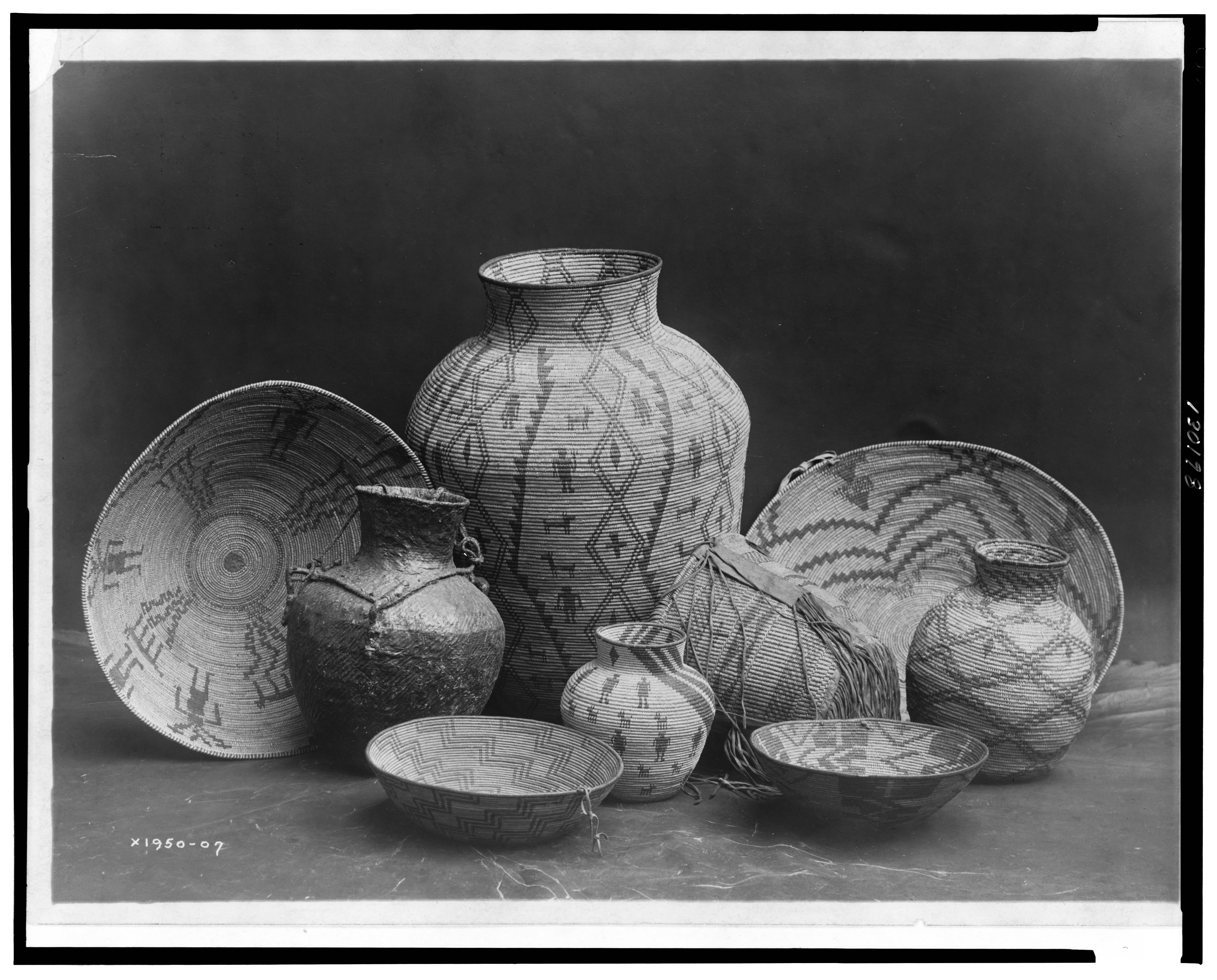
Apache still life. c.1907 by Edward S. Curtis.

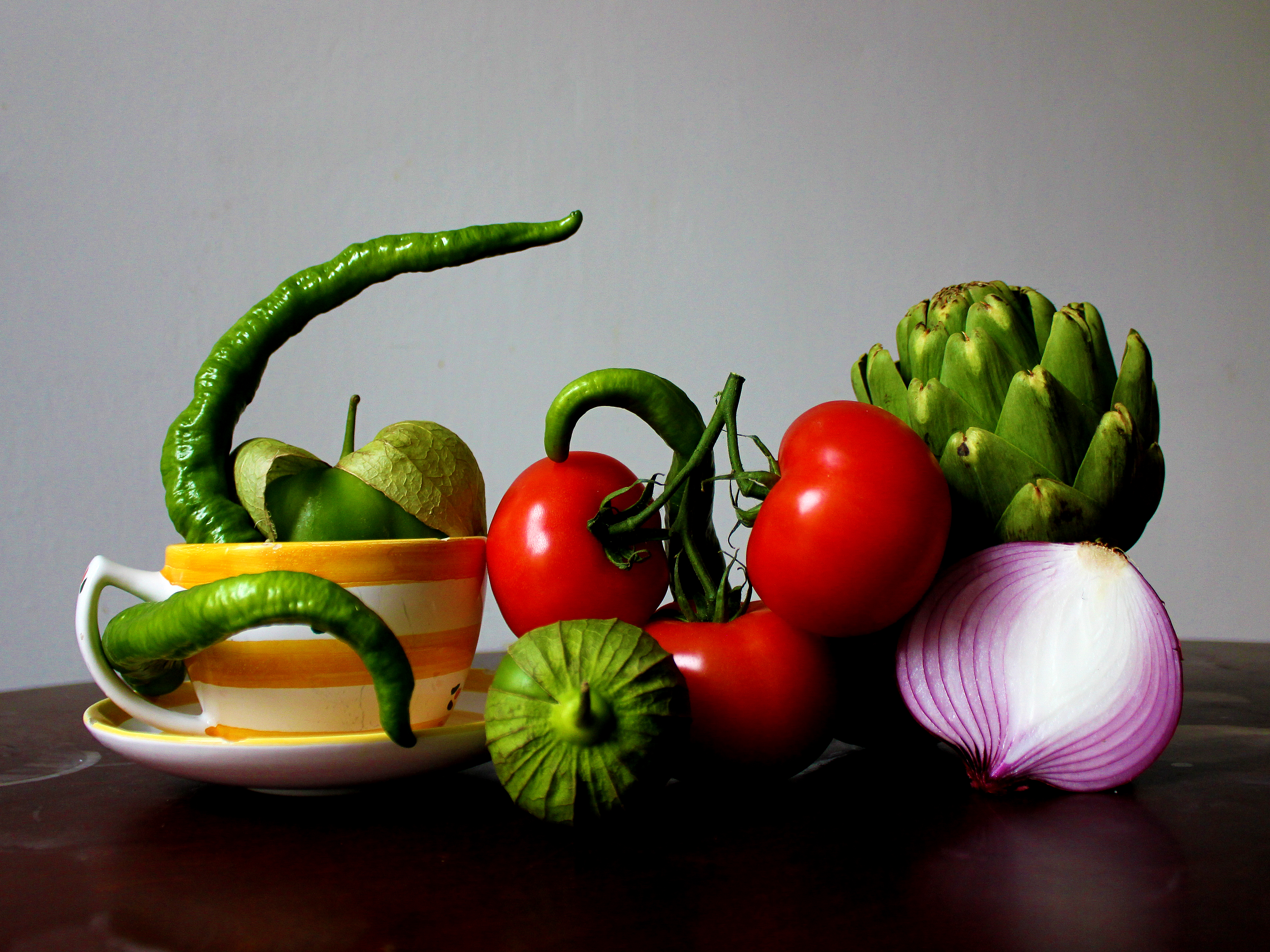
A modern-day still life photo with red tomatoes

Still life photography is a genre of photography used for the depiction of inanimate subject matter, typically a small group of objects. Similar to still life painting, it is the application of photography to the still life artistic style. Tabletop photography, product photography, food photography, found object photography, etc. are examples of still life photography.

This genre gives the photographer more leeway in the arrangement of design elements within a composition compared to other photographic genres, such as landscape or portrait photography. Lighting and framing are important aspects of still life photography composition.

Manmade objects like pots, vases, consumer products, handicrafts etc. or natural objects like plants, fruits, vegetables, food, rocks, shells etc. can be taken as subjects for still life photography. Typically, still life photos are not close up to the subject nor far away, but at a very head-on angle.

The J. Paul Getty Museum mounted the exhibition In Focus: Still Life at the Getty Center in Los Angeles from September 2010 to January 2011. The exhibition included works by still life photographers such as Paul Outerbridge, Paul Strand, André Kertész, Albert Renger-Patzsch, Josef Sudek, Jan Groover, Sharon Core, and Martin Parr.
