= David True =

American painter

Zen of Alarm, by David True, 1988, acrylic and ink on paper mounted on canvas, Honolulu Museum of Art (promised gift)

David True (born 1942) is an American painter, born in Marietta, Ohio. He received a BFA from Ohio University in 1966 and an MFA from Ohio University in 1967. In 1978, he was included in the New Image Painting exhibition at the Whitney Museum of American Art. He currently lives and paints in New York, and teaches at Cooper Union.

For most of his career, David True painted the human image, but in the 1980s, turned to nature for some of his subjects. Zen of Alarm, from 1988, is a promised gift to the Honolulu Museum of Art. This acrylic and ink painting conveys the surrealist nature of much of the artist's work. Throughout the 1980s, David True created a series of woodblock and other fine art prints published by Crown Point Press.

The Denver Art Museum, Henie-Onstad Art Centre (Hoevikodden, Norway), Herbert F. Johnson Museum of Art (Cornell University), Honolulu Museum of Art, Metropolitan Museum of Art, Minneapolis Institute of Art, Munson-Williams-Proctor Arts Institute (Utica, N.Y.), Museum of Modern Art, Rhode Island School of Design Museum, Virginia Museum of Fine Arts, Walker Art Center (Minneapolis), Whitney Museum of American Art, Yale University Art Gallery are among the public collections holding works by David True.
