= Sharon Core =

American artist and photographer (born 1965)

- Born: 1965 (age 60–61); New Orleans, Louisiana, U.S.
- Education: University of Georgia (BFA); Yale University (MFA)
- Known for: Photography

Sharon Core (born 1965) is an American artist and photographer. Core first gained recognition with her Thiebauds series (2003-4) in which she created photographic interpretations of American painter Wayne Thiebaud's renderings of food. Two of her works in the Thiebauds series, Candy Counter 1969 (2004) and Confections (2005) were acquired by the Solomon R. Guggenheim Museum in 2005.

== Early life and education ==
Core was born in New Orleans in 1965. She received a Bachelor of Fine Arts in 1987 from the University of Georgia and a Master of Fine Arts from the Yale University School of Art in 1998, which is where she received the George Sakier Memorial Prize for Excellence in Photography.

== Career ==
After studying painting at the University of Georgia, Core moved to Stockholm, Sweden. She then settled in Prague in 1993, where she first practiced photography seriously and created a baking business based in her own apartment. In 1996, she returned to the United States to attend the Yale University School of Art. For her thesis project, which was centered around the ritual of eating, she photographed people consuming their favorite foods.

This project led to her early series, Drunk (1998–2000), in which she captured portraits of intoxicated guests at a party she organized as well as those she found at local gatherings.

Her next series, Early American (2007–2010), remodeled the still lifes of 18th century American painter Raphaelle Peale. Similar to the photographs of Thiebauds, Core again focused on the idea of process, growing the early 19th century produce in Peale's paintings in her greenhouse and collecting period dish ware. She also painted the walls in the backdrop of the photographs to echo Peale's painting techniques. These works were on view at the Yancey Richardson Gallery in New York City from October 23 to December 6, 2008.

Core's project 1606-1907 (2011–2015) explored three centuries of flower paintings.

For her subsequent project "Understory" (2015), Core takes inspiration from the seventeenth-century Sottobosco tradition of Dutch paintings of forest floors. According to a description in The New Yorker, "Core's new pictures revel in decay and wildness. Snails slither across bright, wet leaves; pink flowers collapse in a pile of petals; a toad peers from the shadows, camouflaged in the dirt."

=== Copyright ===
In her series Thiebauds (2003–2005), Core recreated 18 of Wayne Thiebaud's food paintings of the 1960s. She was inspired upon viewing Thiebaud's retrospective at the Whitney Museum of American Art in 2001. In 2004, Robert Panzer, then executive director of the Visual Artists and Galleries Association (the copyright collective that represented Thiebaud at the time), told the New York Times "Wayne Thiebaud is concerned with the use that Sharon Core has made of his work...The reproductions she has made are largely straightforward versions of his paintings." Thiebaud responded to Panzer's remarks to the press by sending Core a letter praising her photographs and refuting Panzer's claims that Thiebaud was "concerned."

== Personal life ==
Core lives and works in Esopus, New York.

== Exhibitions ==
Core has presented solo exhibitions at spaces across the U.S.:

- White Room Exhibition, White Columns, New York (2000)
- Sharon Core: Photographs, Clementine Gallery, New York (2001)
- Thiebauds, Bellwether Gallery, New York (2004)
- Early American, Yancey Richardson Gallery, New York (2008),
- James Kelly Contemporary, Santa Fe, New Mexico (2009),
- Hermes Foundation, New York (2009),
- Savannah College of Art and Design, Savannah, Georgia (2009)
- Project Gallery, Yancey Richardson Gallery, New York (2010)
- 1606-1907, Yancey Richardson Gallery, New York (2011)
- Still Lives: Early Works by Sharon Core, Mint Museum, Charlotte, North Carolina (2013)
- Understory, Yancey Richardson Gallery, New York (2016)

=== Selected collections ===
Core's works have also been purchased by various institutions:

- Alturas Foundation, San Antonio, Texas
- Amon Carter Museum, Fort Worth, Texas
- Cleveland Museum of Art, Cleveland, Ohio
- Columbus Museum, Columbus, Georgia
- Cornell Museum, Cleveland, Ohio
- Hermes Foundation, Paris, France
- J. Paul Getty Museum, Los Angeles, California
- Lannan Foundation, Santa Fe, New Mexico
- Montclair Art Museum, Montclair, New Jersey
- National Gallery of Art, Washington, DC
- Norton Museum of Art, West Palm Beach, Florida
- The Phillips Collection, Washington, DC
- Princeton University Art Museum, Princeton, New Jersey
- Samuel Dorsky Museum of Art, State University of New York, New Paltz, New York
- Solomon R. Guggenheim Museum, New York, New York
- The Mint Museum, Charlotte, North Carolina
- The National Museum of Women in the Arts, Washington, D.C.
- The Norton Collection, New York, New York
- The West Collection, SEI, Oaks Park, Pennsylvania
- The Zabludowicz Collection, London England, Sarvisalo, Finland, New York, New York
- University of Virginia Art Museum, Charlottesville, VA
- Yale University Art Gallery, New Haven, CT
