= Joy Garnett =

American painter

Joy Amina Garnett (born 1960) is an artist and writer from New York, United States. Trained as a painter, her artwork explores contemporary practices around cultural preservation, alternative histories and archives. Her interdisciplinary work combines creative writing, research and visual media. In her early paintings (1997–2009), Garnett engaged issues around contemporary consumption of media and the distinctions between documentary, technical, and artistic image making. Her mature work draws on archival images, alternative histories and the legacy of her maternal grandfather, the Egyptian Romantic poet, bee scientist and polymath Ahmed Zaki Abu Shadi. Garnett is married to conceptual photographer and video artist Bill Jones.

Garnett was awarded a writing fellowship at Yaddo in Spring 2024 to work on her family memoir The Bee Kingdom, which was Longlisted for the First Pages Prize in Creative Nonfiction later that year. The book includes fictional chapters set in the past. It is scheduled to be published in January 2027 by Gaudy Boy. Garnett was a 2019 Artist in Residence at the Elizabeth Foundation for the Arts. In 2011, she received a joint commission from the Chipstone Foundation and the Milwaukee Art Museum to produce work for the traveling exhibition “The Tool At Hand” (2011–2013). In 2007, she was an artist in residence at iCommons, Dubrovnik, Croatia, and in 2005, she was an artist in residence at the Atlantic Center for the Arts.

In 2004, Garnett received an Anonymous Was A Woman Award. She has also received grants from the Lower Manhattan Cultural Council (LMCC).

In 2019, Garnett became the Art Director of the literary magazine Evergreen Review, founded in 1957 by Barney Rosset and re-launched in 2017 by John Oakes. From 2005 to 2016, she was the Arts Editor at Cultural Politics, a scholarly journal published by Duke University Press that features in each issue an essay written by a visual artist about their work. From 2013 to 2016, she penned "Copy That!", a column on fair use issues in visual art, for Art21 Magazine. She was the founder of NEWSgrist, an electronic newsletter and art blog (ca. 2000–2017). From 1999 til 2001, she wrote the column "Into Africa" for artnet magazine.

Controversy surrounding Garnett's 2003 painting "Molotov" drew international scrutiny to issues of authorship, appropriation and fair use in visual art. She lectured and wrote widely on these topics.

== Education and early career ==
Garnett completed her undergraduate work at McGill University in Montreal, Canada in 1983, where she studied film, literature and literary Arabic, as well as colloquial Arabic during a summer intensive at the American University in Cairo. From 1984 to 1987, she lived in Paris, where she studied painting at École Nationale Supérieure des Beaux-Arts. She returned to New York in 1987 and worked at Watanabe Studio, Ltd. in Brooklyn, NY, producing limited edition prints for Sol LeWitt, Sue Coe and others. In 1989, she entered the graduate program at The City College of New York where she received her MFA in 1991. While attending City College, Garnett received the Therese Ralston McCabe Connor Award.

In 1999, Debs & Co. Gallery, NY, gave Garnett her first solo exhibition, "Buster-Jangle", which consisted of paintings based on photos and film stills of atomic bomb tests from the 1950s released in 1990–91 by the US government under the Freedom of Information Act. The exhibition was noted for its exploration of a “paradoxical realm of terrible beauty… tying together the histories of the bomb and American landscape painting."

== The Bomb Project ==
Garnett's research for these paintings entailed gathering images and documents about nuclear testing from primary sources on the Internet. This generated an online compilation of material that she launched as a website, "The Bomb Project".

"The Bomb Project" addressed the role of the digital image as a cultural artifact. Garnett attempted to reveal the information and hegemonic coding within these images to “establish a context where art, science and government are presented as interlocking and overlapping areas.” After its launch in 2000, "The Bomb Project" was expanded to include still and moving declassified imagery, primary source documents, links to current events and news articles. The original documentation produced by the nuclear industry was offered side by side with artist and activist views, providing a platform for comparative study and a resource for artists.

== Use of found images ==
Garnett explored the problem of the found object, re-mediating and transforming the image of a documentary/technical photograph by painting it (ca.1997-2018), shifting its context and opening it up for multiple interpretations by the viewer, consistent with the conventions of visual art.

Garnett's paintings were sometimes framed as responding to, engaging and extending contemporary media theory.

== "Molotov" and surrounding controversy ==
Molotov
- Artist: Joy Garnett
- Year: 2003
- Medium: Oil on canvas
- Dimensions: 178 cm × 152 cm (70 in × 60 in)
- Location: Private Collection (USA)

Garnett's 2004 exhibition "Riot" featured a series of paintings based on images pulled from mass media sources, depicting figures in "extreme emotional states." The painting entitled "Molotov" was sourced from a jpeg found on the Internet that was later discovered to be a fragment of a larger photograph taken by Susan Meiselas during the Sandinista Revolution (1979). After "Riot" closed, Meiselas's lawyer contacted Garnett with a cease and desist letter claiming copyright infringement and "piracy" of Meiselas' photograph. Popular support for Garnett and her artwork, marshalled through a list-serv at Rhizome.org, inspired a solidarity campaign called "Joywar", in which images of Garnett's painting were reposted widely on the Internet, or remixed and circulated in new forms.

The incident has become a prominent case-study of re-use in art.

== Awards ==
- Yaddo Fellowship for creative writing (2024)
- First Pages Prize Longlist for Creative Nonfiction (2024)
- Elizabeth Foundation for the Arts, residency (2019)
- Chipstone Foundation Milwaukee, project funding (2011)
- iCommons Dubrovnik, Croatia, residency (2007)
- Atlantic Center for the Arts, residency (2005)
- Anonymous Was A Woman Award (2004)
- Manhattan Community Arts Fund, Lower Manhattan Cultural Council, project funding (2002; 2003)
- The Wellcome Trust, London, UK, project funding (2000)
- Therese Ralston McCabe Connor Award (1990; 1991)
