= Barbara Norfleet =

American photographer, author, curator, professor and social scientist (born 1926)

Barbara Pugh Norfleet (born February 18, 1926) is an American documentary photographer, author, curator, professor and social scientist who used photography as social documentary and allegory to examine American culture. Her photographic work is represented in museum collections around the world. She is founder and curator of a photographic archive on American social history at the Fogg Art Museum at Harvard University.

== Early life and education ==
Born in Lakewood, New Jersey, in 1926, Norfleet graduated from Swarthmore College in 1947 with an economics major and in 1957 received a PhD from Harvard University in social psychology. She married Alfred Cohn in 1951.

== Careers ==
In 1952 Norfleet taught a course at Harvard in statistics and then left Harvard to raise her three sons. She returned to Harvard in 1960 to co-teach a course with David Riesman entitled "American Character and Social Structure". In 1970 she audited the introductory photography studio course taught by Len Gittleman which precipitated her career shift to photography and curation. In 1971 she moved to the Visual and Environmental Study Department at Harvard and taught a popular studio course "Photography As Sociological Description" and later a lecture course "America Seen". She became curator of the Carpenter Center for the Visual Arts and with a grant from NEH to collect and organize a photographic archive exploring the social history of the U.S.

Writer Bill Kowenhoven said of Norfleet after he interviewed her in 1998. "As a teacher of social psychology and sociology at Harvard, she has brought her own squirrel soul to photography and to Harvard’s Archive of American Social History which she began. She leaps from branch to branch of seemingly divergent aspects of photography and criticism yet maintains balance, grace, and connectedness that leads always to a cohesive body of work."

The subtitle of her curatorial book on photography, Champion Pig (1980), is "great moments in everyday life" which sums up Notfleet's shift in perspective from a modernist standpoint which valued form and composition above all else to one where she encouraged the viewer to consider not just what a photo looked like, but also the context in which it was made and what it told us about society. As a curator she found value in vernacular images and small town photo studio archives, which until this time had been ignored by the curatoratorial community.

John Szarkowski, director of photography at the Museum of Modern Art at the time of this publication said, when interviewed for an article on Norfleet, "It's the kind of stuff you don't very often find even in those art museums... Well, now it's the stuff that everyone else would want. It turns out it wasn't ordinary; it turns out it was very special—it had to do with what was typical, what was really central to American culture at that time."

In 1984 she received a Guggenheim Fellowship for her photographic project documenting rich people published in 1986 called All the Right People. Her photographic and curatorial work were influential on a generation of photographers. She retired from Harvard University in 2001 having published seven books on her curatorial work as well as six books and portfolios on her own photographic work including Manscape with Beasts (1990), The Illusion of Orderly Progress (1999), and Aesthetics of Defense (2006).

== Awards ==
- 1975: National Endowment for the Humanities Research Grant to collect and organize the photography collection at Harvard University on America's social history;
- 1982: Massachusetts Artist's Fellowship in Photography;
- 1984: Guggenheim Fellowship from the John Simon Guggenheim Memorial Foundation
- 1984, 1982: National Endowment for the Arts Fellowship in Photography;
- 1987: PIA Award (Printing Industries of America) Graphics Art Award;
- 1987: Massachusetts Artist's Fellowship in Photography;
- 1991: Aaron Siskind Award;
- 1997: Honorary Bachelor of Fine Arts: New Hampshire Institute of Art;
- 1997: Honoree for contributions as artist, teacher, and curator, The Fifth National Women in Photography Conference;
- 2014: Doctor of Arts Honorary Degree: Swarthmore College;
- 2015: Focus Award for lifetime achievement: Griffin Museum of Photography;

== Publications ==
- 1979: The Champion Pig, David Godine, (pb.edition 1980 Viking-Peguin)
- 1979: Wedding, Simon & Schuster (C) (Pb edition Amory and Pugh)
- 1982: Killing Time, David Godine
- 1986: All the Right People, New York Graphic/Little Brown
- 1990: Manscape With Beasts, Harry Abrams, Inc.
- 1993: Looking at Death, David Godine, Inc. (pb 1993)
- 1999: Illusion of Orderly Progress, Foreword by E.O. Wilson, Alfred Knopf
- 2001: When We Liked Ike: Looking for Postwar America, Norton
- 2006: Landscape of the Cold War: portfolio, Palm Press
- 2012: Faith Hope, and Charity: Social Reform and Photography, 1885-1910. Boston, MA: David R. Godine, 2012. ISBN 978-1567924480. With Suzanne Greenberg.

== Collections ==
Norfleet's work is held in the following permanent collections:

- Museum of Contemporary Photography, Chicago
- Museum of Modern Art, New York: 5 prints (as of 1 December 2022)

== General references ==
- The Photographer in the Garden, Aperture, 2018. ISBN 978-1-59711-373-1
- Camera Atomica, O'Brian John, Black Dog, 2015. ISBN 978-1-908966-48-3
