= Taxonomy of Megacerops =

Taxonomy of a fossil mammal genus

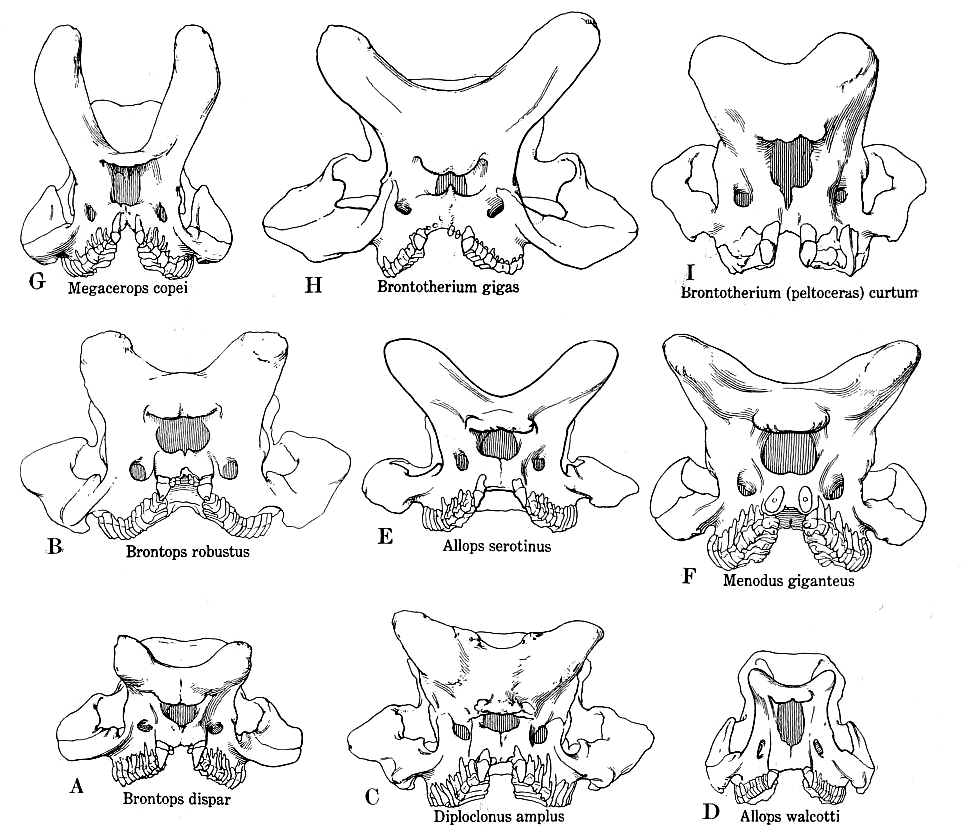
Nine skulls illustrated by Henry Fairfield Osborn (1929), showing the variation seen in the fossil material. The skulls are labeled as belonging to different species, per Osborn's taxonomy.

The brontothere genus Megacerops, known from the Chadronian (a North American Land Mammal Age), has a complex and extensive taxonomic history. Known from hundreds of well-preserved specimens, the fossils are highly similar in most of their anatomy but differ considerably in the size, shape, and orientation of the horns, in features of the nasal bones, and in the thickness of the zygomatic arches. These features have historically been used to name over fifty species, classified in over twenty genera. (Note: These genera include sixteen generic names now considered to apply to the same animal as Megacerops: Allops, Ateleodon, Brontotherium, Brontops, Diconodon, Diploclonus, Eotherium, Haplacodon, Megaceratops, Menodus, Menops, Miobasileus, Symborodon, Teleodus, Titanops, and Titanotherium. The name Anisacodon was used for Diconodon before it was found to be preoccupied. There is also the name Leydiotherium, used provisionally in 1860 but never properly defined. Chadronian brontothere fossils have also been erroneously referred to the (valid but non-brontothere) genera Chalicotherium, Palaeotherium, and Rhinoceros. For species, refer to the table of taxonomic names.) The abundance of fossil specimens, and poor stratigraphic data for most of them has further complicated the taxonomy.

The first Chadronian brontothere fossil to be scientifically described was a jaw fragment described in 1847 by Hiram A. Prout, who believed it came from a "giant Palaeotherium". Over the course of the late 19th and early 20th century, a large number of taxa were named based on Chadronian brontothere fossils, especially during the Bone Wars by rival researchers Edward Drinker Cope and Othniel Charles Marsh. Several taxa were later named by Henry Fairfield Osborn, who in 1929 published an extensive monograph on brontotheres. Osborn's monograph recognized 37 (Note: Osborn's taxonomy as presented in this article contains 38 species because Osborn included the species "Menodus rumelicus" from Bulgaria in the genus Brontotherium. The count of 37 species excludes "M. rumelicus" since it is not from Chadronian North America.) species as valid, grouped into seven genera. Osborn's taxonomy was dismissed as unrealistic by both contemporaries and later researchers, since so many species could not have coexisted in the relatively brief Chadronian. For much of the 20th century, Chadronian brontothere taxonomy was regarded as an "insoluable problem". No formal species-level taxonomic revision has been conducted since Osborn's monograph but overviews by later researchers have proposed wildly different taxonomies, recognizing as many as six genera or as few as one genus. (Note: In his 1929 monograph, Osborn recognized seven Chadronian brontothere genera as valid (Allops, Brontops, Brontotherium, Diploclonus, Megacerops, Menodus, and Teleodus). Simpson (1945) recognized five genera (Brontops, Brontotherium, Megacerops, Menodus, and Teleodus). Clark, Beerbower & Kietzke (1967) recognized two genera (Menodus and Teleodus). Mader (1989, 1998) recognized three genera (Brontops, Megacerops, Menops). McKenna & Bell recognized five genera (Ateleodon, Brontops, Brontotherium, Megacerops, and Menodus). Mihlbachler (2008) recognized the single genus Megacerops.)

In a 2004 preliminary revision, Matthew C. Mihlbachler, Spencer G. Lucas, and Robert J. Emry concluded that the variation in the fossil material was slightly higher than could be expected for a single sexually dimorphic mammal species, but that it was not possible to separate the fossils into discrete units (i.e. species) based on any particular feature. They recognized only two Chadronian brontothere species, Megacerops coloradensis and M. kuwagatarhinus, differentiated by whether the horns are bifurcating (M. kuwagatarhinus) or not (M. coloradensis). Although this model has become generally accepted since 2004, the taxonomy remains unresolved due to the continued lack of a detailed species-level revision.

== Early descriptions ==
=== Descriptions of Menodus and Titanotherium ===
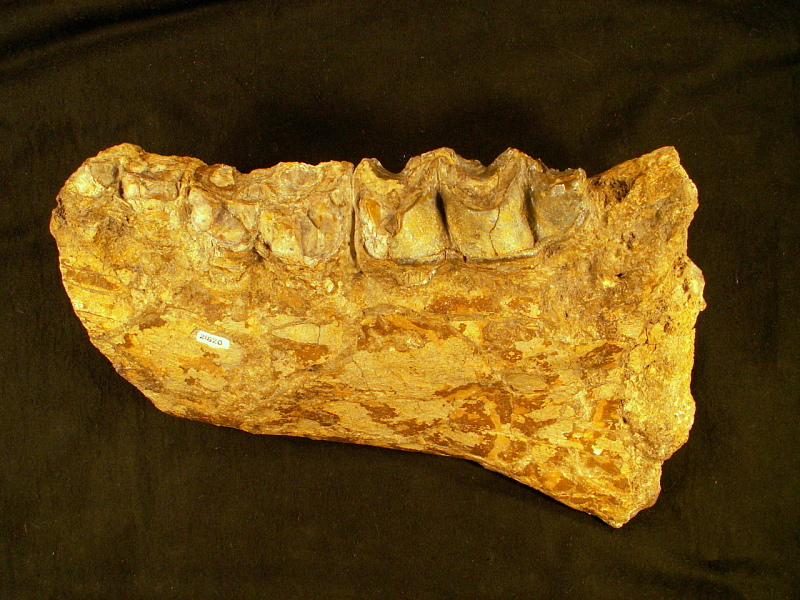
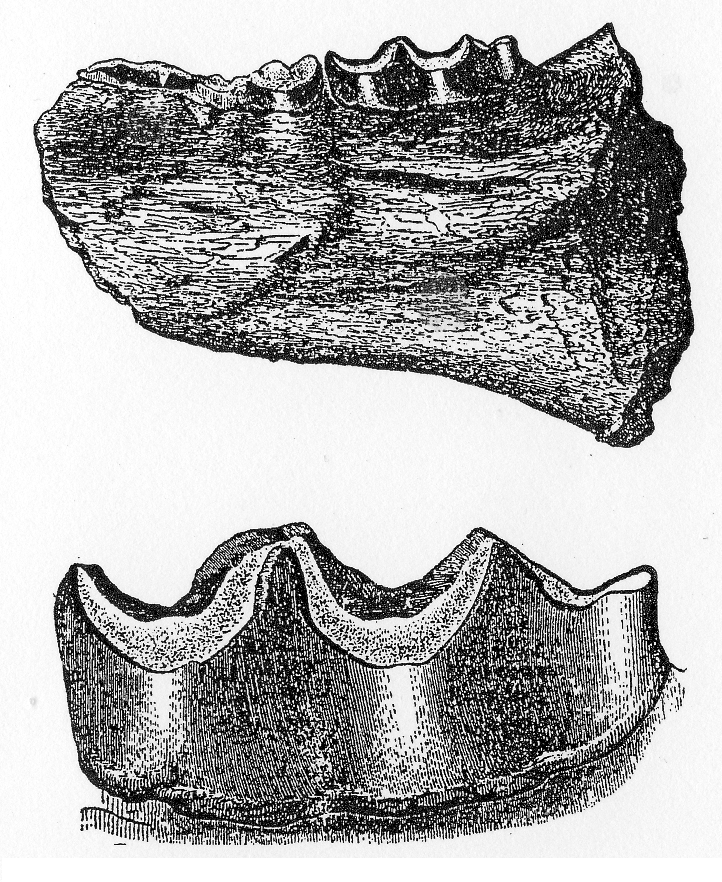
Photograph of USNM 21820, and Hiram A. Prout's original 1847 illustration of the fossil. USNM 21820, a fragmentary right jaw, is the first scientifically published fossil now recognizable as a brontothere and is the type specimen of Menodus giganteus.

The first brontothere fossil described was a fragment of a right jaw (USNM 21820), found in the White River badlands of South Dakota. This fossil was collected in 1843 by the fur trader Alexander Culbertson, of the American Fur Company. The fossil was transported to St. Louis, where it came into the hands of the physician Hiram A. Prout. Prout reported the fossil in 1846 as the "remains of a Palaeotherium", found in "the Tertiary near St. Louis". Palaeotherium, a fossil equoid, was otherwise known only from Europe. James Dwight Dana and Benjamin Silliman, of the American Journal of Science, noted that the complete jaw must have measured at least 30 inches (76 cm) long, far larger than any Palaeotherium known. In 1847, Prout illustrated and described the fossil, referring to it as the jaw of a "gigantic Palaeotherium". As one of the first mammal fossils from the American West brought to scientific attention, the publication of Prout's jaw captured the attention of the nascent paleontological community in the United States and set into motion the first wave of a "fossil rush" in the western parts of the country.

Auguste Pomel concluded that Prout's jaw represented a new taxon. In 1849, Pomel named Menodus giganteus, with USNM 21820 as the type specimen. Pomel considered Menodus to be a subgenus of Palaeotherium. In 1873, Othniel Charles Marsh argued that Menodus was an invalid name, too similar to the reptile genus Menodon (=Nothosaurus) and thus preoccupied, but this is incorrect since the two names are spelled differently.

In 1850, David Dale Owen, Joseph Granville Norwood, and John Evans recorded new brontothere fossils in a preliminary report on fossils collected by Evans. Owen, Norwood, and Evans described the new species Palaeotherium? proutii, named after Prout. The fossils were provisionally referred to Palaeotherium due to the difficulty in establishing genus-level characteristics for the fossils. The name was intended to cover the same taxon as Prout's original jaw (e.g. Pomel's Menodus giganteus): "These remarkable remains are thus named in compliment to Dr. Prout of St. Louis who first noticed them in the American Journal of Science and Arts". No type specimen was formally designated for P.? proutii, and it is not clear in the original description if the taxon was intended to be based on Prout's original jaw, or on new material collected by Evans.

The fossils collected by Evans were turned over to Joseph Leidy, who studied and described them in greater detail. In 1852, Leidy wrote that he suspected that they "belong to a different genus from either Palaeotherium or Anchitherium, and should the suspicion prove correct, Titanotherium would be a good name for this animal, as expressive of its very great size". Leidy based the genus Titanotherium on several fossils, including Prout's original jaw, "Owen's specimen" (USNM 113, a partial left jaw found by Evans), and several fragmentary fossils. Leidy concluded, like Owen and colleagues, that USNM 21820 and USNM 113 were congeneric, and used the name Titanotherium proutii for the fossils.

=== Confusions of type specimens ===
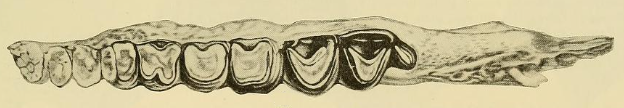
USNM 113, a partial left jaw and the type specimen of Palaeotherium? proutii (Titanotherium proutii)

There has been considerable confusion in later literature over the type specimens of Menodus and Titanotherium. Owen, Norwood, and Evans, and later Leidy, considered USNM 21820 and USNM 113 to belong to the same taxon (Titanotherium proutii). The earlier described USNM 21820 was already designated as the type specimen of Menodus giganteus by Pomel in 1849. By the process of elimination, the type specimen of Titanotherium proutii is thus the next fossil included when the taxon was named, i.e. "Owen's specimen", the left jaw USNM 113.

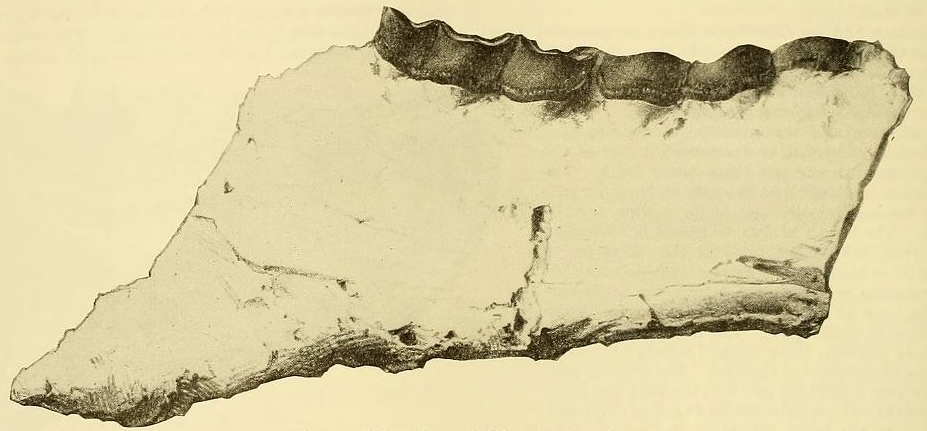
ANSP 12669, a partial right jaw historically confused with USNM 21820. This jaw likely comes from the same individual as USNM 113.

In 1853, Leidy mentioned that Prout had loaned him the original jaw fragment, with "another corresponding to the opposite side, apparently of the same individual". It is clear from Leidy's text and figures that he confused specimens. In a corresponding figure, Leidy illustrated what is most likely the opposite jaw of the same individual as USNM 113, not USNM 21820 (based on the size of the specimens). The jaw figured by Leidy is a specimen now designated as ANSP 12669, and modern examination has revealed that it is likely the right jaw of the same animal as USNM 113.

In a major 1929 monograph on brontotheres, Henry Fairfield Osborn reproduced Leidy's figure of the right jaw (e.g. ANSP 12669) as "Figure 159, Type of Menodus giganteus. Prout's original specimen", repeating Leidy's mistake. Osborn made this mistake despite also featuring Prout's original illustration of USNM 21820 on the preceding page (as Fig. 158). Leidy's left jaw, e.g. USNM 113, was reproduced by Osborn as "Figure 160, Owen's specimen of Palaeotherium? proutii".

In 1929, Osborn incorrectly stated that USNM 21820 had been destroyed and was known only from Leidy's figures and measurements, attributing its destruction to the St. Louis Fire of 1849. Osborn's assertion was accepted as correct for decades, until the fossil was found to be in the collections of the National Museum of Natural History, having been donated there in 1957 by Courtney Werner, Associate Professor of Geology at the Washington University in St. Louis.

=== Tooth taxa ===
Leidy named several new species based on incomplete teeth. Palaeotherium maximum was named in 1852, based on parts of the ectolophs (a ridge on the upper molars of certain perissodactyls) of two molars from Owen's collection. Leidy believed the fossils to represent a "true species of Palaeotherium". Later in the same year, Leidy named the species Rhinoceros americanus based on two large premolar teeth he believed to belong to "a new species of Rhinoceros, or probably Aceratherium". These were the first proposed fossils of Rhinoceros in the Americas, and Leidy noted that the size of the teeth suggested a species larger than any modern Rhinoceros. The R. americanus fossils were not part of Owen's collection. In 1853, Leidy created the new genus Eotherium (Note: In 1875, Eotherium was also used as the name for a new genus of extinct sirenians by Richard Owen. Since the name is preoccupied by Leidy's Eotherium, the sirenian was later renamed Eotheroides.) for the teeth previously referred to R. americanus, and renamed the species to Eotherium americanum. Leidy considered the genus Eotherium to combine characteristics of Rhinoceros and Palaeotherium. In 1854, Leidy named the new species Palaeotherium giganteum, based on parts of the ectolophs of five molars, from Owen and Culbertson's collections.

In later writings, Leidy treated both Eotherium americanum and Palaeotherium giganteum as synonyms of Titanotherium proutii. In 1929, Osborn considered all of Leidy's tooth taxa to be indeterminate (not diagnostic enough to assign to any taxon) brontothere fossils, and noted that the type specimens of P. maximum and E. americanum could no longer be located.

Leidy's 1852–1854 tooth taxa, type specimens

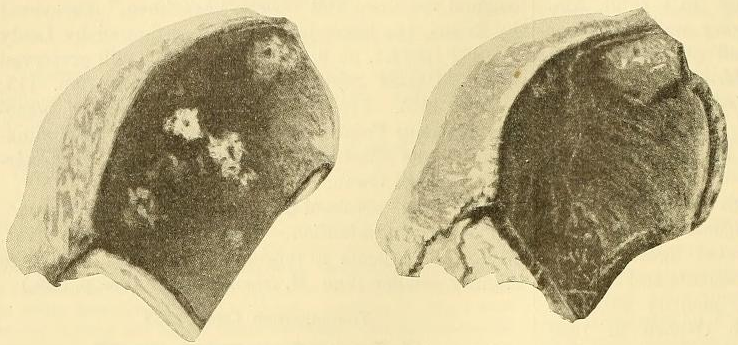
Palaeotherium maximum

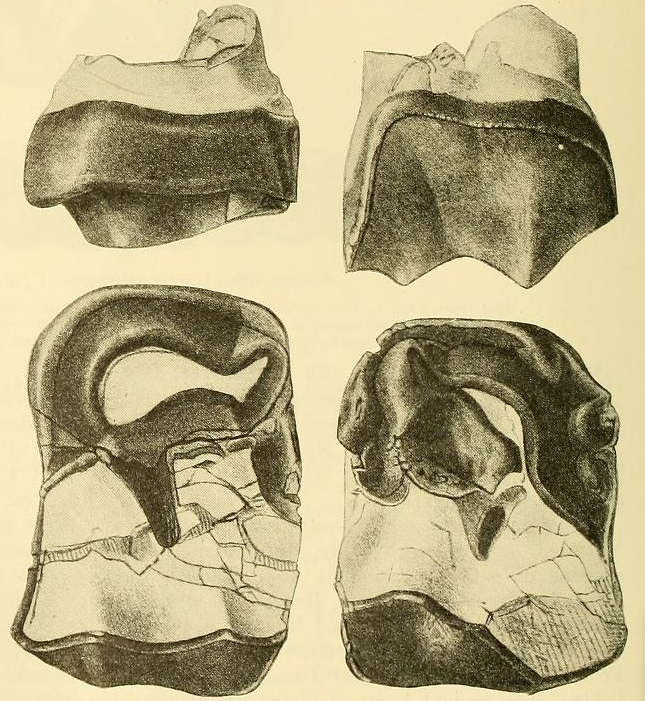
Rhinoceros americanus (Eotherium americanum)

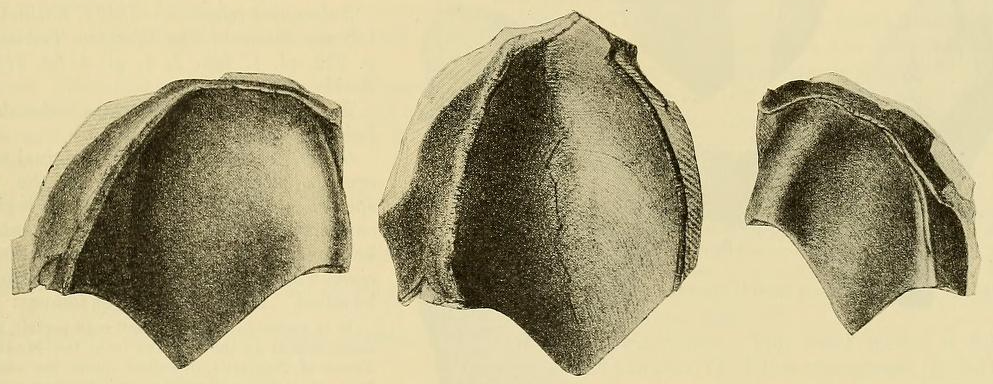
Palaeotherium giganteum

In 1860, Prout provisionally named a new genus, Leidyotherium, without designating any species. Leidyotherium was based on a "fragment of a large molar tooth" found near Abingdon, Virginia. Prout distinguished the tooth from those of Titanotherium based on "the great width and depth of the groove between the outer and what may have been the inner border of the tooth". Prout did not formally describe the genus or specimen, in the hope that further fossils would be discovered to more definitely establish the characteristics of the animal. Leidy later treated Leidyotherium as a synonym of Titanotherium, and Osborn (1929) considered the tooth to be an indeterminate brontothere fossil. The Leidyotherium tooth has since been lost.

=== Description of Megacerops coloradensis ===
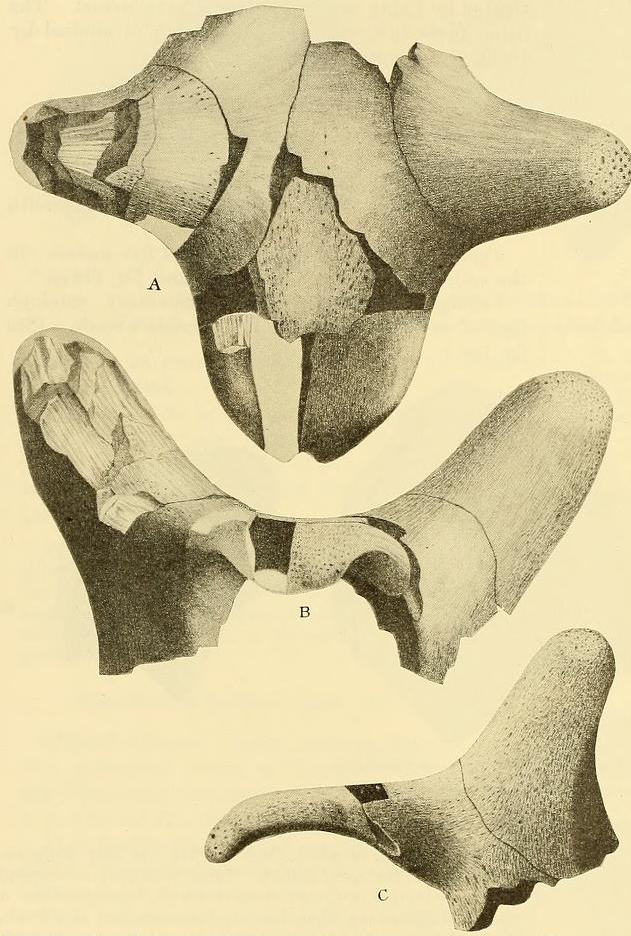
ANSP 13362, the type specimen of Megacerops coloradensis, parts of the horns and nasal bones

In 1870, Leidy described the new genus and species Megacerops coloradensis. The new taxon was based on the type specimen ANSP 13362, consisting of a pair of horns and some of the nasal bones. ANSP 13362 was found in the so-called Titanotherium zone of the Chadron Formation in Colorado. ANSP 13362 is the earliest described Chadronian brontothere fossil to preserve the distinctive horns.

Leidy compared the horns of ANSP 13362 to those of the extinct giraffid Sivatherium, and struggled with identifying the animal. In his initial description, Leidy stated that "it is probable that the fossil may pertain to the same animal as the remains from the Mauvaises Terres (Note: Badlands, see Badlands § Etymology) of Nebraska, described under the name of Titanotherium" but since there was a "state of extreme uncertainty as to its collocation", the fossil was equally likely to belong to some other animal, such as the camelid Megalomeryx or an American species of Sivatherium, and that it could thus provisionally be referred to a new genus and species.

== Bone Wars ==
From 1873 to 1891, research on Chadronian brontotheres was dominated by contributions by the rival researchers Edward Drinker Cope and Othniel Charles Marsh. During the so-called Bone Wars, Cope and Marsh viciously competed to assemble great collections of fossils, and to name more species than the other. Collections across the United States were rapidly filled with fossils of dinosaurs and other prehistoric life.

Both Marsh and Cope's work on brontotheres was exclusively descriptive and systematic. Marsh named fourteen new species, in eight new genera, and Cope named twelve species, in three new genera. New taxa were named for nearly every brontothere fossil that came into the hands of either Marsh or Cope and little to no work was done on the interrelationships or validity of the animals.

=== Taxa named by Marsh ===
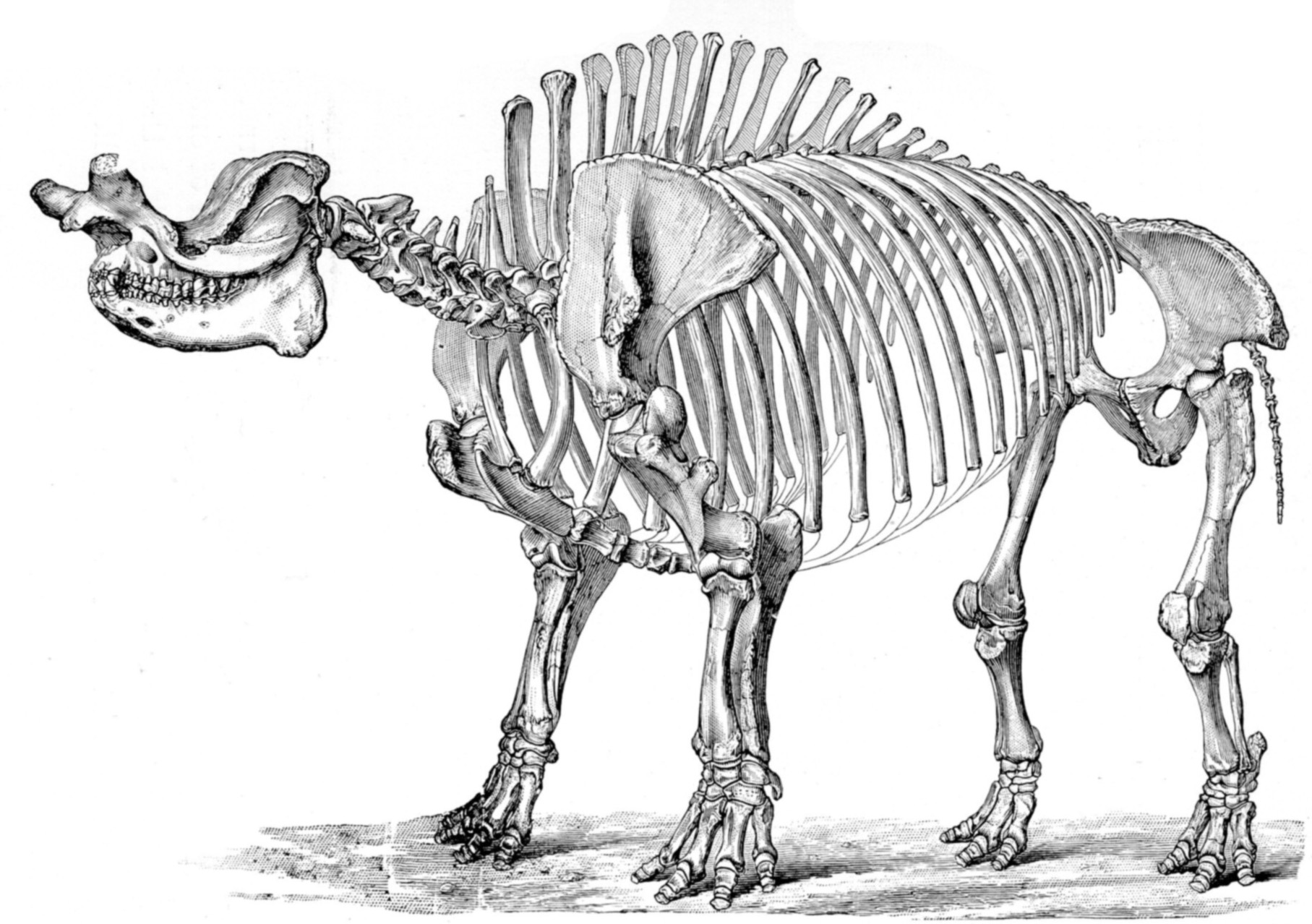
Brontops robustus skeleton restored by F. Berger under the direction of Othniel Charles Marsh (1889)

Marsh's studies of brontotheres began in 1870, when he led an expedition to northern Colorado on behalf of Yale College. During the expedition, Marsh's crew were shown a brontothere jaw by a group of Lakota, who told them of their legends of wakíŋyaŋ ("thunder beasts"). The expedition collected a large number of brontothere fossils, including jaws, skulls and postcranial elements. In honor of Lakota legends, Marsh named the new genus Brontotherium ("thunder beast") in 1873. Marsh's 1873 description of Brontotherium gigas was the most important contribution to brontothere knowledge up until that time. The type specimen was designated as another lower jaw, but Marsh was able to for the first time correctly describe several features of both the jaws and the rest of the skeleton. Marsh also recognized Brontotherium as a "true perissodactyl with limb bones resembling those of Rhinoceros", and recognized the animal's relation to Leidy's Titanotherium. Also in 1873, Marsh named the new family Brontotheriidae to contain Brontotherium and Titanotherium.

In 1875, H. C. Clifford discovered and excavated a large and relatively complete brontothere skeleton near Chadron, Nebraska. This skeleton was described by Marsh in 1887 as the type specimen of the new genus and species Brontops robustus. A correct and detailed 1889 skeletal reconstruction of the type specimen of Brontops robustus by F. Berger, made under Marsh's direction, was deemed the culmination of Marsh's brontothere work by Spencer G. Lucas in 2004.

Marsh named the following 14 species:

- Brontotherium gigas (1873). Type found in Colorado (locality unrecorded). Distinguished from Titanotherium by Marsh due to the jaw below the molars being narrower, with a nearly straight margin. The species was based on "portions of three individuals, one of which has the lower jaws and entire molar series complete". The lower jaw with complete dentition was designated as the lectotype by Osborn (1929).
- Brontotherium ingens (1873). Type found in Colorado (locality unrecorded). Marsh considered the huge horns to be the most striking feature of this taxon.
- Anisacodon montanus (1875). Type found in "northern Nebraska", probably in the badlands near White River (locality unrecorded). Distinguished by Marsh from other species by the "emargination of the extremity of the nasals, the short premaxillaries, and the rectangular form of the last upper molar". In 1876, Marsh changed the generic name to Diconodon since Anisacodon is preoccupied by a genus of insectivorans.
- Brontops robustus (1887). Type found "near the White River in northern Nebraska" (locality unrecorded). Distinguished by Marsh due to its large and massive skull, short and robust horns, and dental formula 2.1.4.31.1.4.3.
- Brontops dispar (1887). Type found in Hat Creek in Sioux County, Nebraska. Distinguished by Marsh from B. robustus by less massive and more elongate skull, and a more slender lower jaw.
- Menops varians (1887). Type found in the "Brontotherium beds of Dakota" (locality unrecorded). Considered by Marsh to be most similar to Diconodon, but differing in having two upper incisors on each side.
- Titanops curtus (1887). Type found in Colorado (locality unrecorded). Distinguished by Marsh through its large size, long and narrow skull, short nasal bones, and "lofty, flat [horns]". The upper molars have two inner cones, supposedly distinguishing it from Brontotherium.
- Titanops elatus (1887). Type found in the "Upper Titanotherium zone, South Dakota" (locality unrecorded). Distinguished by Marsh from T. curtus by much longer nasal bones, and a higher occipital crest.
- Allops serotinus (1887). Type found at Quinn Draw, South Dakota. Distinguished from the similar Brontotherium by Marsh through having only a single pair of upper incisors, and the last molar having a more strongle developed posterior inner cone.
- Diploclonus amplus (1890). Type found in the "Brontotherium beds of South Dakota" (locality unrecorded). The skull's most distinguishing feature is the presence of prominent knobs on both horns, giving them a "branched" appearance.
- Teleodus avus (1890). Type found five miles west of the Cheyenne River, "midway between French and Battle Creek". Incorrect locality data reported in some later publications. Marsh purchased the fossil from L. W. Stilwell of Deadwood, South Dakota. Supposedly distinguished by the presence of six (rather than four) lower incisors.
- Allops crassicornis (1891). Type found in the "Brontotherium beds of South Dakota" (locality unrecorded).
- Brontops validus (1891). Type found in the "middle portion of the middle Titanotherium beds, White River, South Dakota" (locality unrecorded).
- Titanops medius (1891). Type found "near the top of the Brontotherium beds of South Dakota" (locality unrecorded).
Marsh's taxa (1873–1891), type specimens

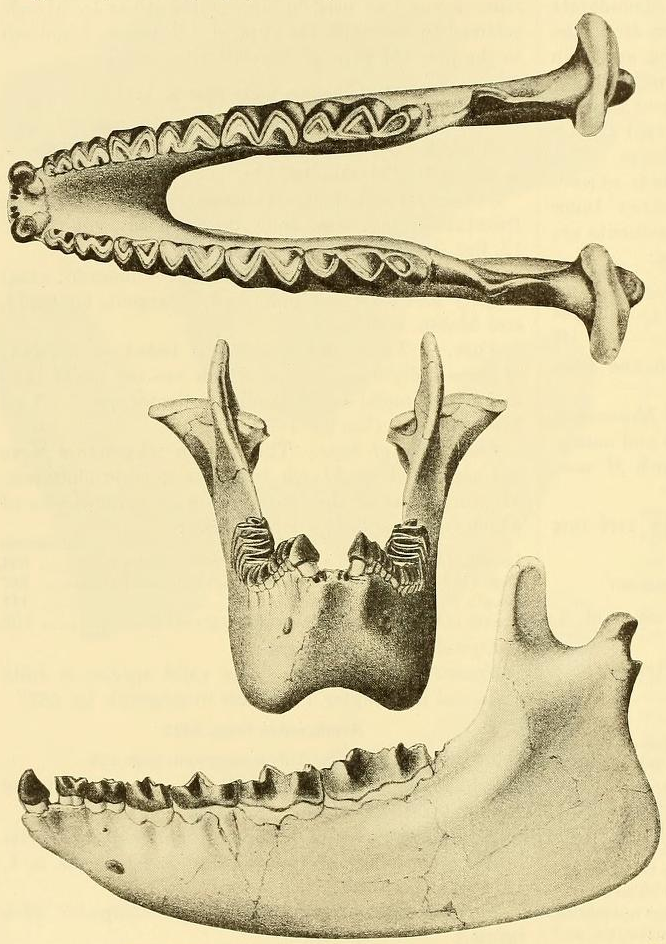
Brontotherium gigas, lower jaw (lectotype)

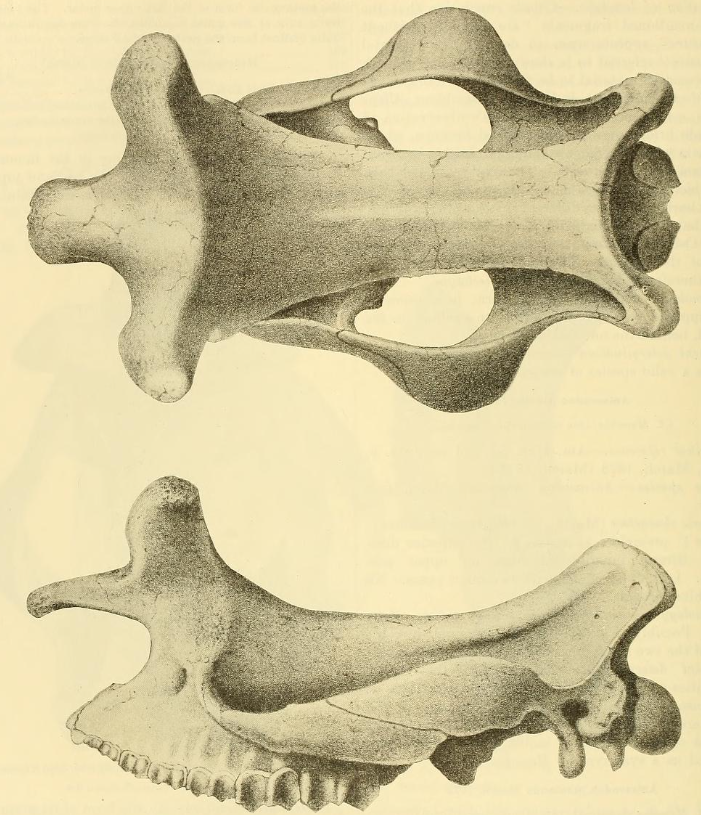
Brontotherium ingens, skull

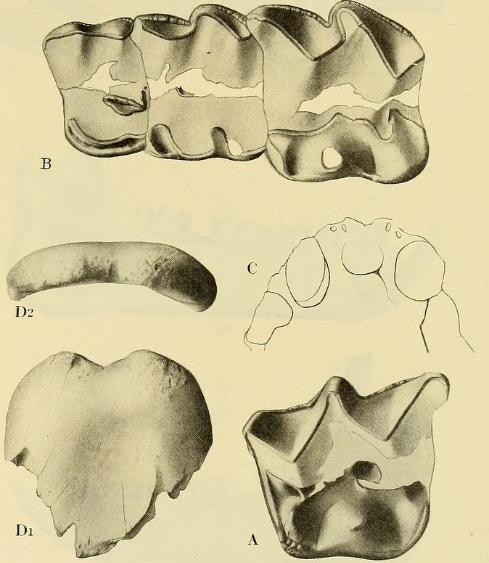
Anisacodon montanus, skull fragments

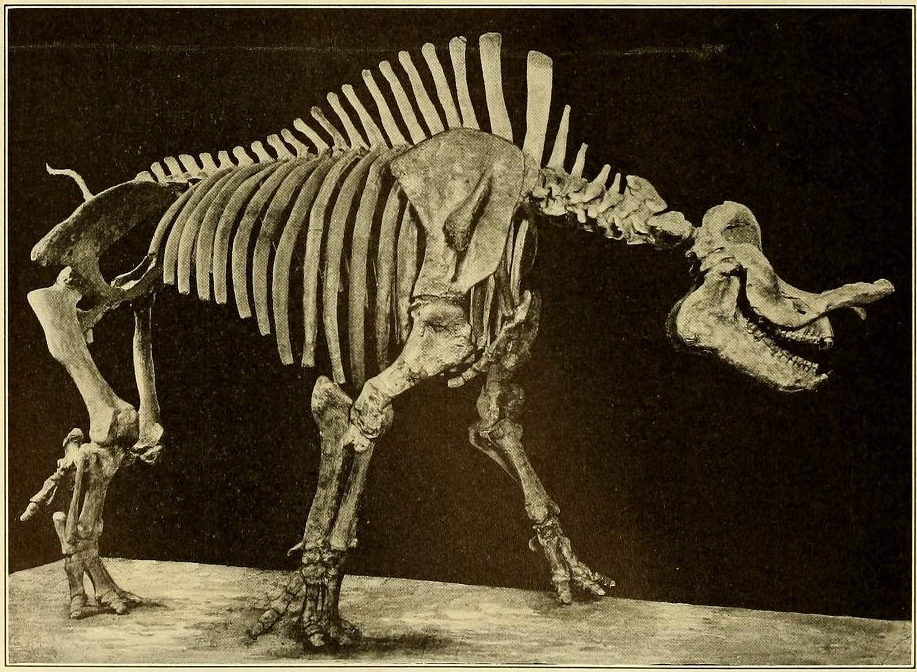
Brontops robustus, skull and skeleton

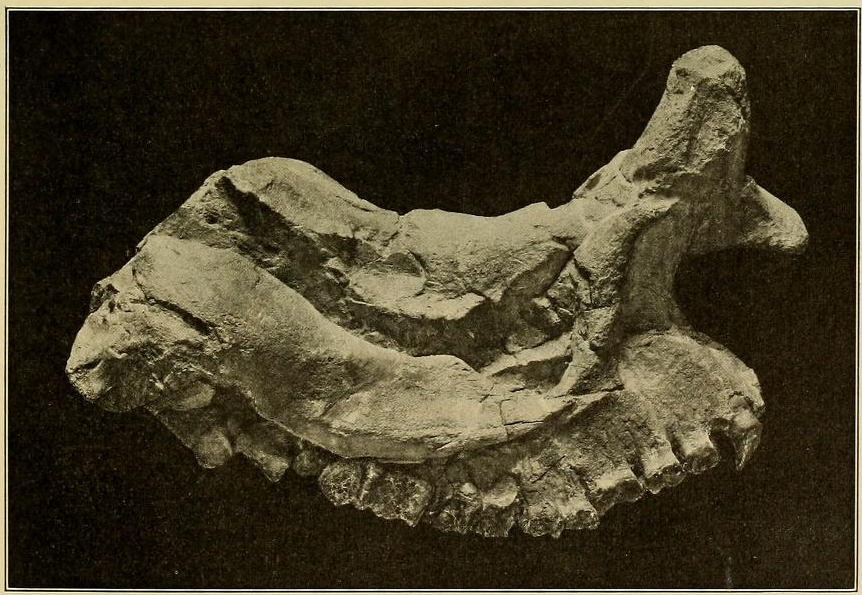
Brontops dispar, nearly complete skull

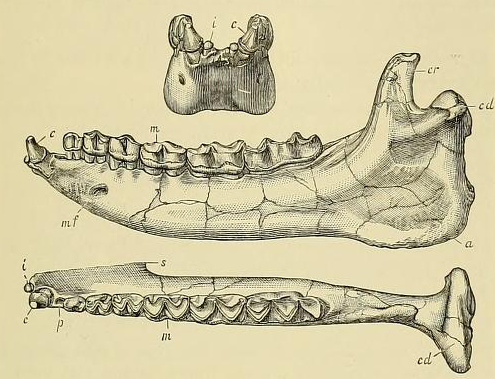
Brontops dispar, jaw associated with the skull

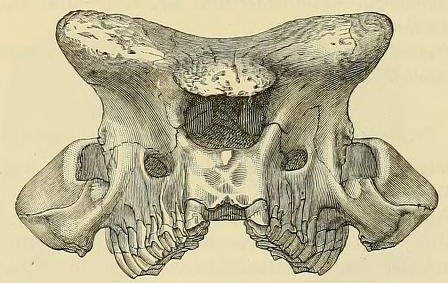
Menops varians, skull

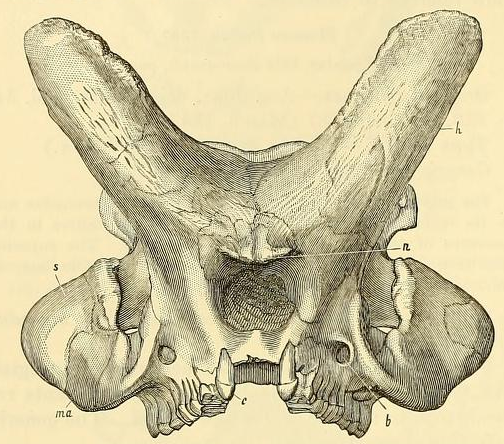
Titanops curtus, skull (YPM 12013)

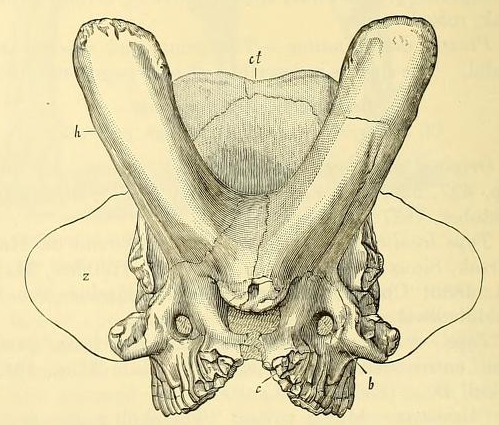
Titanops elatus, skull and jaws (only skull shown in image) (YPM 12061)

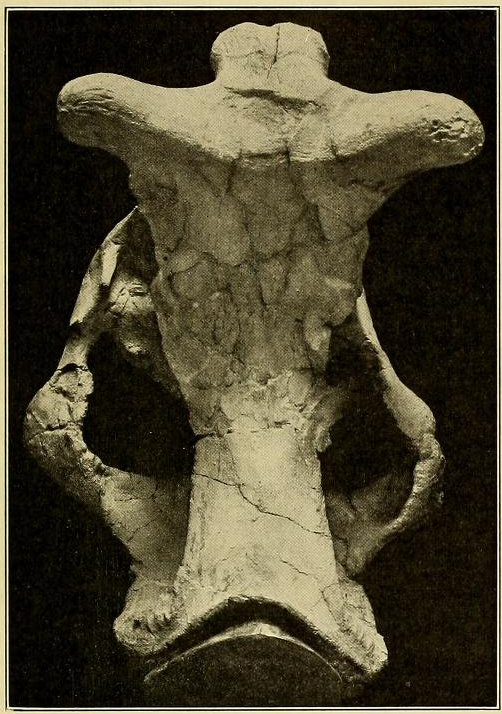
Allops serotinus, skull

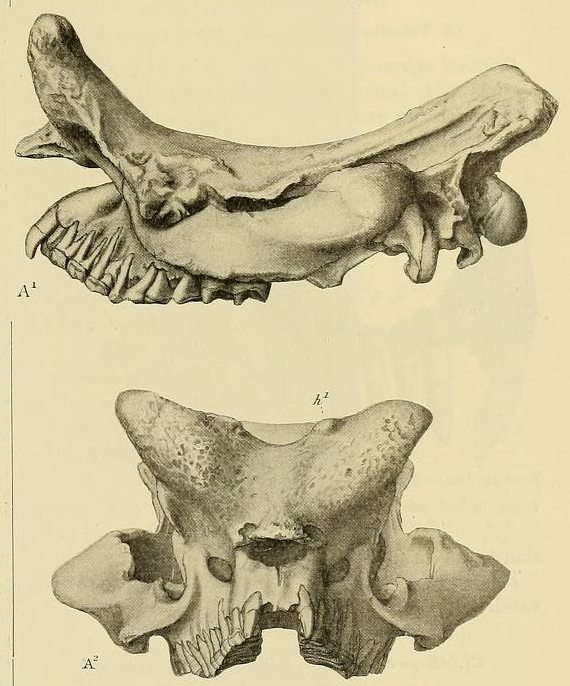
Diploclonus amplus, skull

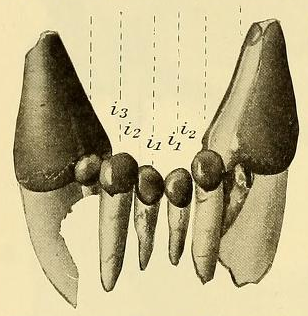
Teleodus avus, lower jaw (only incisors and canines shown in image) (YPM 10321)

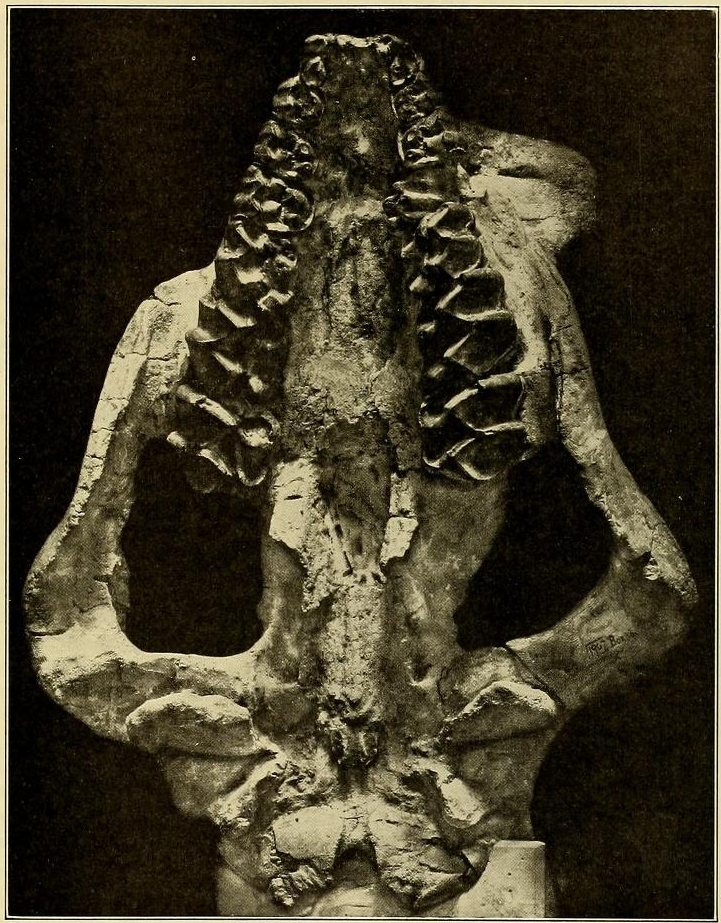
Allops crassicornis, skull

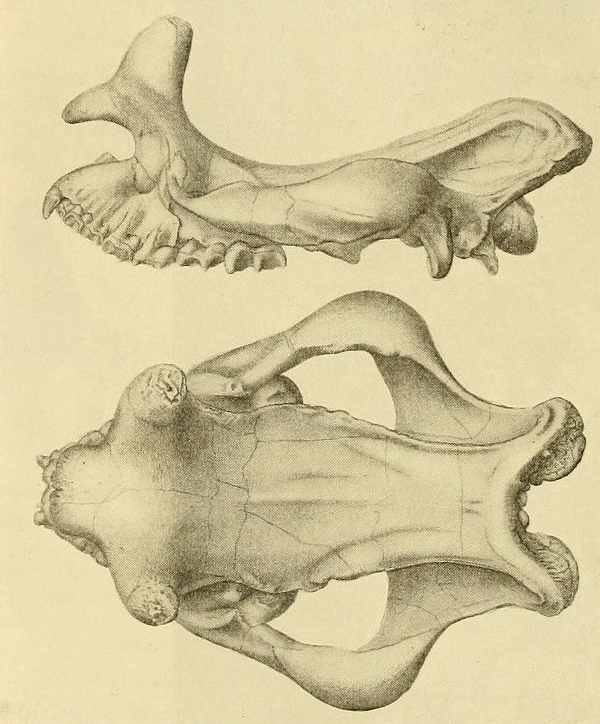
Brontops validus, skull

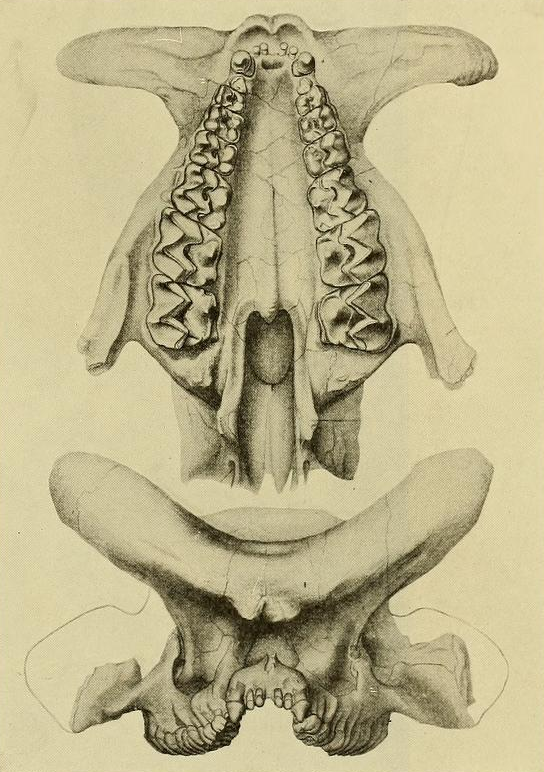
Titanops medius, skull

=== Taxa named by Cope ===
Cope named the following 12 species:

- Symborodon torvus (1873). Type found at Horsetail Creek in Logan County, Colorado. Distinguished from Titanotherium by Cope through only having three premolars, and from Brontotherium by lacking incisors. Originally described with two cotypes but mostly based on a lower jaw, which was later regarded as the lectotype by Osborn (1929).
- Miobasileus ophryas (1873). Type found at Cedar Creek in Logan County, Colorado. The type and only specimen, a skull with incomplete dentition and no associated jaw, was left in the field and lost. Distinguished by Cope from other species by the form and position of the horns, which have elliptic bases.
- Megaceratops acer (1873). Type found at Horsetail Creek in Logan County, Colorado. Cope did not intend to erect Megaceratops as a new genus, instead using it as a replacement name for Megacerops on "etymologic grounds". Osborn (1929) designated Megaceratops as a junior synonym of Megacerops.
- Megaceratops heloceras (1873). Type found at Horsetail Creek in Logan County, Colorado. Distinguished by Cope from other species by lacking T-shaped cross ridges on its molars.
- Symborodon bucco (1873). Type found at Horsetail Creek in Logan County, Colorado. Distinguished by Cope from other species by features of the horns, nasals, orbits, and especially the "enormous buccal expansion of the zygomata". Described with several cotypes, including two skulls and postcranial elements. The most complete skull was regarded as the lectotype by Osborn (1929).
- Symborodon altirostris (1873). Type found at Cedar Creek in Logan County, Colorado. Distinguished by Cope by the high position of the nasal bones.
- Symborodon trigonoceras (1873). Type found at Horsetail Creek in Logan County, Colorado. Described with two cotype skulls, the best preserved skull was regarded as the lectotype by Osborn (1929).
- Symborodon hypoceras (1874). Type found at Cedar Creek in Logan County, Colorado. Described based on several skull fragments, which Cope believed came from the same animal. Cope mistakenly believed that the species had two pairs of horns. Osborn (1929) disagreed that the fossils (several later lost) came from the same animal and regarded one of Cope's horns as the lectotype.
- Menodus angustigenis (1886). Type found at Swift Current Creek in Assiniboia, Canada. First brontothere fossils to be reported from Canada. Described with several cotypes, including jaws. A mandibular symphysis, from which the species evidently got its name, was designated as the lectotype by Osborn (1929). Moved by Cope to the distinct genus Haplacodon in 1889, distinguished by Cope by having only a single internal cusp on the fourth upper premolar.
- Menodus selwynianus (1889). Type found at Swift Current Creek in Assiniboia, Canada. Nasal bones shorter than in the type specimen of Megacerops coloradensis.
- Menodus syceras (1889). Type found at Swift Current Creek in Assiniboia, Canada. Distinguished by Cope by the "very close approximation of the basis of the horns and the presence of a strong angle or ridge connecting them". Named based on several cotypes, the lectotype was designated among these by Osborn (1929) since it is the fossil that shows the supposed distinguishing feature.
- Menodus peltoceras (1891). Type found in the "Titanotherium beds of northern Nebraska" (locality unrecorded). Distinguished by Cope by the "immense transverse extent of the [horns] and their complete fusion into an osseous wall which extends across the muzzle, forming a huge plate or shield".
Cope's taxa (1873–1891), type specimens

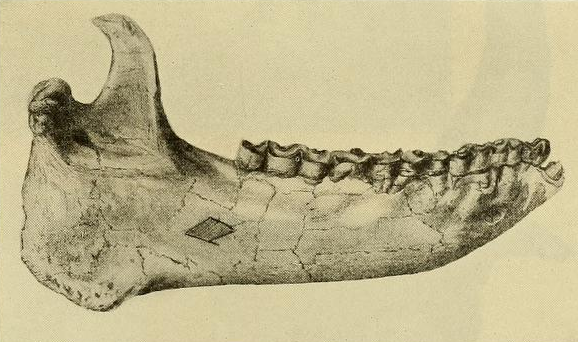
Symborodon torvus, lower jaw (lectotype)

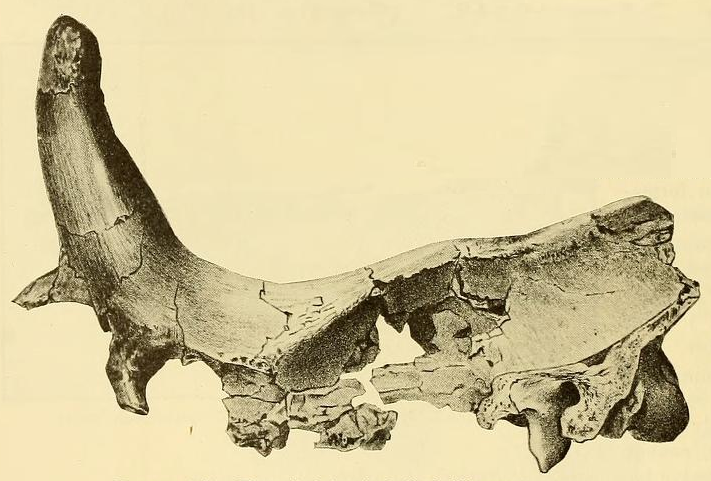
Megaceratops acer, partial skull (AMNH 6348)

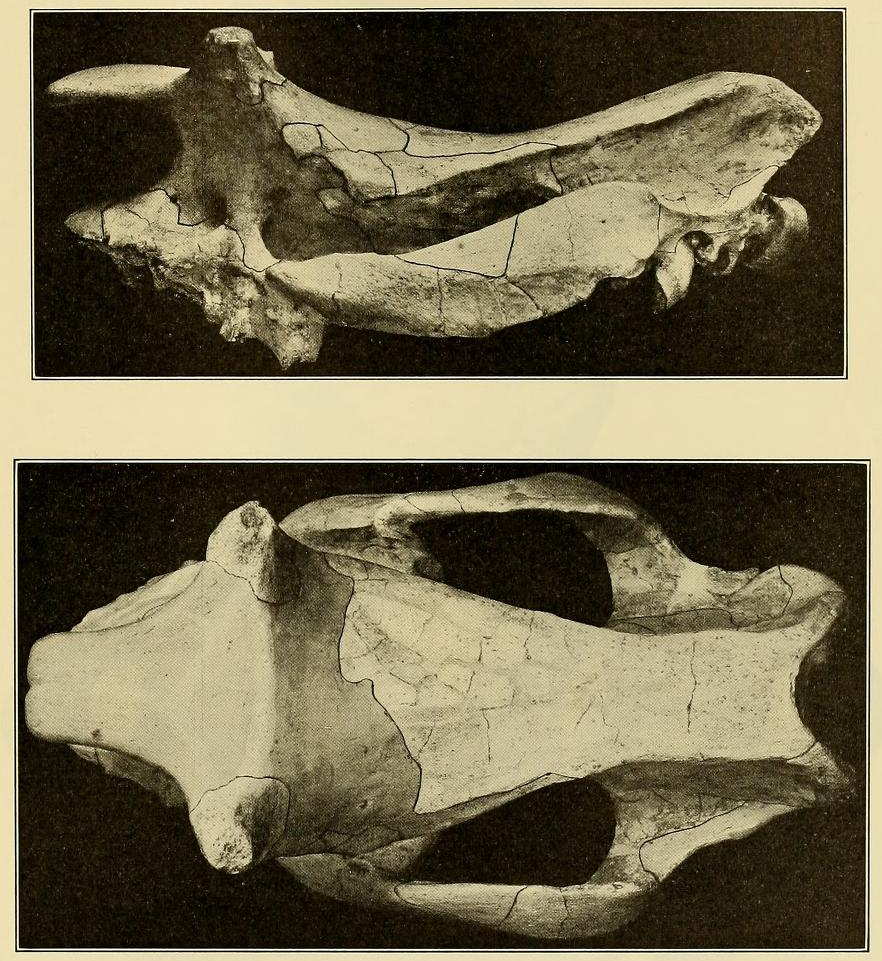
Megaceratops heloceras, skull

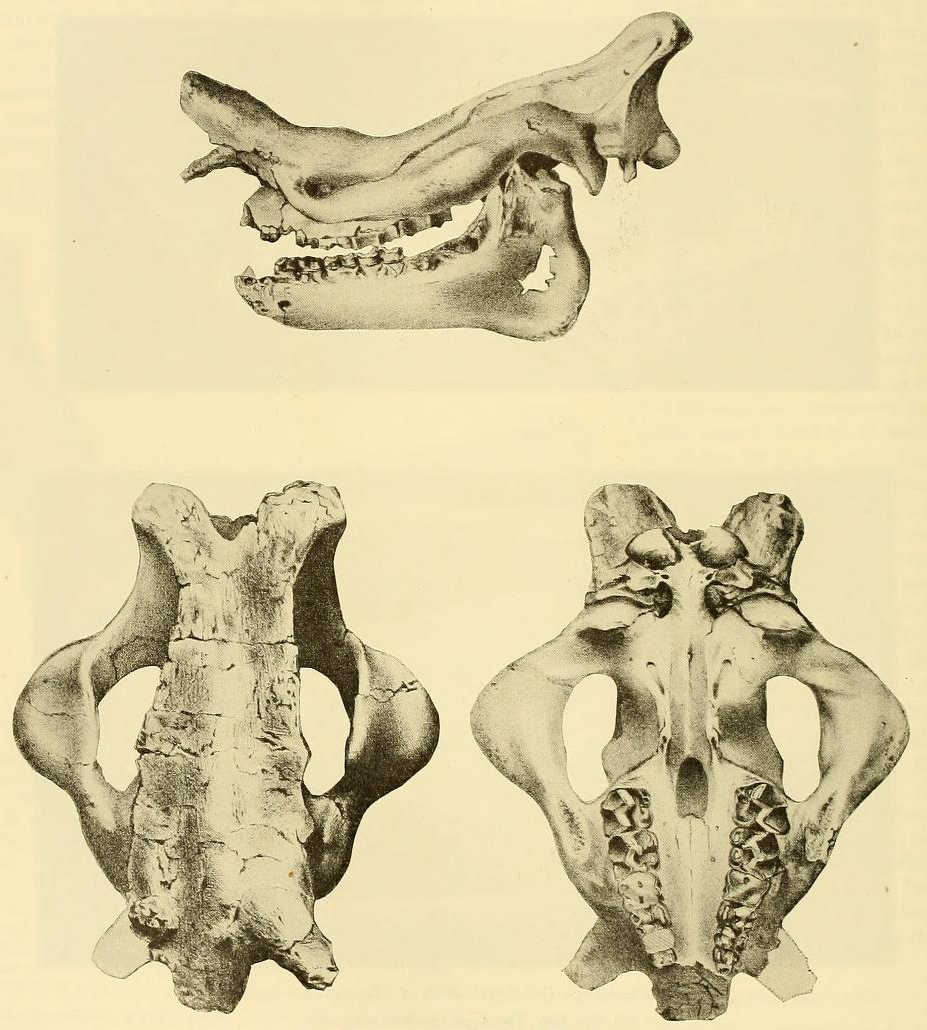
Symborodon bucco, skull (lectotype)

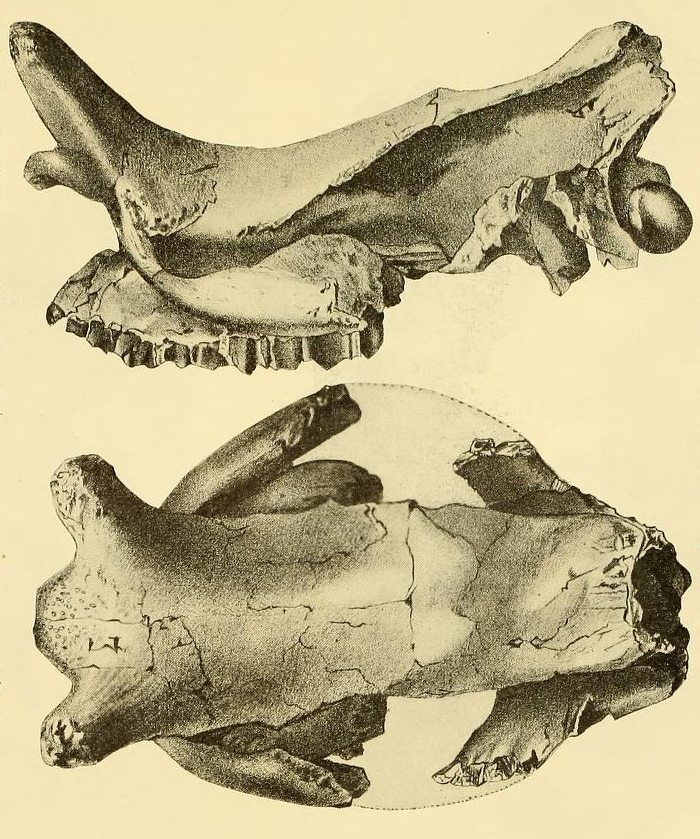
Symborodon altirostris, skull

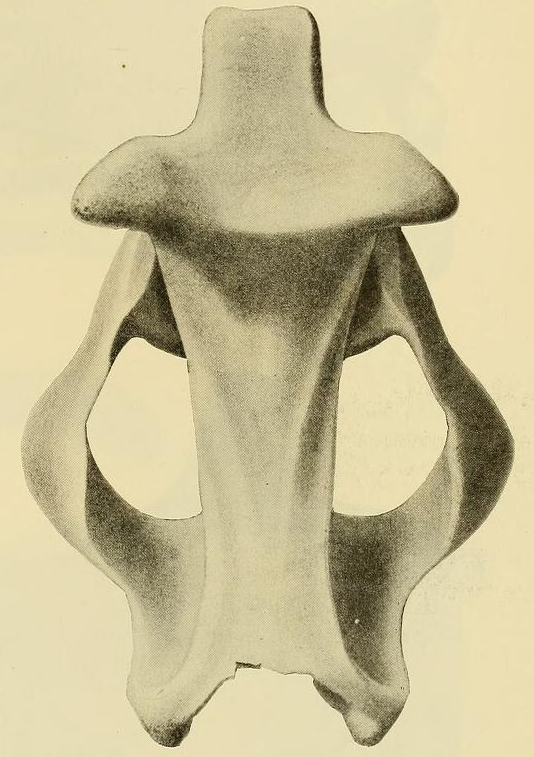
Symborodon trigonoceras, skull (lectotype)

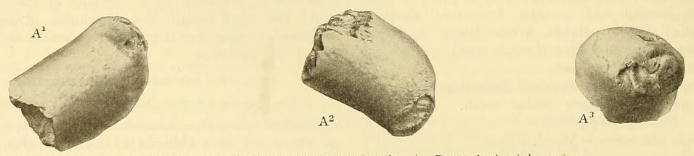
Symborodon hypoceras, horn (lectotype)

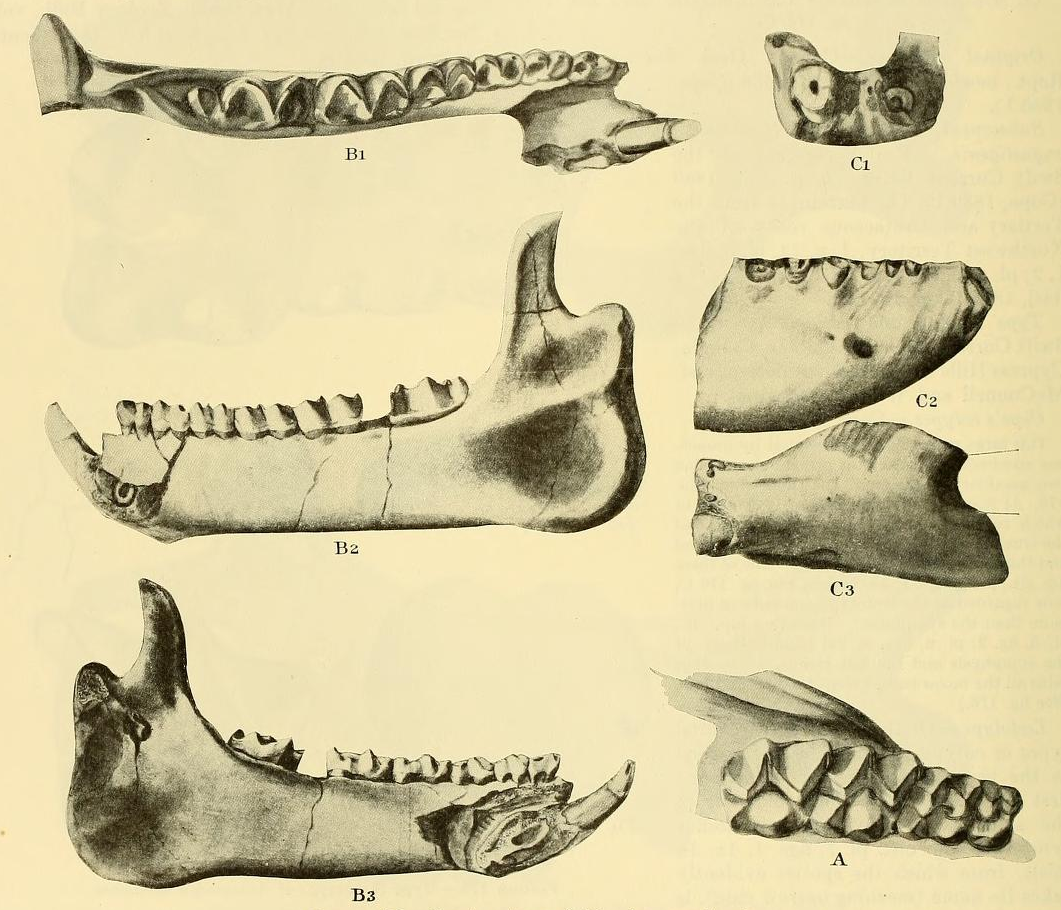
Menodus angustigenis, mandibular symphysis (C in the image) (lectotype)

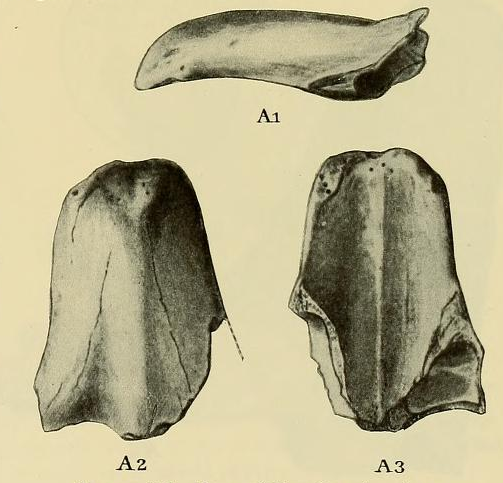
Menodus selwynianus, isolated nasal bones

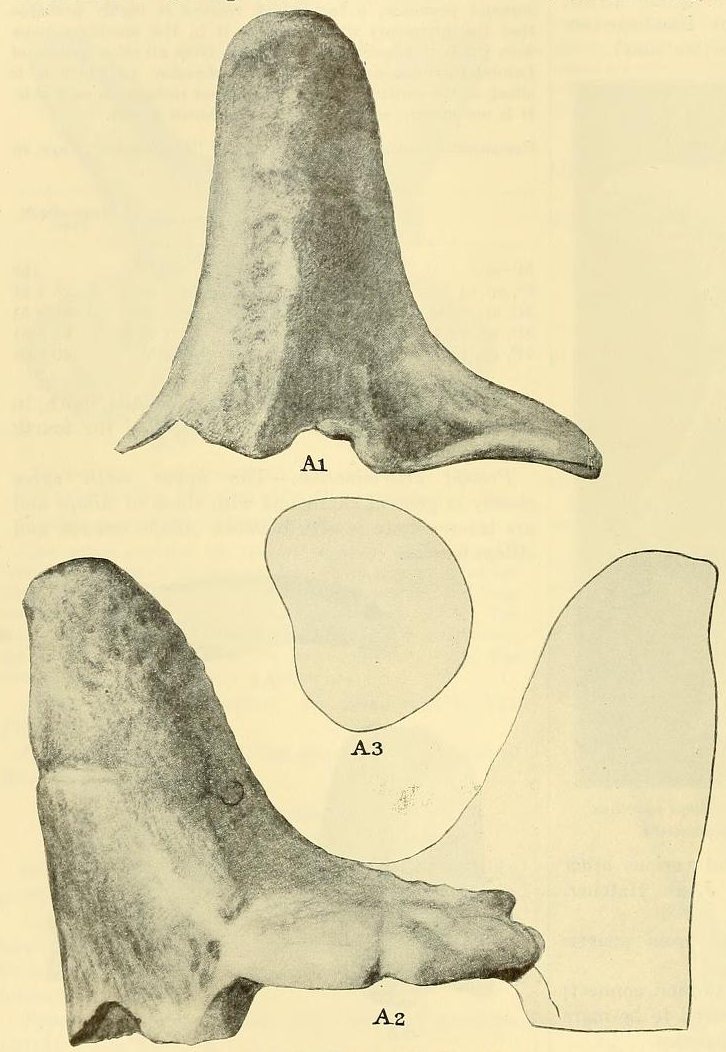
Menodus syceras, nasal bones and horn (lectotype)

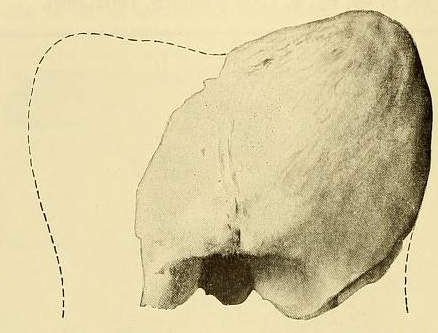
Menodus peltoceras, fused nasal bones and horns

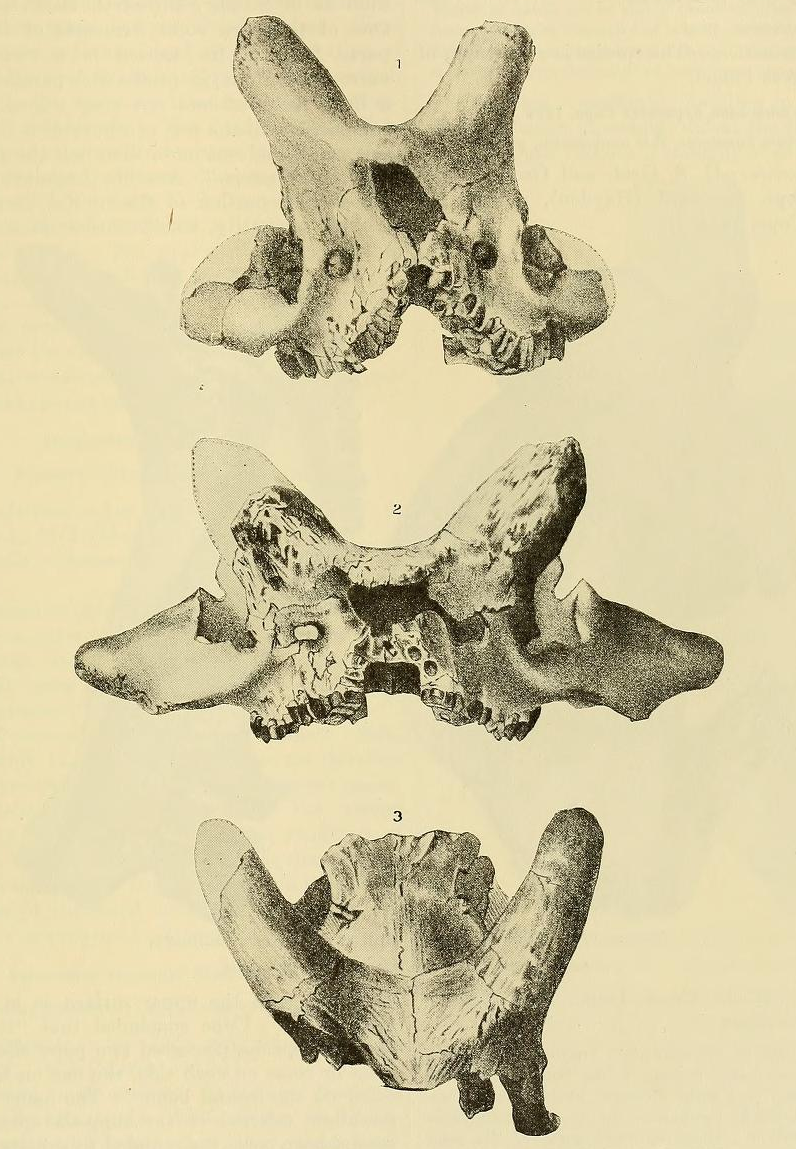
Front views of the type skulls of Symborodon altirostris (top), Symborodon bucco (middle), and Megaceratops acer (bottom)

=== Taxa and proposed revision by Scott & Osborn ===
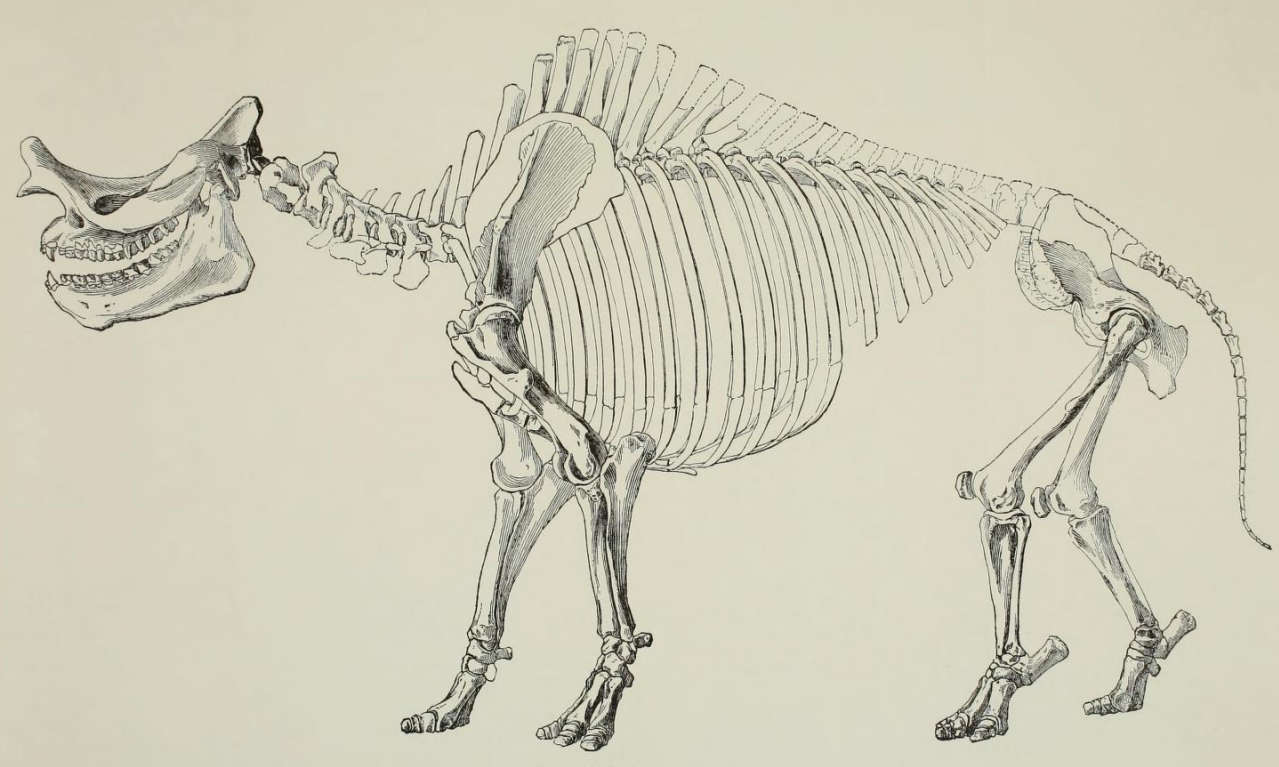
Skeletal reconstruction of "Menodus proutii" (e.g. Titanotherium proutii) by William Berryman Scott and Henry Fairfield Osborn (1887). Scott and Osborn were the first to suggest that Chadronian brontotheres all belonged to a single genus, for which they used the name Menodus.

In 1887, William Berryman Scott and Henry Fairfield Osborn published a study on fossil mammals at the Museum of Comparative Zoology, collected by Samuel Garman. The collection included three brontothere skulls, and several horns. Scott and Osborn interpreted the fossils as belonging to four or five distinguishable species. Scott and Osborn noted that it was difficult to define genera in the brontothere material, especially because skulls and jaws, where many supposed distinguishing traits were found, were rarely found in association with each other. They also noted that like in dinoceratans such as Uintatherium, the variability in various parts of the skull, especially the horns, was so great that no two brontothere skulls were exactly the same. Unlike dinoceratans, the dentition was also found to be highly variable in brontotheres. Scott and Osborn could demonstrate that the traits supposedly separating genera such as Brontotherium and Diconodon were variable in the fossil material. Brontotherium was for instance in part distinguished from Menodus by having three lower premolars instead of four, but there are brontothere skulls with three lower premolars on one side and four on the other, showing that this cannot have been a genus-differentiating feature.

Scott and Osborn questioned the validity of most of Marsh and Cope's genera, and treated the material as mostly belonging to a single genus. They used the oldest available name for the taxon, Menodus. Symborodon was noted as possibly distinct, separated by a narrowing mandibular symphysis and the total absence of lower incisors. This was provisional, since Cope's Menodus angustigenis preserved two lower incisors, and a narrowing symphysis, and these traits may thus be variable. Scott and Osborn designated Titanotherium, Megacerops, Brontotherium, and Diconodon as synonyms of Menodus, and designated the species Symborodon trigonoceras and Brontotherium ingens synonyms of M. coloradensis.

Scott and Osborn named three new brontothere species based on Garman's fossils:

- Menodus tichoceras (1887). Type found in the Big Badlands of South Dakota (locality unrecorded). Distinguished by the narrow and elevated terminal (back) portion of the skull. Noted to possibly be identical to Symborodon altirostris, depending on the number of lower incisors (which are not preserved in the type specimen).
- Menodus dolichoceras (1887). Type found in South Dakota (locality unrecorded). Compared to Megaceratops acer in most features, but much larger and more powerful than the type skull of that species, with longer and more divergent horns.
- Menodus platyceras (1887). Type found in the Big Badlands of South Dakota (locality unrecorded). Noted for extremely short and obtuse nasal bones and flattened horns.
Scott & Osborn's taxa (1887), type specimens

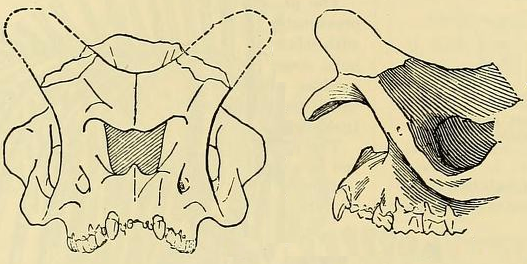
Menodus tichoceras, skull

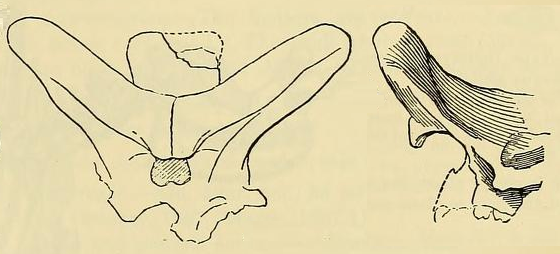
Menodus dolichoceras, incomplete skull

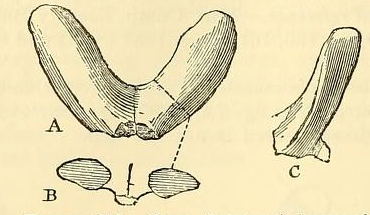
Menodus platyceras, isolated horns and nasal bones (MCZ 9160)

== Post-Bone Wars developments ==
=== Additional taxa named by Osborn ===
Henry Fairfield Osborn made the study of brontotheres one of his life's quests. From the late 19th century onwards, Osborn named several new species based on fossils collected in South Dakota. Most of the fossils Osborn worked on were collected by John Bell Hatcher and were originally intended to serve as material for a planned monograph by Marsh. In 1886–1888, Hatcher spent fifteen months in South Dakota and Nebraska, and reported that he collected "nearly 200 complete skulls and many more or less complete skeletons".

In contrast to other researchers of his time, Hatcher observed that the number of teeth appeared to not be constant, even in the same species, and that the dentition should not be used to distinguish between brontothere species or genera. Hatcher believed that all of the Chadronian brontothere material could be classified in a single, highly variable, genus, for which he preferred the name Titanotherium. In 1896, Osborn also concluded that the fossils represented a single genus; like Hatcher, he preferred the name Titanotherium, due to Marsh's incorrect assertion that Menodus was preoccupied by Menodon. Various alternate taxonomies were proposed by Osborn over the following years. In 1902, Osborn proposed that there were four genera, distinguishable by both cranial and postcranial features: Titanotherium, Megacerops, Symborodon, and Brontotherium.

Osborn named nine new brontothere species between 1896 and 1916:

- Titanotherium ramosum (1896). Type found at Quinn Draw, by White River in the Big Badlands of South Dakota. The species was mainly distinguished by Osborn by the "distal spreading or branching of the horns". Osborn considered the "great depth of the connecting crest" and the "extreme flattening of the horns" to place T. ramosum as intermediate between Titanops elatus and Menodus platyceras (both referred to Titanotherium by Osborn at this time).
- Megacerops brachycephalus (1902). Type found in the Big Badlands of South Dakota (locality unrecorded). A small form with and broad skull, "very rudimentary second internal cones upon the upper premolars", elongated nasals that narrow anteriorly, and horns with an oval cross-section shape.
- Megacerops bicornutus (1902). Type found at Quinn Draw. Similar to Menodus selwynianus (referred to Megacerops by Osborn at this time), but distinguished by Osborn through larger size and slightly wider nasal bones.
- Megacerops marshi (1902). Type found in the Big Badlands of South Dakota (locality unrecorded). Osborn (1929) notes its provenance as "probably Cheyenne River badlands". Similar to Symborodon trigonoceras but distinguished by Osborn by the horns, which are more similar to M. brachycephalus and Brontops robustus. Incisors "22?".
- Brontotherium leidyi (1902). Type found in the Big Badlands of South Dakota (locality unrecorded). Osborn lists B. leidyi's features as "nasals elongate, narrowing anteriorly. Horns very short, slightly recurved, of transverse oval section. Canines stout and blunt. Premolars noncingulate, with rounded contours and well-developed tetartocones. 2–1 upper incisors".
- Brontotherium hatcheri (1908). Type found in the Big Badlands of South Dakota (locality unrecorded). Osborn believed this species to represent "an early phase of evolution of B. gigas".
- Symborodon copei (1908). Type found in the Big Badlands of South Dakota (locality unrecorded).
- Allops walcotti (1916). Type found in the Big Badlands of South Dakota (locality unrecorded). Osborn (1929) notes its provenance as "probably Corral Draw". Osborn noted that the skull was narrow and elongate, partly due to some crushing, but that it was otherwise highly similar to the skull of Allops marshi (i.e. Megacerops marshi).
- Megacerops riggsi (1916). Type found at Horsetail Creek in northeastern Colorado. Distinguished by Osborn from other species by having a very massive jaw despite also being relatively small in size.
Osborn's taxa (1896–1916), type specimens

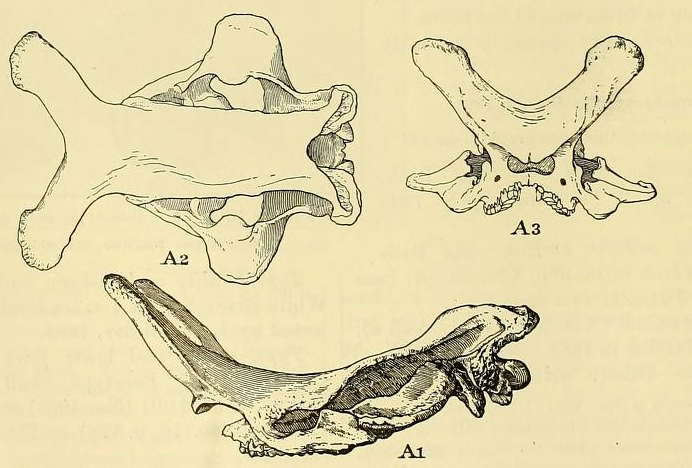
Titanotherium ramosum, skull (AMNH 1447)

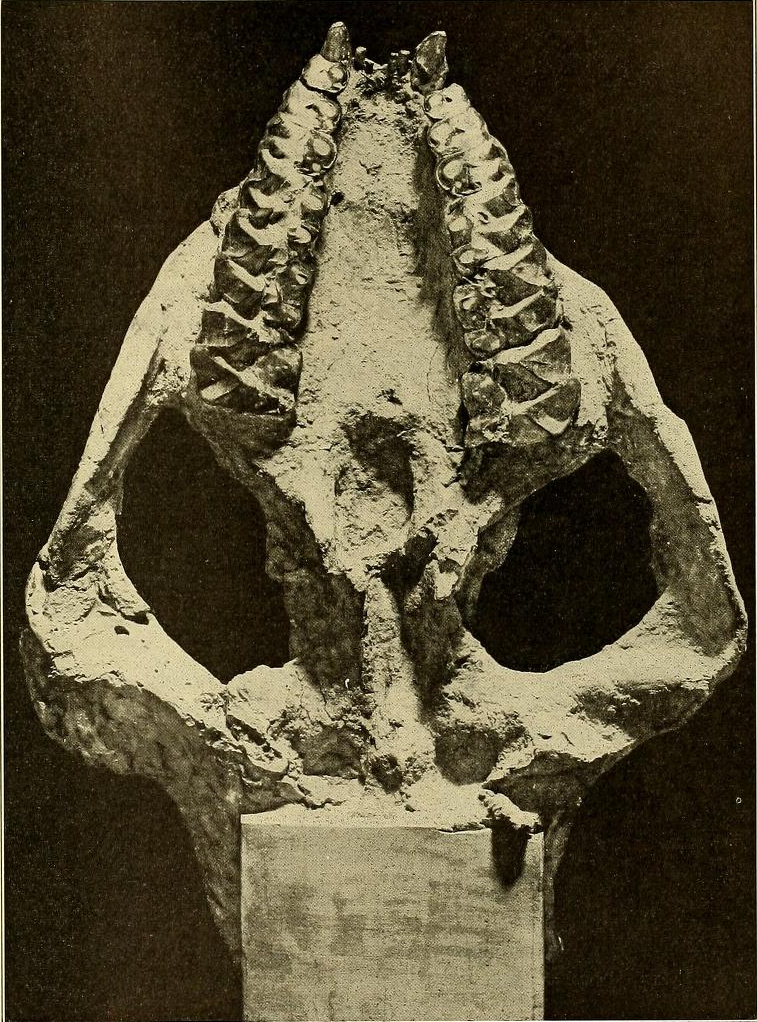
Megacerops brachycephalus, complete skull

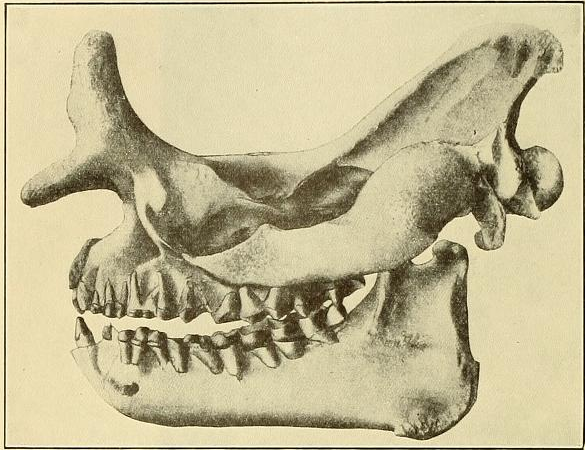
Megacerops bicornutus, skull and lower jaws

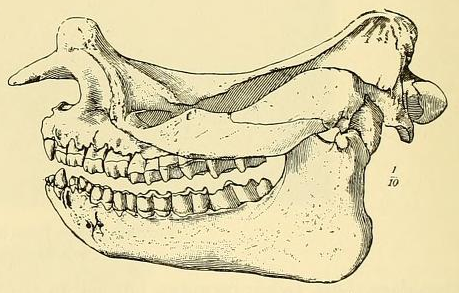
Megacerops marshi, complete skull

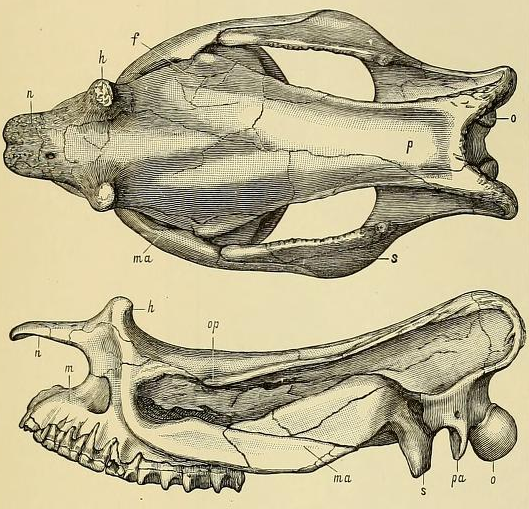
Brontotherium leidyi, complete skull

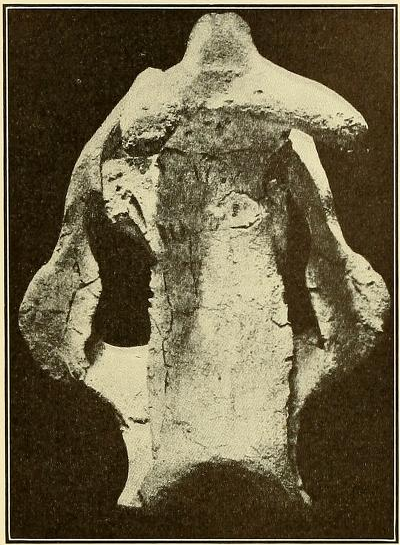
Brontotherium hatcheri, nearly complete skull

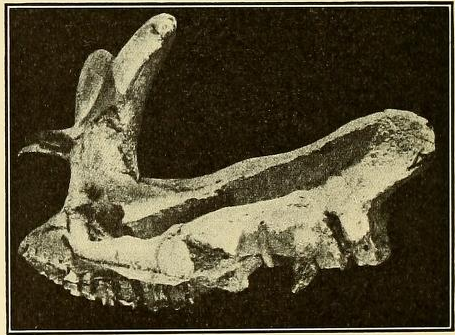
Symborodon copei, complete skull

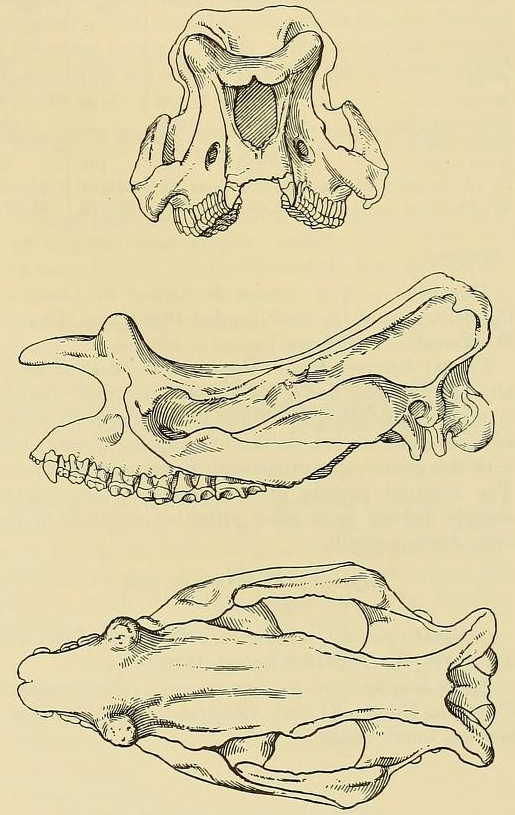
Allops walcotti, nearly complete skull

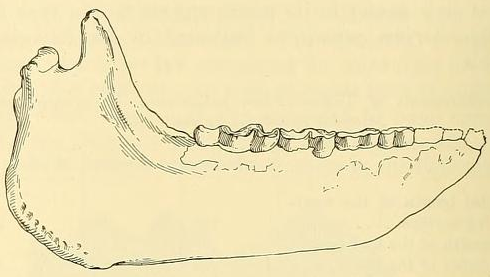
Megacerops riggsi, nearly complete lower jaw

=== Taxa named by Lull and Lambe ===
In 1905, Richard Swann Lull named the new species Megacerops tyleri, based on a skull, limbs, and vertebrae of a single individual. The fossils were found by T. C. Brown, part of a 1904 (Note: Osborn (1929) incorrectly stated that the fossil was found in 1903.) paleontological expedition of Amherst College. Brown found the fossils on the north side of Spring Draw basin, about ten miles from the mouth of Bear Creek, a tributary of the Cheyenne River, in South Dakota. Lull compared the fossils to Megacerops bicornutus and "Megacerops (Diploclonus) amplus", and stated that the new form "[agreed] with both in the possession of hornlets, and with one of the other in minor characters, but [differed] in general contour of the skull and horns."

In 1908, Lawrence Lambe named two new species of Megacerops from Canada, Megacerops primitivus and Megacerops assiniboiensis, both based on fossil jaw material collected in the Cypress Hills of Saskatchewan. M. primitivus was based on two halves of the lower jaw, of which the left side preserved a complete set of teeth. The most notable feature of the jaw was the presence of three pairs of incisors, a feature otherwise seen only in Marsh's Teleodus avus. M. primitivus was distinguished from T. avus by Lambe by several other features of the teeth, including the presence of four (and not three) premolars, and noted that the "general character of the dentition" suggested that M. primitivus belonged to Megacerops. M. assiniboiensis was based on a more fragmentary fossil, a left mandibular ramus. Lambe noted that the incomplete fossil made definite characterization of the species impossible, but that the fossil was provisionally referred to a new species due to several possibly unique features, most notably that the jaw was both robust and relatively short.

Lull (1905) and Lambe (1908)'s taxa, type specimens

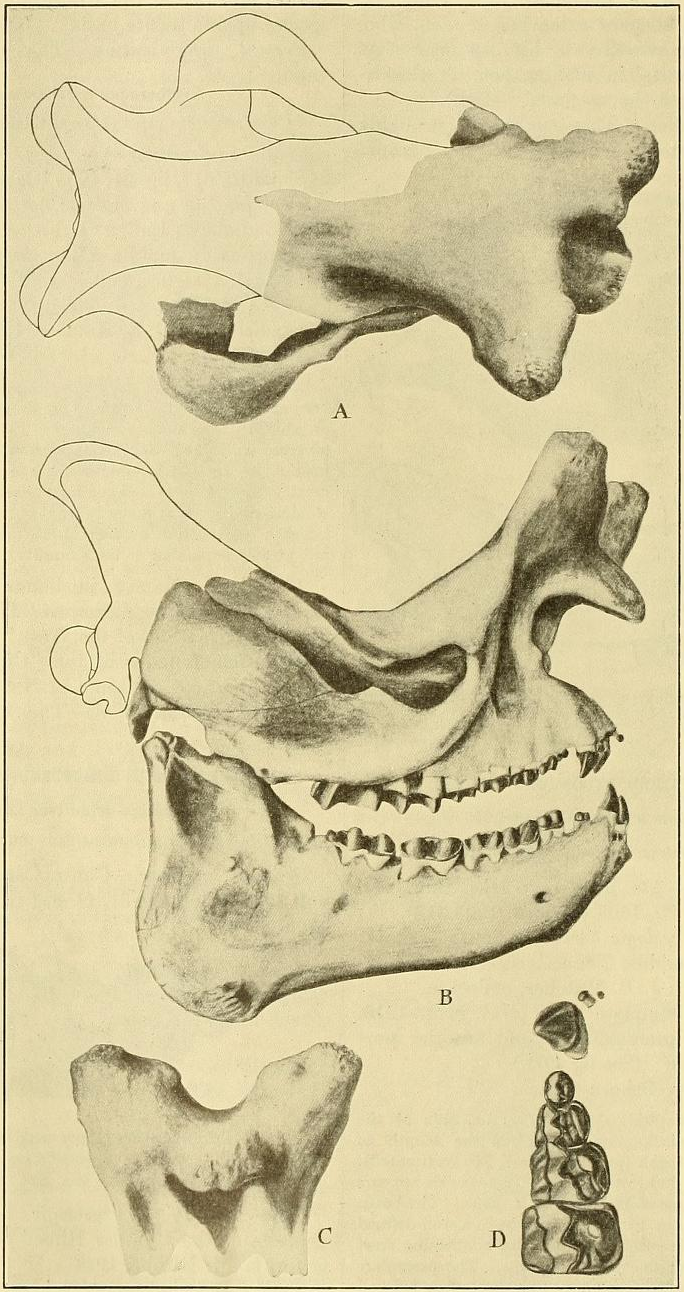
Megacerops tyleri, associated skull, limbs, and vertebrae (only skull shown in image)

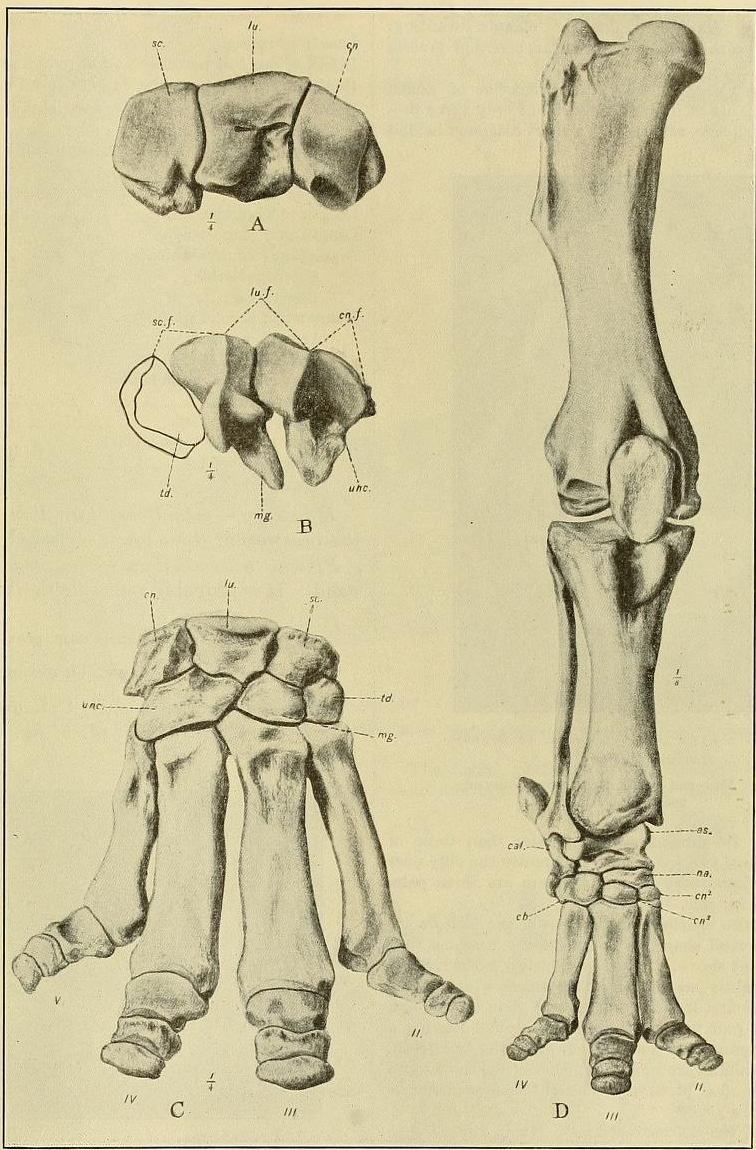
Megacerops tyleri, associated skull, limbs, and vertebrae (only manus and hind limb shown in image)

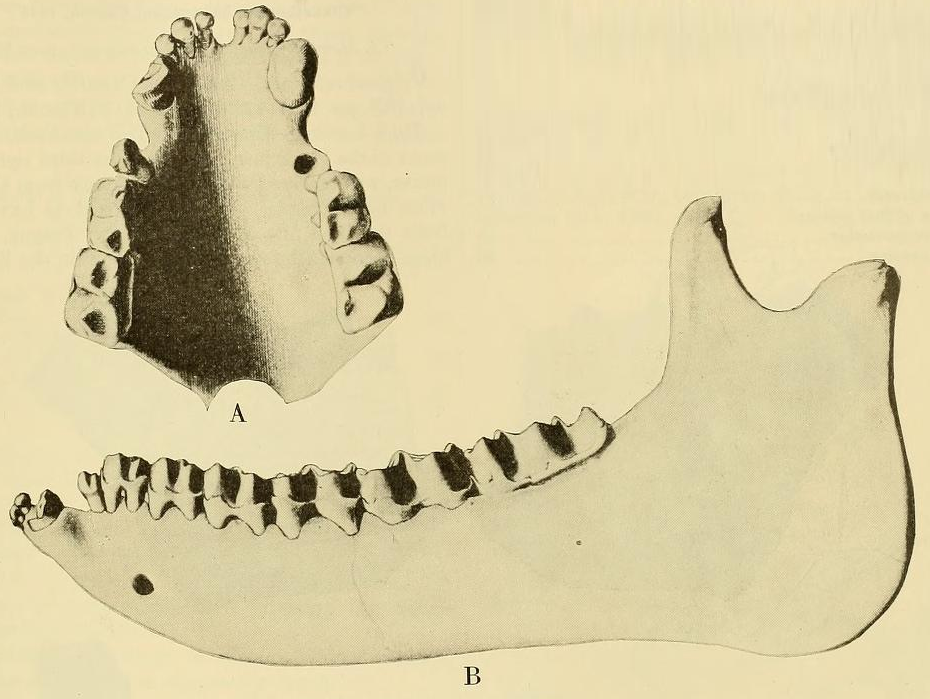
Megacerops primitivus, lower jaw

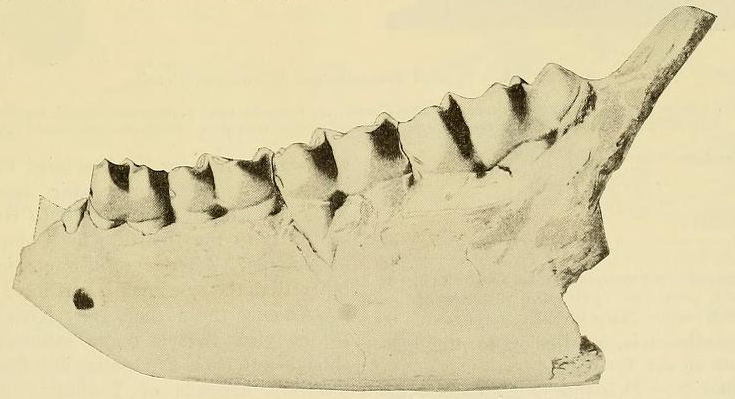
Megacerops assiniboiensis, mandibular ramus (partial lower jaw)

=== Purported discoveries in Europe ===
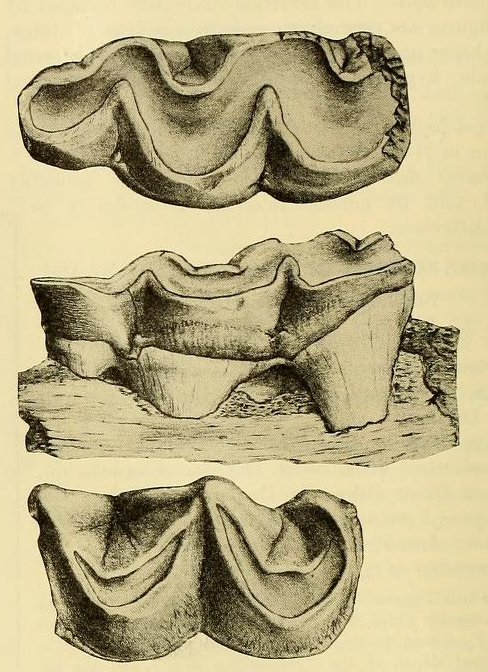
Cotype specimens of Menodus? rumelicus

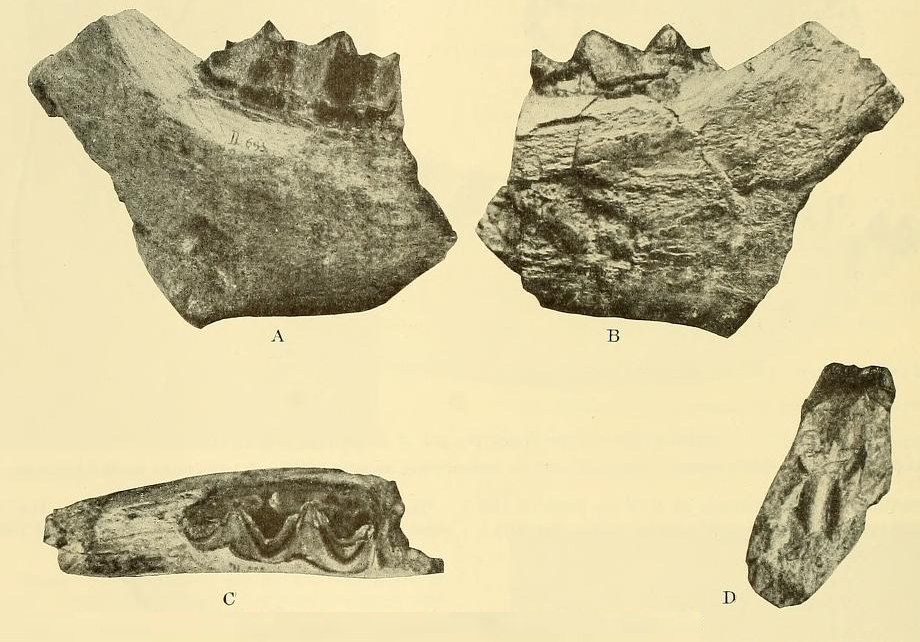
Type specimen of Titanotherium bohemicum

In 1892, Franz Toula described Menodus? rumelicus as the first Megacerops-like brontothere reported from Europe. The species was based on a third right lower molar and part of the right ramus of the lower jaw. Toula received these fossils from his friend G. N. Zlatarski in Sofia, and wrote that they had originally been found in heaps of material dug up near a railroad close to Kajali, northwest of Burgas in Eastern Rumelia (modern-day Bulgaria). In his 1929 monograph, Osborn accepted the species as a brontothere and a valid taxon, and referred it to Brontotherium as "Brontotherium rumelicum". Eocene brontothere premolars later discovered near the Black Sea coast of Bulgaria have also been referred to M.? rumelicus. Due to their similarity to teeth of Sivatitanops, a dubious brontothere genus known from Myanmar, Ivan Nikolov and Kurt Heissig assigned these teeth, and M.? rumelicus itself, to Sivatitanops in 1985. Spencer G. Lucas and Robert M. Schoch questioned this in 1989 and deemed M.? rumelicus to be a nomen dubium. Several researchers have suggested that the M.? rumelicus type specimen is actually a fossil imported from the United States, perhaps by Bulgarian laborers returning home.

In 1913, a second European species was named by Eugeniusz Kiernik, Titanotherium bohemicum. T. bohemicum was based on a fragmentary lower jaw, supposedly found in lime pits in Podbaba, near Prague. The fossil changed hands several times before coming into Kiernik's possession. Kiernik mentioned that the fossil could have been imported from the United States but was convinced that it had been found in Bohemia and suggested that the fossil was from Tertiary deposits at Tuchořice, not from Prodbaba. Kiernik compared the fossil to those of Menodus rumelicus and Brachydiastematherium (a brontothere known from Romania) but concluded that it was most similar in size and morphology to the American Titanotherium. Osborn (1929) suggested that the fossil belonged to the American species Menodus giganteus, and that it was probably an American fossil that had become mixed in with fossils collected in Prodbaba. Lucas & Schoch (1989) considered T. bohemicum to be a nomen dubium.

== Osborn's 1929 taxonomy ==
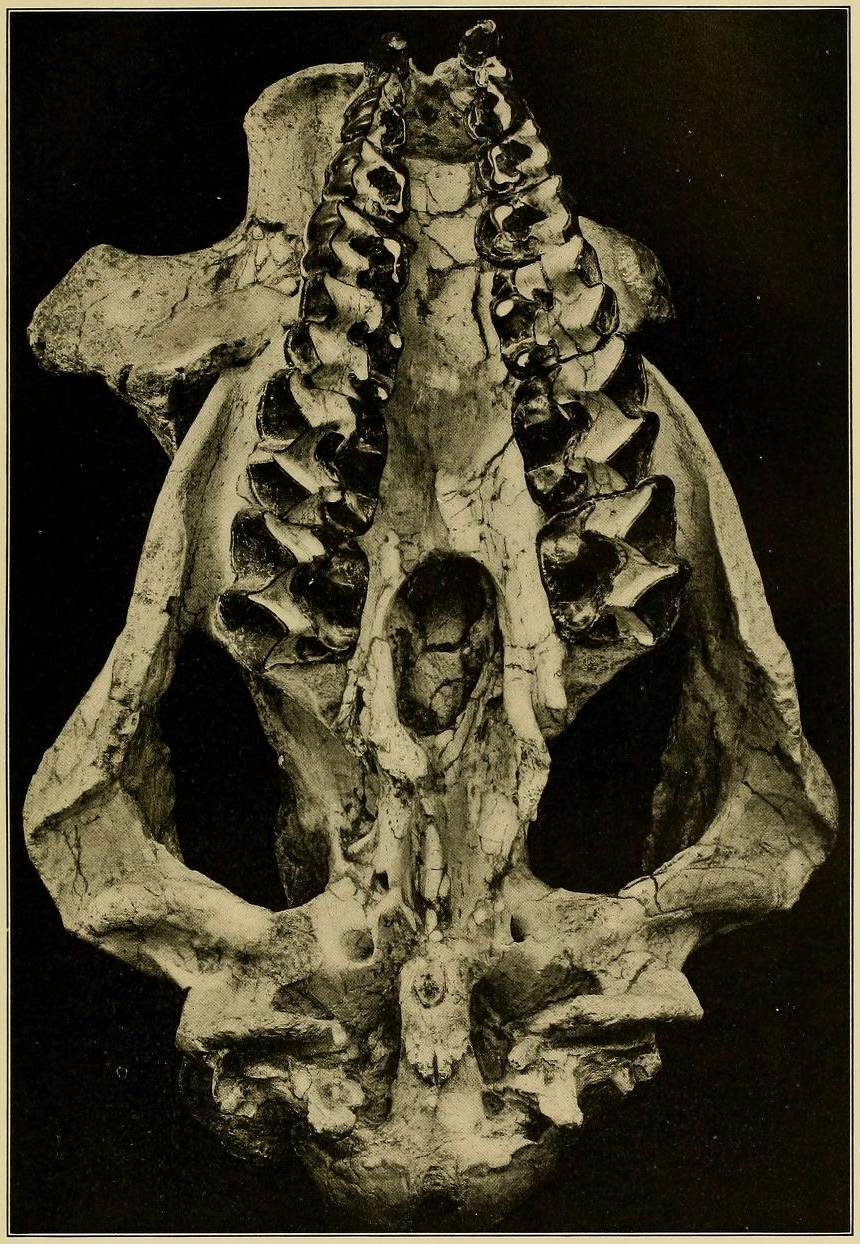
AMNH 505, a skull proposed as the neotype specimen of Menodus giganteus by Henry Fairfield Osborn (1929)

In 1929, Osborn published a two-volume monograph on brontothere taxonomy and evolution, The Titanotheres of Ancient Wyoming, Dakota, and Nebraska. Osborn believed that the monograph would be the definitive work on brontotheres and that it was "by far the most profound study of a central family history [of animals] that has ever been made." According to Donald Prothero, Osborn was "known for his pompous attitude and huge ego as well as for his unorthodox ideas about evolution that none of his peers accepted." Osborn believed in orthogenesis, an obsolete hypothesis that evolution was driven not only by natural selection, but also by a mysterious and innate driving force pushing the evolution of organisms in specific directions. Orthogenesis influenced Osborn's taxonomy, as he recognized several different lineages of brontotheres, evolving in similar ways parallel to each other.

Osborn's monograph recognized 37 species of Chadronian brontotheres, grouped into seven genera and four subfamilies. Some species were deemed to be based on indeterminate fossils (such as Miobasileus ophryas) and some species were designated as junior synonyms of others, such as Megacerops assiniboiensis as a synonym of Brontotherium (Titanops) curtus, and Diconodon montanus as a synonym of Menodus giganteus. In some cases, Osborn also deemed previous species-level distinctions to be due to sexual dimorphism, for instance proposing that Menodus peltoceras was a female specimen of "one of the long-horned species of Brontotherium". Nevertheless, almost every well-preserved brontothere skull was concluded to belong to a separate species. The brontothere species as understood by Osborn are not consistently distinguishable from each other. Variations in the skulls was attributed to several factors, not only species-level differences but also ontogeny and sexual dimorphism, with no convincing explanation as to how a feature was determined to differ due to one factor or another.

Osborn designated neotypes (replacement type specimens) for several taxa. Believing the Menodus giganteus holotype to have been lost, he proposed the skull AMNH 505 as a neotype for this species. AMNH 505 notably preserves no material that overlaps with the Menodus giganteus type specimen USNM 21820, instead having been selected since the upper dentition "appears to fit very well with the lower teeth of the type", based on a "carefully made model, based on Leidy's figures and measurements of the lower jaw". Osborn reviewed Menodus giganteus as a taxon based on AMNH 505. Osborn also proposed neotypes for Menodus (Titanotherium) proutii, Brontotherium (Symborodon) hypoceras, and Brontotherium (Menodus) platyceras. Osborn's proposals for neotypes were never acted upon by the ICZN and they thus have no official taxonomic status. The existence of original type specimens, such as USNM 21820, undermines the need for neotypes.

Osborn's taxonomy is presented in the table below, alongside the defining features of each subfamily and genus.

Subfamilies	Genera	Species
Brontopinae "Progressive brachycephalic, with short-crowned teeth and moderately short feet; horns short, sub-oval; incisor teeth persistent, rounded crowns, one of two pair, premolars with retarded tetartocones."	Brontops Marsh, 1887; One or two pairs of lower incisors	B.? angustigenis (Cope, 1886); B. brachycephalus (Osborn, 1902); B. dispar Marsh, 1887; B. robustus Marsh, 1887 (type species)
Brontopinae "Progressive brachycephalic, with short-crowned teeth and moderately short feet; horns short, sub-oval; incisor teeth persistent, rounded crowns, one of two pair, premolars with retarded tetartocones."	Diploclonus Marsh, 1890; Internal, branching horns	D. amplus Marsh, 1890 (type species); D.? bicornutus (Osborn, 1902); D. selwynianus (Cope, 1889); D.? tyleri (Lull, 1905)
Brontopinae "Progressive brachycephalic, with short-crowned teeth and moderately short feet; horns short, sub-oval; incisor teeth persistent, rounded crowns, one of two pair, premolars with retarded tetartocones."	Teleodus Marsh, 1890; Three pairs of lower incisors	T. avus Marsh, 1890 (type species); T. primitivus (Lambe, 1908)
Brontotheriinae "Primitively dolichocephalic, progressively mesaticephalic and brachycephalic, slightly cyptocephalic; broad-lipped; very precocious development of the horns; accelerated development of internal cones of superior premolars; prominent cingulate incisor teeth in males."	Brontotherium Marsh, 1873; Progessively elongate horns, nasal abbreviate	B. curtus (Marsh, 1887); B. dolichoceras (Scott & Osborn, 1887); B. gigas Marsh, 1873 (type species); B. hatcheri Osborn, 1908; B. hypoceras (Cope, 1874); B. leidyi Osborn, 1902; B. medius (Marsh, 1891); B. platyceras (Scott & Osborn, 1887); B. ramosum (Osborn, 1896); B.? rumelicus (Toula, 1892); B. tichoceras (Scott & Osborn, 1887)
Megaceropinae "Horns precociously evolved, with little or no connecting crest; head mesaticephalic to brachycephalic, cyptocephalic; narrow-lipped; premolars with precocious tetartocones; grinding teeth without cingulum; vestigal incisor teeth."	Megacerops Leidy, 1870; Rounded and erect horns	M. acer (Cope, 1873); M. assiniboiensis Lambe, 1908; M. bucco (Cope, 1873); M. coloradensis Leidy, 1870 (type species); M. copei (Osborn, 1908); M. riggsi Osborn, 1916; M.? syceras (Cope, 1889)
Menodontinae "Heads of medium width, progressively elongating (Menodus) or broadening (Allops); horns short, trihedral in section; incisor teeth vestigal; grinding teeth long-crowned with prominent cingula; premolars with accelerated tetartocones."	Allops Marsh, 1887; Broadening head	A. crassicornis Marsh, 1891; A. marshi (Osborn, 1902); A. serotinus Marsh, 1887 (type species); A. walcotti Osborn, 1916
Menodontinae "Heads of medium width, progressively elongating (Menodus) or broadening (Allops); horns short, trihedral in section; incisor teeth vestigal; grinding teeth long-crowned with prominent cingula; premolars with accelerated tetartocones."	Menodus Pomel, 1849; Elongating head	M. giganteus Pomel, 1849 (type species); M. heloceras (Cope, 1873); M. proutii (Owen, Norwood & Evans, 1850); M. torvus (Cope, 1873); M. trigonoceras (Cope, 1873); M. varians (Marsh, 1887)

== Post-Osborn developments ==
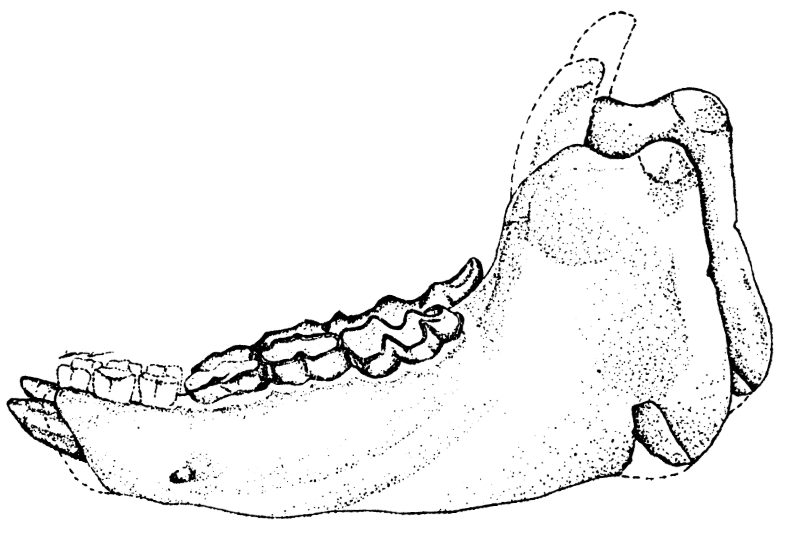
Type specimen of Menodus bakeri, a lower jaw

New Chadronian brontothere species continued to be recognized over the course of the 20th century. Loris Shano Russell described three new brontothere species in 1934: Menodus cutleri, Brontops canadensis, and Menodus lambei. Russell also upheld Osborn's reclassification of Megacerops primitivus as Teleodus primitivus.

Olof August Peterson described a new species of Teleodus in 1931, T. uintensis, from the Duchesne River Formation in Utah. These fossils were Duchesnean in age, the land mammal age that preceded the Chadronian, and their classification in the otherwise Chadronian Teleodus was mainly justified by the presence of six lower incisors. T. uintensis lower jaws described by Peterson were associated with upper jaws that had four incisors, and later fossils assigned to Teleodus were largely classified as such through cranial and dental characteristics shared with the T. uintensis specimens. In 1935, Chester Stock named the new Teleodus species T. californicus from the Duchesnean Sespe Formation in California, and in 1967, Philip R. Bjork named the species T. thyboi from the Duchesnean Slim Buttes Formation in South Dakota.

In 1935, Erich Maren Schlaikjer named a new brontothere genus and species, Ateleodon osborni, based on two partial lower jaws, from an adult and a young specimen. Both fossils were collected by Schlaikjer himself in 1931, in the Yoder Formation in Goshen County, Wyoming, and were presumed to be Chadronian in age. Schlaikjer erected the new genus since the animals apparently either had greatly reduced lower canines and incisors, or were entirely missing these teeth, a feature not seen in any other brontothere. Schlaikjer found no evidence that the lack of canines and incisors in the fossils was due to erosion, old age, or some pathological condition.

There was no immediate attempt to revise Osborn's taxonomy but even his contemporaries criticized it as unrealistic. In a 1941 review of Chadronian brontotheres, William Berryman Scott wrote that "... it is hardly worthwhile even to list the species; that 37 species could not have co-existed within the relatively brief space of the Chadron, is obvious; how many did exist and what names should be given to them, are insoluable problems". Scott also stated that "the probably great effects of sex and age and fluctuating variability have not been sufficiently evaluated". In his 1945 The Principles of Classification and A Classification of Mammals, George Gaylord Simpson used a different subfamily division than Osborn, and accepted five Chadronian brontothere genera as valid: Brontops (=Diploclonus), Teleodus, Menodus (=Titanotherium, Symborodon, Allops), Megacerops, and Brontotherium.

In 1948, J. Willis Stovall described a new brontothere species, Menodus bakeri, based on a lower jaw, several vertebrae and ribs, a near-complete femur, and toe and foot bones found in the Vieja area of Texas, in the Chambers Tuff Formation. Stovall assigned the species to Menodus due to its perceived close agreement to that genus. In particular, Stovall highlighted that the M1 to M3 tooth series measured 192 millimeters, "well within the Menodus range". The canines of M. bakeri were noted to project forward, a feature Stovall interpreted as unique when compared to other brontotheres. Stovall may have intended to name a second species based on a juvenile maxilla, which he mistakenly identified as from an adult. In the text, Stovall described this fossil as from an "unidentified titanothere" but in some of his plates he used the name Microdonta bendi. Since it was not formally described, Microdonta bendi has been deemed a nomen nudum by later researchers.

== 20th-century proposed taxonomic revisions ==
=== Proposed revision by Clark, Beerbower, and Kietzke ===
In 1967, John Clark, James R. Beerbower and Kenneth K. Kietzke were the first to suggest that nearly all Chadronian brontotheres belonged to a single species that exhibited great individual variation. Clark, Beerbower, and Kietzke used the oldest available name, Menodus giganteus, and designated the genera Titanotherium, Megacerops, Brontotherium, Symborodon, Brontops, Diploclonus, and Allops as synonyms of Menodus. Teleodus was the only genus recognized as distinct due to its perceived unique arrangement of six lower incisors. The Menodus giganteus type specimen USNM 21820 does not preserve the incisors and thus has no features distinguishing it from the Teleodus holotype, which was noted to complicate the taxonomy. Clark, Beerbower, and Kietzke followed Osborn's designation of AMNH 505 (which preserves the incisors) as the neotype specimen of M. giganteus, and repeated the mistaken claim that USNM 21820 had been lost.

There being just a single species was based on four fossils collected from a single layer, one foot thick, and within thirty feet of each other. These fossils exhibited great variation in horn development, previously interpreted as a trait differentiating species, but were clearly from a single and contemporary population of animals. Clark, Beerbower, and Kietzke thus proposed that the differences in horns seen in the Chadronian brontothere fossil record was a result of individual variation and sexual dimorphism. They noted that it was possible that there were different species, with different ranges of horn variation, but that this was impossible to determine due to the lack of large series of specimens with detailed stratigraphic data.

Clark, Beerbower, and Kietzke listed the following diagnostic characters for Menodus and Teleodus:

Menodus	Teleodus
0–4 lower incisors	6 lower incisors
Horns small to large, subconical to cylindrical or flat in longitudinal section	Horns small, subconical in longitudinal section
Top of skull always concave upward	Boss on top of male skulls

=== Description of Duchesneodus ===
In 1982, Spencer G. Lucas and Robert M. Schoch reexamined the type specimen of Teleodus avus (YPM 10321), and concluded that the specimen did not come from the same genus as all other fossils later assigned to Teleodus, "a serious and surprising taxonomic error". Spencer and Lucas erected the new genus Duchesneodus to contain all fossils assigned to Teleodus other than the T. avus type specimen. The best-represented species, T. uintensis, was designated as the type species, as Duchesneodus uintensis. T. primitivus, T. californicus, and T. thyboi were all also assigned to Duchesneodus. The assignment of these fossils to a new genus ended the previous conception of Teleodus as a genus that lived during both the Duchesnean and Chadronian land mammal ages, restricting Teleodus to the Chadronian and Duchesneodus to the Duchesnean.

Lucas and Schoch rejected Clark, Beerbower, and Kietzke's revision of Chadronian brontotheres to just Menodus and Teleodus, since this had not been "substantiated by a thorough taxonomic revision", and further noted that no such revision had taken place since Osborn's monograph in 1929. Lucas and Schoch instead continued to use Megacerops, Brontotherium, and Brontops as provisionally valid genera.

Lucas and Schoch determined that the only feature of YPM 10321 that separated it from other Chadronian brontothere jaws were the six lower incisors, and that the fossil otherwise fell within the range of variation of Brontops and Brontotherium. YPM 10321 is the only Chadronian brontothere jaw ever found with six lower incisors. The incisors were furthermore only feature that justified the assignment of species such as T. primitivus and T. uintensis to Teleodus. Examination of the specimen showed that the incisors were all tightly crowded in a straight line anterior to the canines, unlike in other brontotheres. Radiographs showed only the roots of the four central incisors extending into the mandible, with the condition unclear in the outermost two. Lucas and Schoch suggested that Teleodus was a synonym of Brontops or Brontotherium, and that the two outermost lower incisors were either a forgery, added to the fossil by Stilwell or an assistant, or perhaps retained deciduous incisors. In 2004, Lucas reviewed 20th-century correspondence between Marsh and Stilwell and concluded that the T. avus holotype was a hoax, Stilwell having added additional incisors to the fossil to drive up its price and convince Marsh to purchase it.

=== Proposed revision by Mader, description of Megacerops kuwagatarhinus ===
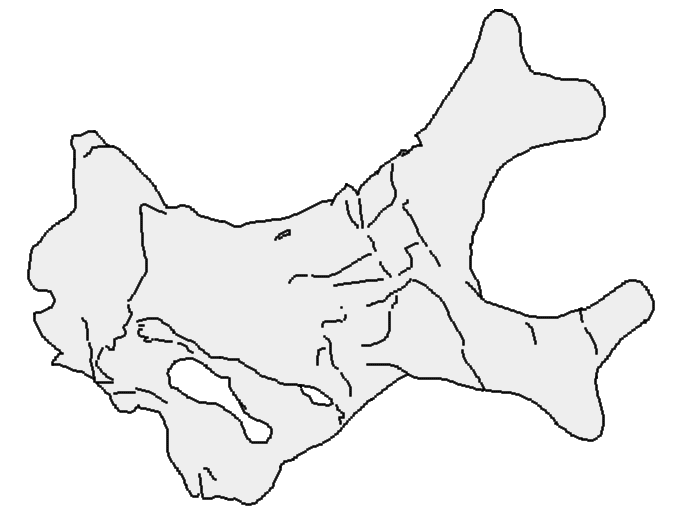
Illustration of F:AM 128600, the holotype specimen of Megacerops kuwagatarhinus, a partial skull

In 1989, Bryn J. Mader published a revised taxonomy of Chadronian brontotheres in Donald Prothero and Robert M. Schoch's The Evolution of Perissodactyls. Mader recognized Brontops, Megacerops, and Menops as valid genera, mostly differentiated by the cross-sectional shape of the horns. The name Menodus was not used since the holotype of Menodus giganteus does not preserve the horns, and thus no genus-level distinguishing features per Mader's taxonomy. Lucas and Schoch's 1982 conclusions regarding Teleodus were accepted by Mader, with Duchesneodus recognized as a valid new genus.

In 1995, Mader and John P. Alexander named a new Chadronian brontothere species, Megacerops kuwagatarhinus, based on fossil skulls with bifurcating horns. The species name was derived from kuwagata, the stylized antlers on Japanese kabuto, and the Latinized Greek rhinus ("nose"). The holotype specimen, F:AM 128600, is a partial skull found on the east side of Capitol Rock in Custer National Forest, Montana. Additional specimens were also referred to the species from Saskatchewan, Canada. M. kuwagatarhinus was referred to Megacerops on the grounds of its resemblance to the diagnosis of that genus by Mader in 1989. Mader and Alexander noted that "a species-level revision of the genus Megacerops and of Chadronian brontotheres in general is still necessary, but is beyond the scope of the present paper."

A slightly revised version of Mader's taxonomy was published in Christine Janis, Kathleen M. Scott, and Louis L. Jacobs's Evolution of Tertiary Mammals of North America (1998). The 1998 version, reproduced in the table below, considered 18 species to be valid, placed in three genera:

Genus	Brontops	Megacerops	Menops
Genus synonyms	Diploclonus	Brontotherium, Titanops	Allops, Menodus
Type species	B. robustus	M. coloradensis	M. varians
Type specimen	YPM 12048, skull and skeleton	ANSP 13362, horns and nasals	YPM 12060, skull
Included species	7 species: B. robustus; B. amplus; B. bicornutus; B. brachycephalus; B. dispar (=B. validus); B. selwynianus; B. tyleri	4 species: M. coloradensis; M. curtus; M. kuwagatarhinus; M. platyceras	7 species: M. varians; M. crassicornis; M. heloceras; M. marshi; M. serotinus; M. trigonoceras; M. walcotti
Characteristics	Very large; Four or fewer upper and lower incisors; Incisors reduced and globular in shape; No diastema; Partially molarized premolars; Hypocone on M3; Massive zygomatic arches that are thickened/swelled posteriorly; Short, anteriorly directed horns that are round to elliptical in cross-section; Wide and saddle-shaped cranial vertex; Average M2 length: 59–80 mm	Large to very large; Four or fewer upper and lower incisors; Incisors reduced and globular in shape; Reduced canine; No diastema; Partially molarized premolars; Hypocone on M3; Broadly expanded and wing-shaped zygomatic arches; Long horns, directed laterally or forward, that are roughly circular to elliptical in cross-section; Wide and saddle-shaped cranial vertex; Average M2 length: 62.5–84.5 mm	Very large; Four or fewer upper and lower incisors; Incisors reduced and globular in shape; Reduced canine; No diastema; Partially molarized premolars; Hypocone on M3; Massive zygomatic arches, not thickened or expanded laterally; Relatively large horns, laterally directed, that are strongly trihedral in cross-section; Wide and saddle-shaped cranial vertex; Average M2 length: 67.5–100 mm

Mader's taxonomy was not universally accepted by other paleontologists. In 1997, Malcolm McKenna and Susan K. Bell recognized five genera, with the arrangement and synonymizations slightly differing from Mader's version. In Classification of Mammals: Above the Species Level, McKenna and Bell recognized Ateleodon, Brontops (=Diploclonus, Teleodus), Brontotherium, Megacerops, and Menodus (=Titanotherium, Symborodon, Anisacodon, Diconodon, Allops).

== 21st-century developments ==
=== Preliminary revision by Mihlbachler, Lucas, and Emry ===
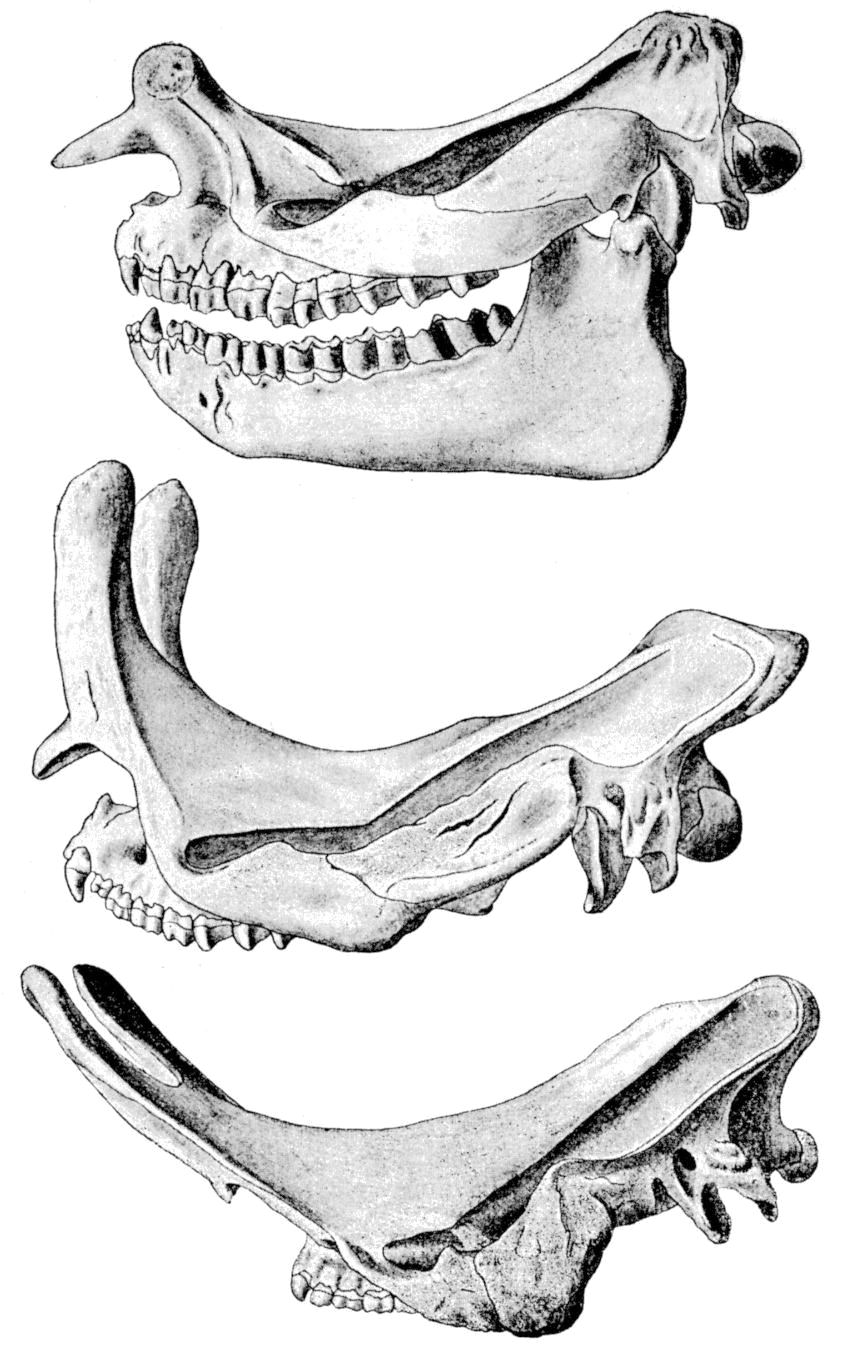
Three Chadronian brontothere skulls, showing great differences in the horns, nasal bones, and zygomatic arches. Osborn (1929) classified these skulls as (top to bottom) Menodus trigonoceras, Brontotherium gigas, and Brontotherium platyceras. Per Mihlbachler, Lucas & Emry (2004), all three are skulls of Megacerops coloradensis.

In 2004, Matthew C. Mihlbachler, Spencer G. Lucas and Robert J. Emry published a preliminary revision of the Chadronian brontotheres. They rejected Mader's taxonomy, stating that the use of horn shape and zygomatic shape as genus-level features was "entirely conjectural", and noted that Mader had done no morphometric analysis to show that these traits could be used to group fossils into actually diagnosable and discrete taxa, nor was the use of the features supported via phylogenetic analysis.

Using data from a large number of specimens, from most of the major North American collections, some traits among the fossils were found to be highly variable. In most mammal species, the coefficients of variation of specific features is at most 10. In the Chadronian brontothere fossils, the length and circumference of the horns, and the thickness of the zygomatic arches, yielded coefficients of variation of between 30 and 63. The lengths of the rows of molars in the upper and lower jaws yielded much lower coefficients of 11.4 and 13.4, respectively. This pattern is similar to some sexually dimorphic mammals. The Miocene rhinoceros Menoceras arikarense exhibits a coefficient of variation for features of the horns and nasal bones of 51.3, but has a coefficient below 10 for features that are not sexually dimorphic, such as the length of the tooth rows. Although the variation in the brontotheres is higher than what is generally acceptable even for a sexually dimorphic species, Mihlbachler, Lucas, and Emry noted that the data is continuous, with no objective means to divide the fossils into discrete morphological units.

Objective division being impossible, Mihlbachler, Lucas, and Emry considered the possibility of only one diagnosable Chadronian brontothere species. If only a single species is recognized, Menodus giganteus would as the earliest available name be the valid name. Megacerops kuwagatarhinus was suggested to be a distinct species, since the bifurcating horns clearly separate it from the majority of fossils, which have non-bifurcating horns. The M. kuwagatarhinus holotype skull also preserves a molar (M3) with several traits not seen in any other skull, such as an unusually brachydont (unusually low) ectoloph, a large metaconule and a small paraconule (metaconules and paraconules are two of the cusps of the teeth). Although it is difficult to establish whether M. kuwagatarhinus was a separate breeding population or simply rare variants of the more common species, Mihlbachler, Lucas, and Emry chose to provisionally recognize it as distinct. They thus proposed that Chadronian brontotheres compose just two discretely diagnosable species, differentiated by whether the horns are bifurcating or not. Since the Menodus giganteus holotype preserves no overlapping material with the M. kuwagatarhinus fossils, and does not preserve the horns (the most important diagnostic feature), that name was designated as a nomen dubium. Megacerops coloradensis was determined to be the valid name for the common species with non-bifurcating horns, since the M. coloradensis holotype is the first type specimen to preserve horns, and thus unambiguously belong to this species.

=== Later developments ===
Mader rejected Mihlbachler, Lucas, and Emry's revision, continuing to support his own three-genus model. Mader criticized the proposed synonymizations in 2008 and continued to use Brontops, Megacerops, and Menops as genera in 2009. In 2008, Mihlbachler again criticized Mader's methodology, noting that Mader had performed no species-level revision of the fossils, and that Mader had not performed a phylogenetic analysis to determine whether Brontops, Megacerops, and Menops were monophyletic. Later in 2008, Mihlbachler again noted that the parts of the cranial anatomy used by Mader to split the fossils into three genera are entirely continuous among the fossils, making it impossible to split them into the discrete units proposed by Mader.

In 2008, Mihlbachler published a major revision of Brontotheriidae. Megacerops was excluded from the revision but Mihlbachler upheld the conclusions of the 2004 paper in regard to the genus. Per the 2008 paper, the Chadronian brontothere material represents no more than a few sexually dimorphic species, all belonging to a single genus (Megacerops), of which at least two species are diagnosable, M. coloradensis and M. kuwagatarhinus, differentiated mainly by whether the horns are bifurcating (M. kuwagatarhinus) or not (M. coloradensis). Mihlbachler considered all other named Chadronian brontothere taxa to either be nomina dubia or synonyms of those two species. Megacerops as used by Mihlbachler was recovered as monophyletic in a phylogenetic analysis. The 2008 revision also concluded that only one species of Duchesneodus was valid, D. uintensis. The other three Duchesneodus species (D. primitivus, D. californicus, and D. thyboi) were all designated as nomina dubia, determined to be based on nondiagnostic fossils.

In Volume 2 of Evolution of Tertiary Mammals of North America (2008), Christine Janis, Richard C. Hulbert Jr., and Mihlbachler noted that Brontops and Menops were "probably congeneric" with Megacerops. Mihlbachler concluded that Chadronian brontotheres whose holotypes lack preserved horns are all nomina dubia (since this feature separates coloradensis and kuwagatarhinus), and that those that preserve non-bifurcating horns should be seen as synonyms of M. coloradensis, unless a formal revision shows otherwise. Mihlbachler (2008) noted that an actual species-level taxonomy of Chadronian brontotheres was still necessary but out of scope for his paper, and that a more comprehensive study of the fossil material could indicate additional species of Megacerops.

In June 2021, Rory E. Sweedler, Jaelyn J. Eberle, and Mihlbachler described a new brontothere jaw (UCM 109045) from a Chadronian locality in the Antero Formation in Colorado. UCM 109045 has a lower number of incisors than the jaws of M. coloradensis, and has a longer postcanine diastema (longer gap between the canines and the other teeth). Based on these features, the jaw was determined to probably belong to a species distinct from M. coloradensis. Morphologically, the jaw was noted as most similar to the early Chadronian Protitanops curryi, known from the southwestern United States, and to the Duchesnean holotype jaw of Megacerops (Duchesneodus) primitivus. Megacerops primitivus was among the species designated as nomen dubia by Mihlbachler in 2008, since its holotype does not preserve the horns. Although no comparison is possible between the fossils, Sweedler, Eberle, and Mihlbachler hypothesized that UCM 109045 could be a lower jaw of M. kuwagatarhinus. Since the jaw might be from the same taxon as M. primitivus (despite M. primitivus's slightly earlier age), they also noted the possibility that M. kuwagatarhinus could be a junior synonym of M. primitivus.

In November 2021, Mihlbachler and Prothero designated Menodus bakeri as a nomen dubium, supporting Mihlbachler's determination of it as such in 2008. Mihlbachler and Prothero noted that the most important distinguishing feature of the holotype, the protruding canine teeth, was of "dubious taxonomic significance", since the fossil is incomplete and it is thus not clear that the canines would have protruded when the animal was alive. The anterior end of the mandible, which included the dental alveoli of the canines, is not preserved. Mihlbachler and Prothero concluded that the jaw was nondiagnostic and that Menodus bakeri was likely to be a synonym of Protitanops curryi, also known from the Chambers Tuff Formation.

== Present status ==
Chadronian brontotheres are among the best represented large mammals in the North American fossil record, known from hundreds of complete skulls and a large number of complete skeletons. The longstanding confusion around the basic systematics of the fossils has historically been an obstacle for research on their evolution and paleobiology, areas that remain understudied. Since 2008, Mihlbachler's proposal that all fossils belong to the single genus Megacerops, which includes at least two diagnosable species, has become widely accepted, also supported by researchers such as Donald Prothero, Karen J. Lloyd, Jaelyn J. Eberle, Parker D. Rhinehart, Alfred J. Mead and Dennis Parmley.

No formal species-level revision of Chadronian brontotheres has yet been conducted and the taxonomy thus formally remains unresolved. In 2021, Mihlbachler and Prothero noted that the true biodiversity among Chadronian brontothere "remains enigmatic". To accurately determine the number of taxa present in the fossil record, a large collection of fossils with field data is required. Detailed stratigraphic data is necessary to determine how brontotheres changed within the three million years of the Chadronian, and several associated specimens (i.e. individuals from the same sites) are needed to determine the variability of features within single populations. Many of the Chadronian brontothere fossils examined historically have poor or wrong stratigraphic data, limiting their scientific usefulness. In 2009, Prothero noted that a good collection of brontothere fossils with stratigraphic data, collected in the 1940s and 1950s, is kept at the American Museum of Natural History (AMNH). Most of the AMNH collection is still in plaster jackets from when the fossils were first collected, and interest and funding to properly prepare the fossils has been limited.

== Table of taxonomic names ==
Valid taxon
Synonym
Nondiagnostic/indeterminate
Not treated

Taxon	Authority	Osborn (1929)	Mader (1998)	Mihlbachler (2008)	Notes
Menodus giganteus	Pomel, 1849	Menodus giganteus	Not mentioned	Nomen dubium	
Palaeotherium? proutii (Titanotherium proutii)	Owen, Norwood & Evans, 1850	Menodus proutii	Not mentioned	Nomen dubium	Moved to new genus Titanotherium by Leidy, 1852
Palaeotherium maximum	Leidy, 1852	Indeterminate	Not mentioned	Nomen dubium	
Rhinoceros americanus (Eotherium americanum)	Leidy, 1852	Indeterminate	Not mentioned	Nomen dubium	Moved to new genus Eotherium by Leidy, 1853 (as Eotherium americanum)
Palaeotherium giganteum	Leidy, 1854	Indeterminate	Not mentioned	Nomen dubium	
Leidyotherium	Prout, 1860	Indeterminate	Not mentioned	Nomen dubium	No species designated
Megacerops coloradensis	Leidy, 1870	Megacerops coloradensis	Megacerops coloradensis	Megacerops coloradensis	
Titanotherium? anceps	Marsh, 1871	Not mentioned	Not mentioned	Not mentioned	Not a brontothere; moved to new (valid) dinoceratan genus Uintatherium by Leidy, 1872
Brontotherium gigas	Marsh, 1873	Brontotherium gigas	Not mentioned	Nomen dubium	
Symborodon torvus	Cope, 1873	Menodus torvus	Not mentioned	Nomen dubium	
Miobasileus ophryas	Cope, 1873	Indeterminate	Not mentioned	Nomen nudum	
Megaceratops acer	Cope, 1873	Megacerops acer	Not mentioned	=Megacerops coloradensis	
Megaceratops heloceras	Cope, 1873	Menodus heloceras	Menops heloceras	=Megacerops coloradensis	
Symborodon bucco	Cope, 1873	Megacerops bucco	Not mentioned	=Megacerops coloradensis	
Symborodon altirostris	Cope, 1873	=Megacerops acer	Not mentioned	=Megacerops coloradensis	
Symborodon trigonoceras	Cope, 1873	Menodus trigonoceras	Menops trigonoceras	=Megacerops coloradensis	
Brontotherium ingens	Marsh, 1873	=Menodus giganteus	Not mentioned	=Megacerops coloradensis	
Symborodon hypoceras	Cope, 1874	Brontotherium hypoceras	Not mentioned	=Megacerops coloradensis	
Anisacodon montanus (Diconodon montanus)	Marsh, 1875	=Menodus giganteus?	Not mentioned	Nomen dubium	Moved to new genus Diconodon by Marsh, 1876 (Anisacodon preoccupied)
Menodus angustigenis (Haplacodon angustigenis)	Cope, 1886	Assessment unclear (Note: M. angustigenis is not listed in Osborn's list of valid species. The taxon's entry in Osborn's list of descriptions indicate it as a provisionally valid species of Megacerops, to be treated on page 482 of the monograph. The taxon is mention on page 482, but does not have its own entry there as expected of a taxon treated as valid.)	Not mentioned	Nomen dubium	Moved to new genus Haplacodon by Cope, 1889
Menodus tichoceras	Scott & Osborn, 1887	Brontotherium tichoceras	Not mentioned	Nomen dubium	
Menodus dolichoceras	Scott & Osborn, 1887	Brontotherium dolichoceras	Not mentioned	=Megacerops coloradensis	
Menodus platyceras	Scott & Osborn, 1887	Brontotherium platyceras	Megacerops platyceras	=Megacerops coloradensis	
Brontops robustus	Marsh, 1887	Brontops robustus	Brontops robustus	=Megacerops coloradensis	
Brontops dispar	Marsh, 1887	Brontops dispar	Brontops dispar	Nomen dubium	
Menops varians	Marsh, 1887	Menodus varians	Menops varians	=Megacerops coloradensis	
Titanops curtus	Marsh, 1887	Brontotherium curtum	Megacerops curtus	=Megacerops coloradensis	
Titanops elatus	Marsh, 1887	=Brontotherium gigas	Not mentioned	=Megacerops coloradensis	
Allops serotinus	Marsh, 1887	Allops serotinus	Menops serotinus	=Megacerops coloradensis	
Menodus selwynianus	Cope, 1889	Diploclonus selwynianus	Brontops selwynianus	Nomen dubium	
Menodus syceras	Cope, 1889	Megacerops? syceras	Not mentioned	=Megacerops coloradensis	
Diploclonus amplus	Marsh, 1890	Diploclonus amplus	Brontops amplus	=Megacerops coloradensis	
Teleodus avus	Marsh, 1890	Teleodus avus	Not mentioned	Nomen dubium	Type specimen is a paleontological hoax
Allops crassicornis	Marsh, 1891	Allops crassicornis	Menops crassicornis	=Megacerops coloradensis	
Brontops validus	Marsh, 1891	=Brontops dispar	=Brontops dispar	=Megacerops coloradensis	
Titanops medius	Marsh, 1891	Brontotherium medium	Not mentioned	=Megacerops coloradensis	
Menodus peltoceras	Cope, 1891	=cf. Brontotherium curtum / Indeterminate	Not mentioned	=Megacerops coloradensis	
Menodus? rumelicus	Toula, 1892	Brontotherium? rumelicum	Not mentioned	Not mentioned	European
Titanotherium ramosum	Osborn, 1896	Brontotherium ramosum	Not mentioned	=Megacerops coloradensis	
Megacerops brachycephalus	Osborn, 1902	Brontops brachycephalus	Not mentioned	=Megacerops coloradensis	
Megacerops bicornutus	Osborn, 1902	Diploclonus? bicornutus	Brontops bicornutus	=Megacerops coloradensis	
Megacerops marshi	Osborn, 1902	Allops marshi	Menops marshi	=Megacerops coloradensis	
Brontotherium leidyi	Osborn, 1902	Brontotherium leidyi	Not mentioned	=Megacerops coloradensis	
Megacerops tyleri	Lull, 1905	Diploclonus? tyleri	Brontops tyleri	=Megacerops coloradensis	
Brontotherium hatcheri	Osborn, 1908	Brontotherium hatcheri	Not mentioned	=Megacerops coloradensis	
Symborodon copei	Osborn, 1908	Megacerops copei	Not mentioned	=Megacerops coloradensis	
Megacerops primitivus	Lambe, 1908	Teleodus primitivus	Duchesneodus primitivus	Nomen dubium (Note: Mihlbachler considered the type specimen of Megacerops primitivus to be non-diagnostic, possibly belonging to Duchesneodus uintensis, Protitanops curryi, or Notiotitanops mississippiensis.)	Duchesnean in age
Megacerops assiniboiensis	Lambe, 1908	Megacerops assiniboiensis	Not mentioned	Nomen dubium	
Titanotherium bohemicum	Kiernik, 1913	=Menodus giganteus	Not mentioned	Not mentioned	European
Allops walcotti	Osborn, 1916	Allops walcotti	Menops walcotti	=Megacerops coloradensis	
Megacerops riggsi	Osborn, 1916	Megacerops riggsi	Not mentioned	Nomen dubium	
Brontops gobiensis	Osborn, 1925	Not mentioned	Not mentioned	Parabrontops gobiensis	Asian. Moved to new (valid) genus Parabrontops by Granger and Gregory, 1943.
Menodus mongoliensis	Osborn, 1925	Not mentioned	Not mentioned	Not mentioned	Asian. Based on a single isolated tooth likely belonging to Embolotherium or Titanodectes.
Teleodus uintensis	Peterson, 1931	Not yet described	Duchesneodus uintensis	Duchesneodus uintensis	Duchesnean in age. Moved to new (valid) genus Duchesneodus by Lucas & Schoch, 1982.
Menodus cutleri	Russell, 1934	Not yet described	Not mentioned	=Megacerops coloradensis	
Brontops canadensis	Russell, 1934	Not yet described	Not mentioned	Nomen dubium	
Menodus lambei	Russell, 1934	Not yet described	Not mentioned	Nomen dubium	
Ateleodon osborni	Schlaikjer, 1935	Not yet described	Not mentioned	Nomen dubium	
Teleodus californicus	Stock, 1935	Not yet described	Not mentioned	Nomen dubium (Note: Mihlbachler considered the type specimen of Teleodus californicus to be non-diagnostic, possibly belonging to Protitanops curryi or Notiotitanops mississippiensis.)	Duchesnean in age
Menodus bakeri	Stovall, 1948	Not yet described	Not mentioned	Nomen dubium	Likely a synonym of Protitanops curryi
Teleodus thyboi	Bjork, 1967	Not yet described	Not mentioned	Nomen dubium (Note: Mihlbachler considered the type specimen of Teleodus thyboi to be non-diagnostic, possibly belonging to Eubrontotherium clarnoensis, Protitanops curryi, or Notiotitanops mississippiensis.)	Duchesnean in age
Megacerops kuwagatarhinus	Mader & Alexander, 1995	Not yet described	Megacerops kuwagatarhinus	Megacerops kuwagatarhinus	

== See also ==
- Lumpers and splitters
