= Cottin =

Cottin is a surname. Notable people with the surname include:

- Alfred Cottin (1863–1923), guitarist, composer and author
- Camille Cottin (born 1978), French actress
- Cyrille Cottin II (1870–1942), French industrialist and racing driver
- Émile Cottin (1896–1936), French anarchist and attempted assassin
- Jacques Cottin, French costume designer
- Jules Cottin (1868–1922), mandolinist, composer and author
- Sophie Ristaud Cottin (1770–1807), French writer
- Letty Cottin Pogrebin (born 1939), American feminist writer and journalist

== Other ==
- Cottin & Desgouttes, French automobile manufacturer from the beginning of the 20th century
