= Cornelius Tiebout =

American copperplate engraver

Cornelius Tiebout (1773?-1832) was an American copperplate engraver. According to the Library of Congress and many followers, Tiebout was born about 1773. If so, his earliest known engraving was published while he was about fifteen years old.

== Biography ==
Tiebout was born to a Dutch Huguenot family, probably in New York. He was apprenticed to New York silversmith John Burger (1747-1828). Tiebout and Burger's son published (probably in 1789) a songbook entitled Amphion.

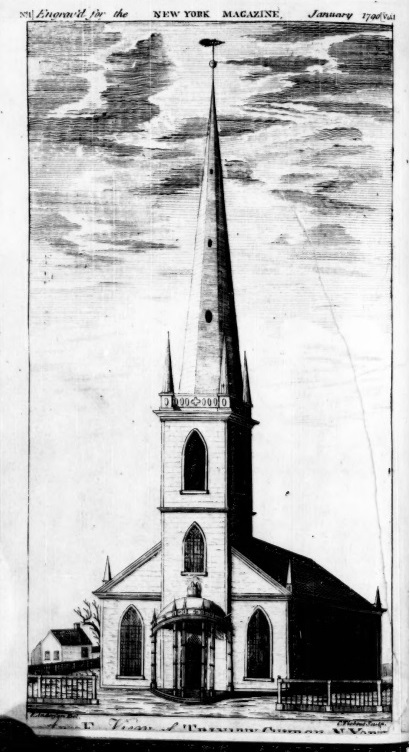
Trinity Church, New York City

Among young Tiebout's many engravings during 1790-1793 are 47 illustrations in The New York Magazine; or, Literary Repository. His engraving of Trinity Church, New York City, appears in the first issue of this magazine, dated the first day of 1790. Each issue of the Magazine that includes a Tiebout engraving also presents, on the contents page, an announcement about the engraving. The accompanying articles provide details of historic interest. Among the 47 subjects are the Federal Edifice in New York City (March, 1790; now Federal Hall), Columbia College (May, 1790, now Columbia University)), Mount Aetna, (November, 1790, now Mount Etna, in Sicily), West Point (March, 1791, now United States Military Academy), Plan of the City of Washington (June, 1792, Washington, D.C.), and views of rivers, historic residences, and churches. The publication of these engravings in the New York Magazine was of great importance to Tiebout's early career. The publisher, T. and J. Swords, approved of Tiebout's "costly copperplate engravings", and they published a map by Tiebout in issues of the New York City Directory for the years 1789-1793, 1795, and 1796. These directories and other Tiebout engravings can be viewed online from the New York Public Library.

It seems likely that all published maps engraved by Tiebout appeared before he moved from New York to Philadelphia in 1800. These include separate maps of southern states and northern states in 1789. In view of Tiebout's published engravings before 1790, along with other evidence, it is biographically notable that the year 1777—widely published as the year of Tiebout's birth—is less acceptable than the estimate "1773?" given elsewhere. (Another source indicates that Tiebout was born in 1770. His siblings, for whom documentation exists, were born during 1754-1767.)

Tiebout engraved the title page, dated 1789, of Survey of the Roads of the United States of America by Christopher Colles, and possibly he engraved some of the maps in the Survey and taught Colles's daughter Eliza how to do so, leading to recognition of Eliza as the earliest female American engraver.

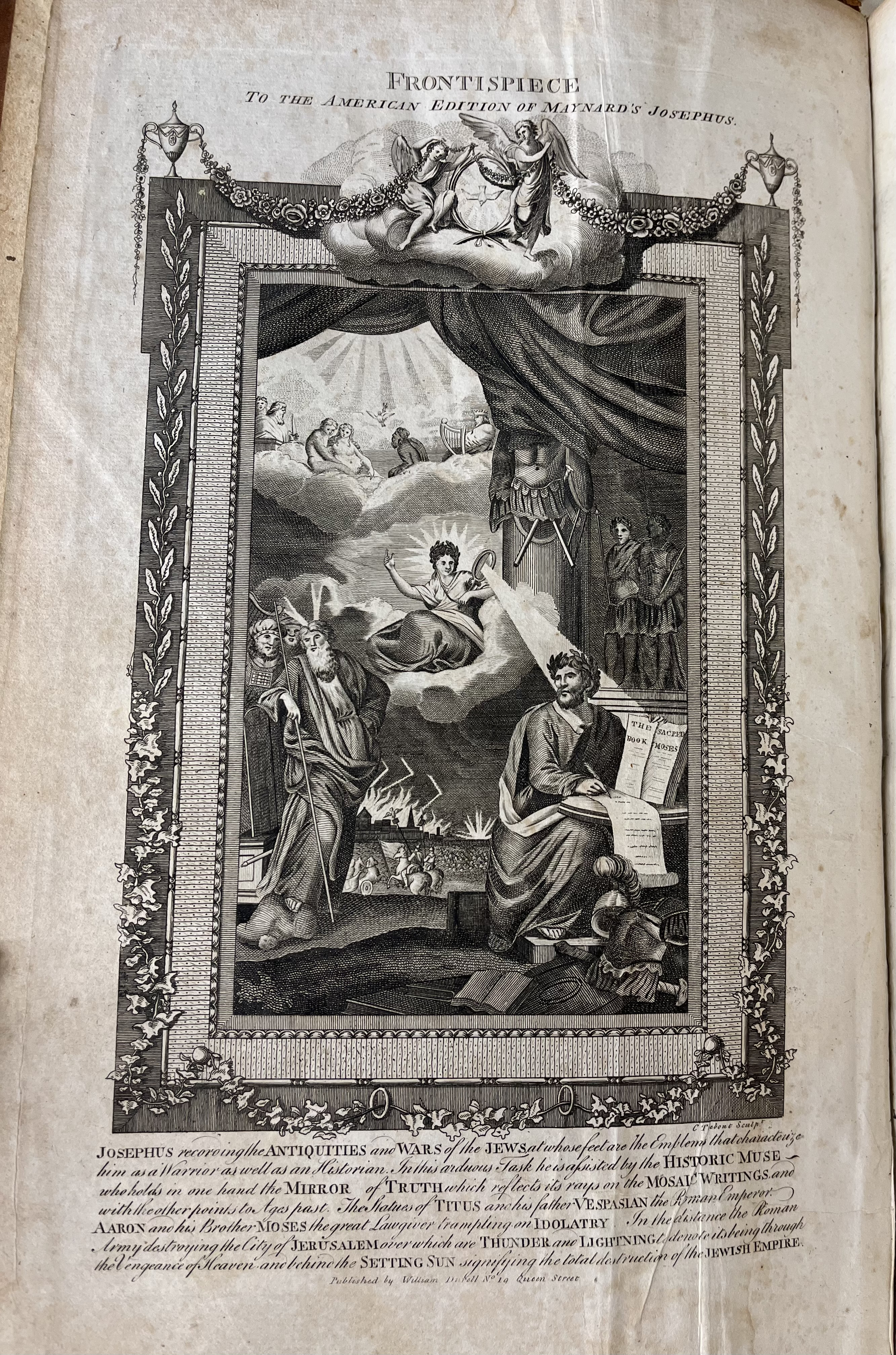
Frontispiece of Works of Josephus engraved by Cornelius Tiebout, 1792, Courtesy of American Antiquarian Society

Another boost for Tiebout's early career was the inclusion of 14 of his engravings in a major publication, the Collected Works of Josephus. The frontispiece of this book was engraved, after English artist Conrad Martin Metz (1749-1827), by Tiebout. According to the caption, the engraving shows the 1st-century Jewish historian Josephus holding a book and writing, "inspired by Historic Muse holding Mirror of Truth in the clouds…".

Late in 1793, Tiebout moved to London. According to Tiebout's daughter Caroline, Tiebout resided in the house of Pennsylvania-born artist Benjamin West during 1793-1796. In London, Tiebout engraved five portraits that were published in London. Referring to Tiebout's London portrait of John Jay, Stauffer wrote, "This is probably the first really good portrait engraved by an American-born professional engraver." Stauffer correctly gives the date of this famous portrait as April, 1795. The date April, 1796, given elsewhere, is an error. In August, 1796, Tiebout returned to New York, and in that year the firm of Cornelius and Alexander Tiebout (not Andrew Tiebout, as found in some sources) published an engraving of a painting by West.

According to many accounts, the purpose of Tiebout's three years in London was to study stipple engraving under James Heath. However, there appears to be no mention of Tiebout in published works about Heath or Tiebout's six London-based engravings. Regarding Tiebout's craftsmanship, Donald O'Brien writes that young Tiebout's work in Josephus is much better than that of the well-established American engraver Amos Doolittle, and that "a cursory examination divulges that Tiebout was a superior craftsman even before studying in London."

The diary of Alexander Anderson provides insights into the lives of his friends Alexander and Cornelius Tiebout. For example, Anderson wrote on 17 October 1794 that he "Stopp't at A. Tiebout's shop and saw 3 engravings done by his brother Cornelius in England." An entry in February 1799 notes that Cornelius was courting Esther Young, daughter of Isaac Young and niece of Thomas Young. Cornelius and Esther were married on 20 April 1799. They named their first child Joseph Young Tiebout after Dr. Joseph Young, another of Esther's uncles.

The year of Tiebout's move from New York to Philadelphia is stated as 1799 in some accounts. It seems likely, however, that the move took place in 1800, as Tiebout sent, from New York, a letter to Mathew Carey, dated 17 December 1799. Genealogical records show that the Tiebouts' son Joseph was baptized on 4 March 1800 in Philadelphia.

Tiebout was among the most active engravers in Philadelphia during his residence there. During 1817-1824, he was a member of the banknote firm of Tanner, Kearney, and Tiebout, located at 10 Library Street, Philadelphia. The firm featured an invention by Henry J. Tanner (brother of engraver Benjamin Tanner), designed to prevent counterfeiting. Tiebout "is said to have made considerable money in his business, but he lost most of it in some disastrous speculation…"

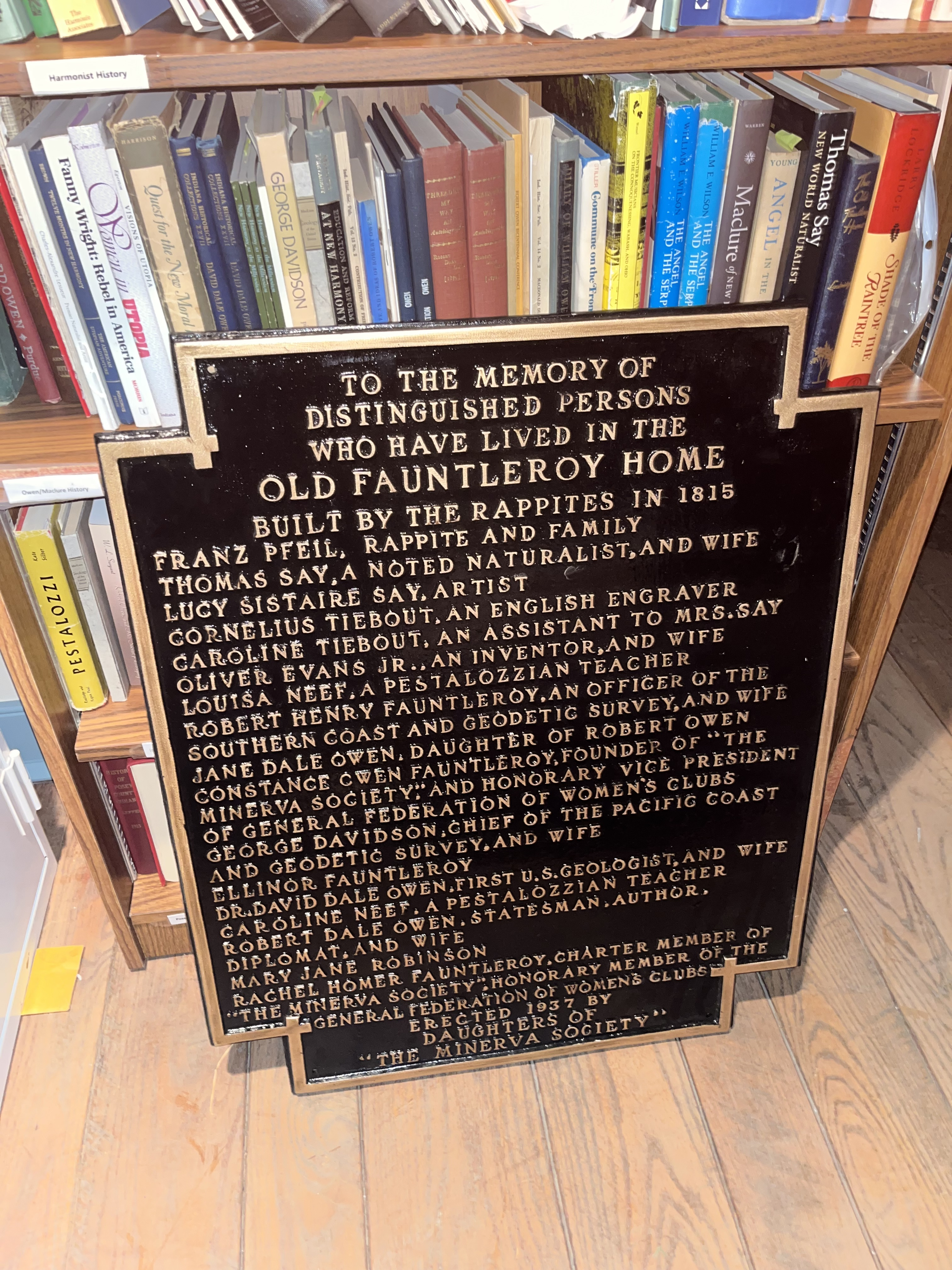
Possibly the Tiebouts and Says resided here at the same time, before it was named the Fauntleroy Home. (Tiebout was of Dutch ancestry, not English.) Courtesy of Indiana State Museum and Historic Sites

It has been widely published that Tiebout moved to Kentucky and died there. Instead, Tiebout, with daughter Caroline, 23, and son Henry, 5, arrived in New Harmony, Indiana, in October, 1826, and resided there until Tiebout's death. In New Harmony, Tiebout taught in William Maclure's School of Industry and engraved illustrations for Thomas Say's American Entomology, a project which he had begun when both he and Say lived in Philadelphia. Tiebout was still engraving illustrations for Say's American Conchology when he became too ill to continue. According to records in The Working Men's Institute in New Harmony, Cornelius Tiebout died on 24 February 1832 and was buried on the property of George Woods in a graveyard that no longer exists. According to a record in the Posey County, Indiana, Courthouse, dated 29 March 1832, Tiebout's son-in-law, Simon W. Kellogg, was administrator of Tiebout's estate, with Thomas Say as co-signer.

== Works ==
Tiebout's works are held in multiple American museum collections, including the Metropolitan Museum of Art, and the Pennsylvania Academy of the Fine Arts, as well as the Royal Collection Trust in the United Kingdom.

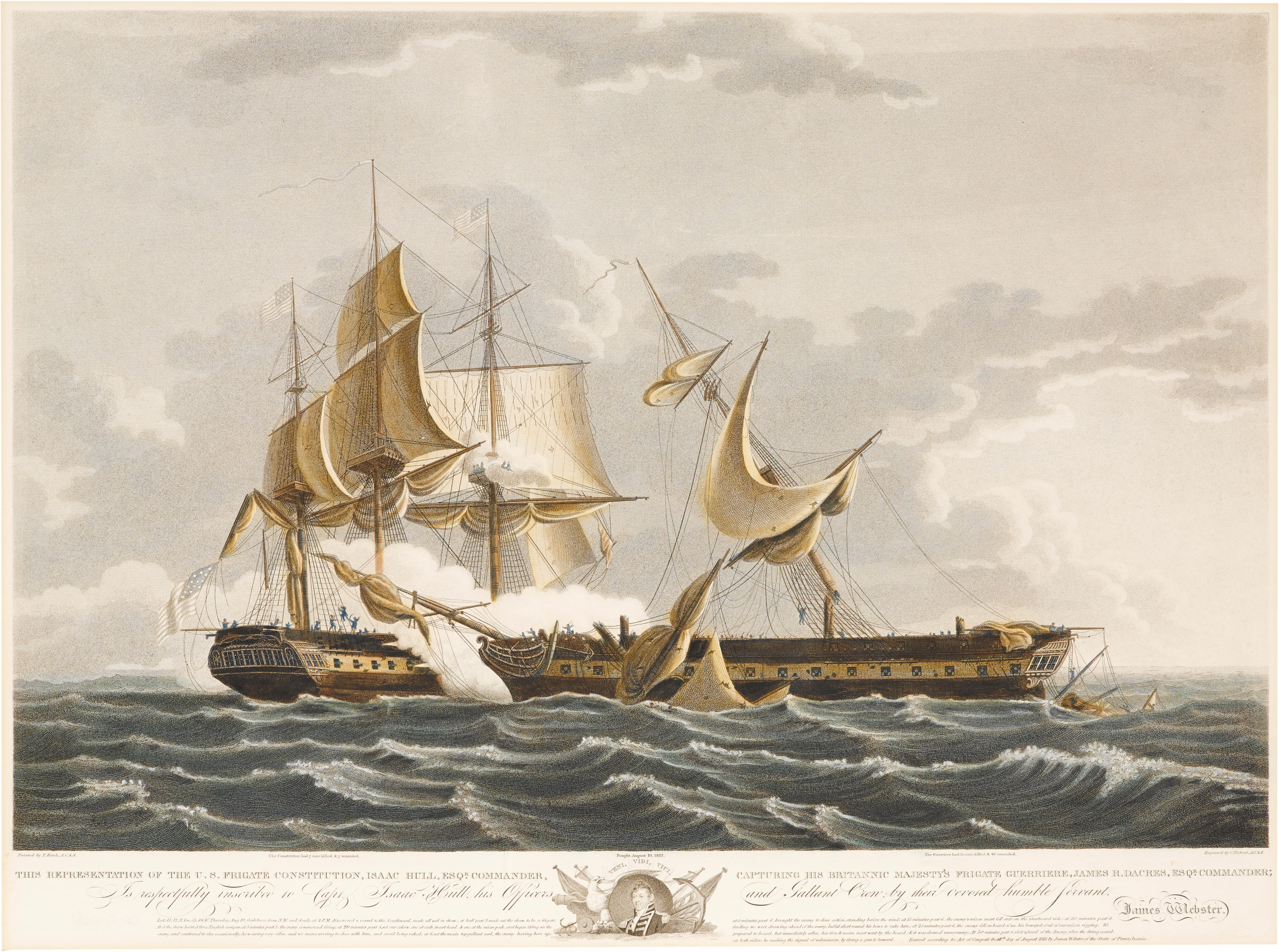
Constitution capturing Guerrier, engraved by Cornelius Tiebout after Thomas Birch, War of 1812

His best-known engravings include portraits of George Washington, Thomas Jefferson, and John Adams, as well as an engraving of the then-New York City Hall, and the USS Constitution capturing the Guerriere. However, as is true about many American copperplate engravers, most of Tiebout's engravings appeared in American editions of books previously published in London during the first three decades after the War for Independence. A selection of these follows.

The Works of Josephus. (mentioned above). The New York 1792 edition followed a London edition published three years earlier. Both editions included 60 engravings. The copper plates used in London were not used in New York. Instead, American engravers made new plates. Most of the London engravings included names of artists, but these were omitted in American editions. Such omissions—in many books—went hand-in-hand with the development of Americanism, and may also have avoided copyright issues. Regarding the 60 illustrations, in 2023, a librarian identified most of the artists in the London edition, hence also the American. To summarize, it seems likely that Tiebout and other American engravers were instructed to show only their own names on their works.

The Holy Bible. Tiebout's three earliest Bible illustrations were published in 1792, with five more in 1796. During 1801-1816, the Philadelphia publishing magnate Mathew Carey published at least ten Bibles. Counts of illustrations in these Bibles show that the engraver with the greatest number of illustrations was Tiebout. Other copperplate engravers (no doubt known personally to Tiebout through collaboration and competition) having more than 10 illustrations in Carey Bibles were Joseph H. Seymour, Benjamin Tanner, Peter Rushton Maverick, Francis Kearney (Kearny), John Boyd, and Amos Doolittle.

Typical of the reference to a British Bible in the prefatory pages of Carey's Bibles is this phrase: "Printed from the last Oxford edition." However, searches at Oxford University Press, several British university library collections, and the British Library, found no British Bible with illustrations that match those by Tiebout in the Carey Bibles. This leaves open the remarkable possibility that Tiebout was the artist, as well as the engraver.

Among Tiebout's works is a view of the Last Supper. Carey paid Tiebout $75.00 for this engraving, and less than $70 for each of the other biblical engravings itemized in Carey's account books

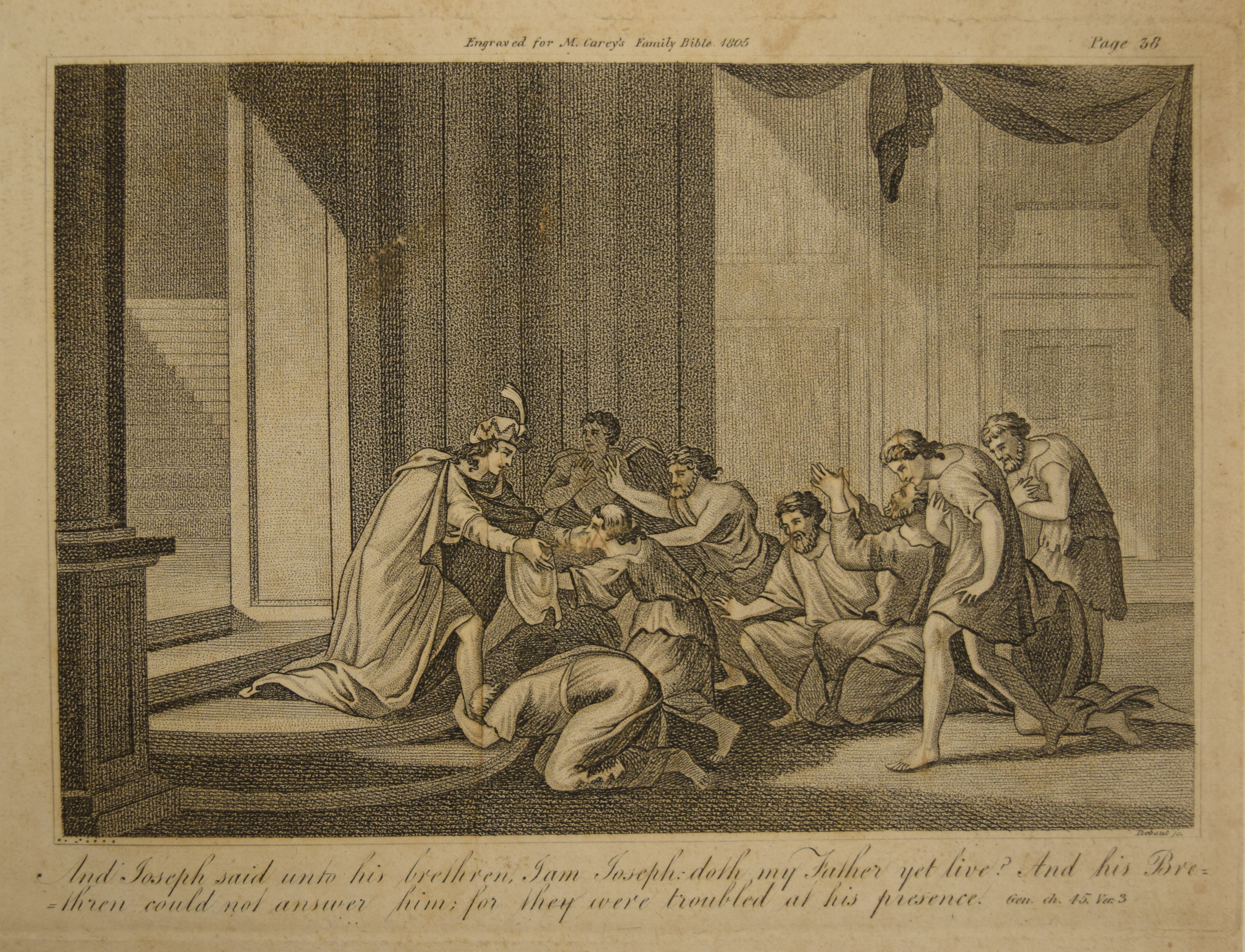
Joseph revealing himself to his brethren, from a Bible published by Mathew Carey

Of special interest among Tiebout's biblical engravings is one depicting Joseph revealing himself to his brothers—special because the actual copper plate for this engraving has survived. It can be seen online:

Mavor's Voyages. William Fordyce Mavor's 25-volume Historical Account of the Most Celebrated Voyages, Travels, and Discoveries from the time of Columbus to the present period was published in London, 1798-1802. The earliest American edition, including 26 engraved illustrations by Tiebout, consists of 24 volumes, published in Philadelphia, 1802-1803.

Rees's New Cyclopedia. These 39 volumes of text and 6 volumes of engraved plates, edited by Abraham Rees, were published serially in London, 1802-1820, and in several American cities as 41 volumes of text and 6 of plates, 1806-1820. Tiebout is one of 22 American engravers whose works appear in the first 5 plate-volumes. He engraved 77 of the signed plates. (In this case and others, Tiebout may have engraved some of the unsigned plates.)

Ferguson's Astronomy and Lectures. James Ferguson wrote two widely influential books published in London and later in America: (1) Astronomy Explained upon Sir Isaac Newton's Principles… and Ferguson's Lectures on Select Subjects: Mechanics…. First American editions of both books were published by Mathew Carey in 1806. The plates were later published separately for Astronomy by Abraham Small, Philadelphia, 1817, and for Lectures by Mathew Carey, 1814. Tiebout signed 23 engravings in Astronomy and 37 in Lectures.

Emporium of Arts and Sciences. This periodical, devoted to the interests of American and British inventors and scientists, was published in two separate series during 1812-1814. The principal engraver was Tiebout, who signed 50 of the engravings.

Frontispieces. For use as frontispieces for biographies and other books, Tiebout engraved images of the following people: Hugh Blair, Scottish minister and writer; Ann Eliza Bleecker, American poet; Robert Burns, Scottish poet; John Philpot Curran, Irish orator; Olaudah Equiano, abolitionist and former African slave; Thomas Gray, English poet; John Henry, English/American actor; John Hodgkinson, English/American actor; Frances Brett Hodgkinson, English/American actress; Charlotte Melmoth, English/American actress; Flavius Josephus, Jewish historian; William Fordyce Mavor, Scottish writer; John Milton, English poet; Alexander Pope, English poet; John Stanford, American religious leader; John Wesley, British founder of Methodism; and William White, Presiding Bishop of Episcopal Church of the United States.

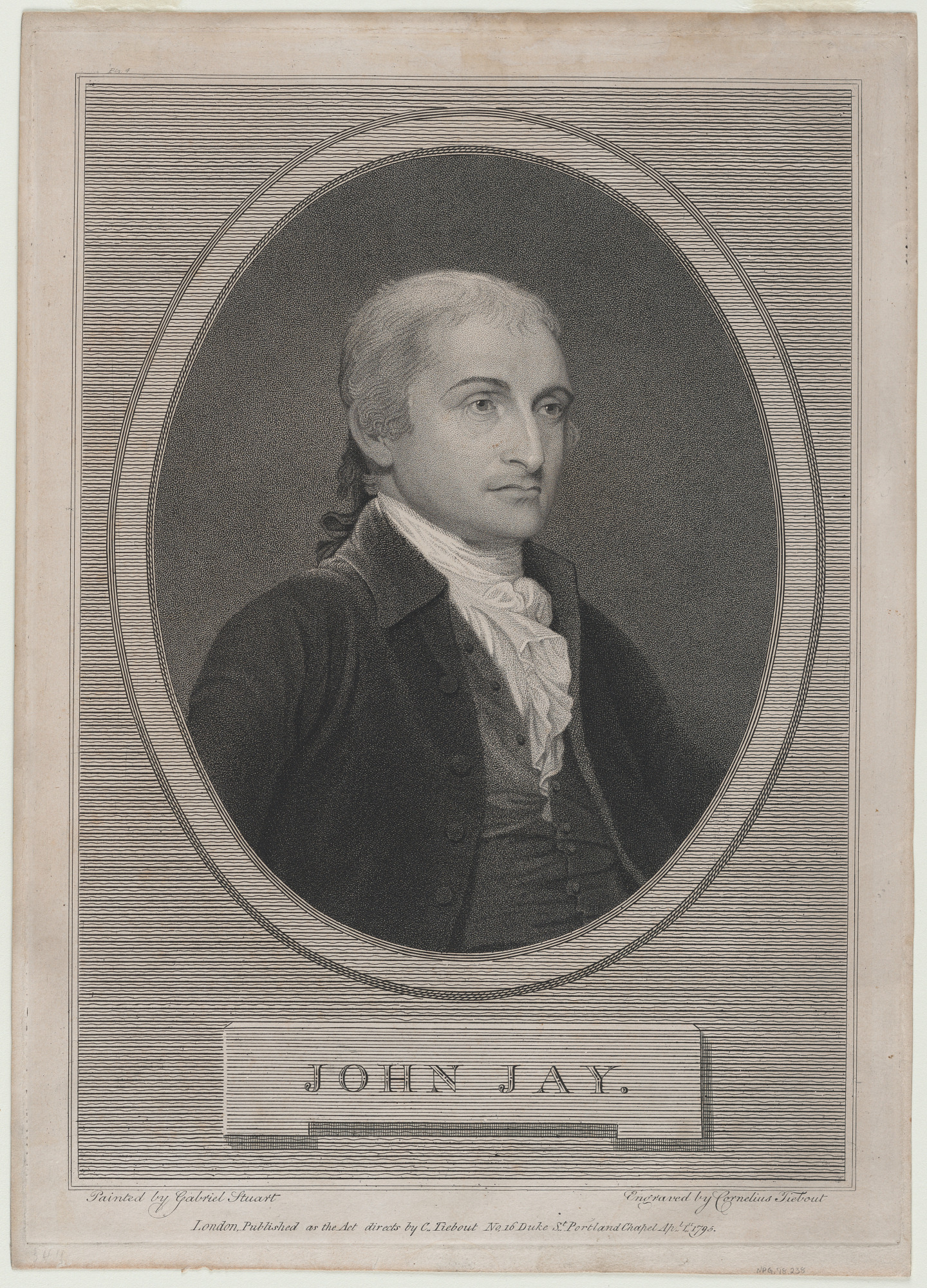
John Jay, "probably the first really good portrait engraved by an American-born professional engraver." (Stauffer)

Other portraits. Tiebout engraved other portraits as individual prints: U. S. presidents George Washington (4), John Adams, and Thomas Jefferson (3); governors John Jay, Thomas McKean (2), Simon Snyder, and George Clinton; and military leaders Thomas Truxton, Charles Cotesworth Pinckney, and Horatio Gates.

In 1809, two of Tiebout's engraved portraits appeared as frontispieces in best-selling novels: Charlotte Temple by Susanna Rowson and Elizabeth; or, the Exiles of Siberia, by Sophie Ristaud Cottin. Both novels, having already been published repeatedly in England and France, were published in Philadelphia by Mathew Carey. There appears to be no record of women who sat for these images, so that, here again, possibly Tiebout was not only the engraver, but also the artist.

Distinctly American Engravings. As early as 1803, Tiebout made engravings for a book that was published in America before it was published in England. That book and other publications include the following:

Elements of Botany. Three of Tiebout's engravings are included in this book by Benjamin Smith Barton. The book was published in Philadelphia in 1803, and published in London in 1804.

Flora of North America. This book by William P. C. Barton, nephew of B. S. Barton, was published in three volumes. The 29 plates engraved by Tiebout receive special attention and praise in the prefatory pages of volume 1 for his use of a "new style of engraving" called the French method. Barton writes, "These plates are printed in colour, and are afterwards coloured by hand." This style, known a à la poupée, requires very considerable skill and artistry…"

The Young Carpenter's Assistant. A leading Philadelphia architect, Owen Biddle (1774-1806) wrote this book, first published in 1805. It includes 19 plates engraved by Tiebout.

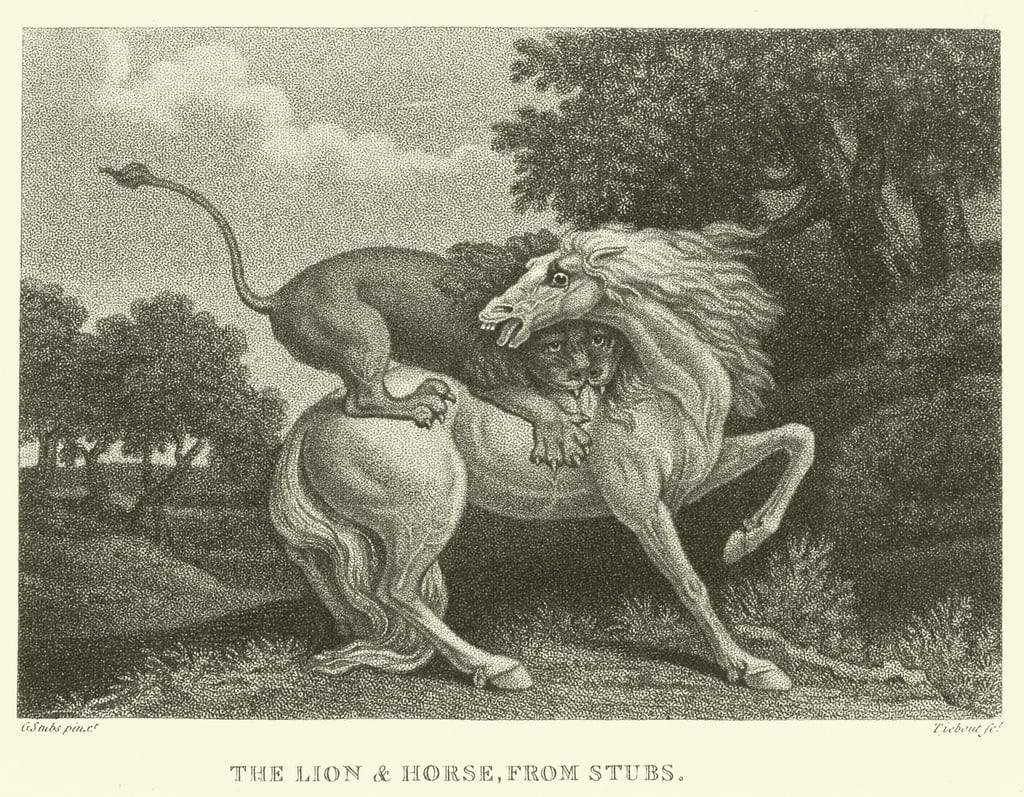
The Lion and Horse, engraved by Cornelius Tiebout, after George Stubbs

The Port Folio. During 1809-1815, ten Tiebout engravings were published in The Port Folio, a Philadelphia magazine that was of great interest to engravers. Shown here is one of the ten, featuring a lion on the back of a horse, after British artist George Stubbs. Another of the ten engravings shows a rustic cottage scene, after British artist William Redmore Bigg. According to History of Philadelphia, this engraving "attracted much attention for being larger than the usual size, a mechanical contrivance of Tiebout's invention enabling the artist to execute most of the work without using the common graver." In The Port Folio, the narrative accompanying this distinctive engraving is called "a specimen of a new style in the graphic art, invented by Mr. C. Tiebout."

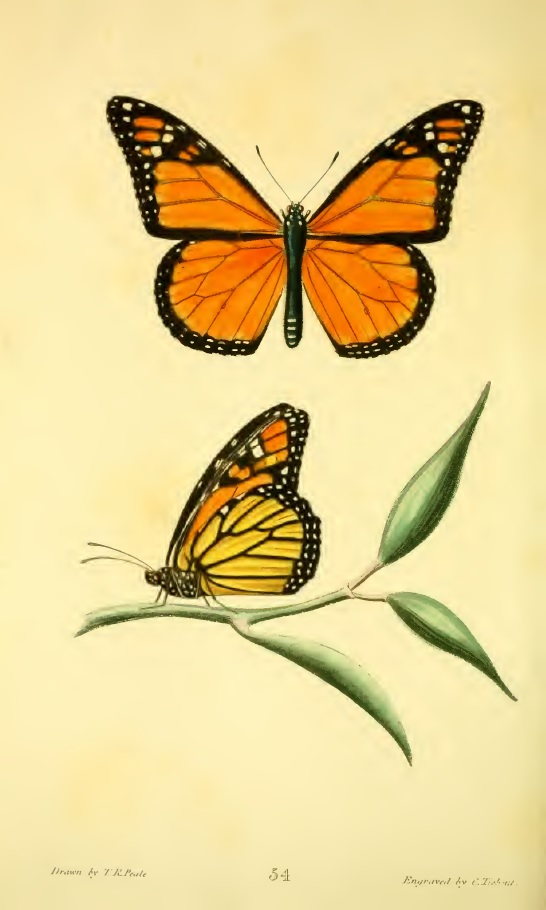
Monarch Butterfly, from Thomas Say's American Entomology

American Entomology. Thomas Say's American Entomology was published in three volumes, in 1824, 1825, and 1828. The first two were published in Philadelphia before both Say and Tiebout moved to New Harmony, Indiana, in 1826. The artists of the 54 plates in the three volumes were Titian Ramsey Peale, Charles-Alexandre Lesueur, W. W. Wood, and H. B. Bridport. Six of the plates are unsigned. The engravers' signatures on the other plates are by Tiebout, G. Lang, and Longacre, and "Mr. C. Tiebout engraved nearly all of them."

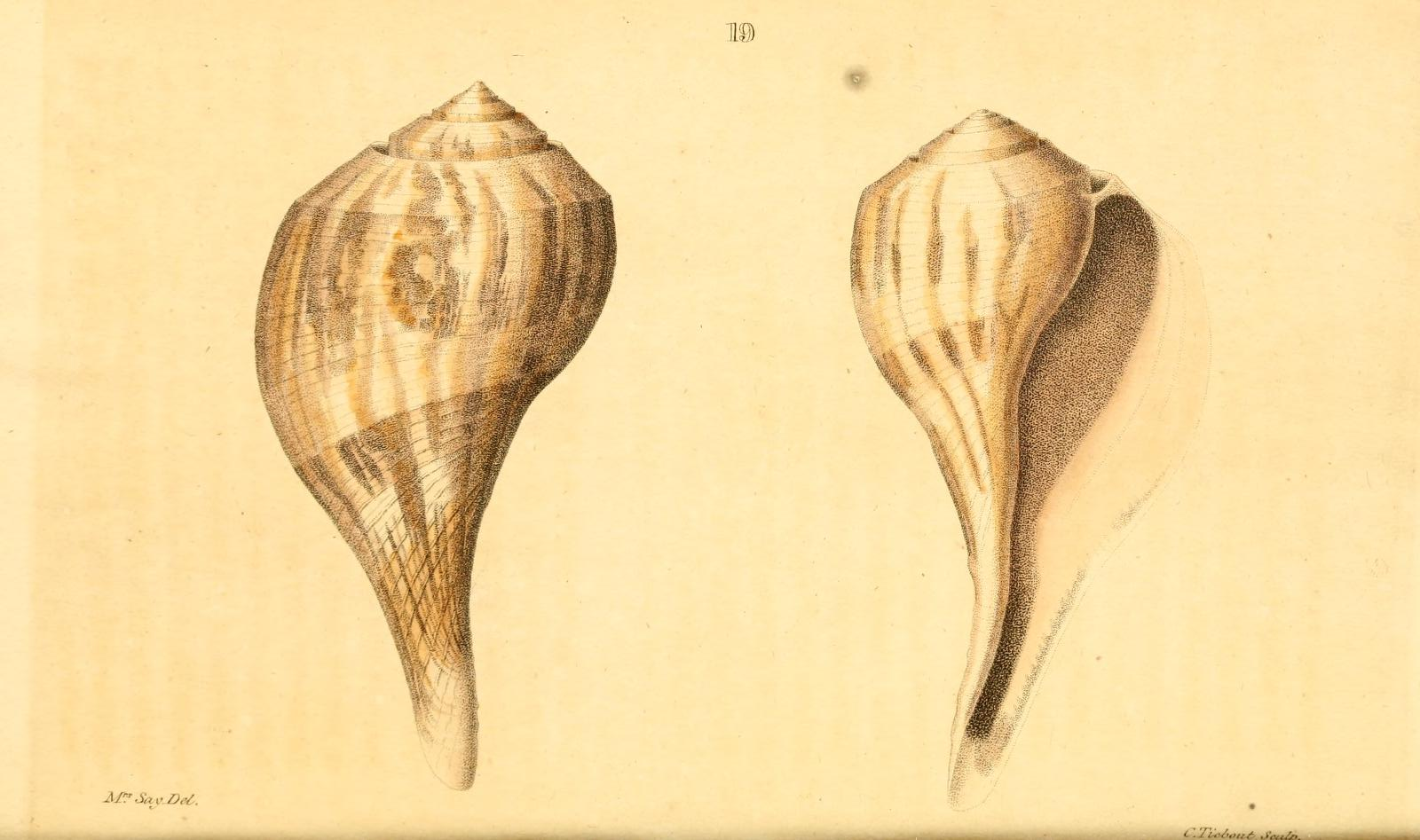
Fulgur pyruloides, from Thomas Say's American Conchology

American Conchology. In New Harmony, Tiebout engraved 33 plates for Thomas Say's American Conchology. The first four parts of this book were published at the School Press (also known as Maclure's Press) in New Harmony. These plates show the signature "Mrs. Say" for the artist, referring to Lucy Say, who hand-colored the plates. Possibly Tiebout's three engravings in Part IV, dated March, 1832, were his last signed engravings.
