= Scraps =

Scraps may refer to:

== Arts and entertainment ==
- Scraps (album), a 1972 album by the rock band NRBQ
- Scraps the Patchwork Girl, a character in the Oz books
- Grady Scraps, a character in several Spider-Man storylines
- Scraps (American magazine) (1828–1849), an annual satirical publication

== Other uses ==
- 'Scraps', small pieces of food that have not been eaten and are usually thrown away
- Scraps (batter), leftover fried batter that is sometimes eaten in the North of England
- Johannes Scraps Wessels (1871–1929), South African international rugby union player

== See also ==
- Scrap
