= Speranza =

Speranza is the Italian word for hope. It could refer to one of several things:

== People ==
- Alessandro Speranza, an Italian composer
- Giovanni Speranza, an Italian soccer player
- Guy Speranza, an American singer with the band Riot
- M. Grazia Speranza, Italian applied mathematician and operations researcher
- Norma Jean Speranza, the birth name of US pop singer Jill Corey
- Sandro Finocchio Speranza, the birth name of Sandro Finoglio, a Venezuelan TV show host
- Vincent Speranza, an American WW2 veteran
- A pseudonym used by the Irish poet Jane Wilde

== Films ==
- Il viale della speranza, a 1953 Italian drama film directed by Dino Risi
- La grande speranza, a 1954 anti-war film
- Due soldi di speranza, a 1952 film directed by Renato Castellani
- Il Cammino della speranza, a 1950 Italian language drama film directed by Pietro Germi

== Other ==
- Speranza (moth), a genus of geometrid moths
- Speranza Motors, a brand used by Chery Automobile
- Speranza Park, the former home of the Toledo Maumees baseball team
- Icaria Speranza, a colony of the Icarians utopian movement
- A character in Edmund Spenser's The Faerie Queene
- A city in the game ARC Raiders
