= Otto mesi in due ore =

Opera by Gaetano Donizetti

- Opera by Gaetano Donizetti
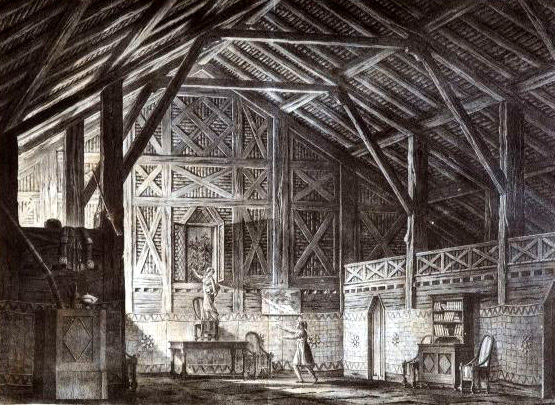
- Original stage setting for act 1, Naples, 1827
- Librettist: Domenico Gilardoni
- Language: Italian
- Based on: Elisabeth, ou Les exilés de Sibérie by Sophie Ristaud Cottin
- Premiere: 13 May 1827; Teatro Nuovo, Naples

Otto mesi in due ore ossia Gli esiliati in Siberia (Eight Months in Two Hours or The Exiles in Siberia) is an opera in three acts by Gaetano Donizetti to a libretto by Domenico Gilardoni.

The original story comes from the 1806 novel, Elisabeth, ou Les exilés de Sibérie (Elisabeth, or the Exiles of Siberia), written by Sophie Ristaud Cottin. Luigi Marchionni's subsequent play, La figlia dell’esiliato, ossia Otto mesi in due ore (The Daughter of the Exile, or Eight Months in Two Hours), first performed in Italy in 1820, was the more immediate basis for Gilardoni's libretto.

The opera has two later, substantially re-worked versions, Élisabeth ou la fille de l'exilé (Elisabeth, or the daughter of the exile), and Elisabetta, both of which received their first performances some 150 years after Donizetti's death.

== Performance history ==
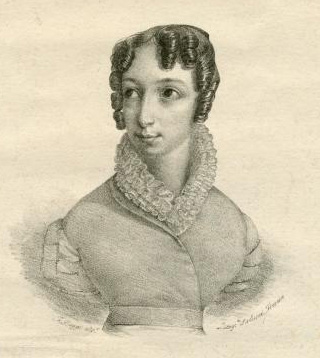
Caterina Lipparini who created the role of Elisabetta in Otto mesi in due ore, Naples, 1827

19th century

The opera underwent many revisions and changes of title over the years, with a performance history nearly as convoluted as its plot. Its first version premiered with the title Otto mesi in due ore at the Teatro Nuovo in Naples on 13 May 1827, and was performed 50 times in its first season. In 1831, it was presented in Florence by Luigi Astolfi to only limited success as Gli esiliati in Siberia. In 1832, Donizetti revised the opera somewhat, adapting the original soprano role of Elisabetta for the popular Austro-Hungarian contralto, Caroline Ungher. He revised the opera further for its premiere in Livorno in 1833.

Between 1838 and 1840 Donizetti substantially re-worked the opera again, adding new music, for a longer version, Élisabeth ou la fille de l'exilé which was intended for performance in Paris. The new French libretto was written by Adolphe de Leuven and Léon-Lévy Brunswick. The American musicologist Will Crutchfield has suggested that by this point, it had now a become virtually a separate opera from Otto mesi in due ore, although clearly retaining many elements of the original. However, the new work was never staged in Donizetti's lifetime. Donizetti subsequently offered the Italian version, Elisabetta, to Her Majesty's Theatre in London. Likewise, this version was never performed in his lifetime.

The Italian composer Uranio Fontana, who claimed to have been a pupil of Donizetti, attempted to resurrect the French version after Donizetti's death. However, according to Will Crutchfield, Fontana did not have access to Donizetti's revised score, which by this time had ended up in London. Instead, he tried to set the original score of Otto mesi to the longer De Leuven and Brunswick libretto and composed the missing music (over half the opera) himself. The Fontana version premiered at the Théâtre Lyrique in Paris in 1853.

20th century and beyond

The long forgotten score for Elisabetta was later found in the basement of London's Royal Opera House. Acts 1 and 3 were found by Will Crutchfield in 1984, and Act 2 by Richard Bonynge in 1988. It received its first performance, with the score edited by Will Crutchfield and Roger Parker, at the Royal Festival Hall in London on 16 December 1997. Carlo Rizzi conducted the Royal Opera House Orchestra and Chorus in a concert performance with Andrea Rost singing the role of Elisabetta, and the young Juan Diego Flórez as Count Potoski.

The first performance of the 1840 French version, Élisabeth ou la fille de l'exilé, using only Donizetti's music, took place at the Caramoor International Music Festival on 17 July 2003. Will Crutchfield conducted the Orchestra of St. Luke's in a semi-staged production. Irini Tsirakidis sang the role of Élisabeth, and Yeghishe Manucharyan was Count Potoski. To prepare the Caramoor performing edition, Crutchfield worked with the French manuscript, using the orchestration from the London version, and the original score of Otto mesi in due ore to construct the final aria. The recitatives from Elisabetta were adapted to spoken dialogue as the French version was intended to be an opéra comique.

== Roles ==
Role	Voice type	Premiere Cast, 13 May 1827 (Conductor unknown)
L'imperatore, Tsar	tenor	Antonio Manzi
Il Grande Maresciallo, Grand Marshal	bass	Giuseppe Fioravanti
Conte Stanislao Potoski	tenor	Giuseppe Loira
Contessa Fedora, Potoski's wife	mezzo-soprano	Signora Servoli
Elisabetta, their daughter	soprano	Caterina Lipparini
Maria, Elisabetta's nurse	mezzo-soprano	Francesca Ceccherini
Michele, Maria's son and messenger for the Russian government	bass	Gennaro Luzio
Ivano, a former aristocrat, now a ferryman on the Kama river	bass	Vincenzo Galli
Alterkan, leader of the Tartar hordes	bass	Raffaele Scalese
Orzak, another Tartar leader	tenor	Giuseppe Papi

== Synopsis ==
=== Act 1 ===
Saimika, Siberia

Having been wrongly exiled, Count Stanislao Potoski, his wife, Countess Fedora, and their daughter, Elisabetta, are living in a ramshackle dwelling attached to an abbey. Elisabetta vows to undertake an arduous journey on foot to Moscow to seek a pardon from the Tsar.

=== Act 2 ===
The shores of the Kama River

Elisabetta is befriended by Tartar hordes, who had initially threatened her but were won over by her innocence and virtue. She also meets Ivano, the man responsible for her parents' exile, who is now working as a ferryman at the river. When the river floods, Elisabetta saves herself by making a raft from the wooden tomb of Ivano's dead daughter.

=== Act 3 ===
A grand chamber in the Kremlin

The Grand Marshal, who is also partly responsible for the Potoski family's exile, tries to cause trouble for Elisabetta. Nevertheless, she manages to reach the Tsar, who in the meantime has received a letter from his messenger Michele (a friend of Elisabetta and the son of her nurse) explaining the injustice of their exile. The Tsar pardons the whole family who are then reunited in Moscow.

== Recordings ==
As Otto mesi

Year	Cast (Elisabetta, Potoski, Fedora, Maria)	Conductor, Opera House and Orchestra	Label
1999	Brigitte Hahn, Luca Canonici, Christine Neithardt-Barbaux, Alessandra Palomba	Enrique Diemecke, Orchestre National de Montpellier and the Chorus of Radio Lettone (Recording of a concert performance in Montpelier, 12 July)	Audio CD: Actes Sud; Cat: AD124

As Elisabetta

Year	Cast (Elisabetta, Potoski, Fedora, Maria, Michele)	Conductor, Opera House and Orchestra	Label
1997	Andrea Rost, Juan Diego Flórez, Leah-Marian Jones, Anne-Marie Owens, Alessandro Corbelli	Carlo Rizzi, Orchestra and Chorus of the Royal Opera House, Covent Garden, (Recording of a concert performance in the Royal Festival Hall, 16 December. The performance was broadcast by BBC Radio 3 on 22 December 1997)	Audio CD: Charles Handelman, Live Opera, (unnumbered)
