= Helena Dix =

Australian opera soprano (born 1979)

Helena Dix (born 26 May 1979) is an Australian opera singer. She sings soprano, and is a specialist in bel canto roles. In 2005 Dix represented Australia in BBC Cardiff Singer of the World competition.

== Early life and education ==
Helena Dix was born on 26 May 1979 in Melbourne, Australia.

She attended Caulfield Grammar School and gained a scholarship to Melba Memorial Conservatorium of Music, where she studied with her first teacher Margaret Nisbett. She went on to do a postgraduate diploma in opera at the Royal Academy of Music in London, where she held an ABRSM scholarship and studied with Elizabeth Ritchie.

== Career ==
Dix's operatic repertoire includes the title role in Cristina, regina di Svezia for Wexford Festival Opera, Oldenburgisches Staatstheater and Chelsea Opera Group. Elettra in Idomeneo and Odabella in Attila for Staatstheater Nürnberg and Theater Lübeck. Gioconda in La Gioconda for Proyecto Ópera University of Valladolid, Flowermaiden in Parsifal for English National Opera, Elvira (cover) in Ernani for the Metropolitan Opera, Isabella in Das Liebesverbot for Chelsea Opera Group. Rosalinde in Die Fledermaus and Hanna Glawari in The Merry Widow for Scottish Opera where she has also covered Frasquita in Carmen and Karolina in The Two Widows. Also, Fiordiligi in Cosi fan tutte, Donna Anna in Don Giovanni, Contessa in Le Nozze di Figaro and Nella in Gianni Schicchi for the Opera Project.

In 2014 Dix was nominated in the Best Young Singer category in the International Opera Awards.

Dix has developed a long working relationship with privately funded Melbourne Opera in Victoria, Australia, returning in 2014 to perform her first Wagner role as Elsa in Lohengrin as well as many of the bel canto roles; Norma (Bellini) and Elisabetta (Elizabeth I) in Roberto Devereux (Donizetti) and most recently, Lady Macbeth from Verdi's Macbeth and Lucrezia Borgia from Donizetti's opera of the same name.

In April 2020, Dix contracted COVID-19 that developed complications and required her to be hospitalised; she was featured in media outlets talking about using her operatic training to rehabilitate her body post infection.

For many years Dix has understudied roles at the Metropolitan Opera in New York, making her main stage debut in Verdi's Falstaff as Alice Ford. In March 2023, due to the last-minute withdrawal of Sonya Yoncheva, Dix gave her Metropolitan debut as Norma (Bellini). An audio recording of the performance, which includes Michael Spyres as Pollione and Ekaterina Gubanova as Adalgisa and is conducted by Maurizio Benini, is available for streaming at Met Opera on Demand.

== Critical reception ==
Dix's portrayal of Elizabeth I in Roberto Devereux received positive reviews. Rob Holdsworth said she was "The most exciting voice since Sutherland" and The Age wrote:

The Australian-born soprano sang one of opera's most demanding roles flawlessly, from florid coloratura to (literally) high drama via ravishingly delicate pianissimos. But what was most extraordinarily impressive was her acting, vocally and physically, by turns a termagant, fragile, nervous, regal, vulnerable – a woman in love with a man 30 years younger, rightly doubting that it is requited. Dix gets 8 out of 5 stars.

The Arts Desk praised her performance in Das Liebesverbot:

In Wagner, she seemed to me more impressive, personable and occasionally witty in this demented role which veers from Beethoven's Leonore ... to bel canto heroine and even French comic minx. The gleaming if slightly metallic middle register gives great focus to intelligent recitative, and all the top notes work for her.

Her portrayal of Lady Macbeth in Verdi's Macbeth was highly praised by Cassidy Knowlton of Time Out Melbourne, who wrote:

Helena Dix is jaw-dropping as Lady Macbeth, spitting her lines with palpable venom as she pushes her hapless husband on a path towards glory – and death. She's a force of nature, her powerful soprano freezing the blood and catching fire all at once. And in that scene, she's tremendous, scrubbing at her imaginary bloodstains with such impassioned madness it seemed like she was going to lose a finger.

== Recognition and honours ==
In 2005 Dix represented Australia in BBC Cardiff Singer of the World.

In 2015 she made an associate of the Royal Academy of Music for her significant contribution to the music industry.
