= Lucy Say =

American naturalist and scientific illustrator (1800–1886)

Lucy Way Sistare Say
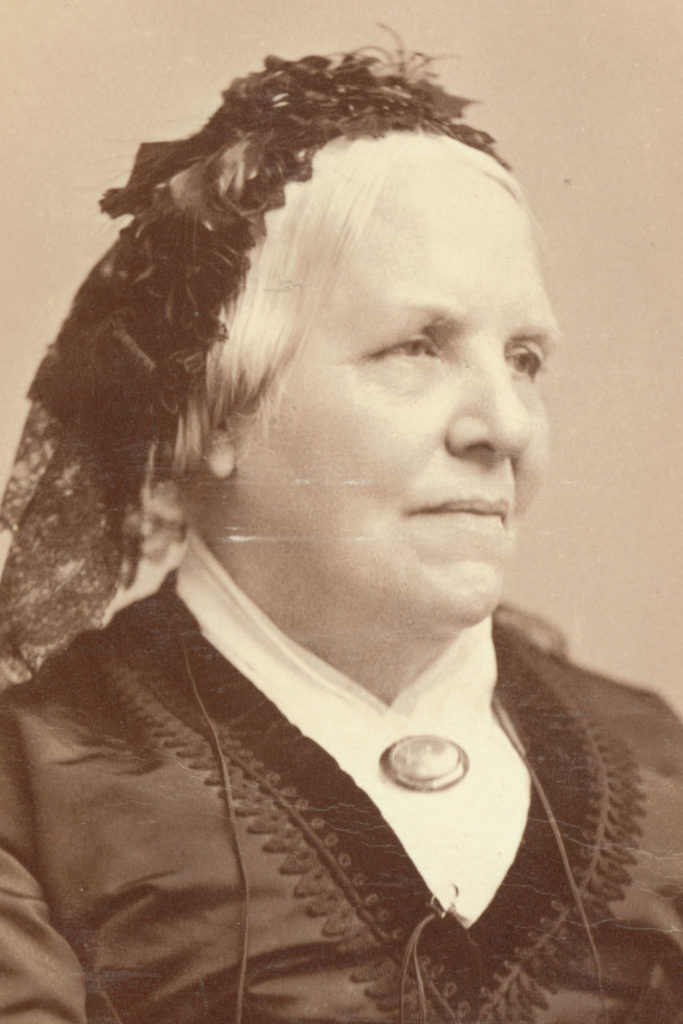
- Lucy Say, c. 1863
- Born: November 28, 1800; New London, Connecticut
- Died: November 15, 1886 (aged 85); Lexington, Massachusetts
- Known for: nature art
- Notable work: American Conchology

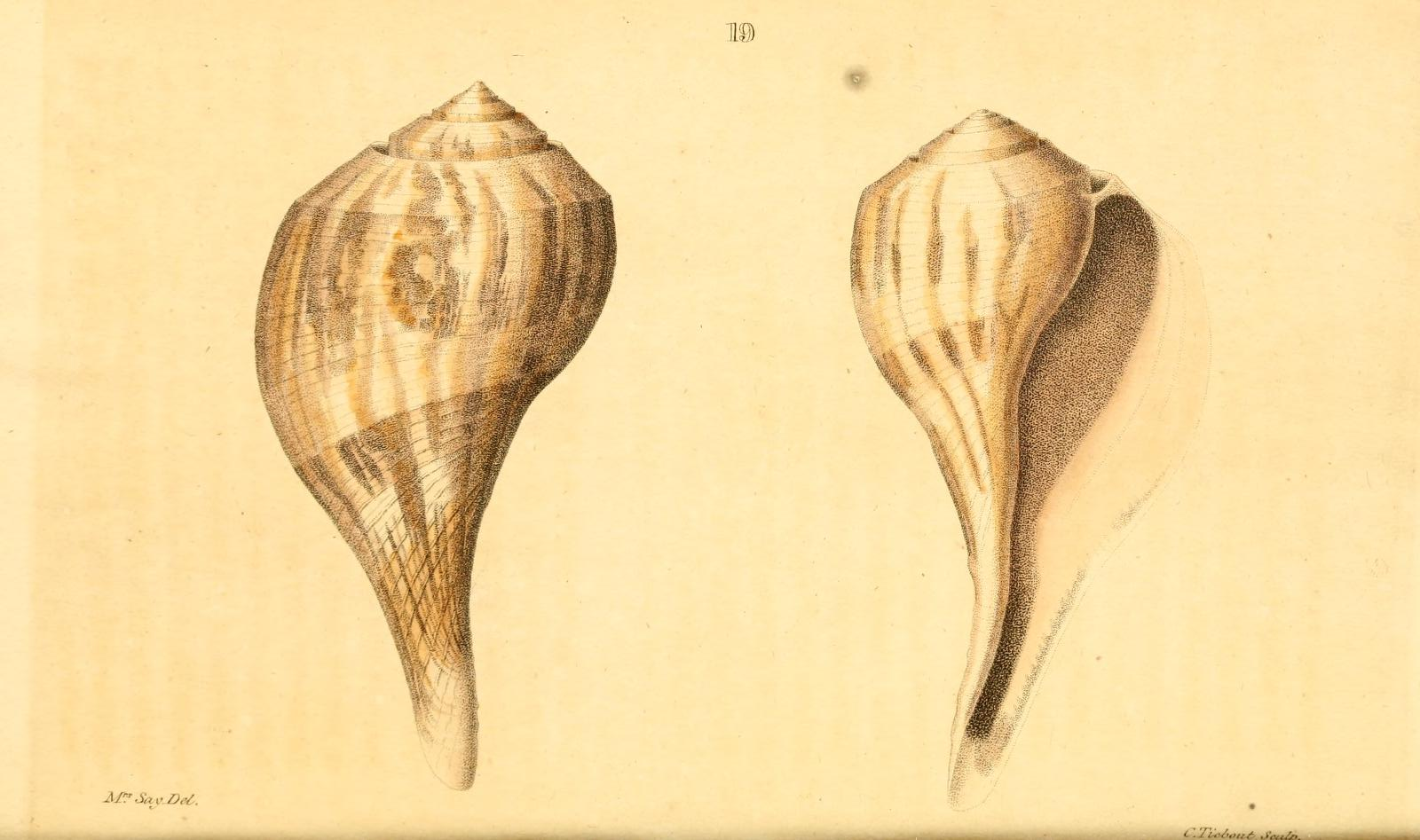
Fulgur pyruloides Plate XIX by Lucy Say in "American conchology; or, Descriptions of the shells of North America".

Lucy Way Sistare Say (November 28, 1800 – November 15, 1886) was an American naturalist and scientific artist. Say illustrated and colored 66 of 68 plates included in American Conchology, a depiction of the North American mollusks collected by her husband, Thomas Say, during his expeditions in North America. Lucy Say became the first female member of the Academy of Natural Sciences of Philadelphia (ANSP) on October 26, 1841.

== Early life and education ==
Born in New London, Connecticut, Lucy Way Sistare Say was one of ten children born to Joseph and Nancy Way Sistare. Her first known education was at a Pestalozzian girls school in Philadelphia, operated by Marie Duclos Fretageot. She studied illustration under French naturalist and illustrator Charles Alexandre Lesueur and John James Audubon. She met her future husband, Thomas Say, through other artists and naturalists at the Fretageot school.

== Career ==
While in Philadelphia, Lucy Say became acquainted with many other naturalists, including some of the founders of the Academy of Natural Sciences. She joined a group of prominent scientists, educators, and artists on a keelboat known as "Boatload of Knowledge," which traveled along the Ohio River from Pittsburgh, Pennsylvania during the winter of 1825–1826 to form a utopian socialist community in New Harmony, Indiana. During the voyage to New Harmony, she became acquainted with naturalist Thomas Say and they married on January 4, 1827.

Lucy Say taught illustration in New Harmony while her husband carried out scientific research expeditions; among her students were David Dale Owen and Richard Owen, Indiana's first and third state geologists. Due to the frontier nature of the town, and especially from the liberal views supporting equality of the sexes advocated by community leaders Robert Owen and William Maclure, women faced fewer social restrictions in New Harmony than in other eastern American cities. When Say returned to New York City in 1834 following her husband's death, she described her new life as "too circumscribed, I long for the freedom I used to enjoy when I lived on the Banks of the Wabash."

Say's drawing and painting skills were applied in earnest when she undertook to illustrate Thomas's monographic work, American Conchology. Besides furnishing drawings for 66 of the work's 68 plates, Say performed much of the painstaking coloring of individual impressions, which came to number in the thousands. She was assisted in this task by two of engraver Cornelius Tiebout's children, Henry and Caroline. R.E. Banta wrote in 1938 that these colored plates "surpass anything else produced in this country [at that time] in delicacy and accuracy of detail. Each shell is a masterpiece of miniature painting which, apparently, involved hours of labor." After her husband's death, Say began engraving the plates herself.

Say devoted her remaining years to supporting the study of natural sciences and maintaining her late husband's reputation. She donated his entomological collection and library to the ANSP. In 1840, Say began a correspondence with Samuel Stehman Haldeman (1812–1880), whom she viewed as a capable successor to her husband's research in conchology and entomology. She formed a small cabinet of her own and exchanged shell specimens with Haldeman. Say was elected the first female member of the ANSP on 26 October 1841, and a member of its Conchological Section in 1868. She died in 1886.
