= Cyrille Cottin =

French industrialist and racing driver

- Born: Cyrille-Edouard Cottin; 28 September 1870; Vevey, Switzerland
- Died: 13 February 1942 (aged 71); Lyon, France
- Occupations: co-founder of Cottin & Desgouttes, Race driving
- Spouse: Adda Bourras
- Parent(s): Cyrille Cottin and Louise Payen

Cyrille-Edouard Cottin (28 September 1870 – 13 February 1942) was a French industrialist and racing driver, co-founder of the Automobiles Cottin et Desgouttes company.

== Life ==
Cyrille Edouard Cottin was the 4th of the 7 children of Cyrille Cottin who had married Louise Payen in 1863, hailing from a large family of the Lyon bourgeoisie, the descendants of which have had numerous alliances with French nobility. His father held his fortune from the family silk business created in 1830 and of which he was an associate: "Les petits fils de Claude-Joseph Bonnet".

Due to the large number of descendants of the latter, the custom was that only the elder sons of each branch could enter the business. Thus, Cottin, who could not enter, created his own business and teamed with Pierre Desgoutte in 1906, when he was 36 years old.

He invested his fortune, helped by his wife's dowry (born Adda Bourras), and the trust which he got from his friends, relationships and family in the Lyons middle-class.

The technical competence of Pierre Desgoutte, along with his charisma allowed the new company Cottin & Desgoutte to develop rapidly.

Cottin was also first-class racing driver, racing both in France and abroad in North Africa, Zurich and Australia where he won the 400-mile Race. After World War I, he returned to competition, winning regularly on his famous M Type.

When the company encountered its first difficulties in 1929, André Citroën, who was already mass-producing automobiles, proposed to acquire the company. Through pride, Cottin refused and eventually lost most of his fortune.
