= Vincenzo Galli =

Italian opera singer (1798–1858)

Vincenzo Galli (1798 – 23 November 1858) was an Italian opera singer and impresario. Considered an outstanding basso buffo singer, he created many roles on Italian stages, including in two of Donizetti's operas: Ivano in Otto mesi in due ore and Cesare Salzapariglia in Le convenienze ed inconvenienze teatrali. Luigi Ricci composed the role of Michelotto in his opera Chiara di Rosemberg specifically for Galli's voice.

== Life and career ==
Galli was born in Rome, the younger brother of Filippo Galli, an even more famous bass. Vincenzo was sometimes referred to as "il Galli minore" (the minor Galli). He made his stage debut at the Teatro Argentina in Rome in 1819 as Eugaro in Giuseppe Nicolini's Giulio Cesare nelle Gallie and his La Scala debut in 1824 as Giorgio in Rossini's Torvaldo e Dorliska with his brother Filippo as the Duke of Ordow. Galli was very active in Italian opera houses, primarily at La Scala, throughout the 1820s and 30s when he sang in numerous world and Italian premieres. He sang in Lisbon in the 1842/43 season at the Theatro de São Carlos, primarily in Donizetti operas, and then returned to Milan for the 1844/45 season at the Teatro della Canobbiana where he sang in several Rossini and Donizetti operas. In the 1840s he also formed his own travelling opera company which Jacopo Foroni joined as the conductor in 1848. While the company was in residence at Stockholm's Mindre Theatre, it premiered Foroni's opera Cristina, regina di Svezia.

In 1850 he appeared at the Théâtre-Italien in Paris as Bartolo in Il barbiere di Siviglia. His last stage performance was as Don Annibale Pistacchio in Donizetti's Il campanello at the St James's Theatre in London in November 1857. The critic in The Musical World described him as "an excellent buffo" who contributed to the opera's success with the London audience. Galli died of a stroke in Milan a year later at the age of 60. According to Francesco Regli, he was a "handsome and jovial figure whose voice remained strong and in tune throughout his career." Galli's son Achille (1829–1905) was a composer and teacher of piano and voice.

== Roles created ==
- Gennaro in Carafa's Il sonnambulo, La Scala, Milan 13 November 1824
- Gondair in Pacini's, Gli arabi nelle Gallie o sia Il trionfo della fede, La Scala, Milan, 8 March 1827
- Ivano in Donizetti's Otto mesi in due ore, Teatro Nuovo, Naples, 13 May 1827
- Cesare Salzapariglia in Donizetti's Le convenienze ed inconvenienze teatrali, Teatro Nuovo, Naples, 21 November 1827
- Baccellone in Carlo Cappelletti's La contessina ossia Il finto pascià, Teatro Comunale, Bologna, 9 February 1830
- Gabriele in Pavesi's Donna Bianca d'Avenello, Teatro della Canobbiana, Milan, 3 November 1830
- Gluglu in Strepponi's L'Ullà di Bassora, La Scala, Milan, 20 September 1831
- Michelotto in Luigi Ricci's Chiara di Rosemberg, La Scala, Milan, 11 October 1831
- Jonas in Coccia's Enrico di Monfort, La Scala, Milan, 12 November 1831
- Tommaso in Luigi Ricci's Un'avventura di Scaramuccia, La Scala, Milan, 8 March 1834
- Gian Antonio Bruciacore in Pugni's Un episodio di San Michele, Teatro della Canobbiana, Milan, 14 June 1834
- Falstaff in Mercadante's La gioventù di Enrico V, La Scala, Milan, 25 November 1834
- Roggiero in Luigi Somma's Ildegonda e Rizzardo, Teatro della Canobbiana, Milan, 20 April 1835
- Lajeunesse in Federico Ricci's Monsieur de Chalumeaux, Teatro San Benedetto, Venice, 14 June 1835
- Giorgio in Giuseppe Rustici's Maria di Provenza, Teatro della Canobbiana, Milan, 15 April 1837
- Tranquillo Cassano in Coppola's La bella Celeste degli Spadari, Teatro della Canobbiana, Milan, 14 June 1837
- Lattanzio in Giuseppe Manusardi's L'ammalata e il consulto Teatro della Canobbiana, Milan, 24 June 1837
