= Cristina, regina di Svezia =

1849 opera by Jacopo Foroni

- Opera by Jacopo Foroni
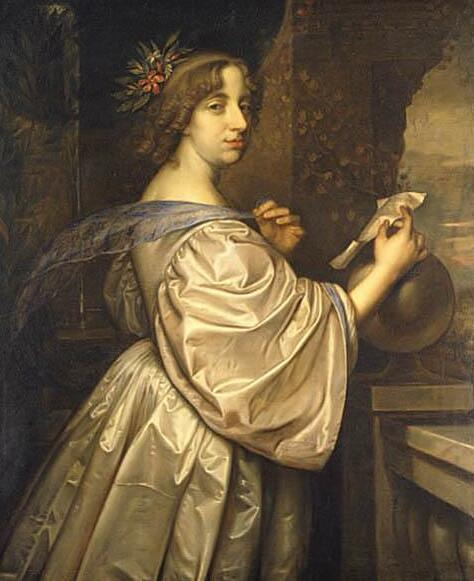
- Christina, Queen of Sweden, the opera's protagonist
- Librettist: Giovanni Carlo Casanova
- Language: Italian
- Premiere: 18 May 1849; Mindre Theatre, Stockholm

Cristina, regina di Svezia (Christina, Queen of Sweden) is an opera in five parts and three acts composed by Jacopo Foroni. The Italian libretto by Giovanni Carlo Casanova is loosely based on the events surrounding the abdication of Christina, Queen of Sweden in 1654. The opera premiered on 22 May 1849 at the Mindre Theatre in Stockholm.

== Background and performance history ==
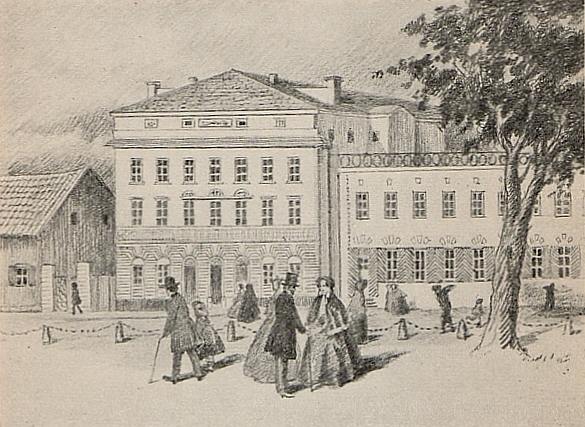
Mindre Theatre in Stockholm where Cristina, regina di Svezia premiered in 1849

Cristina, regina di Svezia was Jacopo Foroni's second opera. His first, Margherita, had premiered in Milan in 1848. However, his involvement with the Five Days of Milan uprising had made life dangerous in the city and led him to seek work abroad. He became the conductor of Vincenzo Galli's Italian opera company which by the autumn of 1848 had taken up residence in Stockholm's Mindre Theatre. Foroni composed Cristina to introduce himself to Swedish audiences. The librettist, Giovanni Carlo Casanova, was also a basso cantante singer in Galli's company. The opera premiered at the Mindre Theatre on 22 May 1849 and was dedicated to Oscar I of Sweden, the reigning monarch at the time. Hans Christian Andersen was at the premiere and wrote enthusiastically about it. The success of the opera led to Foroni being appointed as the chief conductor at the Royal Swedish Opera later that year.

In the autumn of 1850 the opera was given its Italian premiere when Foroni himself conducted its performance at the Gran Teatro Civico in Trieste. Over the next 8 years he continued in his post at the Royal Swedish Opera and composed music for royal occasions and concerts. Foroni wrote only two more operas before his death from cholera at the age of 33. Although the overture to Cristina was heard occasionally in 19th century concerts, both the composer and the work itself fell into obscurity.

However, it was revived at the 2007 Vadstena Summer Opera Festival, and in 2010 it was recorded for the first time with a performance by the Göteborg Opera conducted by Tobias Ringborg. It was performed again at Wexford Festival Opera in October and November 2013 with Helena Dix in the title role. The Wexford production, directed by Stephen Medcalf, updated the action to the 1930s and drew explicit parallels to the abdication of Edward VIII in 1936. The UK premiere of the work was performed in concert version by Chelsea Opera Group at London's Cadogan Hall on 8 November 2014.

== Roles ==
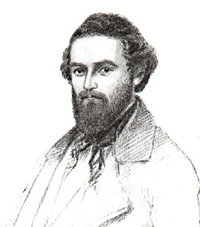
Jacopo Foroni

Role	Voice type	Premiere cast, 22 May 1849 Conductor: Jacopo Foroni
Cristina, Queen of Sweden	soprano	Rosina Penco
Gabriele de la Gardie, Cristina's favourite	tenor	
Maria Eufrosina, Cristina's cousin and Gabriele's secret lover	mezzo-soprano	
Axel Oxenstierna, Lord High Chancellor of Sweden	bass	Giovanni Carlo Casanova
Erik, Axel Oxenstierna's son	tenor	
Carlo Gustavo, Cristina's cousin and successor to the throne	baritone	
Arnold Messenius, Cristina's secret enemy	bass	
Johan, Messenius's son and co-conspirator	tenor	
Courtiers, officials, soldiers, conspirators, fishermen, noblewomen, common people

== Synopsis ==
=== Historical context ===
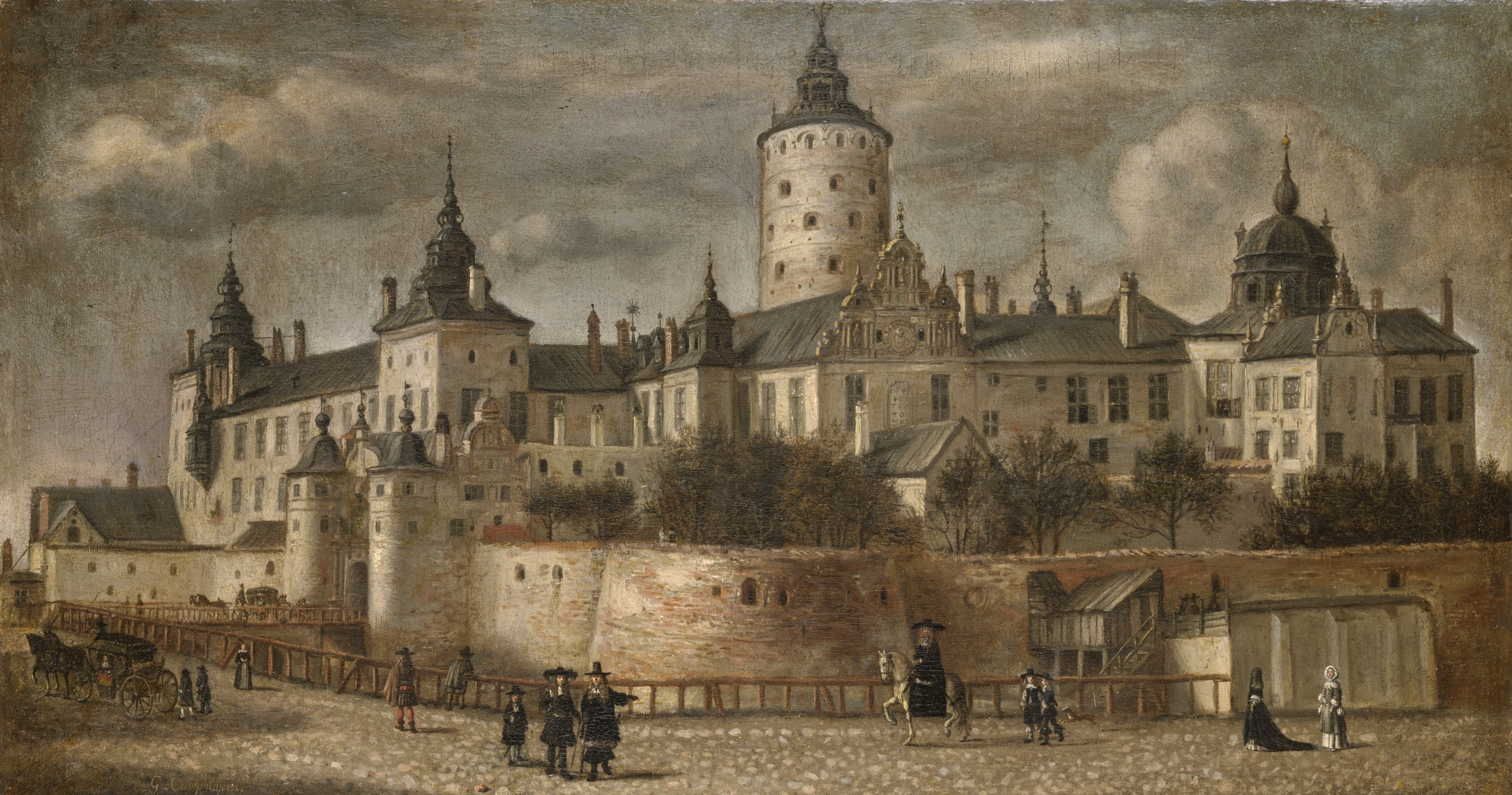
Tre Kronor castle where much of the opera's action is set

The opera takes place in the Tre Kronor castle in Stockholm and on an island in Saltsjön Bay in the weeks leading up to Queen Christina's abdication in 1654 and culminates with the abdication itself. All the central characters are real historical figures associated with Queen Christina, although considerable liberties are taken with the time sequences, conflating events in the mid-1650s with those which occurred several years earlier. Cristina's unrequited love for Gabriele (Magnus Gabriel De la Gardie) and jealousy of his lover Maria Eufrosina (Maria Eufrosyne of Zweibrücken) are central to the opera's plot, and she only consents to their marriage at the moment of her abdication. In historical fact, the couple had already married in 1647. The conspirators Arnold Messenius and his son Johan were executed in December 1651, nearly three years before her abdication.

=== Act 1 ===
Part 1 "Love"

A celebration is taking place in a large square near the Tre Kronor castle to mark the return of Axel Oxenstierna and his son Erik after negotiating a favourable treaty to end the Thirty Years' War. Soldiers, nobles and the common people sing a hymn to peace. Amongst those present are Gabriele de la Gardie, Cristina's favourite, who reflects on his secret love for Maria Eufrosina, Cristina's cousin. Erik is also in love with Maria and makes his feelings clear, much to Maria's distress as she in turn reflects on her love for Gabriele. Oblivious to the way the two lovers are looking at each other, Cristina announces that Maria shall become Erik's bride. Gabriele and Maria express despair at their impending separation.

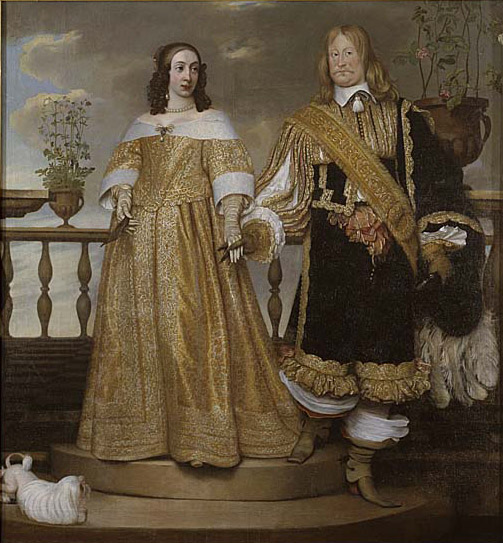
Gabriel De la Gardie and Maria Eufrosyne in a painting by Hendrik Munnichhoven

Alone in his apartments in the castle, Gabriele sings of his love for Maria and his desperation at losing her. Maria enters and throws herself into his arms. He urges her to run away with him, but she reminds him of the loss of honour this would mean and weeps at the hopelessness of their situation. At that moment Cristina enters the room. She asks why Maria is weeping, but before she can answer, Cristina tells her to leave the room. Alone with Gabriele, Cristina tells him of her hopes that they might marry and rule Sweden together but also begins to express doubts about his feelings for her. He attempts to reassure her of his affection.

Part 2 "The wedding"

In a richly decorated chamber in the castle, the wedding of Maria Eufrosina and Erik is about to take place. The courtiers and their ladies sing a paean to Hymenaeus. Gabriele is present as are Arnold Messenius and his son Johan who are secretly plotting to overthrow Cristina. Erik and his father Axel Oxenstjerna wait at the altar. Cristina enters holding Maria's hand. Trembling and pale, Maria announces to all that she cannot go through with the wedding and confesses that she loves another. Cristina angrily demands who it is. Maria falls at her feet and names Gabriele. Amidst general consternation, Cristina launches a furious attack on the lovers and vows that they are destined to live forever apart and that Gabriele will be exiled. Messenius and his son are now sure they will be able to recruit Gabriele to their conspiracy. Cristina imperiously leaves the chamber followed by the heart-broken Erik and his father. Maria faints in the arms of court ladies. Gabriele tries to throw himself at her feet but is dragged off by Messenius and Johan.

=== Act 2 ===
Part 3 "The Conspiracy"

It is a moonlit night on the island in Saltsjön Bay. The Tre Kronor castle can be seen in the distance. Fisherman are heard singing. Carlo Gustavo, Cristina's cousin arrives on the island having heard of the plot to overthrow her. Messenius and his son call the conspirators together and ask Carlo to join them. He is appalled to see Gabriele amongst them and vows to himself that he will foil the plot and save the queen. The conspirators depart for Stockholm to carry out their assault on the castle.

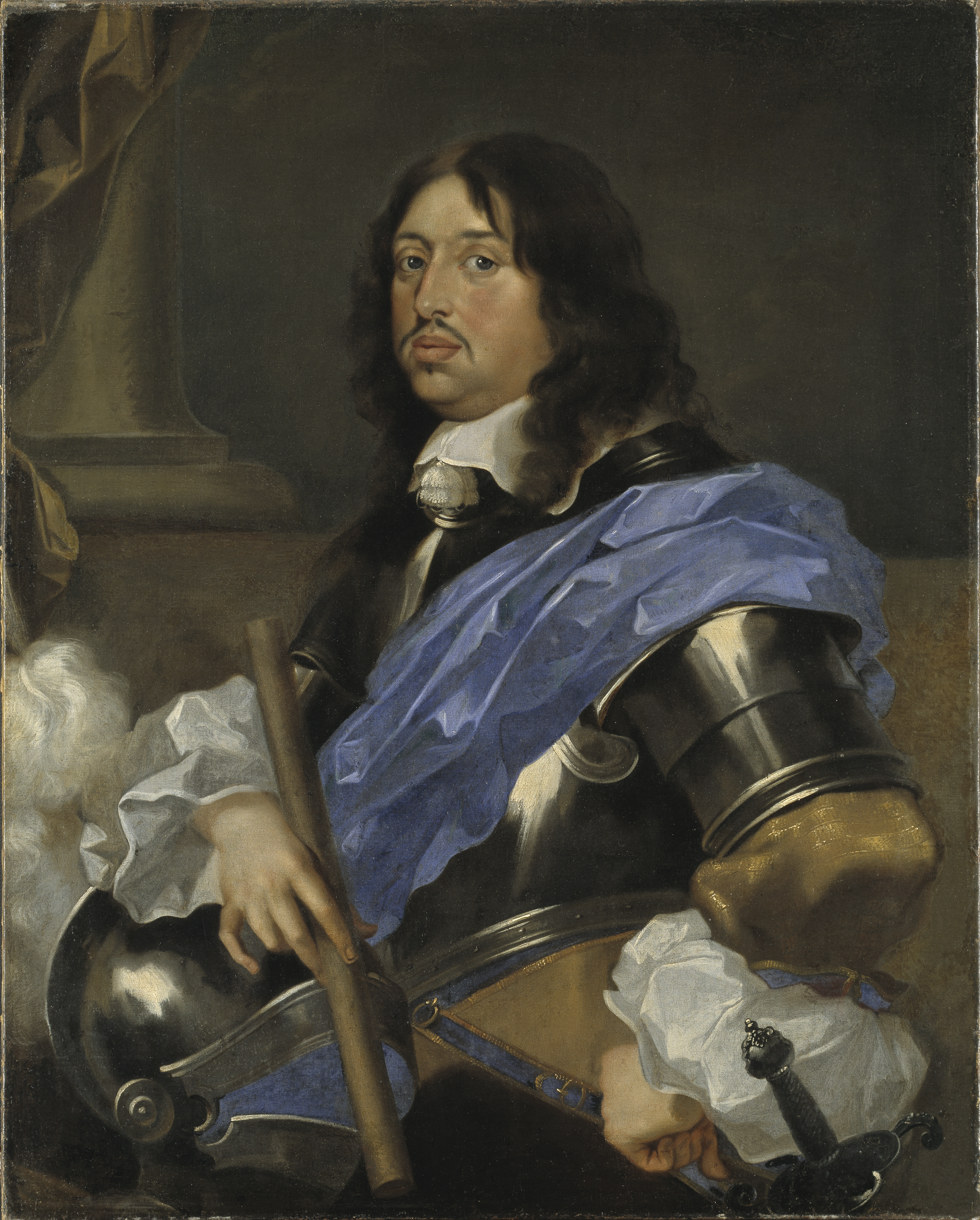
Charles Gustav, Christina's cousin and successor

Part 4 "Disillusion"

Alone in her apartments, Cristina expresses her deep unhappiness over her failed love for Gabriele and the ingratitude of her subjects. Axel Oxenstjerna enters and seeing her weeping tries to comfort her, reminding her of the greatness of her family. He encourages her to accept the love of Carlo Gustavo and continue to reign with him. He also tells her that Erik has renounced his hopes of marrying Maria and bears her no ill-will. However, Cristina becomes almost delirious as she continually expresses her desire to renounce the throne. Suddenly the shouts of the conspirators are heard in the distance.

As the conspirators approach and there are reports of fires, there is much confusion and fear amongst the courtiers. Carlo Gustavo arrives to tell Cristina that he will defend her and quell the rebellion. Eventually, Gabriele, Messenius, Johan, and other conspirators are led into Cristina's presence in chains. On seeing Gabriele she furiously berates him for his treachery and deceit and vows that he will die with the other conspirators. In vain, Maria begs the queen for mercy. Cristina departs for her apartments accompanied by Axel and Erik Oxenstjerna. Carlo Gustavo remains behind to comfort Maria.

=== Act 3 ===
Part 5 "Abdication"

Alone in his house, Carlo Gustavo contemplates Cristina's portrait and reflects on her unhappiness, hoping that the love she once had for him will return. A page arrives to announce that the queen awaits him at dawn. Alone in her rooms, Cristina sits at a desk writing a poem about her desire to give up the throne and live the rest of her life in Italy. As she finishes reading it aloud, Carlo Gustavo enters. She tells him of her plans to abdicate in his favour. He tries to discourage her and reminds her of the love they felt when they were young and his desire to marry her and reign together. She is affectionate but adamant in her refusal and asks him to accompany her to the Grand Council chamber.

In the Grand Council chamber, the senators, presided over by Axel Oxenstjerna, pronounce a death sentence on the conspirators. As the prisoners are about to be led to their execution, the door opens and Cristina enters in her full royal regalia. She is holding both Carlo Gustavo and his sister Maria Eufrosina by the hand. She pronounces her forgiveness of Gabriele and consents to his marriage with Maria. She then announces her abdication in favour of Carlo Gustavo, removes the crown from her head and places it on Carlo who is kneeling before her. She wishes him a long and prosperous reign. The curtain falls as all present pledge their allegiance to the new king.

== Musical numbers ==
=== Act 1 ===
==== Part 1 ====
- No. 1 – Prelude and Hymn to Peace "L'inno levate, o popoli" (Coro)
- No, 2 – Scene and septet "Prendi: da me ricevi" (Oxenstjerna, Cristina, Gabriele, Erik, Maria, Arnold, Johan, Coro)
- No, 3 – Scene and air "Tu che apprendesti all'anima" (Gabriele)
- No. 4 – Scene and duet "L'onor tuo fia puro e santo" (Gabriele, Maria)
- No. 5 – Scena and duet "C'incontrammo... core a core..." (Cristina, Gabriele, Johan)

==== Part 2 ====
- No. 6 – Epithalamium and finale act 1 "Voci ascose dell'aure odorate – Onde tal fremito" (Cristina, Maria, Oxenstjerna, Gabriele, Erik, Arnold, Johan, Coro)

=== Act 2 ===
==== Part 3 ====
- No. 7 – Romance "Voga, voga pescator" (Voice)
- No. 8 – Scene and cavatine "Nacqui alla vita e crebbero" (Gustavo)
- No. 9 – Scene and chorus of conspirators "Secreti ravvolti, nell'ombra tacente" (Arnold, Chorus, Gabriele, Gustavo, Johan)

==== Part 4 ====
- No. 10 – Scene and finale act 2 "Altra fiamma dei Wasa più degna" (Cristina, Oxenstjerna, Chorus, Maria, Gustavo, Erik, Johan, Arnold, Gabriele)

=== Act 3 ===
==== Part 5 ====
- No. 11 – Scene and Air "Quando negli anni giovani" (Gustavo, Page)
- No. 12 – Scena and Duet "Poiché l'avita gloria" (Cristina, Gustavo)
- No. 13 – Chorus of Judges "Nel tempio delle leggi e del rigore" (Chorus, Gabriele, Arnold, Johan)
- No. 14 – Scene and final air "Tu che la patria mia" (Cristina, Gabriel, Arnold, Johan, Maria, Erik, Gustavo, Chorus)
