= Raffaele Scalese =

Italian opera singer

Raffaele Scalese (1800–1884) was an Italian operatic bass who specialized in the opera buffa repertoire. He was active in Italy's major opera houses from the mid-1820s up into the 1860s. He also appeared internationally in opera houses in Austria, Portugal, and France. The last years of his career were spent performing in Paris in the late 1860s where he remained after his retirement from the stage.

== Life and career ==
Born in Naples, Scalese began performing at major Italian opera houses in the mid-1820s, including La Fenice in Venice, the Teatro Valle in Rome, and the Teatro di San Carlo in his native city. In 1827 he portrayed Alterkan in the world premiere of Gaetano Donizetti's Otto mesi in due ore at the Teatro Nuovo in Naples. In 1834 he portrayed Edmondo in the house premiere of Luigi Ricci's Gli esposti at the Teatro d'Angennes in Turin. In 1837 he sang the role of Everardo in the world premiere of Gaetano Rossi's Iginia d'Asti at the Teatro San Benedetto in Venice.

In 1836 Scalese made his debut at La Scala in Milan as Gottofredo in Pietro Antonio Coppola's La festa della rosa. He performed regularly at that house over the next five years. In 1836-1837 he portrayed Don Paparo in Luigi Felice Rossi's Gli avventurieri, Prosdocimo Ficcanaso in Ferdinando Orlandi's La dama soldato, and Taddeo in Gioachino Rossini's L'italiana in Algeri in Milan. In 1838 he was heard at La Scala as Giorgio in Rossini's Torvaldo e Dorliska, Marchese in Coppola's Il Postiglione di Longjumeau, and Tom in Federico Ricci's La prigione di Edimburgo. In 1840 he portrayed Barone di Kelbar in the world premiere of Giuseppe Verdi's Un giorno di regno, Cedrico in Otto Nicolai's Il templario, Sergeant Sulpice in the Italian premiere of Donizetti's La fille du régiment, and the title role in Alessandro Speranza's I due Figaro in Milan. In 1841 he sang the roles of Dr Dulcamara in Gaetano Donizetti's L'elisir d'amore and Ghiringhello in the world premiere of Placido Mandanici's Il buontempone di Porta Ticinese at La Scala. After an 8-year absence from the house, he returned to Milan in 1849 to perform the role of the Marquis de Boisfleury in Donizetti's Linda di Chamounix. He returned to La Scala again in 1854–1855 to sing Basilio in Rossini's The Barber of Seville, a role with which he was closely associated.

In 1840 Scalese was committed to the Teatro Regio di Parma where he performed the roles of Don Bartolo in The Barber of Seville, Dulcamara, Speranza's Figaro, and Rizzardo in Vincenzo Bellini's Beatrice di Tenda. He returned to Parma two years later to sing Belfiore in Donizetti's Alina, regina di Golconda, Dulcamara, Gennaro Malerba in Luigi Ricci's Chi dura vince, He also appeared at the Teatro Comunale di Bologna in 1842 as Belcore in L'elisir d'amore, Gennaro Malerba, Leporello in Luigi Ricci's Il nuovo Figaro, Michelotto in Luigi Ricci's Chiara di Rosemberg, and Volmar in Alina, regina di Golconda. In 1843 he sang the Marquis de Boisfleury at La Fenice. He was heard at the Teatro della Canobbiana in 1848-1849 as Barbarino in Friedrich von Flotow's Alessandro Stradella, Belcore, Figaro in The Barber of Seville, Don Giulio in Donizetti's Don Gregorio, Haly in Rossini's L'italiana in Algeri, Ricci's Leporello, and Volmar.

In 1852 Scalese performed in the world premiere of Federico Ricci's Il marito e l'amante at the Theater am Kärntnertor in Vienna. He sang Don Bartolo in Bologna in 1854 and was also active at opera houses in Rome, Florence, and Venice during the 1850s. He was heard at the Teatro di San Carlo from 1858 to 1860 in a variety of roles, including parts in Errico Petrella's Il folletto di Gresy, Serafino Amedeo De Ferrari's Pipelet, and the world premiere of Luigi Vespoli's La cantante (1858). In 1861-1862 he was committed to the Teatro Nacional de São Carlos in Lisbon. He joined the Théâtre-Italien in Paris in 1866 and remained active as a performer there up into the late 1860s. He died in Paris.
