= Scraps (American magazine) =

19-century American annual satirical magazine

- Categories: Satire
- Frequency: Annually
- Founder: David Claypoole Johnston (1798–1865)
- First issue: 1828; 198 years ago
- Final issue: 1849; 177 years ago
- Country: United States
- Based in: Boston
- Language: English

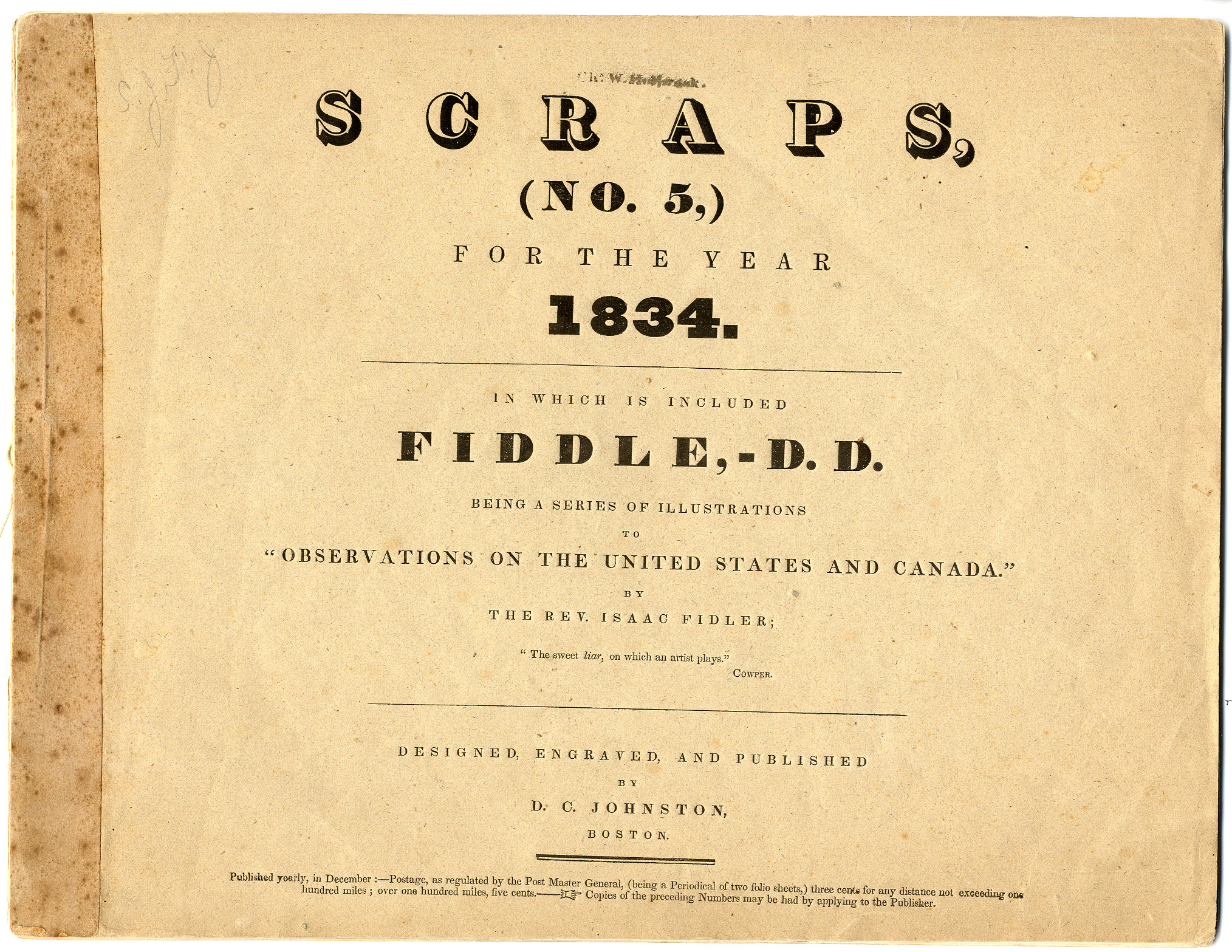

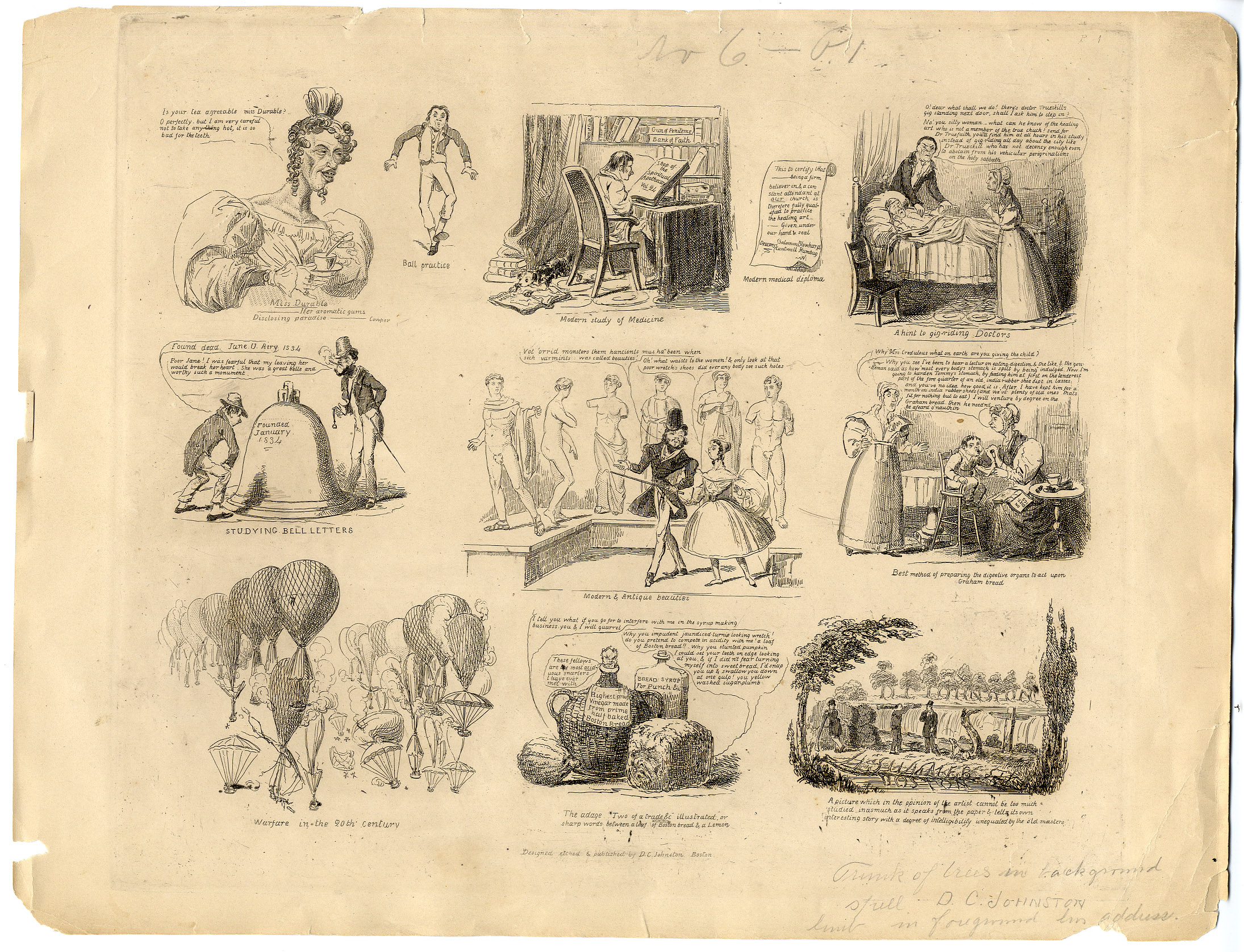

Scraps was an American satirical magazine published annually, initially on December 1 and later on January 1. Started in Boston in 1828 by the erstwhile actor David Claypoole Johnston, it was printed from engraved copper plates and sported four pages of cartoons in each issue. Some issues had alternative titles - such as Trollopania no. 5 for 1834, Fiddle,-D.D. no. 7 Nine numbers of the magazine were published between 1828 and 1849.

Johnston was the first American satirical artist to enjoy widespread popular appeal. He was regarded as the outstanding caricaturist of New England, and was the first American trained on native soil to achieve such a high degree of proficiency in the various disciplines related to lithography, etching, metal plate engraving, and wood engraving. He was raised in Philadelphia, and apprenticed to Francis Kearney from whom he learned the complexities of engraving and etching. His first lithograph appeared in the December 1825 issue of the Boston Monthly Magazine.

Johnston had a strong leaning to lampooning, caricature and satire, and his knowledge of the militia, temperance, religion, and politics, provided ample material and targets for his humour.

He was aware of and inspired by the British caricaturist George Cruikshank's Scraps and Sketches published in 1827, and the similarity of title is not coincidental.
