= Alessandro Speranza =

Italian composer

Alessandro Speranza (1728 - 17 November 1797) was an Italian composer and celebrated contrapuntist. His opera I due Figaro was very popular during his lifetime and enjoyed revivals in Italy after his death well into the 19th century; including at La Scala in 1840 with Raffaele Scalese in the title role.

Speranza taught the composer Niccolò Antonio Zingarelli (1752-1837) who became known for his operas.
