= Peter Rushton Maverick =

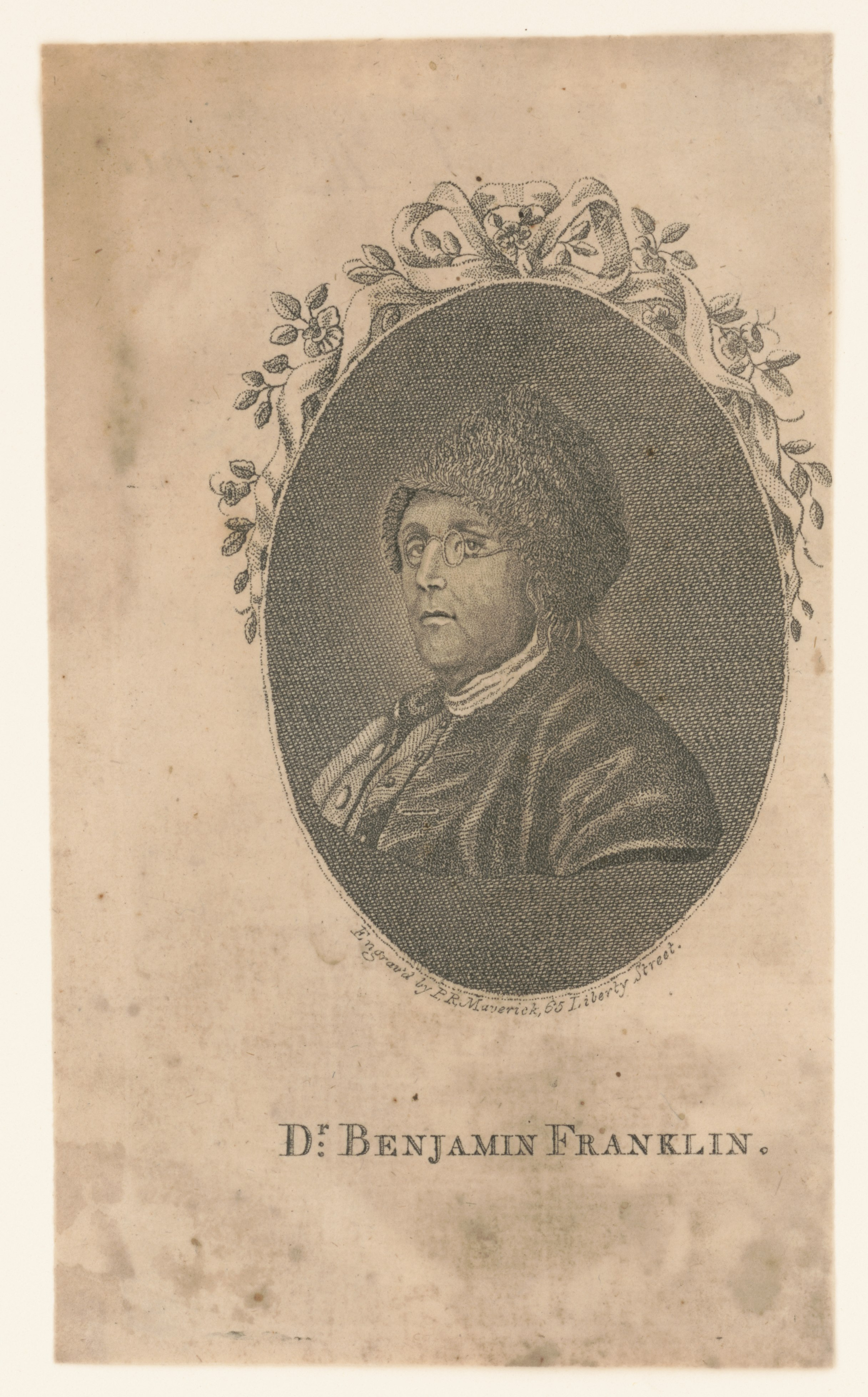
Benjamin Franklin by Peter Rushton Maverick, 1794

Peter Rushton Maverick (April 1, 1755 – December 12, 1811) was an American engraver and silversmith, active in New York City and perhaps Newark, New Jersey. His son, Peter Maverick (1780–1871), also became a well-known printmaker, and his other students included Francis Kearney.

== Early life ==
Maverick is variously reported as being born in England, Cheshire, Connecticut, and New York City. The most concrete evidence, however, makes it clear that he was born in New York City, as the son of Andrew Maverick, who was himself baptized in Boston, and made freeman of New York City on July 17, 1753. The younger Maverick married twice: to Ann Reynolds on July 4, 1772, in New York City, and to Rebecca Reynolds on June 1, 1788, in New York City. In August 1775 he was Ensign in Captain M. Minthorn's company of Colonel John Jay's second regiment of the New York Militia, and on July 23, 1788, represented the Engravers in the New York Federal Procession. He was also a Scottish Rite Mason as a member of both Holland Lodge and Holland Mark Lodge in New York City.

== Career ==
Maverick was probably originally a silversmith in New York City, and advertised in New York and Newark papers as being in the engraving, seal-sinking, and copper-plate engraving business. He engraved bookplates, broadsides and occasional portraits, as well as banknotes. He had a workshop at 65 Liberty Street in New York City. His work is collected in the Newark Public Library and Yale University Art Gallery.

== Death ==
Maverick's date and place of death are also variously reported as either 1807 or 1811, in either New York City or Newark, New Jersey. There is clear evidence, however, that he died on December 12, 1811, in New York City. (The contemporary Newark Centinel of Freedom, 1811, cited by William Dunlap, reports both his birth and death in New York City, with dates specified in this article.)
