= Pierre Desgoutte =

- Pierre Desgoutte (1908)
- Born: February 26, 1874; Saint-Hilaire-sous-Charlieu, Loire, France
- Died: December 10, 1955 (aged 81); Nice, Alpes Maritimes, France
- Occupations: Founder of Cottin & Desgouttes, Engineering
- Spouse(s): Joséphine Curial, Elisabeth Wilhelmine Caroline Nobile de Zenetti
- Children: Georges Desgoutte, Gabriel Desgoutte
- Parent(s): Jean Desgoutte and Marie-Philiberte Plasse

Pierre-Marie-Joseph Desgoutte (February 26, 1874 – December 10, 1955), whose name is sometimes spelled Desgouttes, was a French industrialist, founder of the Automobiles Cottin et Desgouttes company.

== Life ==
Pierre Desgoutte was born at Saint-Hilaire-sous-Charlieu, in the arrondissement of Roanne in the Loire, son of Jean Desgoutte and Marie-Philiberte Plasse.

He started working in the automobile area in 1896, first as a designer with Audibert & Lavirotte, where he designed a number of models, then as an engineer with Berliet.

In 1897, he married a young girl from the Savoie region, Joséphine Curial, with whom he had two sons, Georges (1898) and Gabriel (1900).

In 1904, he launched Desgouttes et Cie, which later became Automobiles Cottin et Desgouttes. (A final "s" was added to the name Desgoutte for marketing reasons.) He personally designed three models: the 12, 16 and 40 hp.

The company was very successful. However, in 1923, Pierre Desgoutte retired from Cottin & Desgouttes, married Elisabeth Wilhelmine Caroline Nobile de Zenetti, of Austrian origin, last descendant of an old Venetian family, and settled in Nice, where he bought a villa that had belonged to the painter Jules Chéret.

Up to his death in Nice in 1955, he continuously demonstrated interest in automobile issues, and he issued patents concerning road and rail transportation shortly before he died.
