= Cottin & Desgouttes =

French automobile manufacturer

Automobiles Cottin & Desgouttes
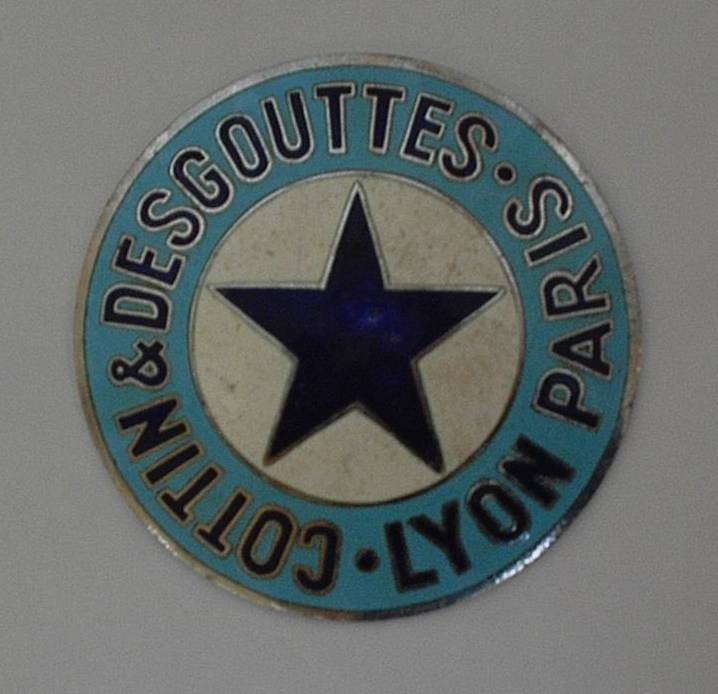
- Industry: Automotive
- Predecessor: Desgouttes & Cie 1904
- Founded: 1906
- Founder: Pierre Desgoutte; Cyrille Cottin
- Defunct: 1933
- Headquarters: Lyon, France
- Area served: Worldwide
- Products: Cars, trucks and coaches

Cottin & Desgouttes was a French automobile manufacturer in the early 20th century.

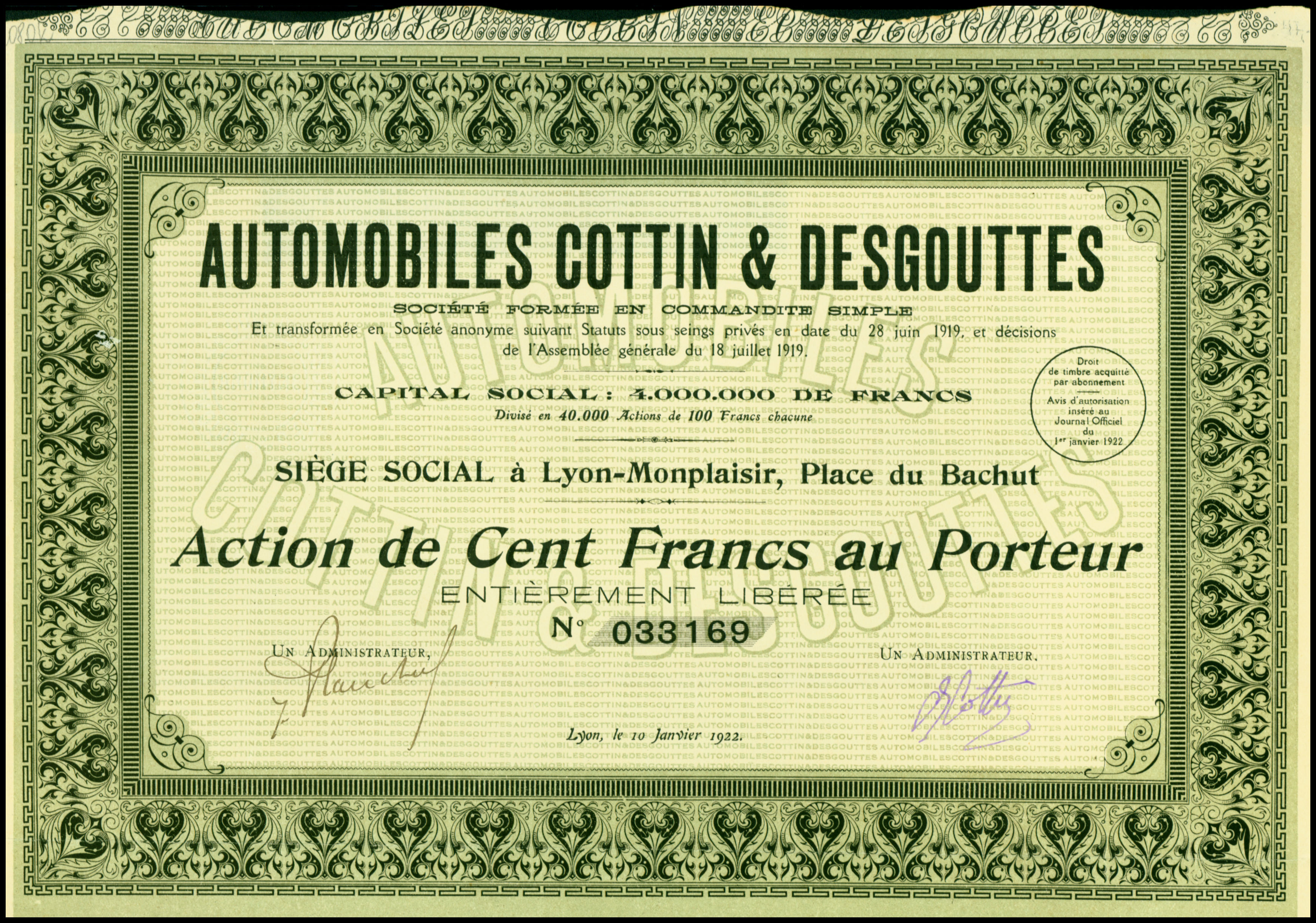
Share of the Automobiles Cottin & Desgouttes, issued 10. January 1922

== History ==
In 1904, Pierre Desgoutte started manufacturing automobiles under the name “Desgouttes & Cie”, in Lyon, France. The first model was the type A, powered by a 9.5-liter, 45 hp, six-cylinder engine. Only two cars of this type were built.

In December 1905, a chassis with a four-cylinder, 24/40 hp engine was presented at the Salon de Paris. It exhibited many innovative features and enjoyed a huge success. At the beginning of 1906, Pierre Desgoutte was joined by a wealthy industrial partner, Cyrille Cottin. They decided to call the new company “Automobiles Cottin & Desgouttes”, Pierre Desgoutte inged Technical Director, whereas Cyrille Cottin wouage Sadles.

The company progressively specialized in luxury and sports models.

Between 1906 and 1914, most of the production was devoted to four-cylinder models. En 1907, the company produced a 2.5 liter, 12 hp model that was so well accepted by the public that it was produced without any major changes for more than four years.

Over the next years, growth was regular and the factories thrived. In 1913, Cottin & Desgouttes could be proud of producing close to 450 cars with a total staff of 300, which was very high at the time, since the usual rule was one car per year per employee.

Well known for the quality of their production, Cottin & Desgouttes was also famous for the interest they demonstrated in “high-tech” solutions: they were among the first manufacturing companies to use a single-block engine, direct drive transmission and universal joint-based transmission.

=== Racing ===
The fame of Cottin & Desgouttes was also due to their participation in a number of car races.

As early as May 1906, a Cottin & Desgouttes car driven by engineer Auguste Fraignac won the Limonest race in its category.

Encouraged by this excellent result, the company decided to participate in more and more important races, from the Press Cup in 1907 (where their car achieved the best gas mileage) to the Grand Prix de France in 1911, in Le Mans, where the specially built model set the lap record before having to abandon due to steering problems.

Cyrille Cottin, a great sportsman himself, drove at a number of races, rallies or other sports events.

=== World War I ===
At the beginning of World War I, the company produced a series of fast Utility Vehicles and delivered several large 36 hp “Torpedoes” to the French Army General Staff. The reliability of the trucks used by the Army was legendary.

During the war, Cottin & Desgouttes also built special engines for tractors. In 1915 the Cottin & Desgouttes factory manufactured aircraft motors for Gnome et Rhône.

=== After the war ===
At the end of the War, Cottin & Desgoutte had well equipped production facilities, and their financial situation was good enough to start again producing luxury cars. Their staff, accustomed to high-quality standards, easily moved from the wartime production back to tourist cars. The manufacturing of trucks was continued.

In addition to the powerful models built immediately after the war, the company launched a smaller, all new and lower priced car in 1922, the type M.

Shortly after this car was presented, Pierre Desgoutte quit the company. Paul Joseph, selected by Cottin to replace him, was charged with building a more powerful and faster car, based on the type M, and aimed at racing. One such car won the Grand Prix du Tourisme de l'Automobile Club de France, which resulted in the launch of the “Grand Prix” model.

Around this time, Cottin & Desgouttes started its first research on aerodynamic profiling; the results of this work were used in the 1925 models, most notably for the 4-seat “boat-torpedo” with its streamlined rear.

In 1925, the company launched the “Sans Secousse”, with Houdaille-type paddle-based shock absorbers and separate springs for the 4 wheels. At the front, the suspension was handled by leaf springs with 2 vertical guide bars supporting the hydraulic shock absorbers; in the rear, it was handled by oscillating semi-trees with double universal joints and 2 overlapping leaf springs.

When the car was presented at the Paris Salon, Gaston Doumergue, President of the French Republic congratulated the Lyon car manufacturer for its historic invention, which would promote the French Automobile Industry. Cottin reportedly replied that the government had contributed to this invention - by the very bad quality of the roads. The Sans-Secousse was also very successful outside France.

In 1930, the first Saharan Tourist Car Rally was won by four “Sans Secousse” cars that demonstrated a high level of durability. These cars were 14 hp sport roadsters, with no wings or other useless accessories, yielding a high weight to power ratio, separate springs in front and four leaf springs at the rear, with a de Dion-type bridge; they could drive very fast even on low quality dirt roads.

=== Twilight ===
In spite of all these achievements, the company was yet another victim of the 1930s crisis. A “Sans Secousse” cost twice the price of a six-cylinder Citroën.

The last car built by Cottin & Desgouttes was much more conventional, powered by a lateral 3.8-liter, six-cylinder engine.

Production stopped in 1931. In 1933, the last Cottin & Desgouttes, assembled with stock parts, were sold.

In 1968, the 1911 Grand Prix car was used in the opening race sequence of the film Chitty Chitty Bang Bang, driven by its then owner, John 'Jumbo' Goddard.

== Gallery ==
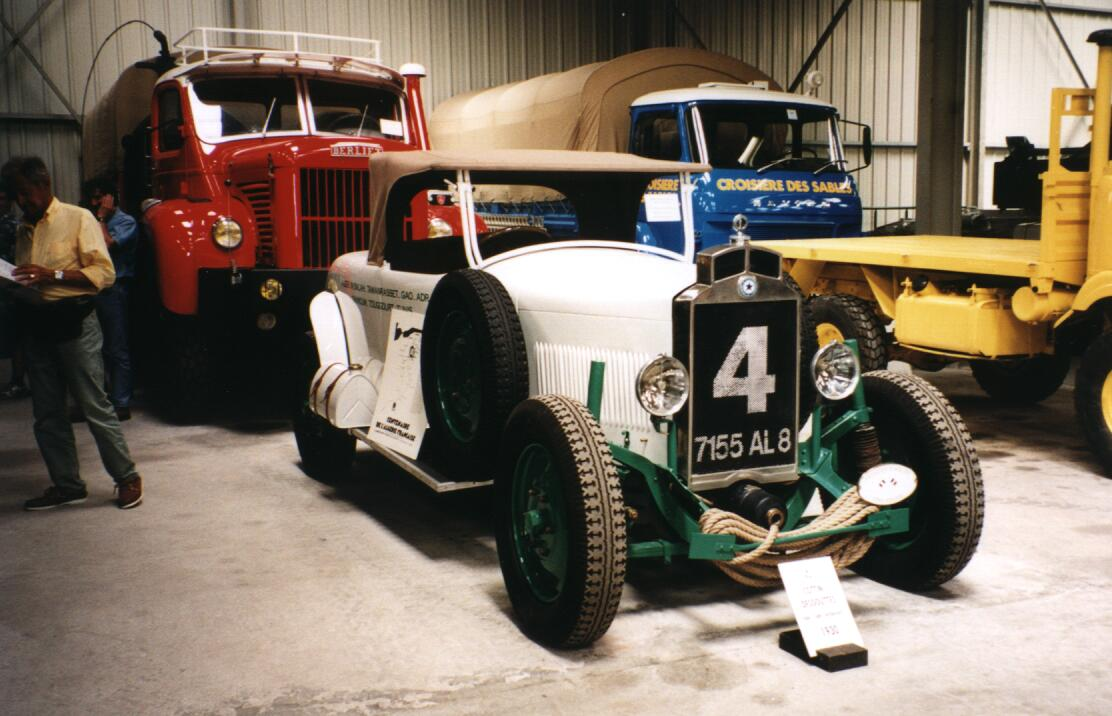
A Cottin & Desgouttes from the Sahara Race(restored by Fondation Berliet)

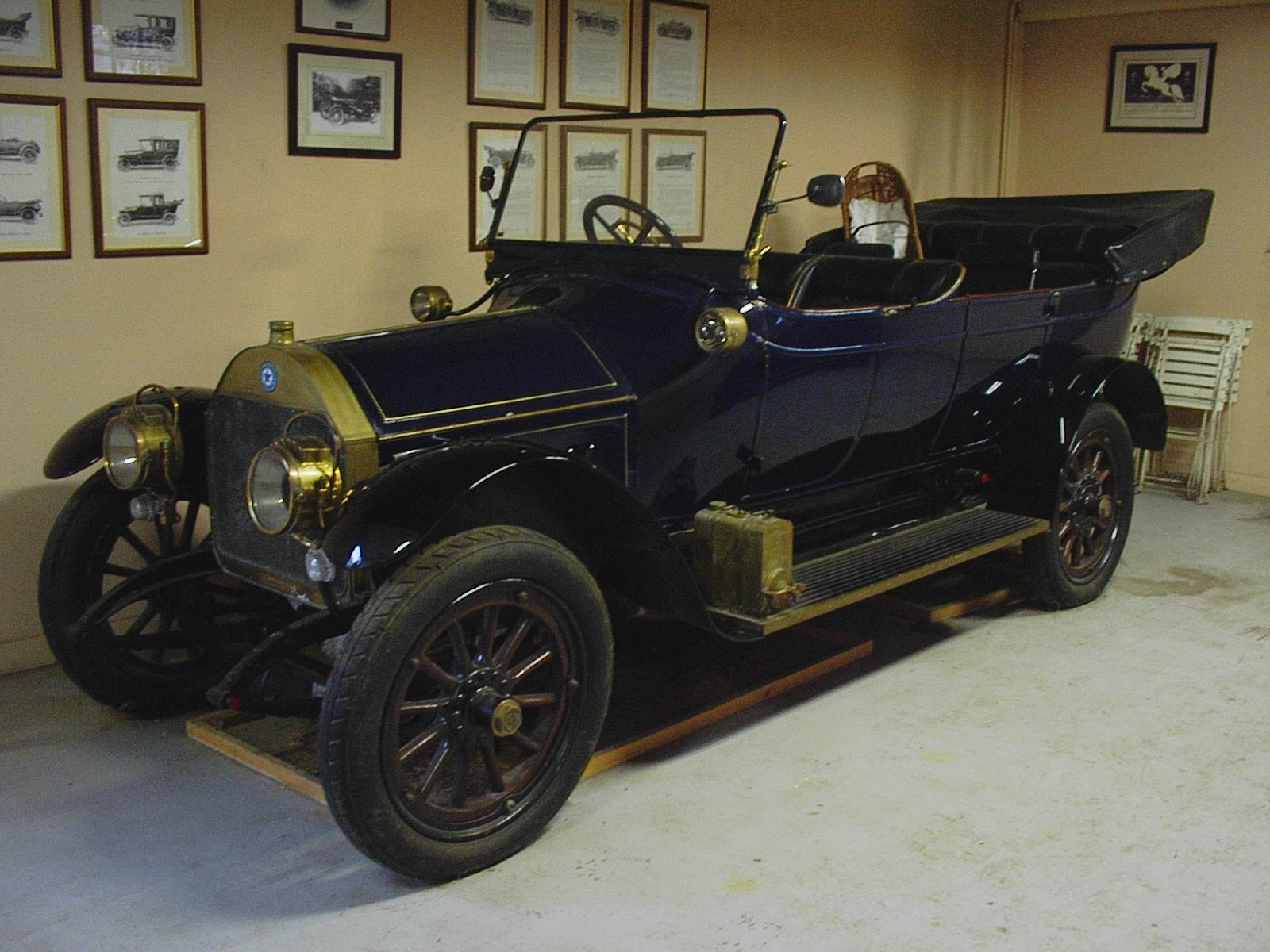
A Cottin & Desgouttes

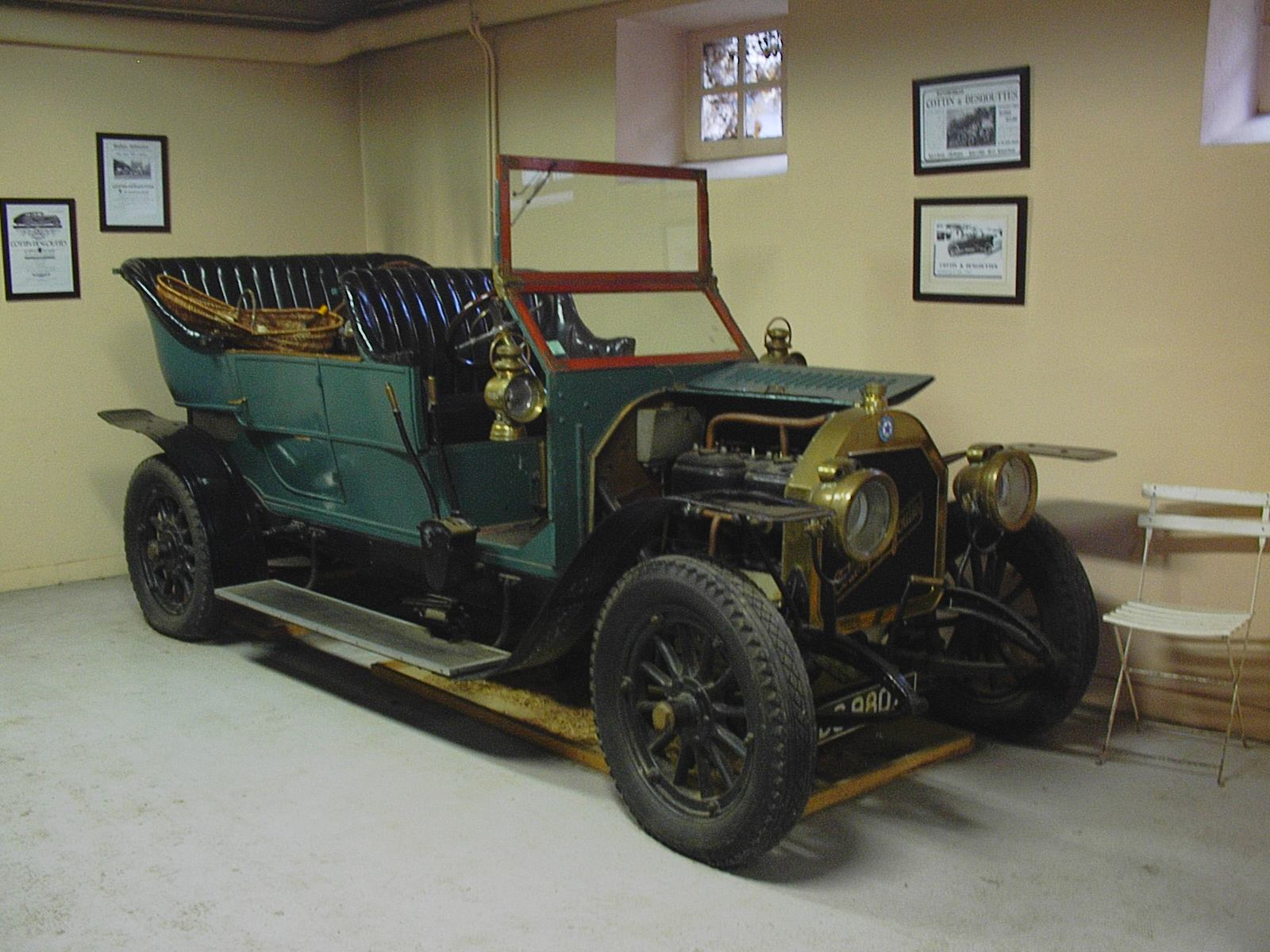
Another Cottin & Desgouttes

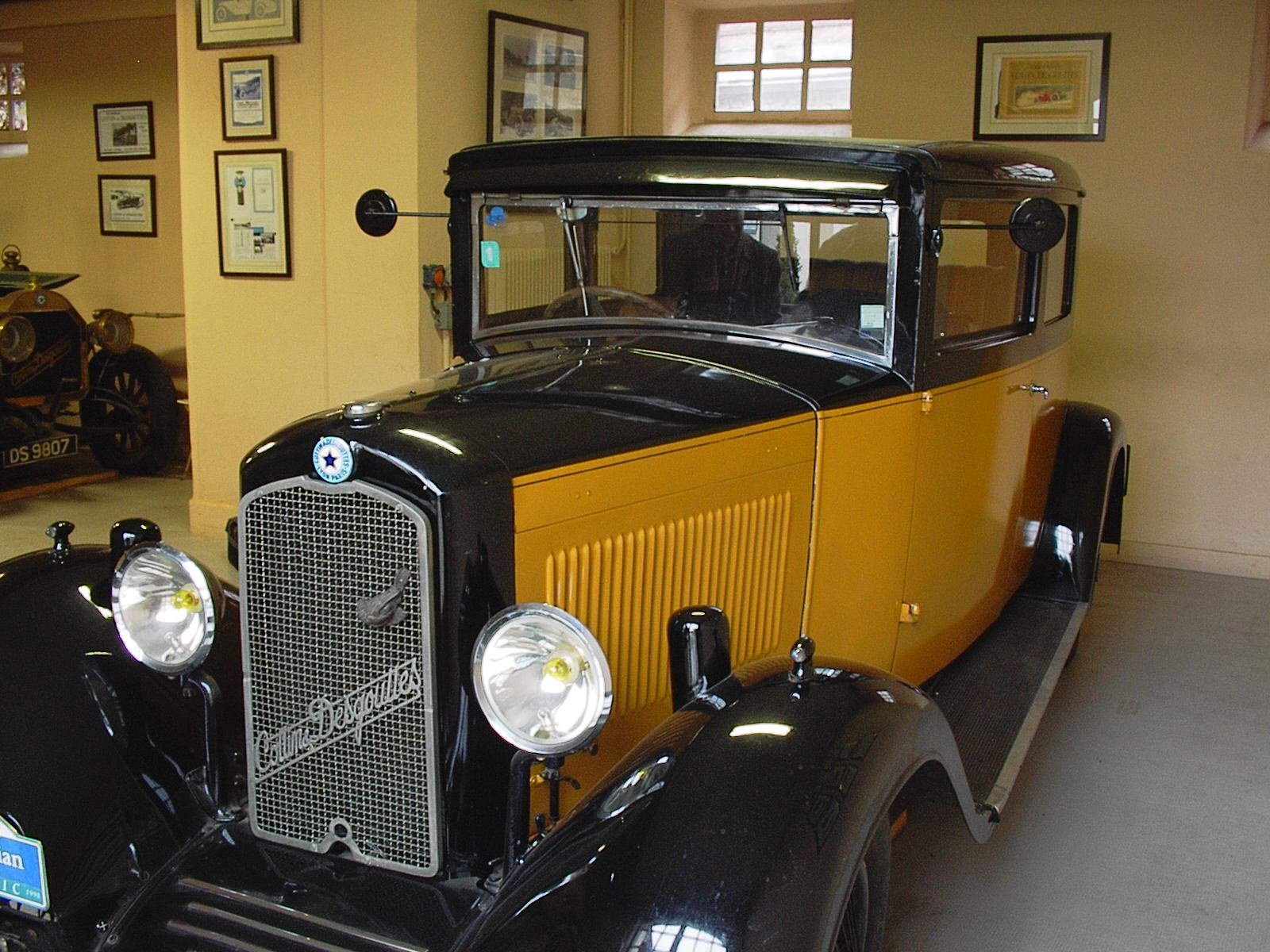
A Cottin & Desgouttes "Sans-Secousses"

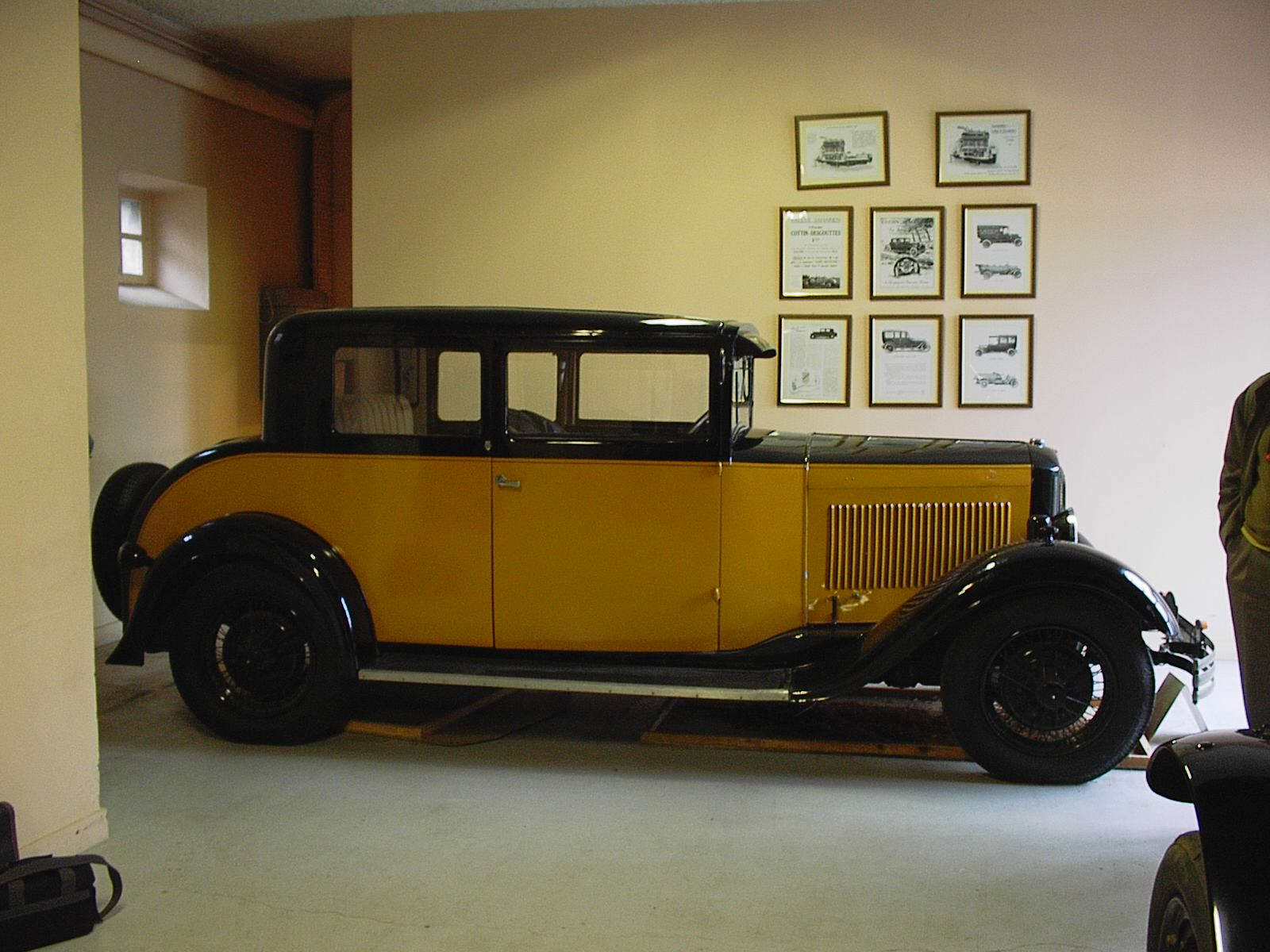
Other view of the "Sans-Secousses"

== Bibliography ==
- The Beaulieu Encyclopedia of the Automobile
- G.N. Georgano, The complete encyclopedia of motorcars, 1885 to the present
- Automobile Encyclopedia, Gründ.
- Rob de la Rive Box, The Complete Encyclopedia of Antique Cars - Sport & Passenger Cars 1886 - 1940, 1998
- Grande encyclopédie de l'automobile, Alpha Auto, Grange Batelière, Paris.
- Francis Reyes, Camions de légende, Massin 1992.
- Pierre Lucien Pouzet, Les voitures Rhône-Alpines dans les compétitions jusqu'en 1914, Cahiers Techniques de la Fondation de l'Automobile Marius Berliet.
- La Sans-Secousses de Cottin-Desgouttes, Cahiers Techniques de la Fondation de l'Automobile Marius Berliet.
- La pénétration automobile au Sahara, Cahiers Techniques de la Fondation de l'Automobile Marius Berliet.
