= Elizabeth Ritchie =

British Methodist biographer (1754–1835)

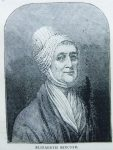
- Born: 2 February 1754; Otley, England
- Died: 9 April 1835 (aged 81); London, England

Elizabeth Ritchie or Elizabeth Mortimer (2 February 1754 – 9 April 1835) was a British Methodist biographer. She is noted for caring for John Wesley and writing about his final days.

== Life ==
Ritchie was born into a Methodist family in Otley. Her mother was Beatrice (born Robinson) and her father, John Ritchie was a retired Scottish naval surgeon. She was their second child. Her father continued as a surgeon in Wharfedale in Yorkshire where he had married her mother. Her family were strict Methodists and John Wesley stayed at their house. When she was twelve she went to say with a "Mrs H" and there she enjoyed attending Church of England services. She rebelled against Methodism and even after her return home she continued to not be a Methodist. In June 1772 she reestablished her friendship with John Wesley and by 1774 she was leading classes.

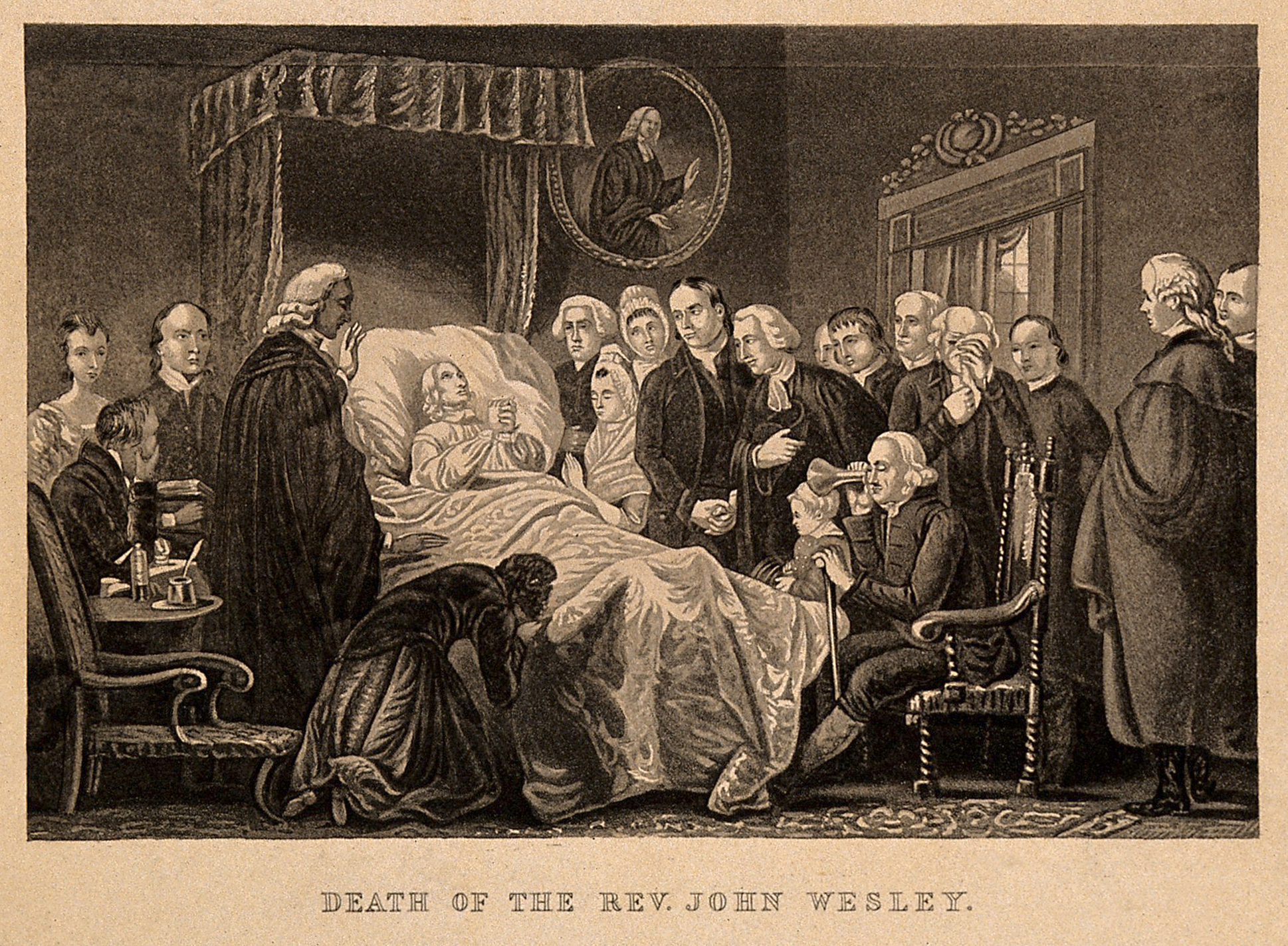
Wesley on his deathbed: "The best of all is, God is with us". Mezzotint by John Sartain.

John Wesley was cared for by Hester Ann Rogers but the tasks were onerous and Rogers was not young. Ritchie moved into John Wesley's house in November 1790 when he had already lost much of his sight. She would read to him from 5:30 in the morning. She wrote his last letter which was to Wilberforce concerning slavery in America. Wesley would occasionally sing and one of his last trips was to visit a man who had recently been widowed. Wesley did not know the man but he went because he was asked to.

She was there on his final day when he said his final "Farewell". As he had requested they sang after his death and Ritchie requested that they pray. Wesley's physician, John Whitehead, requested that Ritchie should write an account of his final days.

Whitehead read from Richie's account at his funeral and her short work was published.

Ritchie died in London in 1835.
