= Francis Kearney =

American engraver and lithographer

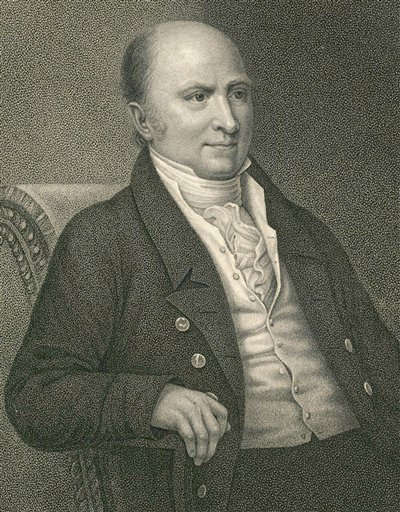

Francis Kearney (July 23, 1785 - September 1, 1837), a.k.a. Francis Kearny, was an American engraver and lithographer, active in Philadelphia and New York. He was born and died in Perth Amboy, New Jersey, and studied under Peter Rushton Maverick.
