= Sophie Ristaud Cottin =

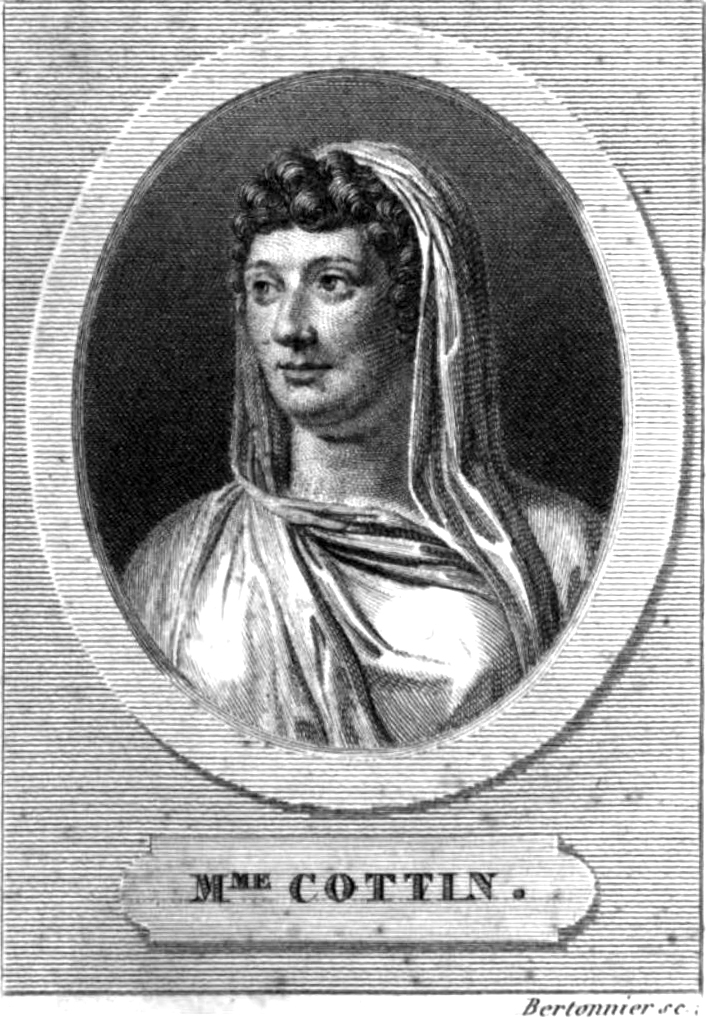
Sophie Ristaud Cottin by Pierre-François Bertonnier (1791–1858)

Sophie Ristaud Cottin (22 March 1770 – 25 August 1807) was a French writer and novelist whose works became popular during the 19th century and were translated into several languages. Born in Paris, she later became known for her sentimental novels, which often explored themes of love, passion, virtue, suffering, and religious feeling. Her writing has been associated with pre-Romanticism.

Cottin published several successful novels, including Claire d'Albe (1799), Malvina (1801), Amélie Mansfield (1803), Mathilde (1805), and Élisabeth ou les Exilés de Sibérie (1806). Her novels achieved considerable popularity beyond France, contributing to her reputation as an important French novelist of the period. Élisabeth ou les Exilés de Sibérie, in particular, became one of her best-known works.

Following the death of her husband, Cottin devoted herself increasingly to literature. She died on 25 August 1807 at the age of 37. A collection of her works was subsequently published in several volumes during the 19th century, helping to preserve and circulate her writings.

== Biography ==
Marie Sophie Ristaud (sometimes spelt Risteau) was born in March 1770 at Tonneins. She was not yet twenty when she married her first husband, Jean-Paul-Marie Cottin, a banker. She wrote several romantic and historical novels including Elizabeth; or, the Exiles of Siberia (Elisabeth ou les Exilés de Sibérie 1806), a "wildly romantic but irreproachably moral tale", according to Nuttall's Encyclopaedia. She also published Claire d'Albe (1799), Malvina (1801), Amélie de Mansfield (1803), Mathilde (1805), set in the crusades, and a prose-poem, La Prise de Jéricho. Her writing became more important to her after her first husband died when she was in her early twenties. She went to live with a cousin and her three children at Champlan (Seine-et-Oise) but died at the age of 37 in Paris on 25 August 1807.

== Legacy ==
In Les Misérables (1862), Victor Hugo writes "Madame Cottin was declared the foremost writer of the age" [madame Cottin était déclarée le premier écrivain de l’époque] as part of a panorama of tastes and events typifying the atmosphere of the year 1817.

== List of works ==
- Claire d'Albe (1799)
- Malvina (1800)
- Amélie Mansfield (1802)
  - English translation : Amelia Mansfield : a novel (1809)
- Mathilde (1805)
- Élisabeth ou Les exilés de Sibérie (1806)
