= New Harmony, Indiana =

American town founded in 1814

- Town
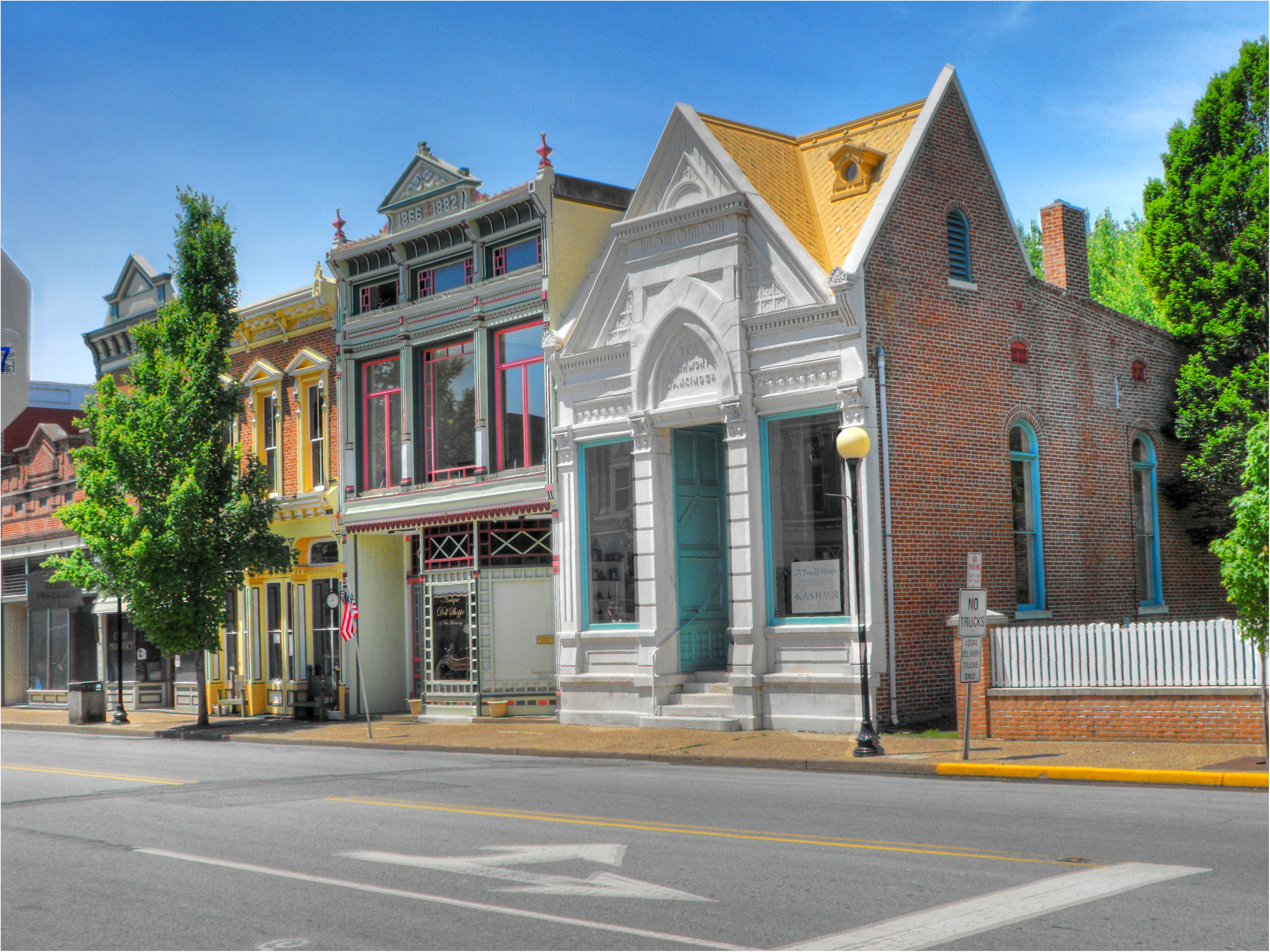
- Downtown New Harmony

- Seal

- Location of New Harmony in Posey County, Indiana.
- Coordinates: 38°7′44″N 87°55′49″W
- Country: United States
- State: Indiana
- County: Posey
- Township: Harmony
- Established: 1814

Area
  - Total: 0.82 sq mi (2.13 km^{2})
  - Land: 0.81 sq mi (2.11 km^{2})
  - Water: 0.0077 sq mi (0.02 km^{2})
- Elevation: 377 ft (115 m)

Population (2020)
  - Total: 690
  - Density: 924.2/sq mi (356.82/km^{2})
- Time zone: UTC-6 (CST)
  - Summer (DST): UTC-5 (CDT)
- ZIP code: 47631
- Area code: 812
- FIPS code: 18-52974
- GNIS feature ID: 2396802
- Website: www.in.gov/towns/newharmony/

New Harmony is a historic town on the Wabash River in Harmony Township, Posey County, Indiana, United States. It lies 15 miles (24 km) north of Mount Vernon, the county seat, and is part of the Evansville metropolitan area. The town's population was 690 at the 2020 census.

Established by the Harmony Society in 1814 under the leadership of George Rapp, the town was originally named Harmony (also called Harmonie, or New Harmony). In its early years the 20,000-acre (8,100 ha) settlement was the home of Lutherans who had separated from their church in the Duchy of Württemberg and immigrated to the United States. The Harmonists built a town in the wilderness, but in 1824 they decided to sell their property and return to Pennsylvania. Robert Owen, a Welsh industrialist and social reformer, purchased the town in 1825 in order to create a utopian community, but it lasted only a few years.

Town residents established the state's first public library, a civic drama club, and a public school system open to men and women. Its prominent citizens included Owen's sons: Robert Dale Owen, an Indiana congressman and social reformer who sponsored legislation to create the Smithsonian Institution; David Dale Owen, a state and federal geologist; William Owen, a New Harmony businessman; and Richard Owen, Indiana state geologist, Indiana University professor, and first president of Purdue University. The town also served as the second headquarters of the U.S. Geological Survey. Numerous scientists and educators contributed to New Harmony's intellectual community, including William Maclure, Marie Louise Duclos Fretageot, Thomas Say, Charles-Alexandre Lesueur, Joseph Neef, Frances Wright, and others.

Many of the town's old Harmonist buildings have been restored. These structures, along with others related to the Owenite community, are included in the New Harmony Historic District. Contemporary additions to the town include the Roofless Church and Atheneum. The New Harmony State Memorial is located south of town on State Road 69 in Harmonie State Park.

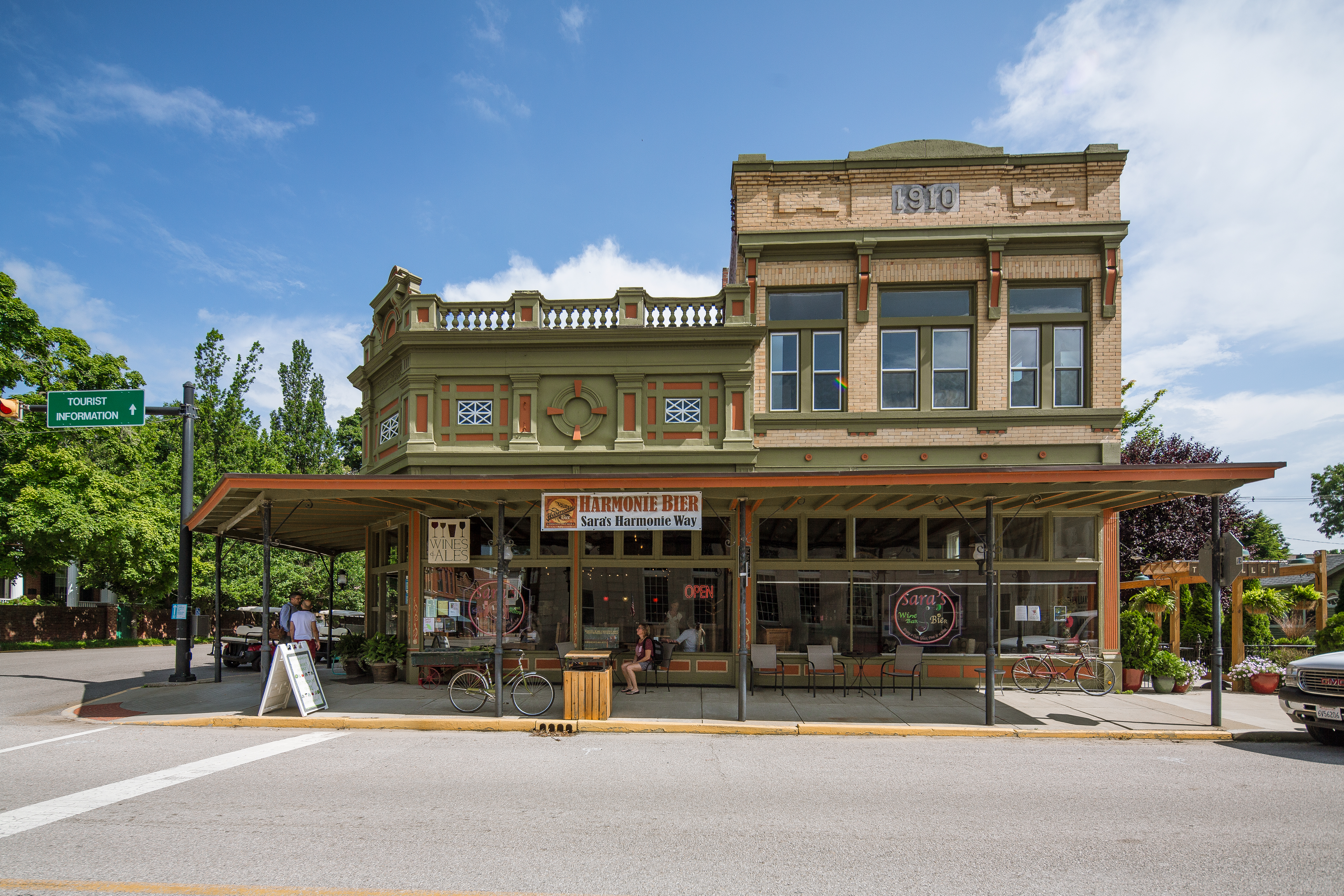
Photo from Small Town Indiana photo survey

== History ==
=== Harmonist settlement (1814–1824) ===
The town of Harmony was founded by Harmony Burton in 1814 under the leadership of German immigrant George Rapp (born Johann Georg Rapp). It was the second of three towns built by the pietist, communal religious group, known as Harmonists, Harmonites, or Rappites. The Harmonists settled in the Indiana Territory after leaving Harmony, Pennsylvania, where westward expansion, the area's rising population, jealous neighbors, and the increasing cost of land threatened the Society's desire for isolation.

In April 1814 Anna Mayrisch, John L. Baker, and Ludwick Shirver (Ludwig Schreiber) traveled west in search of a new location for their congregation, one that would have fertile soil and access to a navigable waterway. By May 10 the men had found suitable land along the Wabash River in the Indiana Territory and made an initial purchase of approximately 7,000 acres (28 km^{2}). Rapp wrote on May 10, "The place is 25 miles from the Ohio mouth of the Wabash, and 12 miles from where the Ohio makes its curve first before the mouth. The town will be located about 1/4 mile from the river above on the channel on a plane as level as the floor of a room, perhaps a good quarter mile from the hill which lies suitable for a vineyard." Although Rapp expressed concern that the town's location lacked a waterworks, the area provided an opportunity for expansion and access to markets through the nearby rivers, causing him to remark, "In short, the place has all the advantages which one could wish, if a steam engine meanwhile supplies what is lacking."

The first Harmonists left Pennsylvania in June 1814 and traveled by flatboat to their new land in the Indiana Territory. In May 1815 the last of the Harmonists who had remained behind until the sale of their town in Pennsylvania was completed departed for their new town along the Wabash River. Frederick Reichert Rapp, George Rapp's adopted son, drew up the town plan for their new village at Harmony, Indiana, which surveyors laid out on August 8, 1814. By 1816, the same year that Indiana became a state, the Harmonists had acquired 20,000 acres (81 km^{2}) of land, built 160 homes and other buildings, and cleared 2,000 acres (8.1 km^{2}) for their new town. The settlement also began to attract new arrivals, including emigrants from Germany such as members of Rapp's congregation from Württemberg, many of whom expected the Harmonists to pay for their passage to America. However, the new arrivals "were more of a liability than an asset". On March 20, 1819, Rapp commented, "It is astonishing how much trouble the people who have arrived here have made, for they have no morals and do not know what it means to live a moral and well-mannered life, not to speak of true Christianity, of denying the world or yourself."

Visitors to Harmony commented on the commercial and industrial work being done in this religious settlement along the Wabash River. "It seemed as though I found myself in the midst of Germany," noted one visitor. In 1819 the town had a steam-operated wool carding and spinning factory, a horse-drawn and human-powered threshing machine, a brewery, distillery, vineyards, and a winery. The property included an orderly town, "laid out in a square", with a church, school, store, dwellings for residents, and streets to create "the most beautiful city of western America, because everything is built in the most perfect symmetry". Other visitors were not as impressed: "hard labor & coarse fare appears to be the lot of all except the family of Rapp, he lives in a large & handsome brick house while the rest inhabit small log cabins. How so numerous a population are kept quietly & tamely in absolute servitude it is hard to conceive—the women I believe do more labor in the field than the men, as large numbers of the latter are engaged in different branches of manufactures." Although they were not paid for their work, the 1820 manufacturer's census reported that 75 men, 12 women, and 30 children were employed, in the Society's tanneries, saw and grain mills, and woolen and cotton mills. Manufactured goods included cotton, flannel, and wool cloth, yarn, knit goods, tin ware, rope, beer, peach brandy, whiskey, wine, wagons, carts, plows, flour, beef, pork, butter, leather, and leather goods.

The Harmonist community continued to thrive during the 1820s, but correspondence from March 6, 1824, between Rapp and his adopted son, Frederick, indicates that the Harmonists planned to sell their Indiana property and were already looking for a new location. In May, a decade after their arrival in Indiana, the Harmonists purchased land along the Ohio River eighteen miles from Pittsburgh, Pennsylvania, and were making arrangements to advertise the sale of their property in Indiana. The move, although it was made primarily for religious reasons, would provide the Harmonists with easier access to eastern markets and a place where they could live more peacefully with others who shared their German language and culture. On May 24, 1824, a group of Harmonists boarded a steamboat and departed Indiana, bound for Pennsylvania, where they founded the community of Economy, the present-day town of Ambridge. In May 1825 the last Harmonists left Indiana after the sale of their 20,000 acres (81 km^{2}) of property, which included the land and buildings, to Robert Owen for $150,000. Owen hoped to establish a new community on the Indiana frontier, one that would serve as a model community for communal living and social reform.

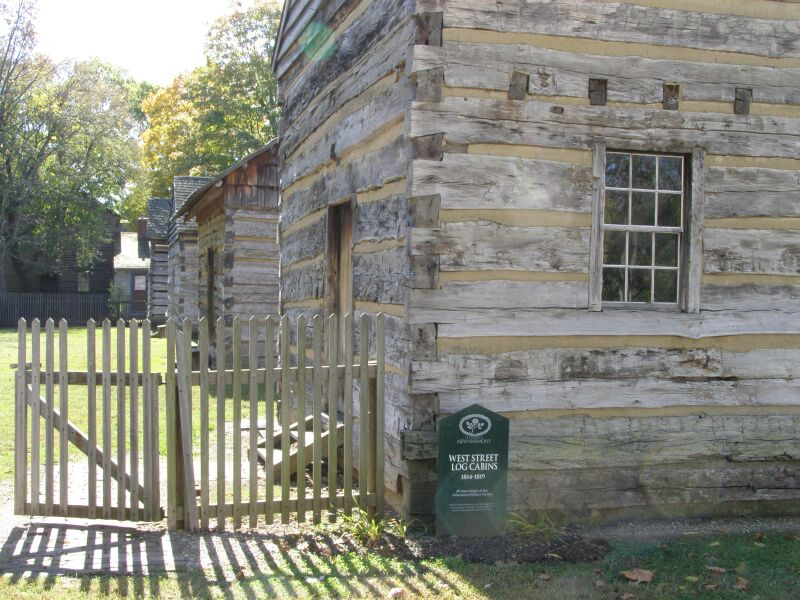
West Street Log Cabins

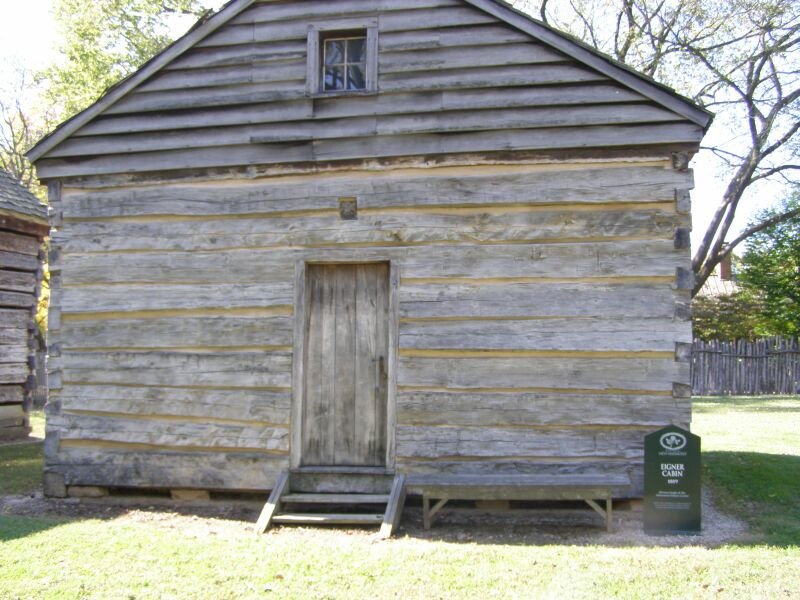
Eigner Cabin

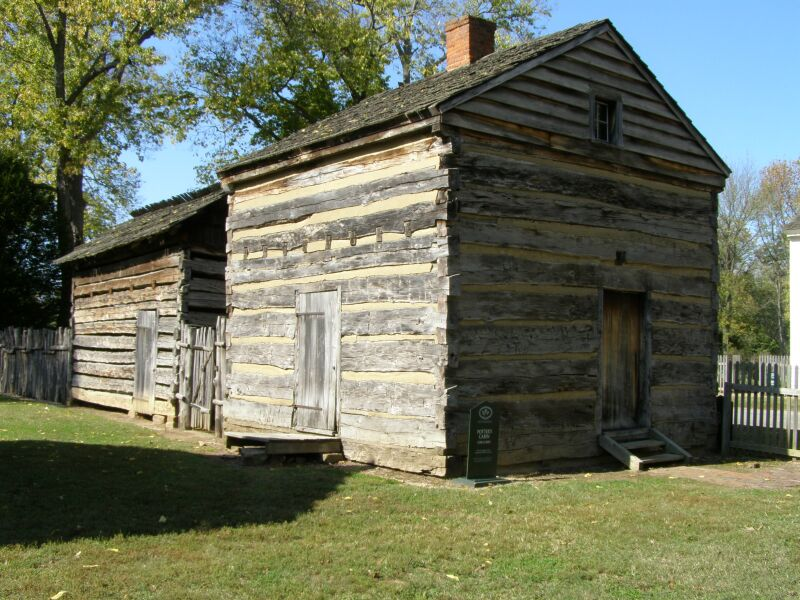
Potter Cabin

=== Owen community (1825–1827) ===
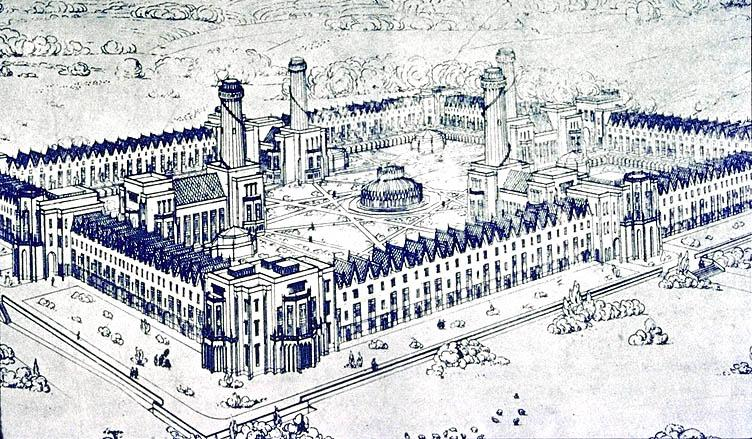
New Harmony as envisioned by Owen

Robert Owen was a social reformer and wealthy industrialist who made his fortune from textile mills in New Lanark, Scotland. Owen, his twenty-two-year-old son, William, and his Scottish friend Donald McDonald sailed to the United States in 1824 to purchase a site to implement Owen's vision for "a New Moral World" of happiness, enlightenment, and prosperity through education, science, technology, and communal living. Owen believed his utopian community would create a "superior social, intellectual and physical environment" based on his ideals of social reform. Owen was motivated to buy the town in order to prove his theories were viable and to correct the troubles that were affecting his mill-town community New Lanark. The ready-built town of Harmony, Indiana, fitted Owen's needs. In January 1825 he signed the agreement to purchase the town and renamed it the New Harmony Community of Equality.

Owen invited "any and all" to join the settlement. While many of the town's new arrivals had a sincere interest in making it a success, the experiment also attracted "crackpots, free-loaders, and adventurers whose presence in the town made success unlikely." William Owen, who remained in New Harmony while his father returned east to recruit new residents, also expressed concern in his diary entry, dated March 24, 1825: "I doubt whether those who have been comfortable and content in their old mode of life, will find an increase of enjoyment when they come here. How long it will require to accustom themselves to their new mode of living, I am unable to determine."

When Robert Owen returned to New Harmony in April 1825, he found seven to eight hundred residents and a "chaotic" situation, much in need of leadership. By May 1825 the community had adopted the "Constitution of the Preliminary Society," which loosely outlined its expectations and government. Under the preliminary constitution, members would provide their own household goods and invest their capital at interest in an enterprise that would promote independence and social equality. Members would render services to the community in exchange for credit at the town's store, but those who did not want to work could purchase credit at the store with cash payments made in advance. In addition, the town would be governed by a committee of four members chosen by Owen and the community would elect three additional members.

In June, Robert Owen left William in New Harmony while he traveled east to continue promoting his model community and returned to Scotland, where he sold his interests in the New Lanark textile mills and arranged financial support for his wife and two daughters, who chose to remain in Scotland. Owen's four sons, Robert Dale, William, David Dale, and Richard, and a daughter, Jane Dale, later settled in New Harmony.

While Owen was away recruiting new residents for New Harmony, factors began to lead to a breakup of the socialist settlement. Members grumbled about inequity in credits between workers and non-workers. In addition, the town soon became overcrowded, lacked sufficient housing, and was unable to produce enough to become self-sufficient, although they still had "high hopes for the future." Owen spent only a few months at New Harmony, where a shortage of skilled craftsmen and laborers along with inadequate and inexperienced supervision and management contributed to its eventual failure.

Despite the community's shortcomings, Owen was a passionate promoter of his vision for New Harmony. While visiting Philadelphia, Owen met Marie Louise Duclos Fretageot, a Pestalozzian educator, and persuaded her to join him in Indiana. Fretageot encouraged William Maclure, a scientist and fellow educator, to become a part of the venture. (Maclure became Owen's financial partner.) On January 26, 1826, Fretegeot, Maclure, and a number of their colleagues, including Thomas Say, Josef Neef, Charles-Alexandre Lesueur, and others aboard the keelboat Philanthropist (also called the "Boatload of Knowledge"), arrived in New Harmony to help Owen establish his new experiment in socialism.

On February 5, 1826, the town adopted a new constitution, "The New Harmony Community of Equality", whose objective was to achieve happiness based on principles of equal rights and equality of duties. Cooperation, common property, economic benefit, freedom of speech and action, kindness and courtesy, order, preservation of health, acquisition of knowledge, and obedience to the country's laws were included as part of the constitution. The constitution laid out the life of a citizen in New Harmony based on age. Children from the age of one to five were to be cared for and encouraged to exercise; children aged six to nine were to be lightly employed and given education via observation directed by skilled teachers. Youth from the ages of ten to twelve were to help in the houses and with the gardening. Teenagers from the age of twelve to fifteen were to receive technical training, and from fifteen to twenty their education was to be continued. Young adults from the ages of twenty to thirty were to act as a superintendent in the production and education departments. Adults from the ages of thirty to forty were to govern the homes, and residents aged forty to sixty were to be encouraged to assist with the community's external relations or to travel abroad if they so desired.

Although the constitution contained worthy ideals, it did not clearly address how the community would function and was never fully established. Individualist anarchist Josiah Warren, who was one of the original participants in the New Harmony Society, asserted that the community was doomed to failure due to a lack of individual sovereignty and private property. He commented: "It seemed that the difference of opinion, tastes and purposes increased just in proportion to the demand for conformity. Two years were worn out in this way; at the end of which, I believe that not more than three persons had the least hope of success. Most of the experimenters left in despair of all reforms, and conservatism felt itself confirmed. We had tried every conceivable form of organization and government. We had a world in miniature. --we had enacted the French revolution over again with despairing hearts instead of corpses as a result. ...It appeared that it was nature's own inherent law of diversity that had conquered us ...our 'united interests' were directly at war with the individualities of persons and circumstances and the instinct of self-preservation... and it was evident that just in proportion to the contact of persons or interests, so are concessions and compromises indispensable." (Periodical Letter II 1856).

Part of New Harmony's failings stemmed from three activities that Owen brought from Scotland to America. First, Owen actively attacked established religion, despite United States' constitutional guarantees of religious freedom and the separations of church and state. Second, Owen remained stubbornly attached to the principles of the rationalist Age of Enlightenment, which drove away many of the Jeffersonian farmers Owen tried to attract. Thirdly, Owen consistently appealed to the upper class for donations, but found that the strategy was not as effective as it had been in Europe.

Robert Dale Owen wrote that the members of the failed socialist experiment at New Harmony were "a heterogeneous collection of radicals, enthusiastic devotees to principle, honest latitudinarians, and lazy theorists, with a sprinkling of unprincipled sharpers thrown in," and that "a plan which remunerates all alike, will, in the present condition of society, ultimately eliminate from a co-operative association the skilled, efficient and industrious members, leaving an ineffective and sluggish residue, in whose hands the experiment will fail, both socially and pecuniarily." However, he still thought that "co-operation is a chief agency destined to quiet the clamorous conflicts between capital and labour; but then it must be co-operation gradually introduced, prudently managed, as now in England." In 1826 splinter groups dissatisfied with the efforts of the larger community broke away from the main group and prompted a reorganization.

In New Harmony, work was divided into six departments, each with its own superintendent. These departments included agriculture, manufacturing, domestic economy, general economy, commerce, and literature, science and education. A governing council included the six superintendents and an elected secretary. Despite the new organization and constitution, members continued to leave town.

Disagreements mushroomed, and it was eventually decided to divide the settlement into four different societies with money used to trade between them. By March 1827, after several other attempts to reorganize, the Owenite social experiment was considered a failure. Those who wanted to continue the scheme leased some of the land, and smaller communities were formed from the wreckage. The smaller communities had further disputes. Individualism replaced socialism in 1828, and New Harmony was dissolved in 1829 amid constant quarrels. The town's parcels of land and property were returned to private use. Owen spent $200,000 of his own funds to purchase New Harmony property and pay off the community's debts. His sons, Robert Dale and William, gave up their shares of the New Lanark mills in exchange for shares in New Harmony. Later, Owen "conveyed the entire New Harmony property to his sons in return for an annuity of $1,500 for the remainder of his life." Owen left New Harmony in June 1827 and focused his interests in the United Kingdom. He died in 1858.

Around 1850 when Fourierism became popular, utopian aspirations resumed in the area, only to die themselves in a short time.

New Harmony survived as a community and emerged as a scientific center under Robert Owen's son, geologist David Dale Owen.

=== Later history and accomplishments ===
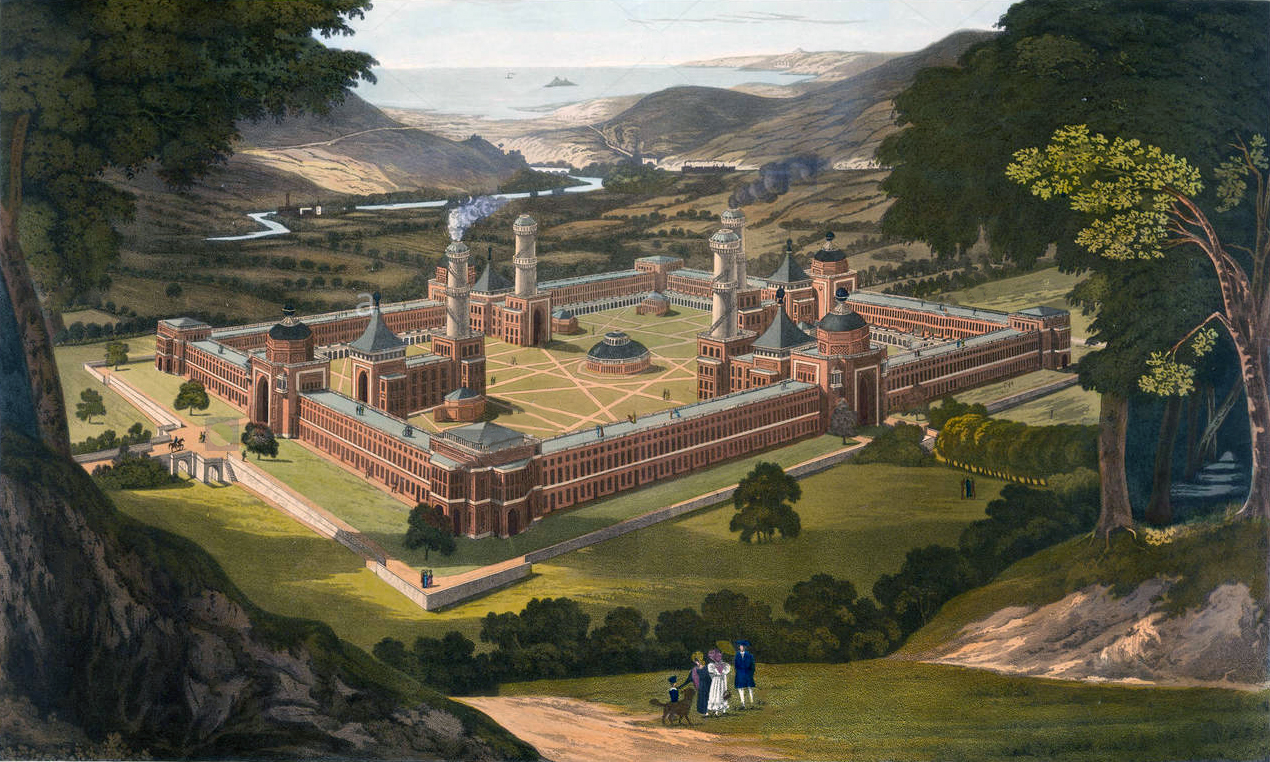
New Harmony, a utopian attempt; depicted as proposed by Robert Owen

==== Science ====
Although Robert Owen's vision of New Harmony as an advance in social reform was not realized, the town became a scientific center of national significance, especially in the natural sciences, most notably geology.

William Maclure (1763–1840), president of the Academy of Natural Sciences of Philadelphia from 1817 to 1840, came to New Harmony during the winter of 1825–1826. Maclure brought a group of noted artists, educators, and fellow scientists, including naturalists Thomas Say and Charles-Alexandre Lesueur, to New Harmony from Philadelphia aboard the keelboat Philanthropist (also known as the "Boatload of Knowledge").

Thomas Say (1787–1834), a friend of Maclure, was an entomologist and conchologist. His definitive studies of shells and insects, numerous contributions to scientific journals, and scientific expeditions to Florida, Georgia, the Rocky Mountains, Mexico, and elsewhere made him an internationally known naturalist. Say has been called the father of American descriptive entomology and American conchology. Prior to his arrival at New Harmony, he served as librarian for the Academy of Natural Sciences in Philadelphia, curator at the American Philosophical Society, and professor of natural history at the University of Pennsylvania. Say died in New Harmony in 1834.

Charles-Alexandre Lesueur (1778–1846), a naturalist and artist, came to New Harmony aboard the Philanthropist. His sketches of New Harmony provide a visual record of the town during the Owenite period. As a naturalist, Lesueur is known for his classification of Great Lakes fishes. He returned to his native France in 1837. Many species were first described by both Say and Lesueur, and many have been named in their honor.

The Church of the Harmonists sketch by Charles Alexandre Lesueur, from the collection of the Academy of Natural Sciences of Philadelphia, one of many sketches preserved in the Lesueur Collection at the Academy

David Dale Owen (1807–1860), third son of Robert Owen, finished his formal education as a medical doctor in 1837. However, after returning to New Harmony, David Dale Owen was influenced by the work of Maclure and Gerard Troost, a Dutch geologist, mineralogist, zoologist, and chemist who arrived in New Harmony in 1825 and later became the state geologist of Tennessee from 1831 to 1850. Owen went on to become a noted geologist. Headquartered at New Harmony, Owen conducted the first official geological survey of Indiana (1837–39). After his appointment as U.S. Geologist in 1839, Owen led federal surveys from 1839 to 1840 and from 1847 to 1851 of the Midwestern United States, which included Iowa, Missouri, Wisconsin, Minnesota, and part of northern Illinois. In 1846 Owen sampled a number of possible building stones for the Smithsonian Institution Building (the Smithsonian "Castle") and recommended the distinctive Seneca Creek sandstone of which that building is constructed. The following year, Owen identified a quarry at Bull Run, twenty-three miles from nation's capital, that provided the stone for the massive building. Owen became the first state geologist of three states: Kentucky (1854–1857), Arkansas (1857–1859), and Indiana (1837–1839 and 1859–1860). Owen's museum and laboratory in New Harmony was known as the largest west of the Allegheny Mountains. At the time of Owen's death in 1860, his museum included some 85,000 items. Among Owen's most significant publications is his Report of a Geological Survey of Wisconsin, Iowa, and Minnesota and Incidentally of a Portion of Nebraska Territory (Philadelphia, 1852).

Several men trained Owen's leadership and influence: Benjamin Franklin Shumard, for whom the Shumard oak is named, was appointed state geologist of Texas by Governor Hardin R. Runnels; Amos Henry Worthen was the second state geologist of Illinois and the first curator of the Illinois State Museum; and Fielding Bradford Meek became the first full-time paleontologist in lieu of salary at the Smithsonian Institution. Joseph Granville Norwood, one of David Dale Owen's colleagues and coauthors, also a medical doctor, became the first state geologist of Illinois (1851–1858). From 1851 to 1854, the Illinois State Geological Survey was headquartered in New Harmony.

Richard Owen (1810–1890), Robert Owen's youngest son, came to New Harmony in 1828 and initially taught school there. He assisted his brother, David Dale Owen, with geological survey and became Indiana's second state geologist. During the American Civil War, Colonel Richard Owen was commandant in charge of Confederate prisoners at Camp Morton in Indianapolis. Following his retirement from the U.S. Army in 1864, Owen became a professor of natural sciences at Indiana University in Bloomington, where an academic building is named in his honor. In 1872 Owen became the first president of Purdue University, but resigned from this position in 1874. He continued teaching at IU until his retirement in 1879.

==== Public service and social reform ====
Robert Dale Owen, eldest son of Robert Owen, was a social reformer and intellectual of national importance. At New Harmony, he taught school and co-edited and published the New Harmony Gazette with Frances Wright. Owen later moved to New York. In 1830 he published "Moral Philosophy," the first treatise in the United States to support birth control, and returned to New Harmony in 1834. From 1836 to 1838, and in 1851, Owen served in the Indiana legislature and was also a delegate to the state's constitutional convention of 1850. Owen was an advocate for women's rights, free public education, and opposed slavery. As a member of the U. S. House of Representatives from 1843 to 1847, Owen introduced a bill in 1846 that established the Smithsonian Institution. He also served as chairman of the Smithsonian Building Committee. He arranged for his brother, David Dale Owen, to sample a large number of possible building stones for the Smithsonian Castle. From 1852 to 1858 Owen held the diplomatic position of charge d'affairs (1853–1858) in Naples, where he began studying spiritualism. Owen's book, Footfalls on the Boundary of Another World (1860), aroused something of a literary sensation. Among his critics in the Boston Investigator and at home in the New Harmony Advertiser were John and Margaret Chappellsmith, he formerly an artist for David Dale Owen's geological publications, and she a former Owenite lecturer. Robert Dales Owen died at Lake George, New York, in 1877.

Frances Wright (1795–1852) came to New Harmony in 1824, where she co-edited and wrote for the New Harmony Gazette with Robert Dale Owen. In 1825 she established an experimental settlement at Nashoba, Tennessee, that allowed African American slaves to work to gain their freedom, but the community failed. A liberal leader in the "free-thought movement," Wright opposed slavery, advocated woman's suffrage, birth control, and free public education. Wright and Robert Dale Owen moved their newspaper to New York City in 1829 and published it as the Free Enquirer. Wright married William Philquepal d'Arusmont, a Pestalozzian educator she met at New Harmony. The couple also lived in Paris, France, and in Cincinnati, Ohio, where they divorced in 1850. Wright died in Cincinnati in 1852.

==== Education ====
The history of education at New Harmony involves several teachers who were already well-established in their fields before they moved to New Harmony, largely through the efforts of William Maclure. These Pestalozzian educators included Marie Duclos Fretageot and Joseph Neef. By the time Maclure arrived in New Harmony he had already established the first Pestalozzian school in America. Fretageot and Neef had been Pestalozzian educators and school administrators at Maclure's schools in Pennsylvania.

Under Maclure's direction and using his philosophy of education, New Harmony schools became the first public schools in the United States open to boys and girls. Maclure also established at New Harmony one of the country's first industrial or trade schools. He also had his extensive library and geological collection shipped to New Harmony from Philadelphia. In 1838 Maclure established the Working Men's Institute, a society for "mutual instruction". It includes the oldest continuously operating library in Indiana, as well as a small museum. The vault in the library contains many historic manuscripts, letters, and documents pertaining to the history of New Harmony. Under the terms of his will, Maclure also offered $500 to any club or society of laborers in the United States who established a reading and lecture room with a library of at least 100 books. About 160 libraries in Indiana and Illinois took advantage of his bequest.

Marie Duclos Fretageot managed Pestalozzian schools that Maclure organized in France and Philadelphia before coming to New Harmony aboard the Philanthropist. In New Harmony she was responsible for the infant's school (for children under age five), supervised several young women she had brought with her from Philadelphia, ran a store, and was Maclure's administrator during his residence in Mexico. Fretageot remained in New Harmony until 1831, returned to France, and later joined Maclure in Mexico, where she died in 1833. Correspondence of Maclure and Fretageot from 1820 to 1833 was extensive and is documented in Partnership for Posterity.

Joseph Neef ( 1770–1854) published in 1808 the first work on educational method to be written in English in the United States, Sketch of A Plan and Method of Education. Maclure brought Neef, a Pestalozzian educator from Switzerland, to Philadelphia, and placed him in charge of his school for boys. It was the first school in the United States to be based on Pestalozzian methods. In 1826 Neef, his wife, and children came to New Harmony to run the schools under Maclure's direction. Neef, following Maclure's curriculum, became superintendent of the schools in New Harmony, where as many as 200 students, ranging in age from five to twelve, were enrolled.

Jane Dale Owen Fauntleroy (1806–1861), daughter of Robert Owen, arrived in New Harmony in 1833. She married civil engineer Robert Henry Fauntleroy in 1835. He became a business partner of David Dale and Robert Dale Owen. Jane Owen Fauntleroy established a seminary for young women in her family's New Harmony home, where her brother, David Dale Owen, taught science.

Students in New Harmony now attend North Posey High School after New Harmony High School closed in 2012.

==== Publishing ====
Cornelius Tiebout (c. 1773–1832) was an artist, printer, and engraver of considerable fame when he joined the New Harmony community in September 1826. Tiebout taught printing and published a bimonthly newspaper, Disseminator of Useful Knowledge, and books using the town's printing press. He died in New Harmony in 1832.

Publications from New Harmony's press include William Maclure's Essay on the Formation of Rocks, or an Inquiry into the Probably Origin of their Present Form (1832); and Maclure's Structure and Observations on the Geology of the West India Islands; from Barbadoes to Santa Cruz, Inclusive (1832); Thomas Say's Description of New Species of North American Insects; Observations on Some of the Species Already Described; Descriptions of Some New Terrestrial and Fluviatile Shells of North America; and several of the early volumes of Say's American Conchology, or Descriptions of the Shells of North America. (The seventh volume of American Conchology was published in Philadelphia.)

Lucy Sistare Say was an apprentice at Fretageot's Pestalozzian school and a former student of Lesueur in Philadelphia before coming to New Harmony aboard the Philanthropist to teach needlework and drawing. En route to Indiana, Sistare met Thomas Say and the two were married on January 4, 1827, prior to their arrival at New Harmony. An accomplished artist, Say illustrated and hand-colored 66 of the 68 illustrations in American Conchology, her husband's multi-volume work on mollusks. Following Thomas Say's death in 1834, she moved to New York, trained to become an engraver, and worked to complete and publish the final volume of American Conchology. Lucy Say remained interested in the natural sciences after returning to the East. In 1841 she became the first female member of the Academy of Natural Sciences of Philadelphia.

German-American folk artist Jacob Maentel (c. 1763–1863) lived in New Harmony from 1836 until his death. During this time he prolifically painted portraiture in the fraktur style and portrayed the dress and décor of local Owenites. Examples of his work are displayed in the Smithsonian American Art Museum, the American Folk Art Museum, and the Abby Aldrich Rockefeller Museum.

Publications on the history of New Harmony include the work of the New Harmony historian and resident, Josephine Mirabella Elliott.

==== Theater ====
William Owen (1802–1842), Robert Owen's second oldest son, was involved in New Harmony's business and community affairs. He was among the leaders who founded New Harmony's Thespian Society and acted in some of the group's performances. Owen also helped establish the Posey County Agricultural Society and, in 1834, became director of the State Bank of Indiana, Evansville Branch. He died in New Harmony in 1842.

=== Historic structures ===
More than 30 structures from the Harmonist and Owenite utopian communities remain as part of the New Harmony Historic District, which is a National Historic Landmark. In addition, architect Richard Meier designed New Harmony's Atheneum, which serves as the Visitors Center for Historic New Harmony, and depicts the history of the community. Also listed on the National Register of Historic Places are the George Bentel House, Ludwig Epple House, Harmony Way Bridge, Mattias Scholle House, and Amon Clarence Thomas House.

== Geography ==
The Wabash River forms the western boundary of New Harmony. It is the westernmost settlement in Indiana.

According to the 2010 census, New Harmony has a total area of 0.65 square miles (1.68 km^{2}), of which 0.64 square miles (1.66 km^{2}) (or 98.46%) is land and 0.01 square miles (0.03 km^{2}) (or 1.54%) is water.

=== Paul Tillich Park ===
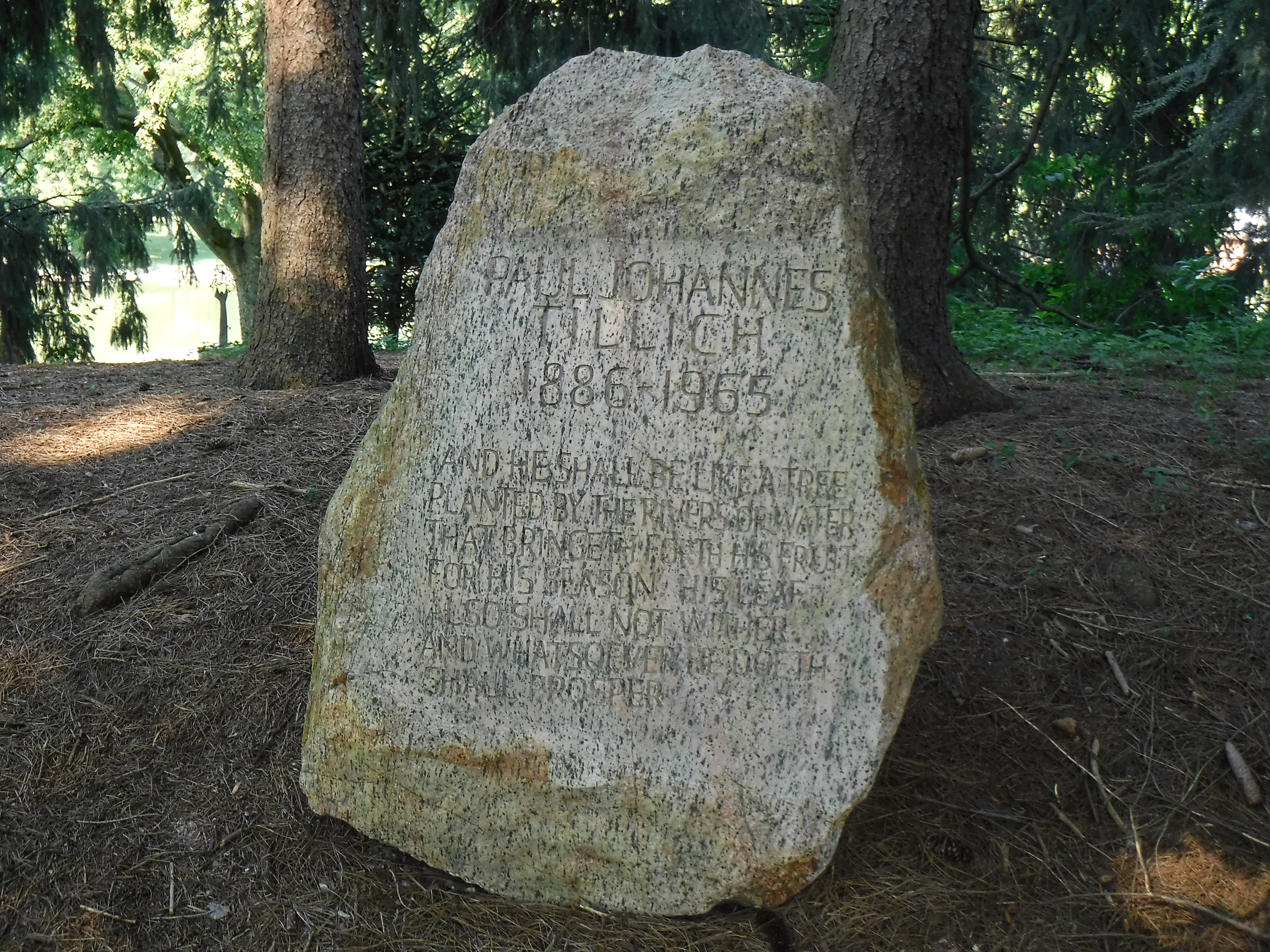
Paul Tillich's gravestone in the Paul Tillich Park

Paul Tillich Park commemorates the renowned twentieth century theologian, Paul Johannes Tillich. The park was dedicated by Tillich on June 2, 1963, and his ashes were interred there in 1965.

Located just across North Main Street from the Roofless Church, the park consists of a stand of evergreens on elevated ground surrounding a walkway. Along the walkway there are several large stones on which are inscribed quotations from Tillich's writings. James Rosati's sculpture of Tillich's head rises at the north end of the walkway, backed by a clearing and a large pond.

=== Climate ===
The climate in this area is characterized by hot, humid summers and generally mild to cool winters. According to the Köppen Climate Classification system, New Harmony has a humid subtropical climate, abbreviated "Cfa" on climate maps. On April 2, 2024, an EF-2 Tornado with peak winds of 115 mph touched down outside of town, in nearby Harmonie State Park.

== Demographics ==
Historical population
Census	Pop.	Note	%±
1850	700		—
1860	825		17.9%
1870	836		1.3%
1880	1,095		31.0%
1890	1,197		9.3%
1900	1,341		12.0%
1910	1,229		−8.4%
1920	1,126		−8.4%
1930	1,022		−9.2%
1940	1,390		36.0%
1950	1,360		−2.2%
1960	1,121		−17.6%
1970	971		−13.4%
1980	945		−2.7%
1990	846		−10.5%
2000	916		8.3%
2010	789		−13.9%
2020	690		−12.5%
U.S. Decennial Census

=== 2010 census ===
As of the census of 2010, there were 789 people, 370 households, and 194 families residing in the town. The population density was 1,232.8 inhabitants per square mile (476.0/km^{2}). There were 464 dwelling units at an average density of 725.0 per square mile (279.9/km^{2}). The racial makeup of the town was 99.0% White, 0.3% Native American, 0.1% Asian, and 0.6% from two or more races.

There were 370 households, of which 17.3% had children under the age of 18 living with them, 42.7% were married couples living together, 7.3% had a female householder with no husband present, 2.4% had a male householder with no wife present, and 47.6% were non-families. 43.5% of all households were made up of individuals, and 23.5% had someone living alone who was 65 years of age or older. The average household size was 1.93 and the average family size was 2.62.

The median age in the town was 55.1 years. 13.1% of residents were under the age of 18; 5.7% were between the ages of 18 and 24; 17.3% were from 25 to 44; 30.4% were from 45 to 64; and 33.5% were 65 years of age or older. The gender makeup of the town was 43.2% male and 56.8% female.

=== 2000 census ===
As of the 2000 census, there were 916 people, 382 households, and 228 families residing in the town. The population density was 1,441.5 inhabitants per square mile (556.6/km^{2}). There were 432 dwelling units at an average density of 679.8 per square mile (262.5/km^{2}). The racial makeup of the town was 98.91% White, 0.55% Native American, 0.22% Asian, and 0.33% from two or more races. Hispanic or Latino of any race were 0.44% of the population.

There were 382 households, out of which 27.0% had children under the age of 18 living with them, 46.9% were married couples living together, 9.9% had a female householder with no husband present, and 40.1% were non-families. 38.0% of all households were made up of individuals, and 21.2% had someone living alone who was 65 years of age or older. The average household size was 2.12 and the average family size was 2.80.

In the town, the population was spread out, with 20.3% under the age of 18, 4.5% from 18 to 24, 21.2% from 25 to 44, 24.7% from 45 to 64, and 29.4% who were 65 years of age or older. The median age was 47 years. For every 100 females, there were 82.5 males. For every 100 females age 18 and over, there were 71.4 males.

The median income for a household in the town was $28,182, and the median income for a family was $40,865. Males had a median income of $39,250 versus $21,607 for females. The per capita income for the town was $17,349. About 12.2% of families and 12.4% of the population were below the poverty line, including 14.8% of those under age 18 and 17.1% of those age 65 or over.

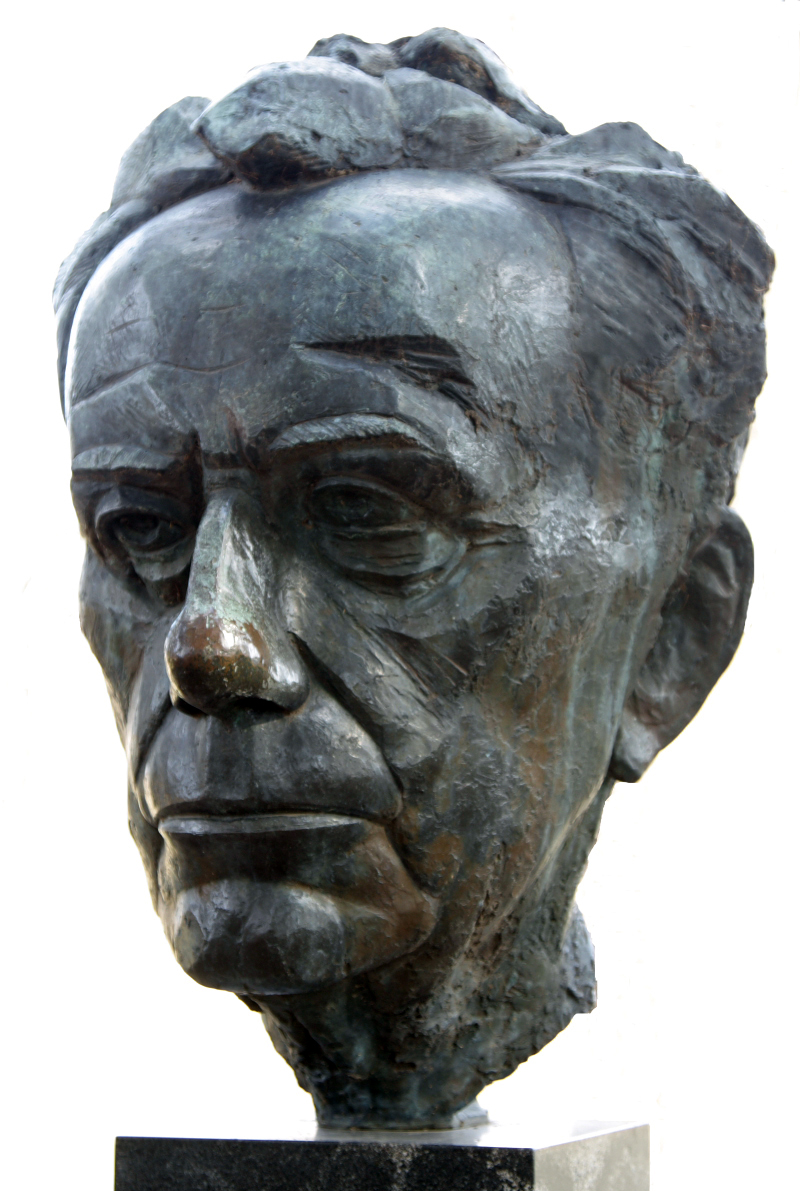
Bust of Paul Johannes Tillich by James Rosati in New Harmony

== Education ==
New Harmony is located in the Metropolitan School District of North Posey County.

It was previously in the New Harmony Town and Township Consolidated Schools. For over 200 years, New Harmony was served by New Harmony School, a K–12 school. In 2012, due to low enrollment and funding cuts, the school consolidated with the MSD of North Posey County.

The North Posey district operates four schools, with three relevant to New Harmony:

- North Posey High School (9–12)
- North Posey Junior High School (7–8)
- North Elementary School (K–6) is the zoned school for areas in parts of the district west of Hidbrader Road, an area which would include the Town of New Harmony.

== Transportation ==
- Indiana State Road 66, ends at New Harmony Toll Bridge.
- Indiana State Road 68, ends just north of New Harmony
- Indiana State Road 69, used to end at New Harmony, now goes around town and ends at nearby Griffin.

== Notable people ==
- Thomas Say (1787–1834), entomologist, conchologist and herpetologist, died in New Harmony

== See also ==
- Grand Rapids Dam
- Grand Rapids Hotel
- List of public art in New Harmony, Indiana
- Old Economy Village
