= Joseph Neef =

American educational reformer and pedagogue (1770–1854)

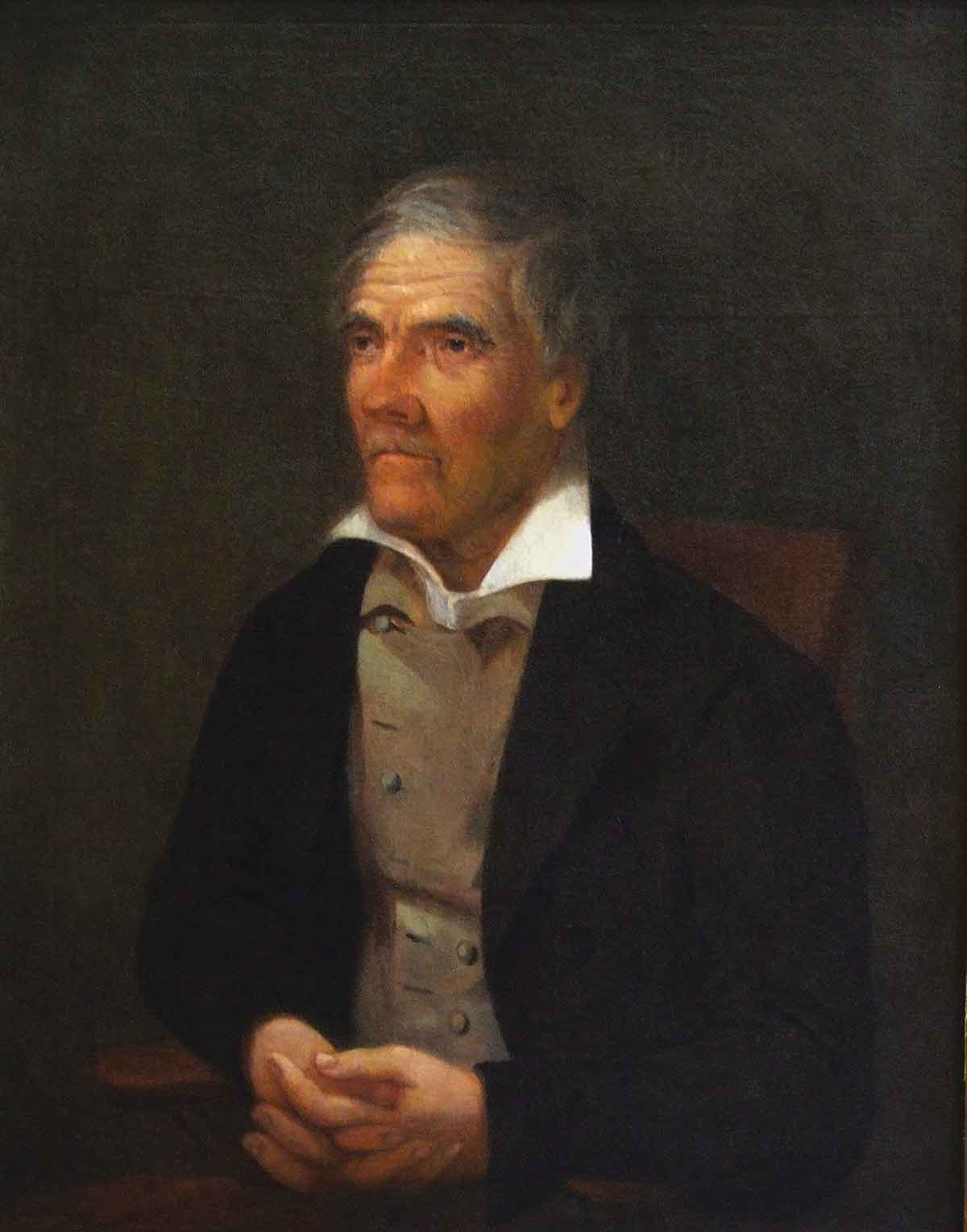
Painting by David Dale Owen

Francis Joseph Nicholas Neef also Franz Joseph Nikolaus Näef known mainly as Joseph Neef (6 December 1770 – 8 April 1854) was an educational reformer and pedagogue, who founded the first Pestalozzian school in the United States and published the first book in English, Sketch of a Plan and Method of Education (1808), on the teaching method there. He began schools in Philadelphia, Delaware (1813), Kentucky (until 1826) and then at New Harmony, Indiana, along with Robert Owen.

== Life ==
Neef was born in 1770 in Alsace, and grew up speaking both French and German. Intending at first to enter the priesthood, he also learned Latin, Greek, and Italian, but was inspired by the French Revolution to join the French army in 1791. In the five years of war service he gave up supernatural beliefs. During the Battle of Arcola he received a wound between his right eye and nose which left him blind for a while. A musket ball was lodged close to his optic chiasm. The ball was removed only after his death. While recovering from the wounds in Soultz, he regained his sight and he began to read the works of Swiss educationist Johann Heinrich Pestalozzi. Pestalozzi's ideals of achieving equality and liberty through educational reform appealed to Neef, who was inspired to become a teacher.

In 1800, Pestalozzi opened a school in Burgdorf, Switzerland, which broke with European and American traditions of rote learning and recitation, focusing instead on allowing children to pursue their curiosity. His method called for the creation of a nurturing environment, in which children were able to learn and develop at their own pace, led by the teacher. Neef visited the school, and was hired as a language teacher. After three years of training, he was sent to Paris to open a school there. In 1803, he married Luise Buss from Tübingen who was the sister of Johannes Buss, the geometry teacher in Burgdorf. Pestalozzi was requested to send a teacher to St. Petersburg by the Tsar and Neef was offered the position but refused. Neef however took a position that was offered in Paris in 1803. In 1805, geologist and philanthropist William Maclure visited the school in Paris, and offered to pay the salary of a teacher who could open a Pestalozzian school in the United States. Neef accepted, spending two years learning English before opening his school outside Philadelphia. The school, five miles out of the city, emphasised time spent outside and exercise. In the same year, he published Sketch of a Plan and Method of Education...Suitable for the Offspring of a Free People, and for All Rational Beings (1808). The book explained the Pestalozzian method, which was grounded in observation and discussion.

In 1812, Neef was elected to the Academy of Natural Sciences. In 1813, the school was moved to Delaware, and the following year to Kentucky. In 1823, Neef travelled on the "Boatload of Knowledge" to Robert Owen's settlement at New Harmony, Indiana. In 1826, Owen invited Neef to New Harmony to run the school there, which he accepted. After the failure of the New Harmony experiment, Neef established a school in Cincinnati, returning to New Harmony in 1834.

From around 1830, Luise and Neef lived with their daughter Wilhelmina. Their only son Victor died in 1837. Another daughter Zulima died in 1842. Luise died in 1845. Neef then moved to live with his daughter Carolina who was married to David Dale Owen and died in 1854. Owen painted the only known portrait of Neef.
