= List of public art in New Harmony, Indiana =

This is a list of public art in New Harmony, Indiana.

This list applies only to works of public art accessible in an outdoor public space. For example, this does not include artwork visible inside a museum.

Most of the works mentioned are sculptures. When this is not the case (i.e. sound installation, for example) it is stated next to the title.

== New Harmony ==
Title	Artist	Year	Location/GPS Coordinates	Material	Dimensions	Owner	Image
Angel of the Annunciation	Stephen De Staebler	1999	Roofless Church				
Arch	Bruno La Verdiere	1971	Roofless Church	Stoneware			
Fountain of Commitment	Don Gummer	2003	Church Park	Bronze & Glass			
Meditation	Jacques Lipchitz	1960	Red Geranium Inn	Bronze	Approx. 30 x 18 x 18 in.	Red Geranium Enterprises	
Pietà	Stephen De Staebler		Roofless Church	Bronze			
Polish Memorial	Eva Sygulska	1968	Roofless Church	Bronze & Granite			
Shalev	Tobi Kahnz			Bronze & Granite			
St. Francis & the Angel of the 6th Seal	David Kocka		New Harmony Inn				
St. Francis and the Birds	Frederick Franck			Cor-Ten Steel & Paint			
The Descent of the Holy Spirit	Jacques Lipchitz		Roofless Church	Bronze			
Virgin	Jacques Lipchitz	1960	Roofless Church	Bronze	Approx. H. 90 x 44 x 36 in	Restricted name	
Wayside Shrine			Roofless Church	Bronze			
