= Margaret Chappellsmith =

English-born socialist and women's rights activist

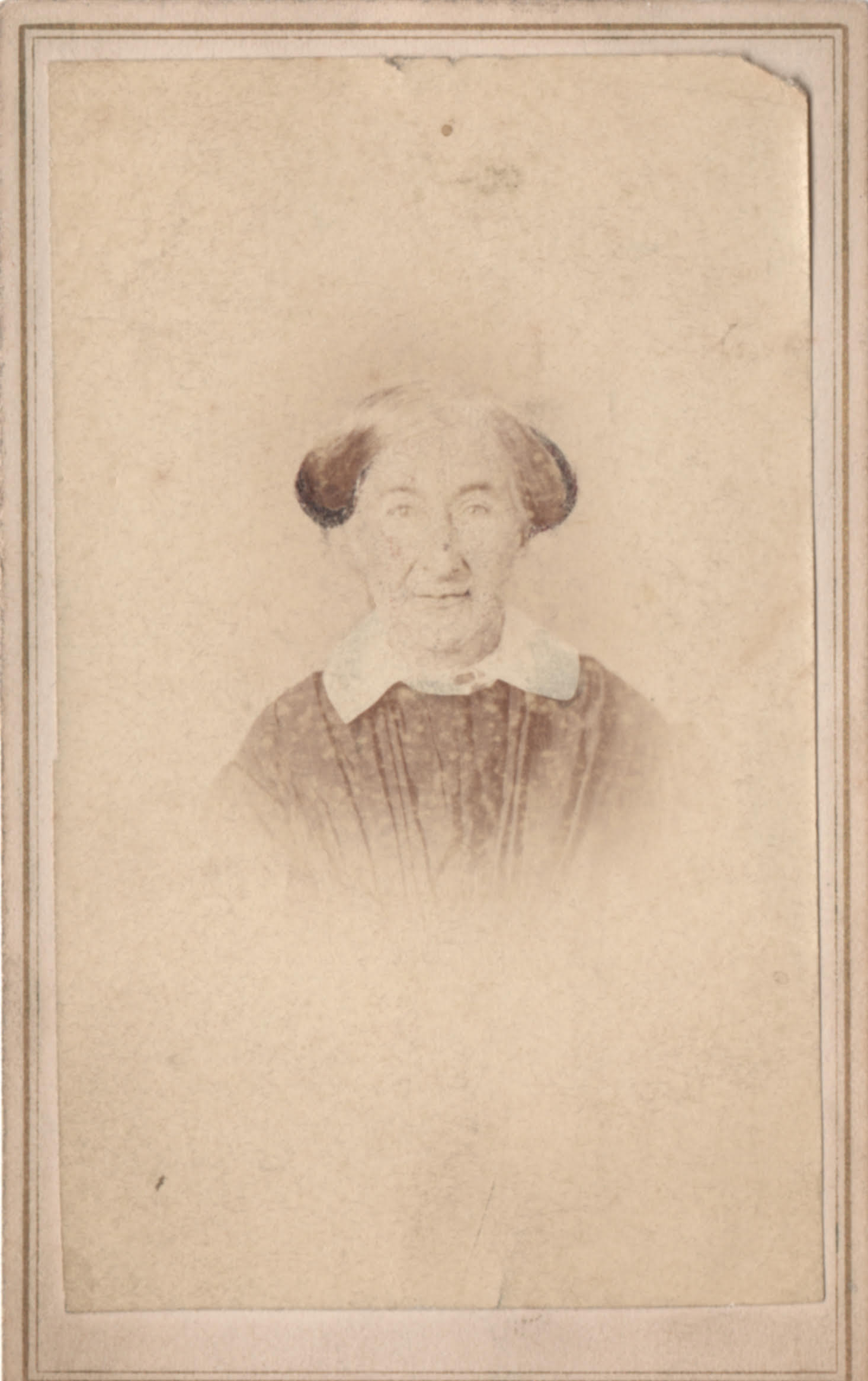
- Born: Margaret Reynolds; February 27, 1806; Aldgate, London, England
- Died: 1883; New Harmony, Indiana, USA
- Occupations: Writer, lecturer, women's rights activist
- Movement: Owenism
- Spouse: John Chappellsmith

Margaret Chappellsmith (1806–1883) was a socialist lecturer, active in London, England and the United States in the 19th century. She campaigned on communitarianism, currency reform and the women's position.

== Early life ==
Chappellsmith [née Reynolds], was born in February 1806 in Aldgate, London. Her family was probably upper working class and she had at least three sisters and two brothers. She was a staunch Baptist until her early adulthood, when a friend of her sister's introduced her to the ideas of Robert Owen. Owen's ideas exerted an immediate influence upon her and by 1836 she had begun to write political articles for The Dispatch. These articles reflected her interest in communitarianism, women's position, and also in currency reform — a topic to which she had been led by her reading of William Cobbett. She continued to strengthen her ties with the Owenites and by 1839 she was working as a salaried lecturer for the movement. In this capacity she enjoyed huge success. Numerous reports to the Owenite press testified that she was one of the most popular speakers on the socialist circuit, frequently drawing huge crowds to her lectures. She was evidently a speaker of exceptional charisma: The Charter newspaper, for example, spoke of her 'livid and impressive manner'.

== Her lectures ==
Chappellsmith's lectures during the peak years of the Owenite social reform movement can be classified chronologically as follows:

1. five lectures at the Lambeth Social Institution
2. lectures in cities other than London
3. lectures in or near London.

She spoke on marriage, the effects of the industrial revolution, the formation and reformation of character, the Protestant Reformation, monetary issues, and women's rights and duties.

== Writings in New Moral World ==
The most detailed accounts of her many Owenite lectures are found in New Moral World, a journal founded by Robert Owen in 1834. In a letter dated September 23, 1838, Miss Reynolds represented Mr. Owen on the subject of marriage; after the letter was rejected by the London Weekly Dispatch, the editor of New Moral World took "much pleasure in giving it insertion," with a hope of "being favoured with any future communications of the authoress." This letter appears to be the earliest of Miss Reynold's many writings in New Moral World. On August 27, 1839, she married John Chappellsmith (a portrait artist who exhibited at the Royal Academy of Arts between 1838 and 1842; born John Chappell Smith in 1805), and her letters, and reports about her lectures, continued to appear in New Moral World, under her married name, until July 1, 1843.

== Currency reform ==
Chappellsmith was a fierce defender of Owen's principles and particularly championed the possibilities which his system might herald for the emancipation of women. The ideas of William Cobbett, and in particular his criticism of the government's handling of currency reform, also continued to inform her ideas. In her highly popular lectures on currency reform she argued, with the assistance of an array of graphs and illustrations, that Cobbett's prophecies concerning the disastrous effect of state fiscal policies upon living standards had been fully vindicated. Her passion for this cause was further illustrated when, in 1841, she condensed and edited Cobbett's work Paper Against Gold. Chappellsmith followed the practice of other Owenite lecturers, such as Frances Morrison, in performing secular 'baptisms' or naming ceremonies for babies at the end of her lectures.

== Public condemnation ==
As a woman lecturing for the Owenite movement, and on such controversial topics as divorce, Chappellsmith often faced bitter public condemnation. On one occasion, in the town of Paisley, Scotland for example, she was met by a mob of women who stoned and abused her. Similarly, in South Shields she was followed by a violent crowd who shouted, 'Are you her with the seven husbands?' Such accusations were no doubt fuelled by an article in The Antidote, or, The Anti-Socialist Gazette (1841) which alleged that Chappellsmith had left her husband and embarked upon a series of affairs with socialist men. However, her detractors, in particular the editor, John Brindley, were rather disappointed to discover (after fully investigating Chappellsmith's private life) that she had but one man in her life, John Chappellsmith, to whom she had been happily married since 1839. John Chappellsmith fully supported his wife's activities and politics and assisted at her lectures. In 1842 Margaret Chappellsmith, who was also an active member of the Anti-Persecution Union, opened a bookshop in London and appears to have given up lecturing shortly afterwards.

== Emigration to the USA ==
In 1850 the Chappellsmiths, who apparently had no children, emigrated from Liverpool to Indiana, USA on The Maine, taking only 43 days to travel to "the bank of the Mississippi". They were accompanied by other members of their family, perhaps to join one of Margaret's sisters who had earlier emigrated there. In America, Chappellsmith returned to journalism, contributing articles on a wide variety of subjects to the Boston Investigator. The move to the United States did not prove to be a great success. The Chappellsmiths were attracted to Indiana by the settlement at New Harmony; the Owenite community there had disbanded in 1827 but its leader, Robert Dale Owen (a son of Robert Owen), among others, continued to be based there.

== Disillusionment with Robert Dale Owen ==
The Chappellsmiths were disillusioned by the political and religious atmosphere they found at New Harmony. In particular, Margaret Chappellsmith was aggrieved by what she considered to be Owen's conversion to religion and his pragmatic stance on abolition of slavery. The bitter articles and lectures she subsequently wrote on R. D. Owen proved influential among the socialist community in Britain, to the consternation of Owen's family.

During Abraham Lincoln's campaign for the 1860 presidential election, the Chappellsmiths, who were outspoken Republicans, exchanged angry letters with Robert Dale Owen and his brother Richard Owen, both influential Democrats, in the New Harmony Advertiser.

== Other writings ==
Margaret Reynolds 25 articles in Henry Hetherington's London Dispatch ran from the first issue (September 17, 1836) to the forty-third (July 9, 1837); all were all signed "A woman," identified in her obituary in the Evansville Daily Journal (March 7, 1883). Among her articles in the New Harmony Advertiser (1858–1860) are "Ancient Roman Civilization" and "The System of Castes in India." Her writings in the Boston Investigator include 10 articles on the religions in India, with comparisons to Christianity (June 6, 1860 to June 25, 1862), five article on "Circumstances and Moral Accountability" (May 26, 1862 to June 25, 1862), eight on comparisons of actions of the governments of England and the United States (January 21, 1863 to September 30, 1863), five opposing Robert Dale Owen's articles on spiritualism (March 2, 1864 to April 6, 1864, and September 21 and 28, 1864), eight "On the Historical Existence of Jesus (September 6 to November 22, 1871), and 60 "On the 'Historical Value' of the Gospels" (February 21, 1872 to November 18, 1874).

== Mid-life and later life ==
Margaret Chappellsmith was evidently an obdurate woman of uncompromising and sometimes surprisingly puritanical principles. She was extremely critical of socialist branches which permitted young men and women to waltz together, for example (although the waltz was earlier regarded by many religious leaders as vulgar and sinful, described as an obscene display "confined to prostitutes and adulteresses" in the Times of London, July 16, 1816). Perhaps more tellingly, she once explained to Robert Owen that she refused to forgive her sister for the way she had behaved towards a potential suitor many years previously until she demonstrated signs of 'self-reproach', hoping that this would induce her to a 'careful examination' of her feelings. Such inflexibility perhaps helps to explain Chappellsmith's difficulty in finding happiness in a foreign culture. Indeed, accounts of Chappellsmith from the latter part of her life suggest a somewhat embittered and eccentric personality. Nevertheless, she remained at New Harmony until her death there in February 1883.

John survived her, and lived until 1895.
