= Lyell Glacier =

Glacier in California, United States

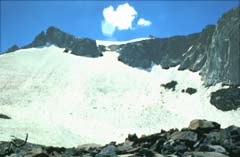
- East lobe of Lyell Glacier

- Location within California Location within the United States
- Type: Mountain glacier
- Location: Yosemite National Park, Tuolumne County, California, United States
- Coordinates: 37°44′35″N 119°16′09″W
- Length: .5 mi (0.80 km) estimated
- Terminus: Talus
- Status: Retreating

Lyell Glacier is in the Sierra Nevada of California. The glacier was discovered by John Muir in 1871, and was the largest glacier in Yosemite National Park. It lies on the northern slopes of Mount Lyell.

The glacier has retreated since the end of the Little Ice Age in the mid-19th century. During the mid-20th Century, the glacier split into two smaller glaciers occupying the high cirques of Mount Lyell. Since 1883, the glacier area has retreated up to 70 percent. Another glacier, the Maclure Glacier on nearby Mount Maclure, has also retreated significantly.

According to a study in 2013, today the Lyell is no longer a glacier, having lost any movement and thus it should be considered an ice field.

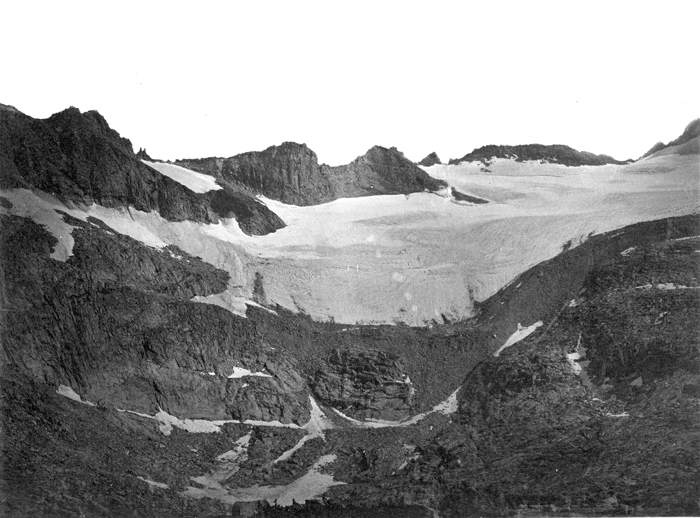
Lyell Glacier in 1883

== See also ==
- List of glaciers in the United States
