= Jacob Maentel =

German-American folk artist

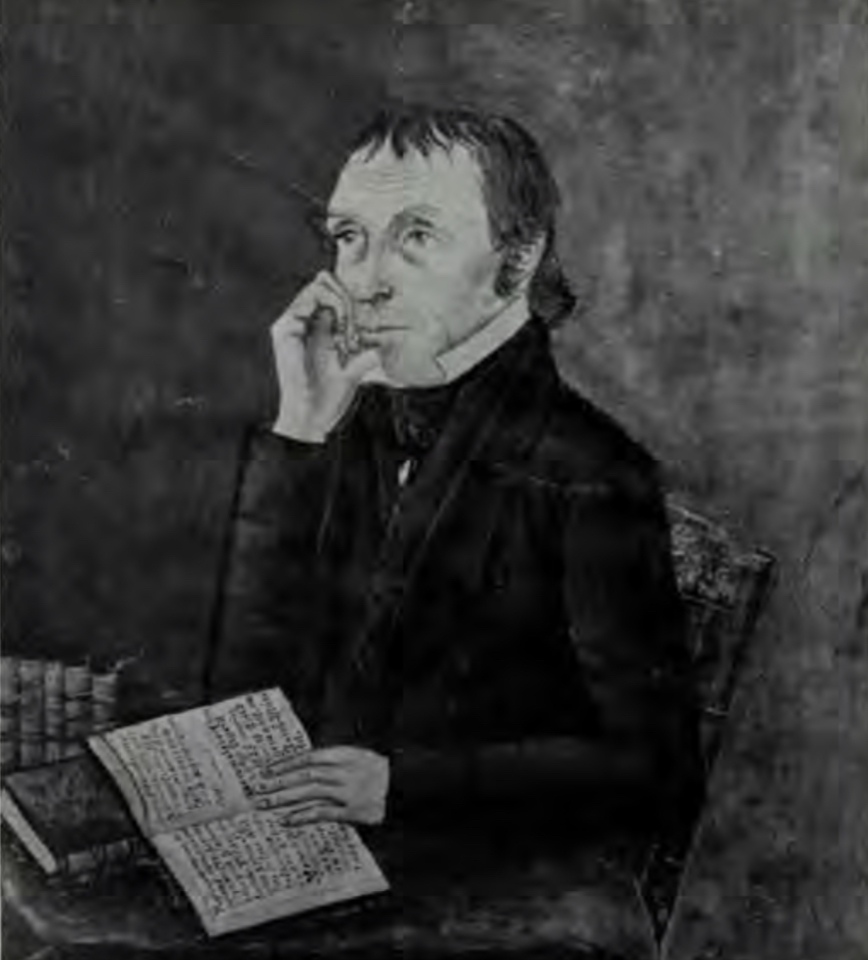
Jacob Maentel. Possible Self-Portrait. 1828.

Jacob Maentel or Mental (1763–1863) was a German-American folk artist known for his portrayal of 19th-Century America. Maentel is most notable for his watercolor portrait art that minutely portrayed the décor and dress of early American immigrant communities.

Little was known of Maentel's life until American art historian Mary Black reconstructed his life through her scholarship beginning in the 1960s.

== Early life ==
Maentel was born Johann Adam Bernhard Jacob Maentel in Kassel, Holy Roman Empire in 1763. After training as a physician, Maentel worked as a mercenary and entered Napoleon Bonaparte's Army during the War of the Third Coalition where, according to tradition, he served as Napoleon's secretary in Westphalia. In 1806 Maentel was discharged from the French Army around the time of his father's death.

=== Eastern United States ===
Maentel immigrated to the United States in 1806 after first living in Baltimore where he advertised portrait commissions. He was traveling to and from Pennsylvania by 1807 where he produced portraits of Dauphin, Lebanon, and York County residents. During the War of 1812, Maentel served in the Second Regiment of the Second Brigade of the Pennsylvania Militia. He was naturalized as a US citizen in 1815 at the culmination of his service. During his time in the militia, Maentel produced portraits of his regiment's officers and their families

Maentel married Catherine Weaver of Baltimore in 1821. They had four children: William, Louisa (later married to Owenite educator-turned-capitalist Thomas Mumford Sr.), Wilhemina, and Frederick. Following his marriage, Maentel lived in Lebanon County, Pennsylvania and produced numerous portraits of local residents, many of them German-Americans over the next 20 years.

=== New Harmony, Indiana ===
In 1836 Maentel and his family began the westward journey to Texas which was a magnet for many Pennsylvania German immigrants. They became ill en route and convalesced in New Harmony, Indiana. New Harmony was the site of a failed German utopianist community and was sold to Maclure- Owenite reformers and intellectuals in 1825. Taken with the community, Maentel and his family settled in the former utopian village. As late as 1850, Maentel continued to work as an itinerant portrait painter in Indiana and Illinois. While in New Harmony, Maentel painted the prominent Cooper, Jacques, and Faul families including triptychs on fireplace hearth screens. Examples of these are preserved in the Jacques Parlor maintained as a museum.

== Later life and death ==
Maentel lived and painted in New Harmony until his death in 1863. Much of his work was lost in an 1858 fire including miniature portraits of his sisters, his Army discharge papers, and other portraiture. Salvaged from the fire was book of "Materia Medica" handwritten to include a recipe for "Mental Salve," still singed and in a family collection. Maentel spent his last years living with his daughter Louisa and the Mumford family. Maentel died in 1863 and is interred in the Mumford plot at Maple Hill Cemetery. A New Harmony Gazette entry notes the following:

"Old man Mantle, one of Bonaparte's old soldiers died today [April 28, 1863] he was near 100 years old, born June 15, 1763."

== Style ==
Maentel's portraiture style was distinctive due to his use of profile. Maentel captured his subject's personalities through realistic, and sometimes unflattering, portrayals. His work relied on diagonal design, detailed facial and body characteristics, and oriental treatment of foliage. Maentel's whimsical and untrained style influenced a school of 19th century portraiture unique to Pennsylvania-Dutch communities.

During his time in the militia, Maentel painted portraits of military officers and members of their families, backdropped by detailed home decorations, and typically showing them posed in the corners of well-furnished parlors. These portraits set in interiors are valued today as documentation of the local ethnic community’s style of domestic furnishing. Maentel also pictured his subjects in landscape settings. Additionally, Maentel produced illustrations for marriage and birth certificates in the tradition of fraktur painting characteristic of the Pennsylvania Dutch community.

== Legacy ==
Maentel's produced portraiture prolifically for over fifty years. While the majority of portraits were painted in Southeastern Pennsylvania (Lancaster, York, Dauphin, Berks and Lebanon counties), It was later that the artist moved westward to Indiana where his work included fireplace screens and wall decorations.

Maentel's works appear in a number of museums including the Abby Aldrich Rockefeller Folk Art Museum, Winterthur, the Smithsonian American Art Museum, and the American Folk Art Museum.

== Selected works ==
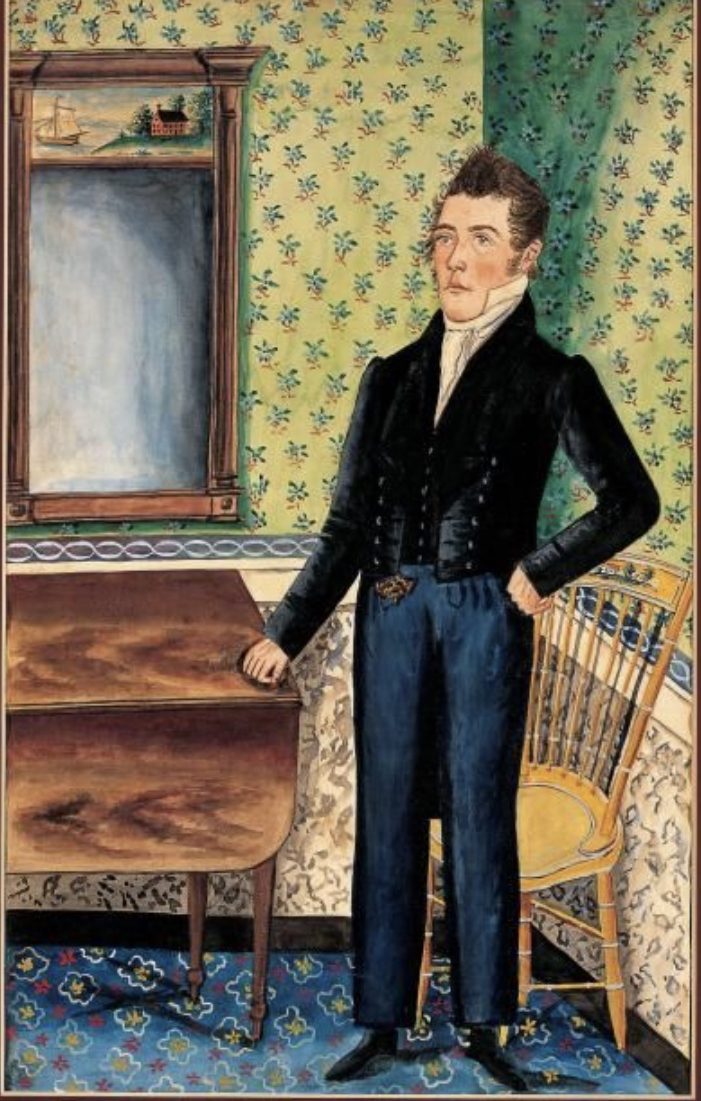
Peter Zimmerman Portrait. American Folk Art Museum.

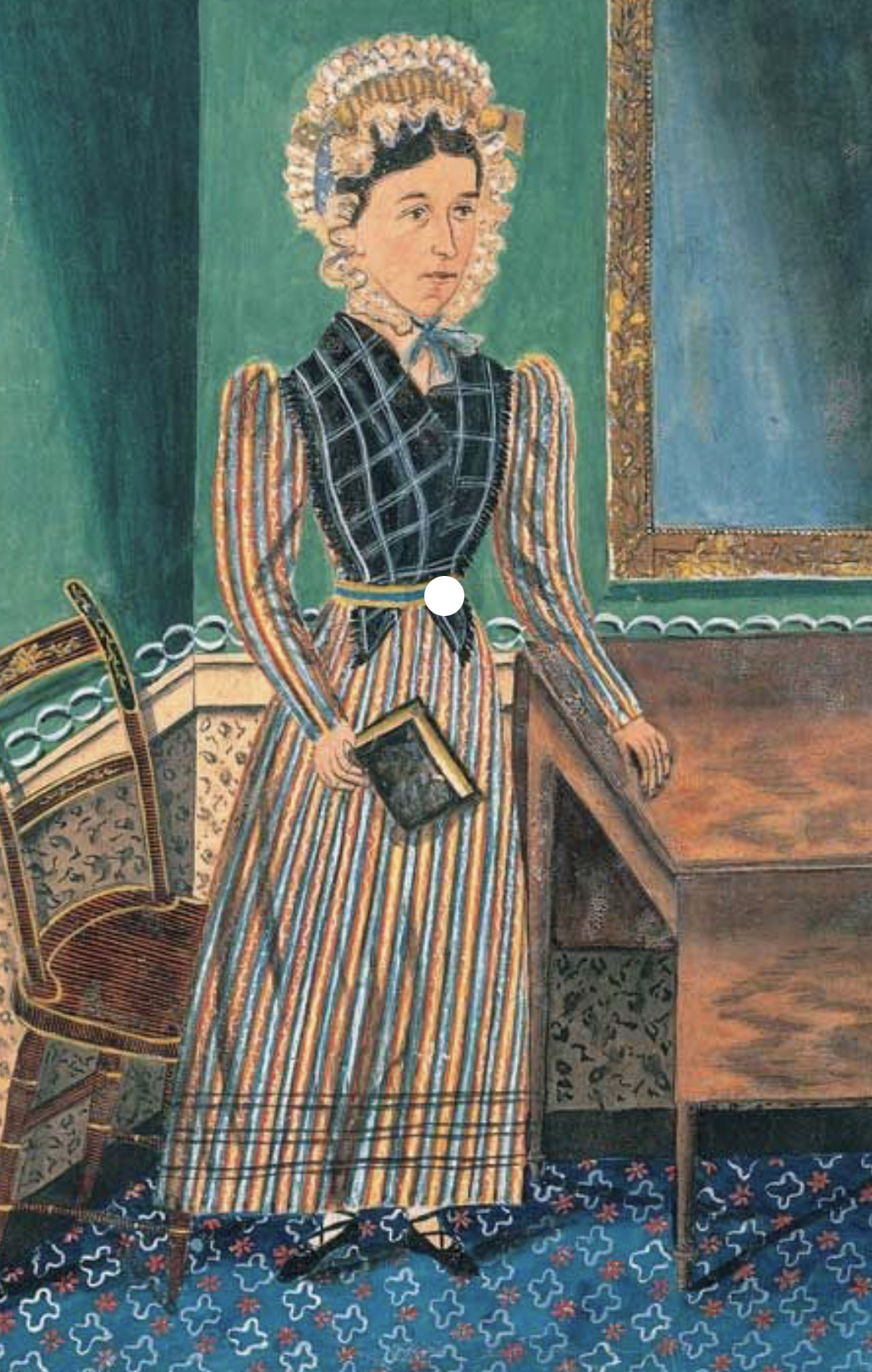
Mary Boucher Portrait. American Folk Art Museum.

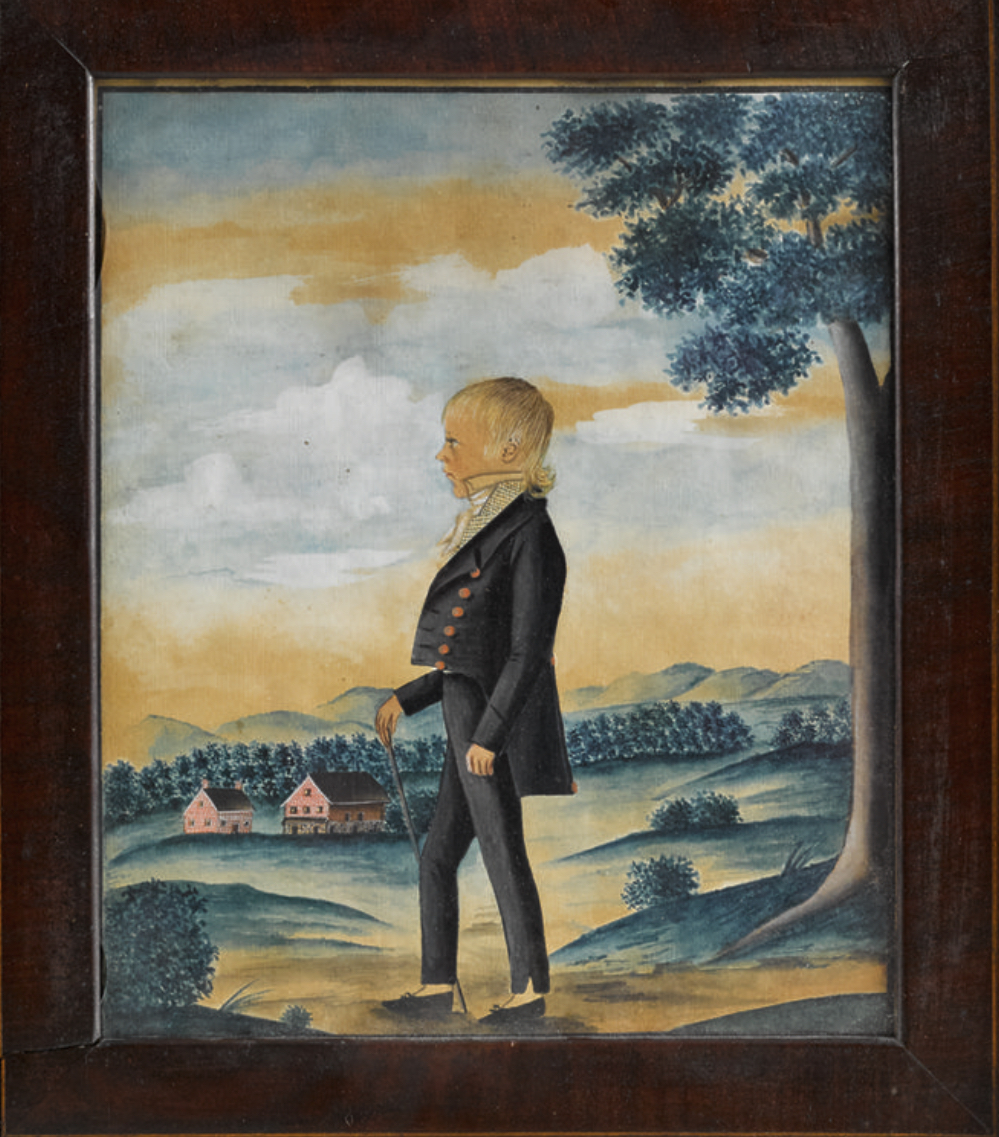
Portrait of a boy. Jacob Maentel.

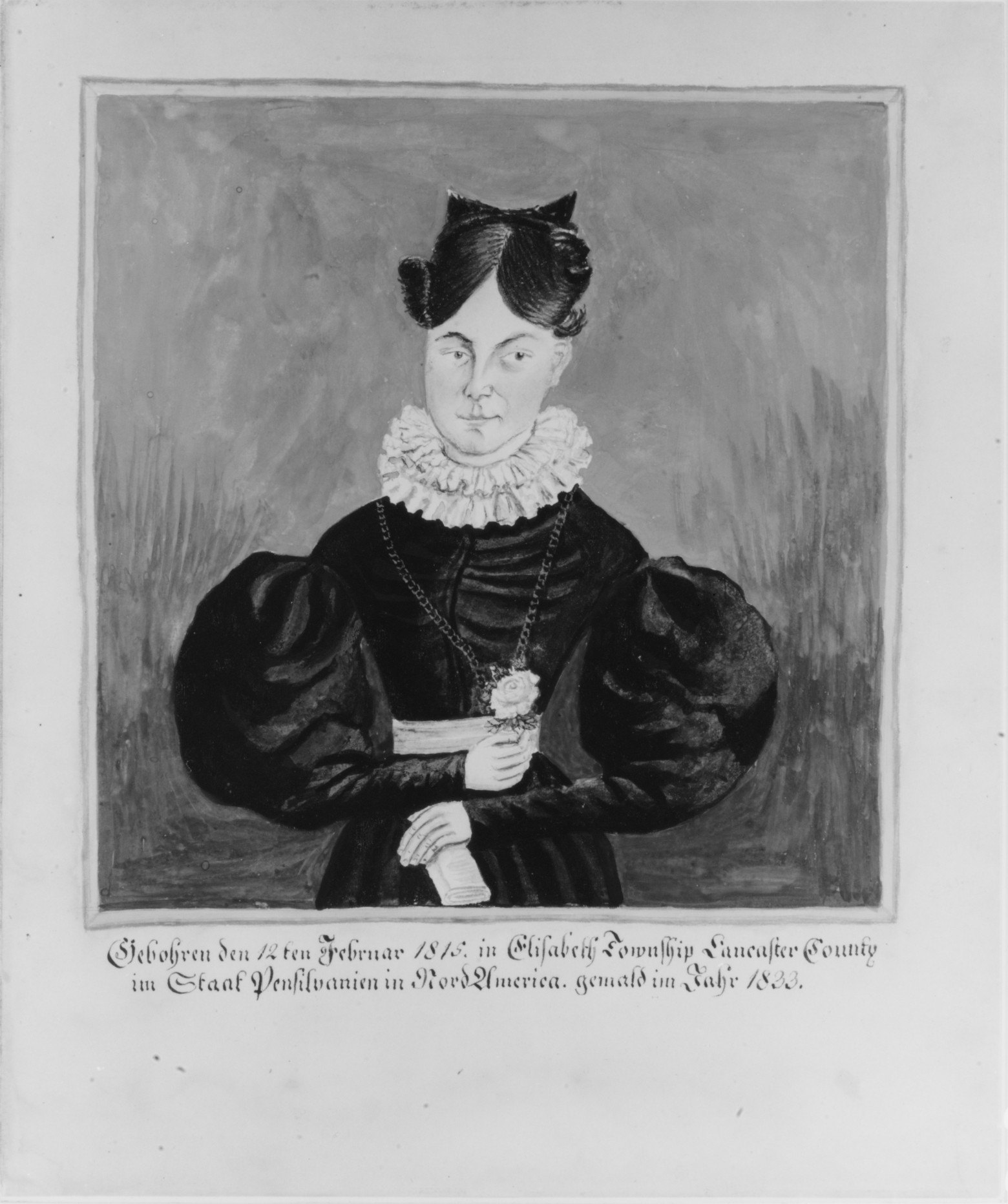
Portrait and Birth Record of Mahala Wechter in fraktur style. Jacob Maentel. Metropolitan Museum of Art.

== See also ==
- New Harmony, Indiana
- German Americans in Baltimore
- Robert Owen
- William Maclure
