= Working Men's Institute (New Harmony, Indiana) =

Historic library and museum in Indiana

Working Men’s Institute
- 38.1286°N 87.9363°W
- Location: New Harmony, Indiana, United States
- Type: Public library, museum, archives
- Established: 1838

Other information
- Website: workingmensinstitute.org

The Working Men's Institute (WMI) is a historic library and museum in New Harmony, Indiana. Founded in 1838 by geologist and philanthropist William Maclure, it is the oldest continuously operating public library in Indiana. The Institute continues to function as a library, museum, and archival center, preserving New Harmony's cultural and educational legacy.

== History ==
The Working Men's Institute was established in 1838 through the support of William Maclure, who had been associated with Robert Owen’s utopian community in New Harmony. Maclure believed in providing “useful knowledge to those who labor with their hands,” and he endowed dozens of similar institutes throughout Indiana and Illinois. At its peak, there were more than 140 Working Men's Institutes in Indiana and 16 in Illinois, but New Harmony's is the only one still in operation.

The present Romanesque Revival building was completed in 1894 and continues to house the Institute today.

== Collections and services ==
The Institute functions as a public library serving residents of Posey County, Indiana, offering books, periodicals, and electronic resources. It also maintains special collections including rare volumes, manuscripts, and genealogical records.

Its museum on the second floor contains artifacts from the Harmonist and Owenite periods of New Harmony, Native American artifacts, and natural history specimens. The museum also hosts rotating exhibits. In 2016, the exhibit Crossroads of Geology was installed to highlight the history of geological science and Maclure's contributions.

== Significance ==
The Working Men's Institute is recognized as Indiana's oldest continuously operating public library and as the last surviving institution of its kind founded by Maclure. It represents an early American example of publicly accessible education modeled after the European Mechanics' Institutes, intended to promote self-improvement among working people.

== See also ==
- Utopian socialism
