= New Harmony's Atheneum =

Coordinates: 38.131811°N 87.938545°W

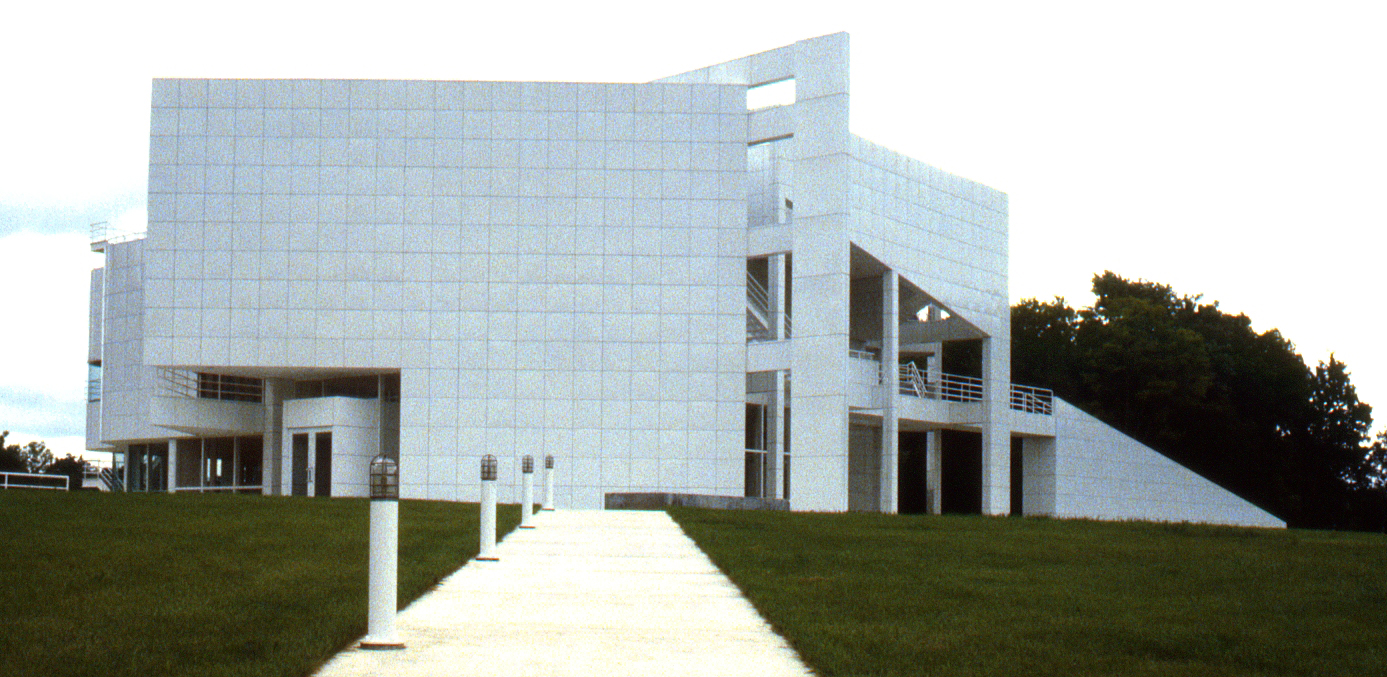
The Atheneum in New Harmony, Indiana.

New Harmony's Atheneum is the visitor center for New Harmony, Indiana. It is named for the Greek Athenaion, a temple dedicated to Athena in ancient Greece. Funded by the Indianapolis Lilly Endowment in 1976, with the help of the Krannert Charitable Trust, it opened on October 10, 1979.

The architect was Richard Meier, whose other works include the Getty Center in Los Angeles, California. When it opened in 1979 it won a Progressive Architecture Award, and in 1982 won an American Institute of Architects (AIA) Honor Award. In 2008 it won the AIA's prestigious Twenty-five Year Award, which is given to no more than one building per year. Architect Peter Eisenman nominated the Atheneum for this award because it was "a wonderfully pure example of the recurring themes among (Meier's) substantial oeuvre; it is a classic 'Meier' design."

The Atheneum is designed so that visitors have to go a specific way through the building, leading out into New Harmony itself. The three-story building's ramp and overlaying grids provide frequent views of the town and countryside.

As a visitor center for New Harmony, it includes a 9-minute movie on the history of New Harmony in its 200-seat auditorium. There are four galleries. The first hosts a gift shop. The second gallery discusses the various individuals in New Harmony's history and hosts a 1/32 scale copy of the Harmonist Brick Church. The third gallery has a 1 inch = 10 feet (1:120) scale of New Harmony in 1824, made during the filming of the movie. The fourth is closed to the public.

Tours of Historic New Harmony, a collection of buildings of historical significance administered by the University of Southern Indiana system, begin at the Atheneum.
