= David Dale Owen =

American geologist (1807–1860)

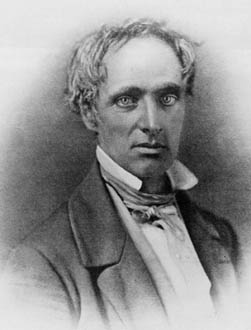
- David Dale Owen
- Born: 24 June 1807; New Lanark, South Lanarkshire, Scotland
- Died: 13 November 1860 (aged 53); New Harmony, Posey County, Indiana
- Occupation: Geologist
- Spouse: Caroline Charlotte Neef
- Children: Col. Alfred Dale Owen (1841); William Herschel Owen (1847); Nina Dale Owen (1849); Anna Owen
- Parent(s): Ann (or Anne) Caroline Dale and Robert Owen

David Dale Owen (24 June 1807 – 13 November 1860) was a prominent American geologist who conducted the first geological surveys of Indiana, Kentucky, Arkansas, Wisconsin, Iowa and Minnesota. Owen served as the first state geologist for three states: Kentucky (1854–57), Arkansas (1857–59), and Indiana (1837–39 and 1859–60). His first geological work was as an assistant mapping the geology of Tennessee in 1836. In addition, Owen was appointed as a U.S. geologist in 1839 and led federal surveys of Iowa, Wisconsin, and northern Illinois (1839–40) and in the Upper Midwest (1847–1851). Owen's greatest legacy lies in the eleven volumes of published reports from his state and federal geological surveys, which increased the general knowledge and understanding of American geology, the structural geology and paleontology of the United States, and the mineral wealth of the Midwestern states. Owen's most significant contribution to the field of geology was identifying and naming major geological formations of the Mississippi River Valley and placing them in relative position on a geological timeline. He also helped to standardize the nomenclature of geological structures in the Midwest.

David Dale was the third surviving son of Robert Owen, a Welsh-born socialist reformer who established a social experiment at New Harmony, Indiana. The experiment failed within few years, but David Dale and his three brothers, Robert Dale Owen, William, and Richard Dale Owen, as well as their sister, Jane Dale Owen Fauntleroy, established a permanent home at New Harmony. Owen amassed an extensive personal collection of natural history specimens at New Harmony, as well as a geological laboratory and museum that served as the headquarters of the U.S. Geological Survey until 1856. In addition to his geological survey work, Owen had a minor role in the preliminary design of the Smithsonian Institution Building in Washington, D.C., and recommended the distinctive, dark-red Seneca Creek sandstone that was used in its construction.

== Early life and education ==
David Dale Owen was born in Lanarkshire, Scotland, on 24 June 1807, to Ann (or Anne) Caroline Dale and Robert Owen. His mother was the daughter of David Dale, a wealthy Scottish textile manufacturer. His Welsh-born father, a part-owner and manager of the New Lanark Mills at New Lanark, Scotland, was a noted socialist reformer and philanthropist who established experimental utopian communities in the United States and the United Kingdom. David Dale, who was named for his maternal grandfather and called Dale, was the fourth son of the family's eight children; the eldest son died in infancy. His six surviving siblings (three brothers and three sisters) were Robert Dale, William, Ann (or Anne) Caroline, Jane Dale, Richard, and Mary.

Owen grew up at Braxfield House, the Owen family's 40-acre (16-hectare) estate in Lanarkshire. Like his brothers, Owen was privately tutored at home before he was sent as a teenager to Philipp Emanuel von Fellenberg's school at Hofwyl, Switzerland. While attending the Swiss school for three years, Owen was exposed to Johann Heinrich Pestalozzi's method of education. He received a broad education, which included instruction in chemistry and natural history. David and his brother, Richard, returned to Scotland in 1826 and continued their education in science under Andrew Ure at the Andersonian Institute at Glasgow.

In 1827, when Owen was about twenty years old, he sailed for America with his father, Robert, and two of his brothers, Robert Dale and Richard. After the party arrived in New York City in January 1828, David immediately went to New Harmony, Indiana, to live at the experimental socialistic community his father has established in 1825. Robert Owen returned to the United Kingdom, but his four surviving sons, David, Robert Dale, William, and Richard, along with their sister, Jane, became residents of the Owenite community at New Harmony and remained in Indiana, even after the social experiment failed in the late 1820s. Although he was frequently absent while pursuing his education and for his professional work, David Dale Owen established a permanent residence and a laboratory in New Harmony.

In 1830 he spent a year painting and drawing in New York City, where his brother, Robert Dale Owen, was living at the time, and the next two years in London. Owen studied science at University of London, where he specialized in chemistry and geology, and returned to the United States in 1833. He began studying medicine at the Ohio Medical College in Cincinnati in 1835 and earned a medical degree from the college in 1837. Owen never established a medical practice. Instead, he returned to New Harmony, Indiana, in 1837 to begin his career as a natural scientist.

In addition to his formal training in science and medicine, it is likely that Owen became interested in geology because of his father's business partnership with geologist William Maclure, a well-known educator and scientist who served as president of the Academy of Natural Sciences of Philadelphia from 1817 to 1840, and Gerhard Troost, a Dutch geologist, mineralogist, zoologist, and chemist. Both men arrived at New Harmony in 1825.

== Marriage and family ==
Owen married Caroline Neef (1815–1854), a daughter of New Harmony residents Louise and Joseph Neef, in a triple ceremony on 23 March 1837. Owen's brother, Richard, married Caroline's sister, Anne, and his brother, William, married Mary Bolton in the same ceremony.

David and Caroline Owen had four children: Alfred D. (b. 1841), Anna (1843–1912), William H. (1847–1896), and Nina Dale (1849–1911). Owen's granddaughter, Caroline Dale (Parke) Snedeker (b. 1871), was the daughter of Nina Dale (Owen) and Charles Parke and the author of The Coward of Thermopylae, and Seth Way.

== Career ==
From 1837 to his death in 1860, Owen conducted geological surveys in the Midwestern United States, including the first geological surveys of Indiana, Kentucky, Arkansas, Wisconsin, Iowa and Minnesota. Through this work he established himself as a leading authority on the region's geology. Owen became the first state geologist of three states: Kentucky (1854–57), Arkansas (1857–59), and Indiana (1837–39 and 1850–60). He also served as a federal geologist for the U.S. Geological Survey.

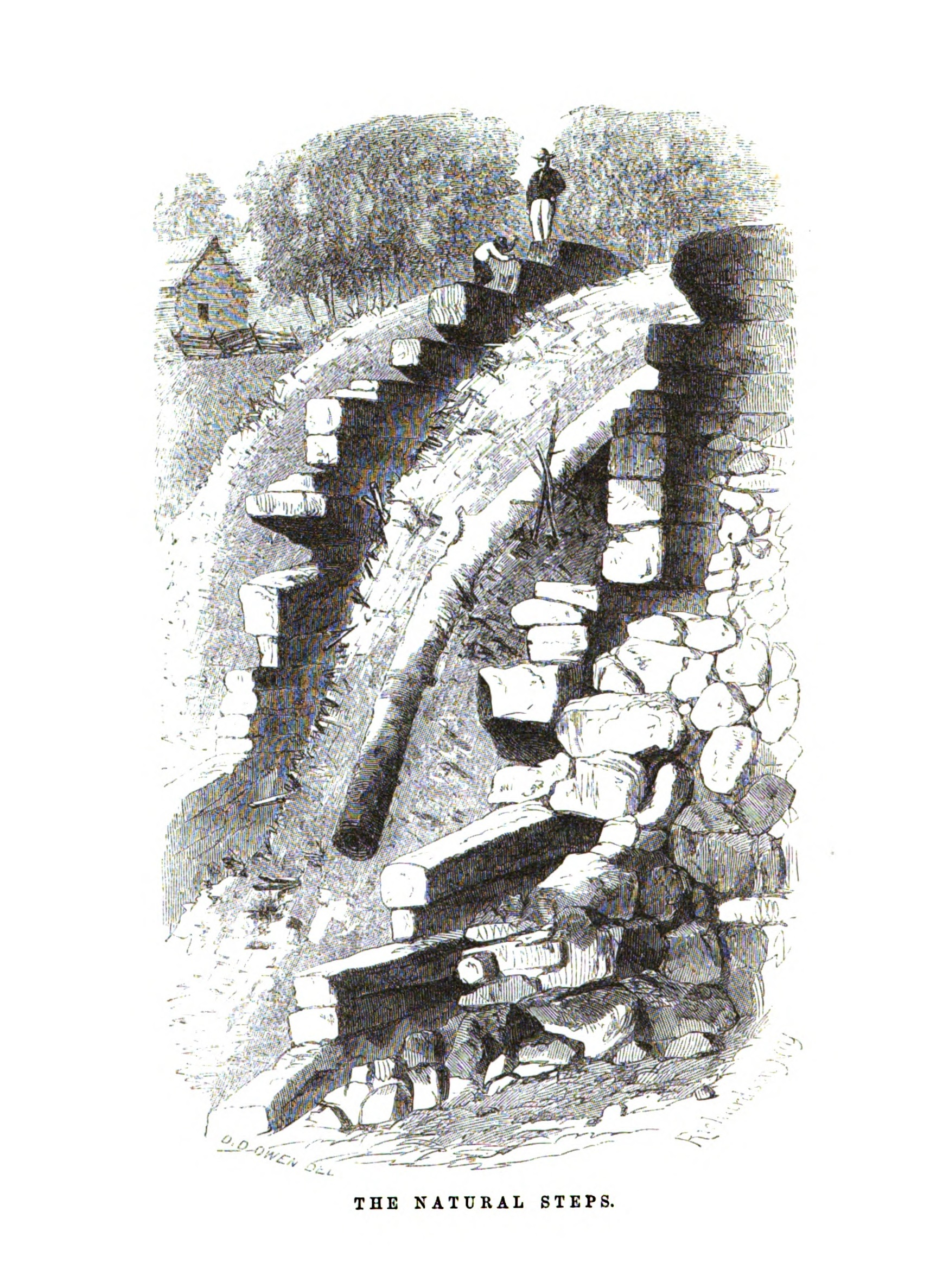
Illustration of Natural Steps, Arkansas

=== Early geological surveys ===
Owen's first geological work occurred in 1836 as an assistant mapping the geology of Tennessee with Gerald Troost, a friend from New Harmony.

In 1837 the Indiana General Assembly commissioned Owen to conduct the first geological survey of the state. In March 1837 Indiana governor Noah Noble appointed him as the first state geologist of Indiana. For his geological services Owen earned a salary of $1,500 per year and a $250 expense allowance. During the first year of the survey, Owen traveled about a thousand miles on horseback to examine the state's geology, including its stone and coal resources. Owen submitted two reports of this initial survey to the state legislature. These early reports served as the basis for the research of other Indiana state geologists who succeeded him. In March 1838 Owen was reappointed for another year of survey research in the state.

=== Federal and state geologist ===
In July 1839 Owen received an appointment as the U.S. geologist. In this role he led federal surveys from 1839 to 1840 and from 1847 to 1851 of the Midwestern United States, which included Iowa, Missouri, Wisconsin, Minnesota, and part of northern Illinois. His reports for these pioneering surveys, in addition to other surveys he made before his death in 1860, established his reputation as one of the era's leading experts on the geology of the Middle West.

From 1839 to 1840 Owen conducted surveys in Iowa, Wisconsin, and northern Illinois. In 1845 he was appointed to survey the Chippewa Land District in the Upper Mississippi River Valley. He also served as the director of a geological expedition in Wisconsin and Iowa in 1847 and began a three-year geological survey of Minnesota in 1849. The surveys of Wisconsin, Iowa, and Minnesota, as well as the subsequent publication of the related reports, were Owen's major achievements and the high point of his career.

The final six years of Owen's life (1854–60), were especially busy. He served as the state geologist for Kentucky (1854–57), Arkansas (1857–59), and returned to Indiana (1859–60) to supervise geological surveys for each of these states. Because the Kentucky and Arkansas surveys were still underway, Owen's brother, Richard, conducted most of the fieldwork for the Indiana survey.

=== Smithsonian Institution contributions ===
In addition to his geological survey work, Owen had a minor role in the preliminary design of the Smithsonian Institution Building in Washington, D.C. In 1846 he also recommended the Seneca Quarry's distinctive, dark-red Seneca Creek sandstone that was used in its construction. The following year Owen identified a quarry at Bull Run, twenty-three miles from nation's capital, that provided the stone for the project.

David Owen and architect Robert Mills developed preliminary plans for the Smithsonian Institution's new building while his brother, U.S. Congressman Robert Dale Owen, introduced and helped to secure passage of the bill that founded the Smithsonian Institution in 1846, served on the Institution's first Board of Regents, and chaired its Building Committee. Although Owen's early drawings were not the final choice for the project, they influenced the designs that other architects developed. Owen also donated his services as a consultant without compensation to the Institution's Board of Regents and helped architect James Renwick Jr., whose design was selected for the building, prepare drawings for its chemistry department.

=== Natural history laboratory and specimen collection ===
In addition to his work in the field, Owen established a geological laboratory and museum at New Harmony. The laboratory served as the headquarters of the U.S. Geological Survey until 1856, when the federal survey's headquarters were relocated to the newly completed Smithsonian Institution Building in Washington, D.C.

Over the years Owen amassed a personal collection of specimens at New Harmony that was "virtually unrivalled" west of the Allegheny Mountains. At the time of Owen's death in 1860, his museum at New Harmony included some 85,000 items. The collection included rocks, fossils, paleological specimens, minerals, and crystals, but most of these specimens have been lost or destroyed. His rivals, especially Joseph Granville Norwood, his colleague and one-time assistant, criticized Owen for enlarging his personal collection of specimens while working on public surveys. Walter B. Hendrickson, an Owen biographer, considers the criticism "unjustified" because Owen complied with the survey instructions he received and provided collections of specimens when he was asked to do so.

Owen shipped eighteen boxes of specimens to Washington, D.C., where they became part collections of the Smithsonian Institution. However, by the mid-1940s, the identity of the collection that Owen donated to the national museum had been lost and could no longer be specifically attributed to him. Owen also provided specimens for a museum at Frankfort, Kentucky, and established a collections of specimens at Little Rock, Arkansas, but Hendrickson noted that "the best of the specimens found their way into the New Harmony museum." Due to the outbreak of American Civil War and for other reasons, author Clark Kimberling believes it is unlikely that the collections sent to Kentucky and Arkansas have survived. Some of Owen's specimens became part of the Gurley Collection at the University of Chicago and are housed at the Field Museum of Natural History in Chicago.

In 1869 the Owen family sold Owen's collection of specimens, called the "Owen Cabinet," to the State of Indiana. The natural collection was moved to a museum on a former site of the Indiana University campus in Bloomington. In July 1883 a fire destroyed IU's main building along with the museum that housed the Owen collection. About a thousand of the specimens were saved, but most of these were sent to the Smithsonian Institution in Washington, D.C. Twenty-two items from the collection were eventually housed in Owen Hall, an IU building erected in the 1880s at Dunn's Woods on the present-day campus in Bloomington.

== Death and legacy ==
Owen died on 13 November 1860, at New Harmony, Indiana, at the age of fifty-three. His remains are interred at New Harmony.

Owen's greatest legacy lies in the eleven volumes of published reports from his state and federal geological surveys. His surveys reports increased the general knowledge and understanding of American geology, the structural geology and paleontology of the United States, and the mineral wealth of the Midwestern United States. Owen provided detailed reports of his observations, which aided later geologists in their research; however, some of his interpretations, inferences, and theories derived from his observations and research were incorrect. Owen's most significant contribution to the field was identifying and naming major geological formations of the Mississippi River Valley and placing them in relative position on a geological timeline. Owen also helped standardize the nomenclature of geological structures in the Midwest.

Another Owen legacy was the geologists he trained. These men include John Evans, a surveyor for the western United States; Fielding Bradford Meek, the first full-time paleontologist at the Smithsonian Institution; Joseph Granville Norwood, one of Owen's colleagues, coauthors, and the first state geologist of Illinois (1851–58); Edward T. Cox, who later surveyed Indiana; C. C. Parry, a botanist of Iowa; Benjamin Franklin Shumard, appointed state geologist of Texas; Amos Henry Worthen, the second state geologist of Illinois and the first curator of the Illinois State Museum; and Owen's younger brother, Richard, who succeeded him to become the second state geologist of Indiana.

Most sources report that Owen Hall, located on the Indiana University campus in Bloomington, Indiana, was named in honor of Owen's brother, Richard, who was a former state geologist and professor at IU. However, other sources believe that the building, which originally housed the university's department of natural sciences and its museum, was named after three of the Owen brothers: David Dale, Richard, and Robert Dale Owen. Owen Hall has been converted to house the office of IU's chancellor.

== Selected published works ==
=== Geological survey reports ===
- First Report of a Geological Reconnaissance of the Northern Counties of Arkansas, made during the Years 1857 and 1858 (Little Rock, 1858)
- Second Report of a Geological Reconnaissance of the Middle and Southern Counties of Arkansas, made during the Years 1859 and 1860 (Philadelphia, 1860)
- Report of a Geological Reconnaissance of the State of Indiana; Made in the Year 1837, in Conformity to an Order of the Legislature (Indianapolis, 1838; reprinted in 1839, 1853, 1859)
- Second Report of a Geological Survey of the State of Indiana, Made in the Year 1838, in Conformity to an Order of the Legislature (Indianapolis, 1839) Revised and printed as Continuation of a Report of a Geological Reconnaissance of the State of Indiana, Made in the Year 1838, in Conformity to an Order of the Legislature (Indianapolis, 1859)
- Condensed Report of the Geological and Agricultural Survey of the State of Indiana, for 1859 and 1860 (Indianapolis, 1861)
- Report of the Geological Survey in Kentucky, Made during the Years 1854 and 1855 (Frankfort, 1856)
- Second Report of the Geological Survey in Kentucky, Made during the Years 1856 and 1857 (Frankfort, 1857)
- Third Report of the Geological Survey in Kentucky, Made during the Years 1856 and 1857 (Frankfort, 1857)
- Fourth Report of the Geological Survey in Kentucky, Made during the Years 1858 and 1859 (Frankfort, 1861)
- Report of a Geological Survey of the Chippewa Land District of Wisconsin; and Incidentally, of a Portion of the Kickapoo Country, and of a Part of Iowa and of Minnesota Territory. Made under Instructions from the United States Treasury Department (Senate Executive Documents, 30 Congress, 1 session, 7: no. 57)
- Report of a Geological Survey of Wisconsin, Iowa, and Minnesota; and Incidentally of a Portion of Nebraska Territory. Made under Instructions from the United States Treasury Department (Philadelphia, 1852)
