= Maclure Glacier =

Glacier in California, United States

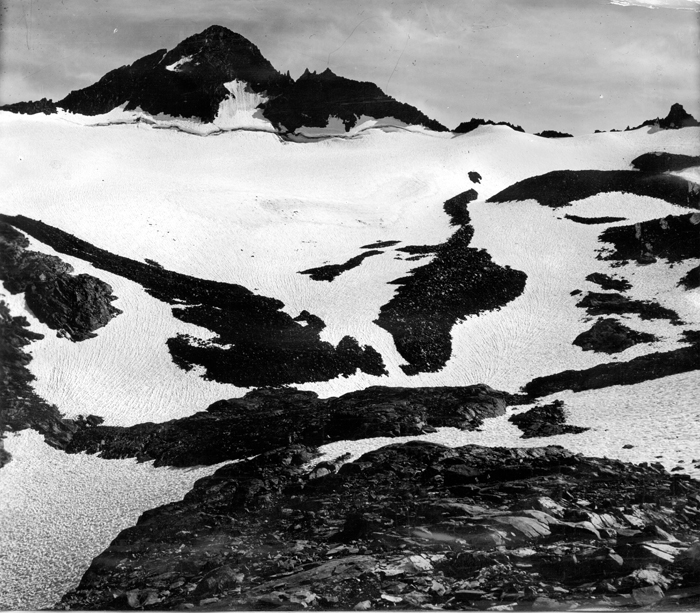
- Mount Maclure and Maclure Glacier. Circa 1917

- Location within California
- Type: Mountain glacier
- Location: Mount Maclure, Yosemite National Park, Tuolumne County, California, U.S.
- Coordinates: 37°44′48″N 119°16′58″W
- Area: .08 sq mi (0.21 km^{2})
- Length: .20 mi (0.32 km)
- Terminus: Talus
- Status: Retreating

Maclure Glacier (also McClure Glacier) is on Mount Maclure in the Sierra Nevada crest of Yosemite National Park in Tuolumne County, California, United States. The glacier is named after William Maclure. Like most glaciers in the Sierra Nevada, Maclure Glacier is a small cirque glacier that is .20 mi (0.32 km) long and covers an area of only .08 sq mi (0.21 km^{2}). The mean elevation of the glacier is around 11,400 ft (3,500 m). Both the Maclure Glacier and the Lyell Glacier, located nearby on Mount Lyell, have retreated since their first discovery.

== See also ==
- List of glaciers in the United States
