= Joseph Granville Norwood =

American physician & scientist (1807-1895)

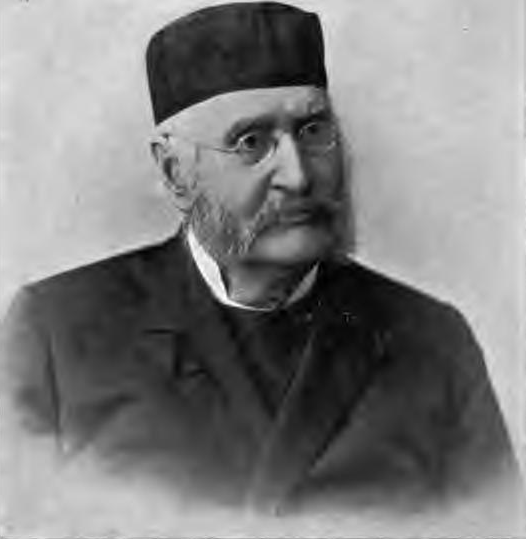
- Joseph Granville Norwood
- Born: December 20, 1807; Woodford County, Kentucky
- Died: May 6, 1895 (aged 87); Columbia, Missouri
- Occupation(s): Physician, geologist, medical academician.
- Known for: First dean of University of Missouri medical school.

Joseph Granville Norwood (December 20, 1807 – May 6, 1895) was a medical doctor and scientist who served in a variety of government capacities in the geological exploration of the upper Midwest, and finished his career as a professor of medicine and first dean of the medical school at the University of Missouri in Columbia, Missouri.

== Medicine ==
In his early adulthood, Norwood worked as a printer, and studied science and medicine. In 1836, upon completion of a thesis on spinal diseases, he graduated from Transylvania Medical College in Lexington. In 1840 he was appointed chair of the surgery department of the Madison Medical Institute in Indiana, and from 1843 to 1847 he was chair of the medical school at St. Louis University.

== Geologist ==
Beginning in 1847, he shifted careers to geology. From 1847 to 1851 he worked for David Dale Owen performing field survey throughout Wisconsin Territory and Iowa. In 1851 he was appointed Illinois State Geologist. During this period, he was a middleman in the discovery of the first dire wolf specimen. In 1858 he was dismissed from the Illinois job under acrimonious and politically motivated circumstances. He was immediately offered and accepted the same position for the State of Missouri.

== Academia ==
From 1860 to 1880, Norwood's career shifted to academia when he was offered the position of professor of natural sciences at the University of Missouri. In 1872 he was appointed dean of the new School of Medicine, the first public school of medicine west of the Mississippi. In 1880 his health declined after a fall, and until his death in 1895 he held the title of professor emeritus in physics. When he died he was given full honors by the university, and in 1904 Norwood Hall at the Missouri University of Science and Technology was named for him. Throughout his career Norwood was a prolific publisher, writing on subjects ranging from medicine to chemistry to geology.

Norwood was married twice, to Louisa Taylor and later to Mary Francis Pugh. He had three children by the first marriage and eight by the second marriage. His son Charles Norwood became a Kentucky State Geologist.
