= Mount Maclure =

Mountain in California, United States

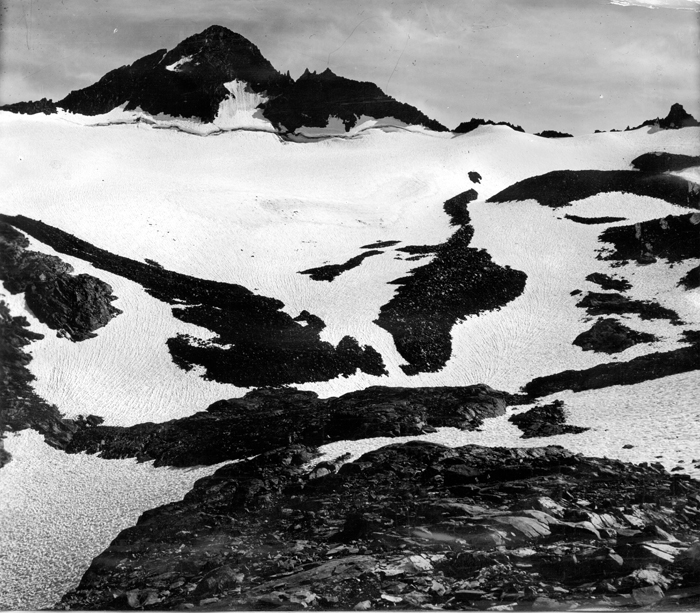
- Mount Maclure and Maclure Glacier

Highest point
- Elevation: 12,886+ ft (3,928+ m) NAVD 88
- Prominence: 440 ft (134 m)
- Listing: Sierra Peaks Section; Western States Climbers peak
- Coordinates: 37°44′37″N 119°16′54″W

Naming
- Etymology: William Maclure

Geography
- Location within California
- Location: Madera and Tuolumne counties, California, U.S.
- Parent range: Cathedral Range, Sierra Nevada
- Topo map: USGS Mount Lyell

Climbing
- First ascent: 1883 by Hillard Johnson
- Easiest route: Southeast ridge, Exposed scramble (class 3-4)

Mount Maclure is the nearest neighbor to Mount Lyell, the highest point in Yosemite National Park. Mount Maclure is the fifth-highest mountain of Yosemite. Mount Maclure is located at the southeast end of the Cathedral Range, about 0.6 miles (0.97 km) northwest of Lyell. The summit is on the boundary between Madera and Tuolumne counties which is also the boundary between the park and the Ansel Adams Wilderness. It was named in honor of William Maclure, a pioneer in American geology who produced the first geological maps of the United States. Maclure Glacier, one of the last remaining glaciers in Yosemite, is situated on the mountain's northern flank.

The easiest climbing route leaves the John Muir Trail about 8.5 miles (14 km) south of Tuolumne Meadows and traverses the Maclure Glacier to the summit.

== See also ==
- Rodgers Peak (California)
- Simmons Peak
