= Shalev =

Shalev may refer to:

== People ==
=== Given name ===
- Shalev Menashe (born 1982), Israeli footballer

=== Surname ===
- Aner Shalev (born 1958), Israeli mathematics professor
- Avner Shalev (born 1939), Israeli chairman of the Yad Vashem Directorate
- Chemi Shalev (born 1953), Israeli journalist and political analyst
- Gabriela Shalev (born 1941), Israeli jurist and Israeli ambassador to the United Nations
- Meir Shalev (1948–2023), Israeli writer
- Sarah Marom-Shalev (born 1934), Israeli politician
- Varda Shalev (born 1959), Israeli academic and physician
- Zeruya Shalev (born 1959), Israeli author
