= Roofless Church =

Open air interdenominational church in Indiana, USA

Coordinates: 38°07′55″N 87°56′08″W

A corner of the Roofless Church, housing the statue The descent of the Holy Spirit

The Roofless Church in New Harmony, Indiana, is an open air interdenominational church designed by Philip Johnson and dedicated in 1960. The church was commissioned by Jane Blaffer Owen, the wife of a descendant of Robert Owen (the founder of New Harmony). It is an open park surrounded by a wall. There is one roof-like structure inside the compound, which is a cover for the statue The descent of the Holy Spirit by Jacques Lipchitz.

== Features ==
The walls of the church are made of brick, and form a 9,800 square ft. rectangle, which is paved with limestone except for areas designated for plants. A gilded and adorned gate (also done by Lipchitz) is on the east side, with a secondary gate in the west wall. The roof-like structure over Lipchitz's sculpture is a shingled baldachin which, as noted by the New Harmony chronicler Don Blair, resembles an upside-down rose bud. Since the original dedication of the church, further sculptures have been added inside the walls.

In 2016, a restoration effort was assembled, and the gate ornaments were re-gilded with gold leaf.
