= Frances Morrison =

Frances Morrison (January 1807 – 29 August 1898) was a British socialist activist.

Born in Petworth, West Sussex, as Frances Cooper, she was the illegitimate daughter of a farm worker. Her mother moved to Pershore in Worcestershire with a new husband shortly after Frances' birth, and Frances was brought up by a grandmother until she reached adolescence, when she returned to her mother's care. For some years, she attended a boarding school in Bury St Edmunds. She moved to Newcastle upon Tyne when she was fifteen, with the house painter James Morrison, the two marrying only when she became pregnant, four or five years later.

Morrison had four daughters, all the while running a newsagent shop in Birmingham. She began taking an interest in politics, supported by her husband, who became the editor of radical newspapers which supported Robert Owen's socialist movement. Frances wrote numerous articles for the most important of these papers, The Pioneer. In 1838, she published "The Influence of the Present Marriage system upon the Character and Interests of Females, contrasted with that proposed by Robert Owen Esq.", in which she argued that in Owen's utopian communities, marriage laws would be strictly enforced, to the benefit of women.

James died late in the 1830s, and Owenites raised enough funds for Frances to buy a shop to support her family, but this proved difficult, and she instead moved to Salford to work in the Owenite Social Institution. She travelled frequently to speak on Owen's theories, particularly their implications for women, before she found work as a teacher in Hulme. A woman claiming to be her began lecturing on anti-socialist topics, but J. Sever claimed that this was an impostor, and that Morrison held Owenite views until her death.

Morrison married a cook named Robert Sutton in about 1850, and had another daughter. Most of her children emigrated to Australia, but she remained living with one daughter after Sutton's death.
