= Amos Henry Worthen =

American paleontologist (1813–1888)

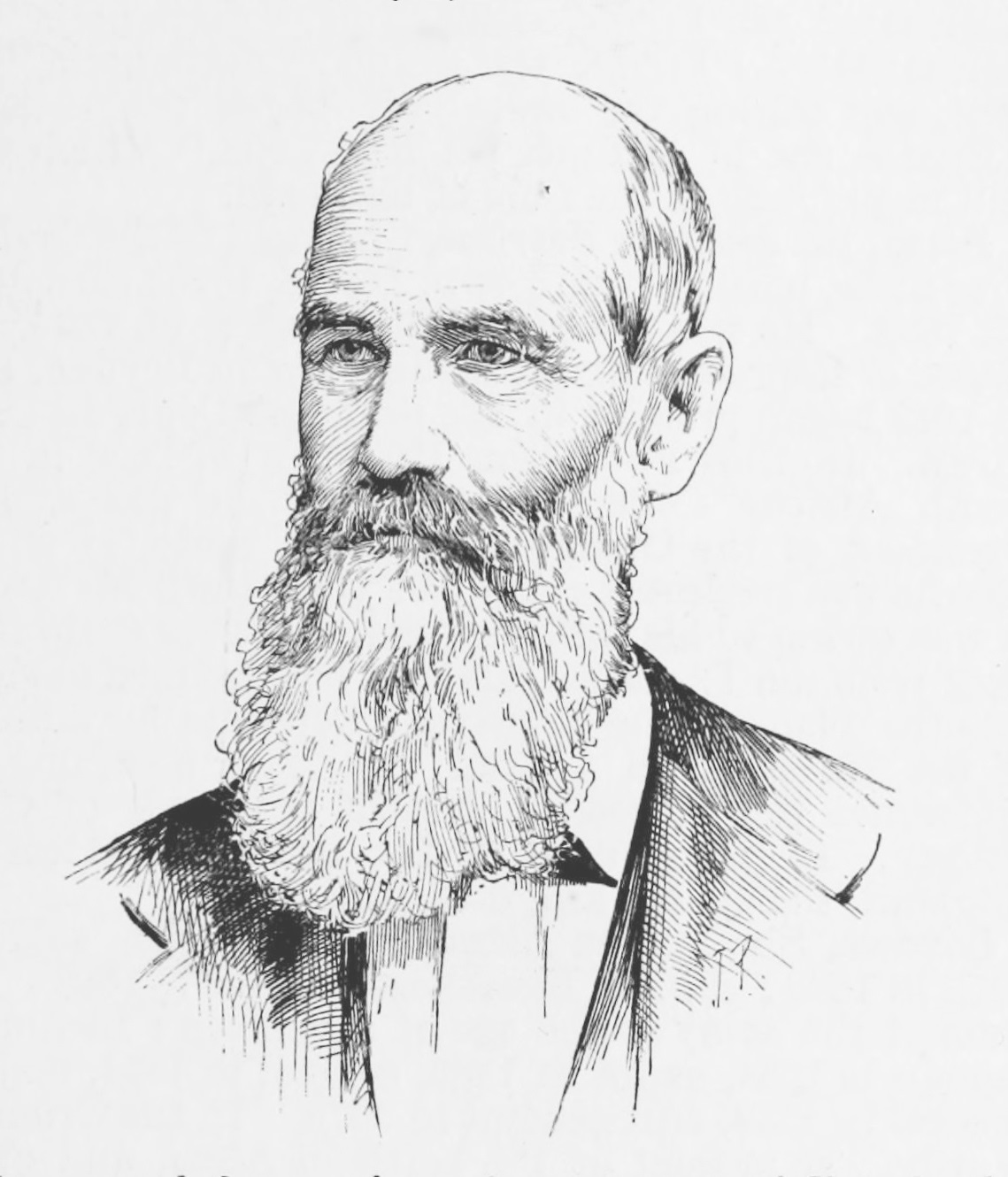
- Born: October 31, 1813; Bradford, Vermont
- Died: May 6, 1888 (aged 74); Warsaw, Illinois
- Scientific career
- Fields: Geology, Paleontology
- Institutions: Illinois State Museum

Amos Henry Worthen (1813–1888) was an American geologist and paleontologist from Illinois. He was the second state geologist of Illinois and the first curator of the Illinois State Museum. He was a fellow of the American Association for the Advancement of Science and a member of the American Philosophical Society (1863) and the National Academy of Sciences.
