= William Maclure =

18th/19th-century American geologist and cartographer

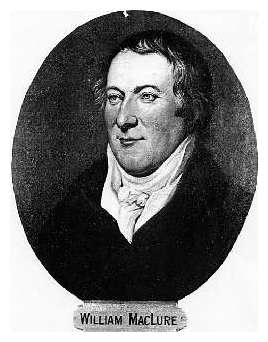
- William Maclure
- Born: 27 October 1763; Ayr, Scotland
- Died: 23 March 1840 (aged 76); San Ángel, Mexico
- Citizenship: American
- Known for: First geological map of America 1809, and New Harmony Society
- Scientific career
- Fields: geology, education, philanthropy
- Workplaces: Academy of Natural Sciences of Philadelphia

William Maclure (27 October 1763 – 23 March 1840) was an Americanized Scottish geologist, cartographer and philanthropist. He is known as the 'father of American geology'. As a social experimenter on new types of community life, he collaborated with British social reformer Robert Owen, (1771–1854), in the utopian settlement of New Harmony in Indiana, United States.

Maclure had a highly successful mercantile career, making a fortune that allowed him to retire in 1797 at the early age of 34 to pursue his scientific, geological and other interests. In 1809 he made the earliest attempt at a geological map of the United States of America.

== Biography ==
=== Early life, business, and education ===
Maclure was born in 1763 in Ayr, Scotland.

After a brief visit to New York City in 1782, he began work with the merchants Miller, Hart & Co, who traded and shipped goods to and from America. Maclure was based in the London office but regularly travelled to France and Ireland on business. In 1796 business affairs took him to Virginia, which he thereafter made his home. In 1803 he visited France as one of the commissioners appointed to settle the claims of American citizens on the French government; and during the few years then spent in Europe he applied himself with enthusiasm to the study of geology. While residing in Switzerland, he became impressed with what is now called the Pestalozzi School System, from Swiss pedagogist Johann Heinrich Pestalozzi (1746–1827).

=== Geological map ===
Maclure visit to Spain in 1808; this visit ended abruptly by the outbreak of the Peninsular War. After his return home in 1808 he commenced the self-imposed task of making a geological survey of the United States. Almost every state in the Union was traversed and mapped by him, the Allegheny Mountains being crossed and recrossed some 50 times. The results of his unaided labours were submitted to the American Philosophical Society in a memoir entitled Observations on the Geology of the United States explanatory of a Geological Map, and published in the Society's Transactions, together with the first geological map of that country, Maclure's 1809 Geological Map. This antedates William Smith's geological map of England and Wales (with part of Scotland) by six years, although it was constructed using a different classification of rocks.

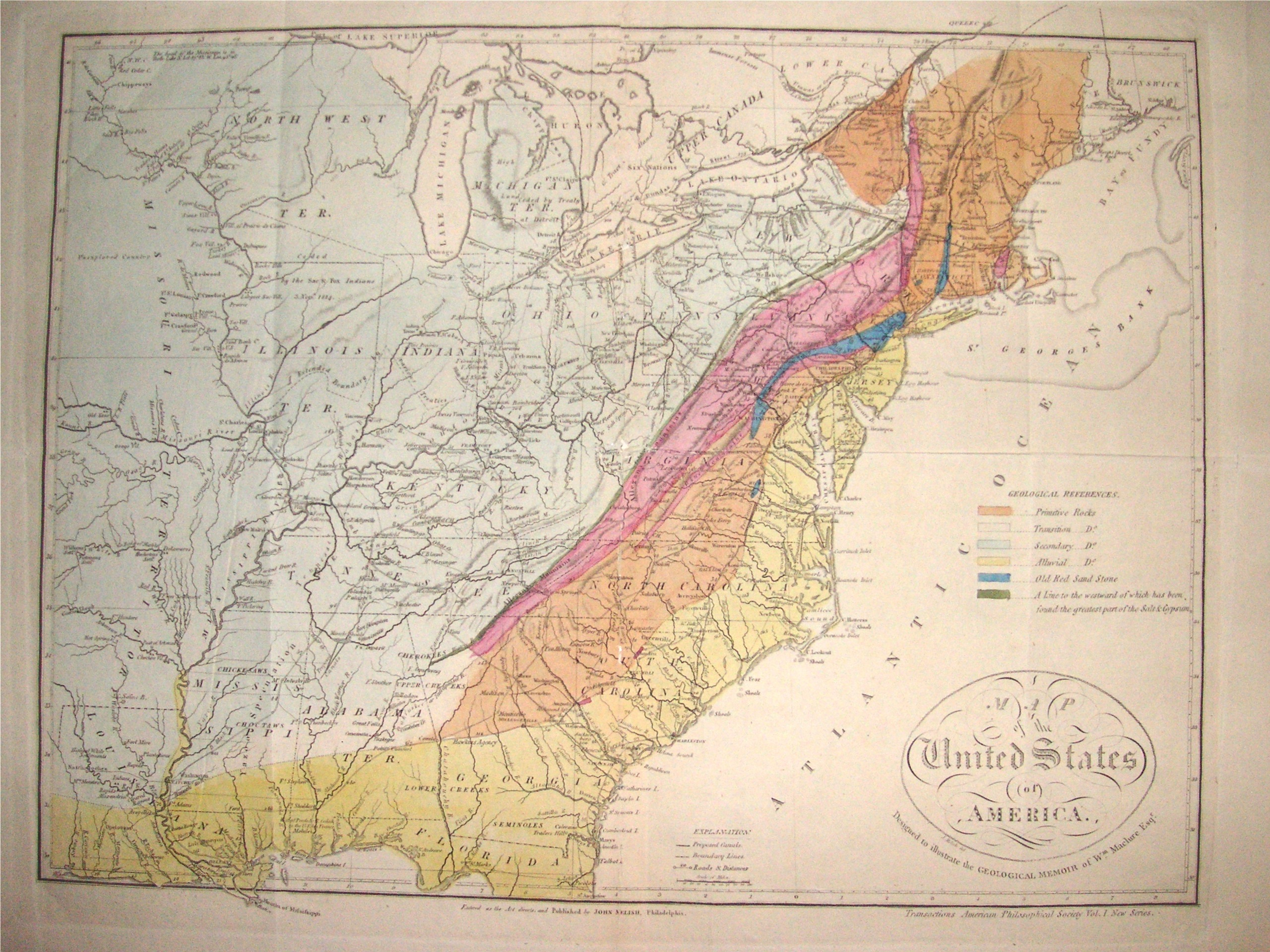
Maclure's Geological Map of the United States, published in 1817

In 1812, while in France, Maclure became a member of the newly founded Academy of Natural Sciences of Philadelphia (ANSP). In 1817 Maclure became president of the ANSP, a post he held for the next 22 years.

In 1817, while residing in Europe, Maclure brought before the same society a revised edition of his map, and his great geological memoir, which he had issued separately, with some additional matter, under the title Observations on the Geology of the United States of America. Subsequent surveys have corroborated the general accuracy of Maclure's observations.

=== Later years ===
In 1820 he visited Spain, because since the restoration of the Constitution in July 1820, Spain was the only liberal country in Europe. He attempted to establish an agricultural college near the city of Alicante, but in 1823 the invasion of the French army, the Hundred Thousand Sons of Saint Louis, imposed absolutism again and on 2 May 1824, he abandoned Alicante. Returning to America in 1824, he settled for some years at New Harmony, Indiana, seeking to develop his vision of the agricultural college. Failing health ultimately required him to relinquish the attempt and to seek (in 1827) a more congenial climate in Mexico. There, in 1840, at San Ángel, he died aged 77. His will provided for a trust fund consisting of most of his property. Under the terms of the Trust, 160 workingmen's libraries were established. The treatment of Maclure's burial site in Mexico was bereft of the honors due the respected humanitarian and geologist.

The burial site of William Maclure

At the distance of a few feet from them, repose the remains of William McClure, a countryman, dear to American science. The Academy of Natural Sciences at Philadelphia, of which he was so long the President and benefactor, erected a small marble monument over his grave, and surrounded it with an iron rail. A short time before I left Mexico, the rail was torn down, the monument upset, and, on the same night, the newly-buried body of a Scotchman was disinterred, stripped of its clothes, and thrown over the wall of the cemetery!

— Brantz Mayer
- Summary of the second phase of Maclure's life (after Moore 1947)

Date	Event
1778–1797 Mercantile career, based in London but with regular contact and travel to America
1796	Emigrated to the United States, settling in Philadelphia and became an American citizen.
1797	Retirement from business (Silliman claims this was 1799, Monroe claims 1803)
1799	Elected to American Philosophical Society. Council 1818–1829.
1803	Member of Spoliation Commission in France.
1803–1805 and subsequent years	Visits to Pestalozzi and other schools and travels and geological work in Europe.
1805	Brought Joseph Neef to Philadelphia to establish first Pestalozzian schools.
1805–1817	One-man geological survey. First report and geological map published 1809, extended and revised 1817.
1812	Member of Academy of Natural Sciences (President 1817–1840).
1817–1819	Exploring trips to Georgia, Florida, and the Lesser Antilles Islands.
1819	First President of American Geological Society
1819–1824	Agricultural and industrial schools at Alicante, Spain.
1824–1828	With a body of teachers and scientists joined Robert Owen's colony at New Harmony. Established Pestalozzian, manual training and industrial schools and scientific center and library.
1826	Established New Harmony Educational Society and night-school for adults.
1827	With Thomas Say spent winter in Mexico.
1828	Health failing. Attended meeting of American Geological Society for the last time.
1828	Founded New Harmony Disseminator of Useful Knowledge at Industrial School.
1828–1840	Residence in Mexico.
1831	Publication of Opinions on Various Subjects.
1836	Serious illness. Elected a member of the American Antiquarian Society
1837	Rejuvenated Workingmen's Institute and library.
1840	Death in Mexico, 23 March. Will provided for a trust fund of most of his property under which160 workingmen's libraries were established.

== New Harmony ==
The New Harmony commune in Indiana was a short-lived utopian community. Even after its collapse, it became home to geologists, naturalists, and botanists who were influenced by Maclure. This included the siblings Robert Dale Owen (1801–1877), social reformer; David Dale Owen (1807–1860), geologist, artist; Jane Dale Owen Fauntleroy (1806–1861), educator; and Richard Dale Owen (1810–1890) geologist, first president of Purdue University, Lafayette, Indiana. A formidable group of geologists, social reformers, botanists, paleobotanists, ethnologists and civil engineers interacted at New Harmony.

== Published works ==
- Maclure, W. 1817. Observations on the geology of the West India Islands, from Barbadoes to Santa Cruz, inclusive. Journal of the Academy of Natural Sciences of Philadelphia 1(6), 134–149. (BHL link)
- Maclure, W. 1818. Essay on the formation of rocks, or an inquiry into the probable origin of their present form and structure. Part 1. Journal of the Academy of Natural Sciences of Philadelphia 1(7), 261–276. (BHL link)
- Maclure, W. 1818. Essay on the formation of rocks, or an inquiry into the probable origin of their present form and structure. Part 2. Journal of the Academy of Natural Sciences of Philadelphia 1(7), 285–310. (BHL link)
- Maclure, W. 1818. Essay on the formation of rocks, or an inquiry into the probable origin of their present form and structure. Part 3. Journal of the Academy of Natural Sciences of Philadelphia 1(7), 327–345. (BHL link)
- Maclure, W. 1818. On the geology of the United States of North America, with remarks on the probable effects that may be produced by the decomposition of the different classes of rocks, on the nature and fertility of soils: applied to the different states of the Union agreeably to the accompanying geological map. Transactions of the American Philosophical Society new series 1, 1–92. (BHL link)

== Primary sources ==
The European Journals of William Maclure was a monumental book, describing, charting, and chronicling much of the features of Europe.

== Taxonomic eponyms ==
- Charles Alexandre Lesueur described a genus of fossil gastropods, Maclurites, in honor of Maclure. It is the type genus of Macluritidae, an extinct family of relatively large gastropods known from the Lower Ordovician to Devonian periods. Two other members of the family, Maclurina and Macluritella, also honor Maclure.
- Maclura, a genus of flowering plants in the mulberry family, Moraceae is named in honor of Maclure. The genus includes the inedible Osage-orange, which is used as mosquito repellent and grown throughout the United States as a hedging plant.

== Geological eponyms ==
- Mount Maclure in Yosemite National Park.
- Maclure Glacier, one of the last remaining glaciers in Yosemite National Park.

== See also ==
- Geologic map of Georgia
