= University of Houston School of Theatre and Dance =

Coordinates: 29.725156°N 95.344017°W

University of Houston School of Theatre & Dance
- Type: Public
- Established: 1940
- Affiliations: University of Houston; CLASS
- Director: Sharon Ott
- Faculty: 30
- Administrative staff: 15
- Students: 120
- Location: Houston, Texas, US
- Website: www.theatredance.uh.edu

The School of Theatre and Dance is a department within the Kathrine G. McGovern College of the Arts at the University of Houston. The School offers both Bachelor of Fine Arts and Master of Fine Arts programs, including a Bachelor of Fine Arts in acting, stage management, technical theatre, theatre education and a joint degree in both playwrighting and dramaturgy; all at the undergraduate level. Graduate programs are offered in: acting, theatre studies, theatrical design, technical direction, and theatre education. The current Director of the School of Theatre and Dance is Rob Shimko, a position he has held since 2016.

== History ==
The School of Theatre & Dance (SOTD) is the drama school of the University of Houston. SOTD produces professional plays, dance concerts, studio productions, a new play festival, and school shows through the Theatre for Young Audiences program. The school performs in the Wortham Theatre and the Quintero Theatre. The Houston Shakespeare Festival is a professional project of the school, which is produced each summer at Miller Outdoor Theatre. The UH School of Theatre & Dance offers bachelor's and master's degrees in theater and teacher certifications in dance. Its graduate program consists of arts in theatre and masters of fine arts in theatre with specializations in acting, directing and design. Faculty includes producer Stuart Ostrow, Broadway playwright Theresa Rebeck, and Tony Award nominated designer Kevin Rigdon. Among the greats who have taught at the school in previous years are Tony Award-winning playwright Mark Medoff, Lanford Wilson, Pulitzer Prize winning playwright Edward Albee, Sir Peter Hall and Jose Quintero.

== Dance program ==
The School of Theatre and Dance provides the only degree program for dance in Houston.

School of Theatre and Dance

== Facilities ==
The Cynthia Woods Mitchell Center for the Arts includes the Wortham Theatre, a 566-seat proscenium stage, and the Quintero Theatre, a 190-seat black box theatre. A $4 million renovation by Austin-based architectural firm Lake l Flato was completed in 2005. This construction project enhanced the lobby space of the existing School of Theatre and Dance, added two new rehearsal spaces, and provided a second story office suite for the Mitchell Center for the Arts.

The Lyndall Finley Wortham Theatre was built in 1977. It features a trapped floor, a counterweight fly system and ample wing space that joins a shop area large enough to accommodate several production sets. The Jose Quintero black box theatre was also built in 1977.

The School of Theatre and Dance costume shop includes a dye area, spray booth, crafts area and numerous machines. The costume shop also features an extensive collection of wardrobe stock from all time periods.

The School of Theatre and Dance scene shop includes ample space for metalworking, painting, a prop shop, and general construction.

== Partnerships ==
=== The Alley Theatre ===
The Alley Theatre and the School of Theatre and Dance established a collaboration in 2014, when it hosted the Alley staff and productions during its 2014 season. The Alley was undergoing renovations to its facilities at that time, and the School of Theatre opened its doors to the company. The collaboration gave UH Theatre graduate students the opportunity to observe Alley Theatre company members during their residency at UH, and had the ability to apply for internships.

=== Houston Shakespeare Festival ===
Each summer, the Houston Shakespeare Festival produces a season of two Shakespeare plays in repertory. Since its inception in 1975, HSF has entertained nearly a half million theatergoers with free performances in Hermann Park's Miller Outdoor Theatre. The Houston Shakespeare Festival has grown into one of the events on Houston's summer entertainment calendar.

=== The Cynthia Woods Mitchell Center for the Arts ===
Cynthia Woods Mitchell Center for the Arts at the University of Houston supports the creation and presentation of new works, sponsors visiting artist residencies, and offers courses, scholarships, lectures, and symposia, all in a creative alliance with the School of Art, Creative Writing Program, Moores School of Music, School of Theatre and Dance, and Blaffer Gallery, the Art Museum of the University of Houston.

=== Lantrip Elementary School ===
In 2011, the Lantrip Elementary School Theatre Club was established. The Club, a partnership between the School of Theatre and Dance and Houston Independent School District, brings theatre into Lantrip Elementary on a weekly basis. The school, located roughly a mile from the University of Houston campus, is an environmental science and deaf education magnet school. The program is administered, maintained, and taught by theatre education majors from the University of Houston. Students grades 1-5 are admitted to the program through an application process.

=== Big Range Dance Festival ===
Co-founded by the Head of the Dance Division, Karen Stokes, the sixth annual Big Range Dance Festival (BRDF) in summer 2008 featured new works by choreographers from Houston, Austin, California, Ohio, Pennsylvania, and North Carolina. BRDF is co-sponsored by the University of Houston's Center for Choreography.

BRDF usually takes place the first two weeks in June at Barnevelder Movement/Arts Complex.

=== Alumni ===
- Dennis Quaid, Actor (Vegas, The Right Stuff)
- Randy Quaid, Actor (The Last Detail)
- Brett Cullen, Actor (The Dark Knight Rises, Lost)
- Robert Wuhl, Actor/Comedian/Screenwriter (Arliss)
- Jim Parsons, Actor (The Big Bang Theory)
- Sally Mayes, actress
- Brent Spiner, Actor (Star Trek: The Next Generation)
- Loretta Devine, Actress (Grey's Anatomy)
- Cindy Pickett, Actress (Ferris Bueller's Day Off)
- Trey Wilson, Actor (Raising Arizona, Bull Durham)
- Guru Singh, Actor (Outsourced)
- Tommy Tune, Actor/Director/Choreographer (The Best Little Whorehouse in Texas
- Bill Hicks, comedian
- Chris Patton, Voice Actor (Dragon Ball Z)
- Larry Hovis, Actor (Hogan's Heroes)
- Derek Cecil, Actor (Recount, Men in Black II)
- JT Buck, Playwright/Composer (The Gospel According to Tammy Faye)
- Peter Breck, Actor (Maverick, The Big Valley)
- Larry Blyden, Actor (Flower Drum Song, A Funny Thing Happened on the Way to the Forum)
- Greg Baldwin, Voice Actor (SpongeBob SquarePants)

=== Faculty ===
- Jose Quintero (former
- Sir Peter Hall (former)
- Edward Albee (former)
- Mark Medoff (former)
- Kevin Rigdon
- Stuart Ostrow
- Lanford Wilson (former)
- Ntozake Shange (former)
