= Glass Mountain (magazine) =

University of Houston literary magazine

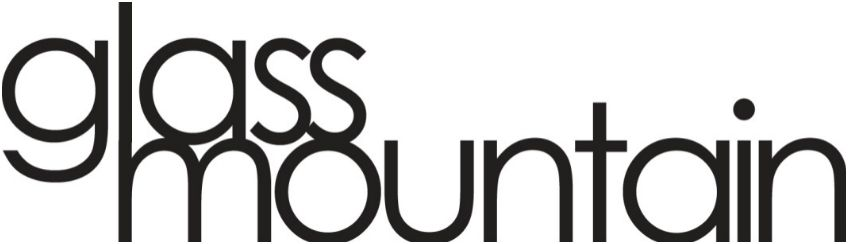
- Editor: Natalie Dean
- Categories: Literary magazine
- Frequency: Biannual
- Circulation: 2,500
- First issue: 2006
- Country: United States
- Based in: Houston, Texas
- Language: English
- Website: https://www.glassmountainmag.com/

Glass Mountain is an undergraduate literary magazine at the University of Houston that was established in 2006. The title is an allusion to a short story with the same title by Donald Barthelme. The magazine publishes poetry, fiction, non-fiction, reviews, literary essays, and art written by undergraduates. Each issue also includes interviews with notable literary figures, including Mat Johnson, Mark Doty, Nick Flynn, Tony Hoagland, and others. The publication is listed in the Council of Literary Magazines and Presses and launched its first national issue in 2011. In 2013, the journal was awarded the Director's Prize for content by the Association of Writers & Writing Programs.

== Glass Mountain community ==
Glass Mountain is associated with the Creative Writing Program of the University of Houston College of Liberal Arts and Social Sciences and the literary magazine Gulf Coast. It has also partnered with the School of Art, the School of Theatre and Dance, the Blaffer Gallery, the Wortham Theater Center and the Moores School of Music. The magazine has been involved with a number of local and national community organizations, including the Association of Writers & Writing Programs, Poison Girl Reading Series, the Houston chapter of Writers in the Schools, Brazos Bookstore, Bohemeo's, the Menil Collection, the Society for the Performing Arts Prelude Series, and the Cynthia Woods Mitchell Center for the Arts.

The magazine is involved in Houston area cultural events as well, including the East End Cultural Arts Festival and it has collaborated with Houston Public Radio, NANO Fiction, the Council of Literary Magazines and Presses, the Houston Arts Alliance, the Houston Endowment Inc., the Texas Commission on the Arts, Poets & Writers, the National Endowment for the Arts, Gulf Coast, an annual Write-a-Thon, and the Menil Collection to present the Houston Indie Book Festival at Menil Park.

== Boldface Writing Conference ==
The annual Boldface Writing Conference was founded in 2009 by the editors of Glass Mountain as a conference devoted exclusively to developing writers. The conference is held at the M. D. Anderson Library at the University of Houston and hosts craft talks, readings and workshops in poetry, fiction and creative non-fiction. Each year, the conference selects winners for the Robertson Prize in poetry and fiction. Guest speakers to the event have included Ange Mlinko, Kevin Prufer, Jericho Brown, and Alexander Parsons among others.
