= Community Artists' Collective =

Non-profit exhibition space in Texas, USA

Coordinates: 29.7347°N 95.3797°W

- Established: 1987
- Founders: Michelle Barnes; Sarah Trotty
- Type: Nonprofit
- Tax ID no.: 76-0236596
- Purpose: Arts education and entrepreneurship for African Americans
- Location: 4111 Fannin St Suite #100A, Houston, TX 77004
- Website: thecollective.org

The Community Artists' Collective is a non-profit exhibition space based in Houston, Texas, USA, focused on exhibiting work by African American artists and creating more opportunities for children and adults to explore the arts.

== History ==
The Collective was founded in 1987 by artist Michelle Barnes and Texas Southern University professor Dr. Sarah Trotty as an exhibition space for professional African American artists in Houston, especially African American women artists. It has become a platform for emerging artists that also provides educational workshops for children and adults in collaboration with organizations such as Project Row Houses and SHAPE Community Center.

Prior to founding the Collective, Barnes in 1983 founded the Barnes-Blackman Gallery in partnership with The Ensemble Theatre with art shown part-time in the theater's lobby prior to each performance. Its purpose was to bring "the African-American community into the arts at every level, from making art to administering programs."

Barnes and Trotty were also founding board members of the African American Heritage Museum led by Dr. Robert Galloway that began in February 1988 and opened later that year. Located in a small space of approximately 800 square feet at 2101 Crawford Street in downtown Houston, the museum's first exhibition featured work by Texas Southern University students curated by former professor and sculptor Carroll Simms.

The Barnes-Blackman Gallery moved to the Collective's first location at 1501 Elgin near La Branch in November 1989, with the first show taking place on February 11, 1990, in conjunction with Houston Fotofest. There was no heat and no working toilets in the building that had been vacant for years before being leased by Barnes, so she was able to negotiate a lower rent in exchange for renovating the building. By 1995, the Collective included various facilities in addition to its exhibition space such as a library, classroom space, photography darkroom, and a frame shop. In 2005 the organization held a "Fun Razing" benefit party to celebrate the demolition of the old building with plans to replace it with a $22 million, 100,000 square foot building with 8,500 square feet for the Collective.

The Collective is a founding member of the Third Ward Community Cloth Cooperative, which was established in 1992.

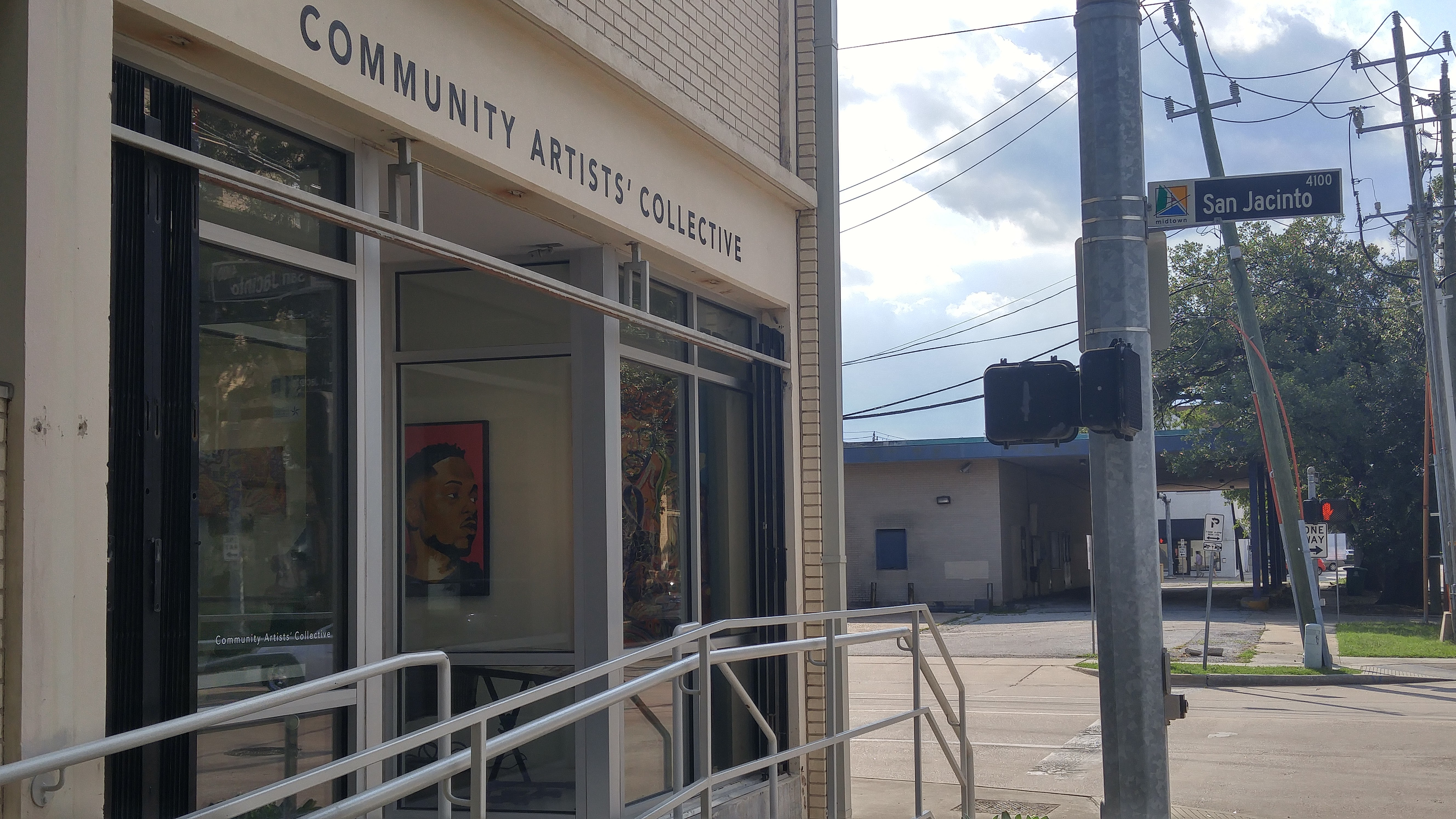
The former site of the Community Artists' Collective from 2015 to 2024

It relocated to the Midtown Art Center Tea Room at 1413 Holman at La Branch for a period of time from around 2008 until 2014. The Collective was located at 4101 San Jacinto from 2015 to 2024. It is currently located at 4111 Fannin Street.

== Programs ==
The Collective has provided youth programming such as an eight-week summer program which allowed students to show and sell their artwork. It has worked with various community organizations and the City of Houston to help youth use art to develop career goals. Through after school and summer programs, Saturday classes, and workshops in art forms such as videography, ceramics, dance, literature, painting, and photography. These sessions are led by TSU art students, artists-in-residence, professional artists, and Barnes herself.

=== Jubilee Quilt Circle ===
Weekly on Thursdays and Fridays, the Collective hosts the Jubilee Quilt Circle where participants can learn and practice skills related to quilting and crochet. The Collective held its first Quilt Raffle in 1991 to benefit its youth programming, raffling off a quilt created by Blackshear Elementary and Ryan Middle School students in the after school program.

== Artists ==
- Ann Johnson
- Gail P. Mallory
- Lee Carrier
- Shani Crowe
- Earlie Hudnall, Jr.
- Annette Lawrence
- Robert Hodge
- Tierney Malone
- David McGee
- Ricardo Osmondo Francis
- Jean Lacey
- Michael Ray Charles
