= Number 139 =

Sculpture by Leonardo Drew

Number 139 is a large sculpture created in 2010 by African American contemporary artist Leonardo Drew.

== Description ==
Number 139 is constructed of hundreds of wooden slabs, chunks, wedges, blocks and twigs. Some of the wooden elements, if not all, are attached to one another with screws. The chunks and twigs are most evident at the top and sides of the structure. The majority of stacked slabs sit at eye level and downward, implying an impending collapse of the foundation. The natural surface of the wooden pieces and screws have been altered with black paint. Upon closer look, some of the wooden elements reveal their original caramel-toned pigment. The placement of each component is very deliberate. The composition of the work reads balanced and harmonious than that of natural destruction. Deep inside of the work, surprising elements appear such as toothy slabs. These thin pieces have split in some sort of methodical yet haphazard manner, revealing potential visual representations of teeth, piano keys, or city skylines.

Repetition is routinely employed in the placement of materials except for two notable instances. Close to the bottom left of the artwork there is a misshapen slab with a nearly perfect circle-shaped cutaway. Upon close investigation, this negative circle space appears imperfect, implying possible organic origins. The circle detail is unique to the piece. The other notable eccentricity is a long stick at the top right portion of the work. It protrudes far more than any other element, almost disquietingly so in its exaggerated gesture. Many juxtapositions exist within this form, perhaps most prominently the twigs and stumps placed methodically against stacked machine-cut wooden slabs.
