= Houston Shakespeare Festival =

Coordinates: 29.725156°N 95.344017°W

- Genre: Repertory theatre
- Begins: April
- Ends: August
- Frequency: Annual
- Locations: Houston, Texas, USA
- Years active: 51
- Inaugurated: 1975
- Attendance: over 1 million
- Website: www.uh.edu/shakespeare

The Houston Shakespeare Festival (HSF) is a regional repertory theatre in Houston, Texas, United States. Each summer, the Houston Shakespeare Festival produces a season of two Shakespeare plays in repertory. Since its inception in 1975, HSF has entertained over a million theatergoers with free performances in Hermann Park's Miller Outdoor Theatre. The Houston Shakespeare Festival has since become one of the major events on Houston's summer entertainment calendar. HSF is a recognized Actors' Equity Association theatre.

== History ==
In the summer of 1975, Dr. Sidney Berger, the then Director of the University of Houston's School of Theatre and Dance, met with the college's administrators and the Miller Outdoor Theatre Advisory Council to enlist support for a two-production season of Shakespeare's works to be played in repertory on Miller Theatre's bill.

The first year was met with acclaim, with audience size exceeding projections and local citizens writing letter of support to the University of Houston. As years have passed, HSF's budget has increased. The University of Houston provides access to its scenery workshops, office rooms, a rehearsal area and more. In 1989, The Cullen Trust for the Performing Arts gifted an endowment for HSF to enter a seasonal agreement with Actors' Equity Association.

Berger, who had started work in Houston in 1969, retired in 2007. The last play he directed at the Festival was Much Ado About Nothing, in 2010.

== Leadership ==
Dr. Sidney Berger (1975-2006)
Founding Artistic Director

Steven W. Wallace (2007-2013)
Executive Director

Jim Johnson (2014–2016, 2023)
Executive Director

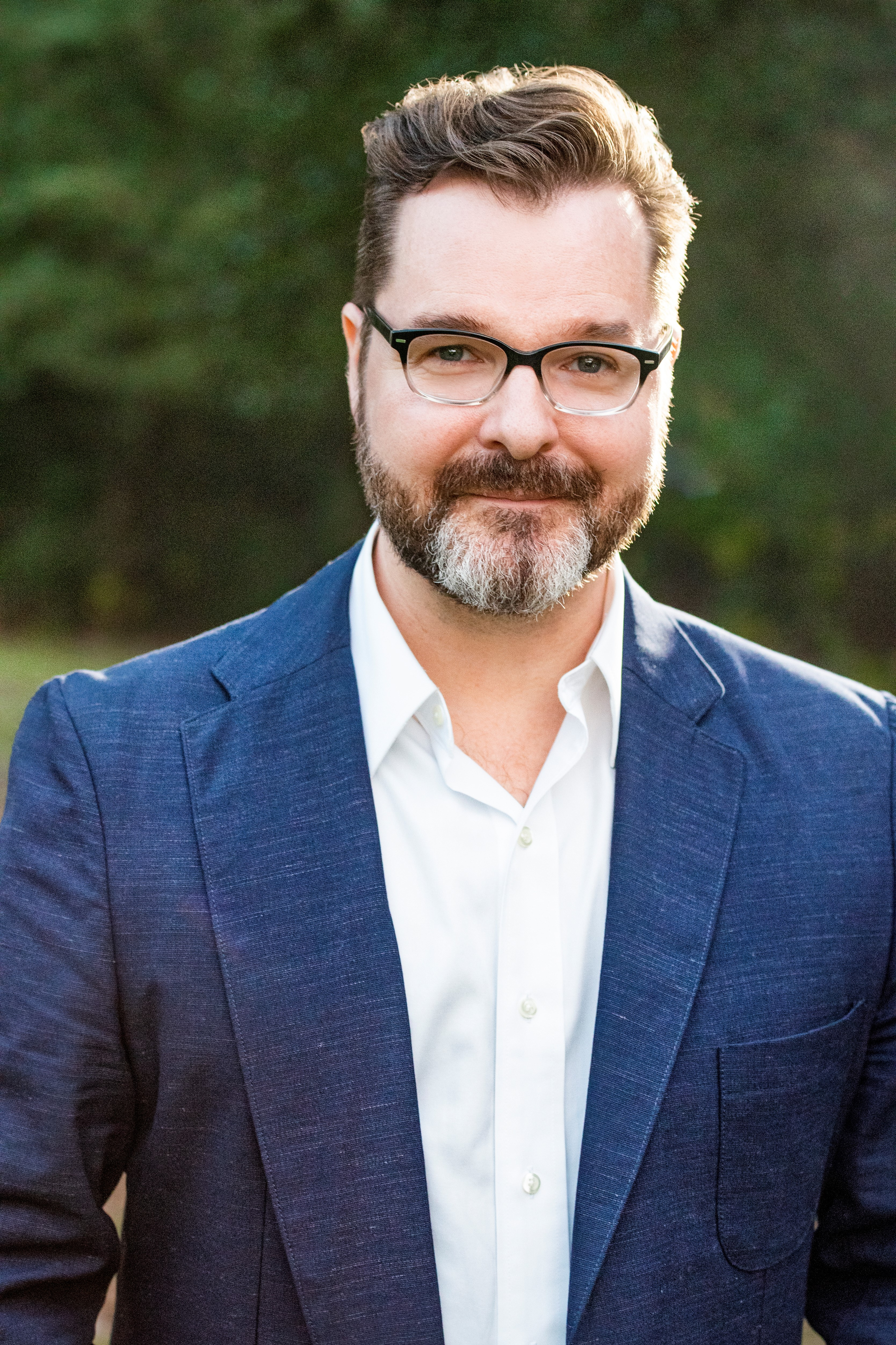
Dr. Robert Shimko (2016-2023)
Executive Director & Literary Manager

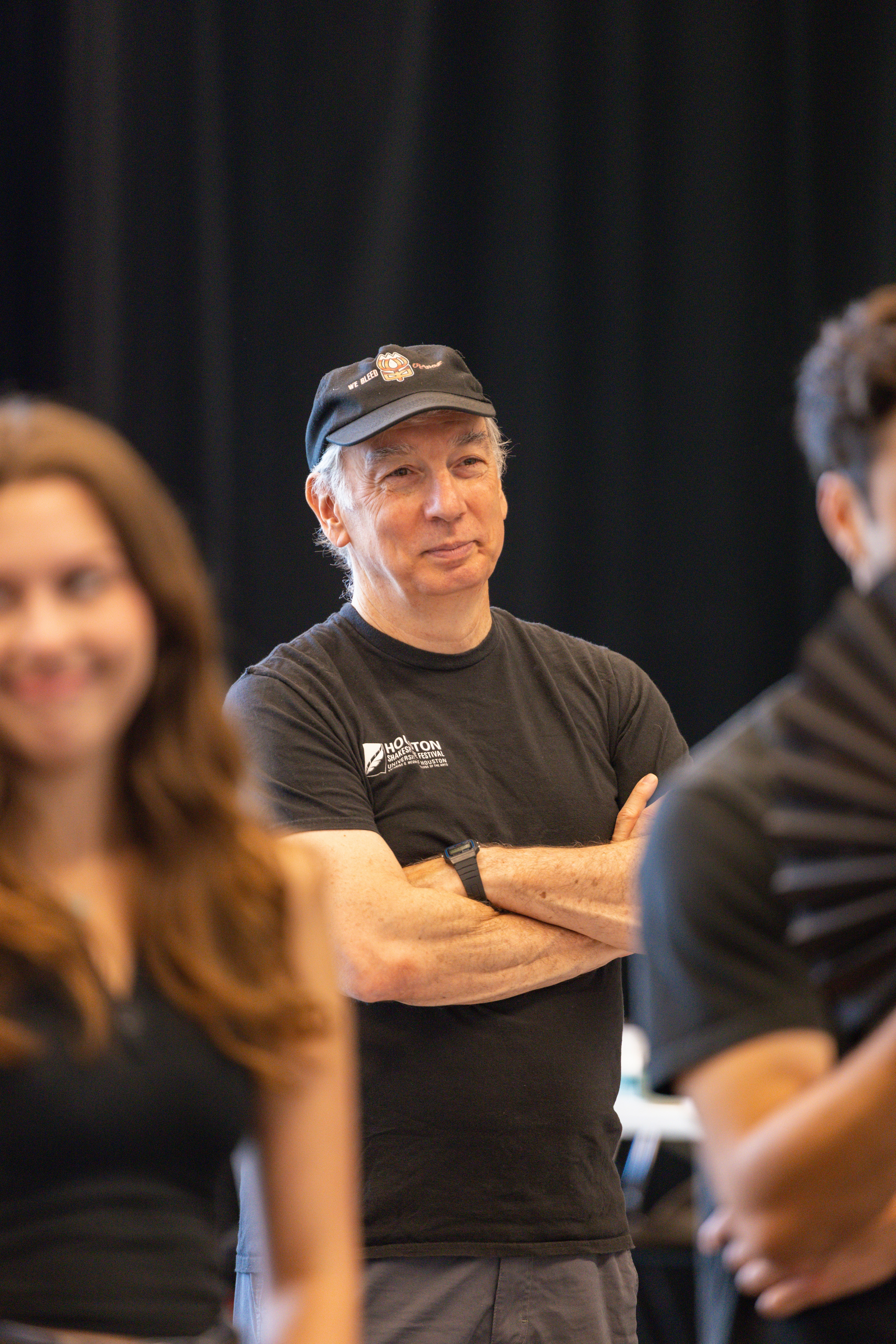
Jack Young (2014-current)
Artistic Director

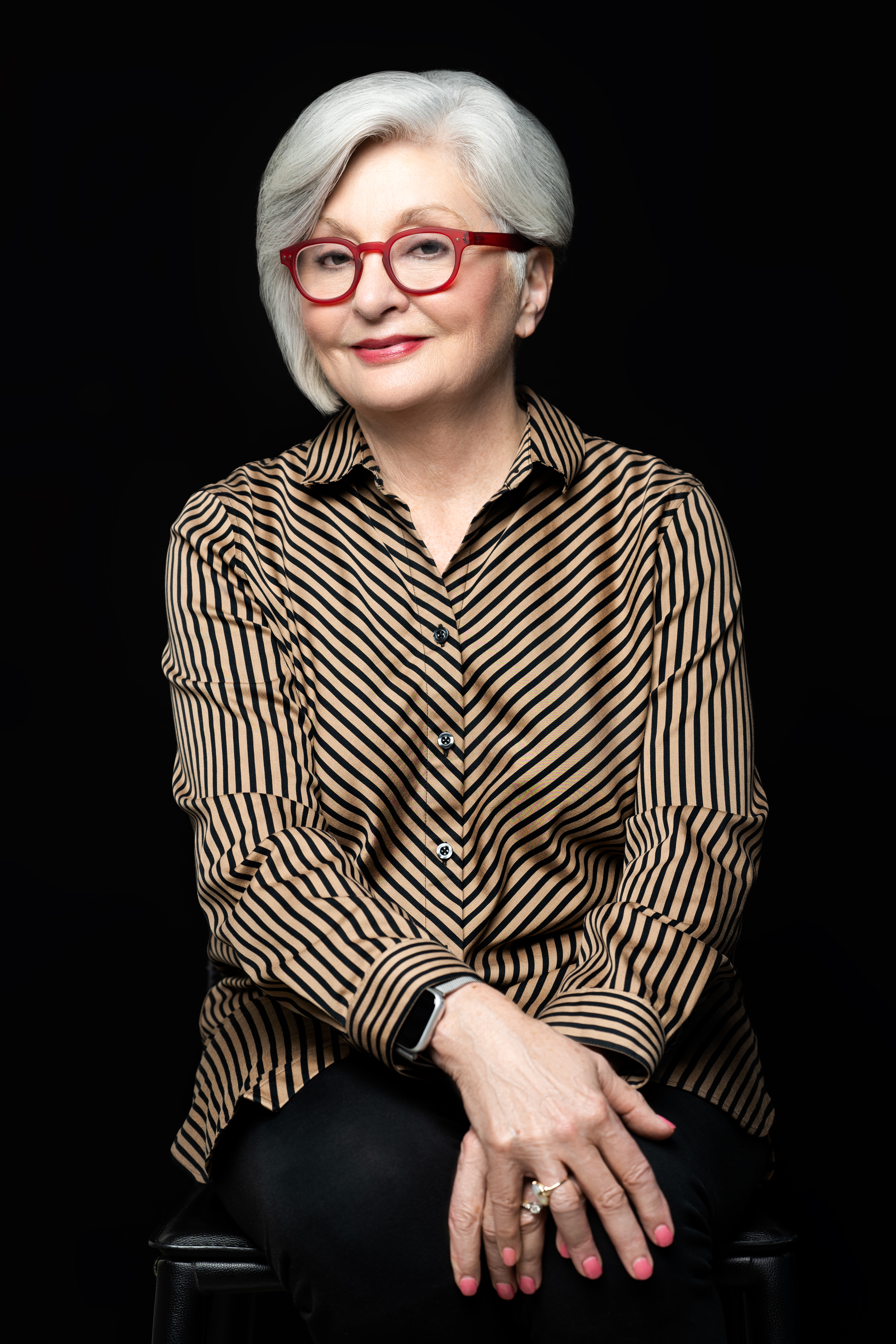
Sharon Ott (2024-current)
Executive Director

== Production history ==
Year	Show	Director	Notable Actors
1975	The Taming of the Shrew	Sidney Berger	Richard McWilliams
1975	A Midsummer Night's Dream	Cecil Pickett	Richard McWilliams, Cindy Pickett
1976	The Tempest	Cecil Pickett	Brett Cullen, Christopher Rich
1976	Romeo and Juliet	Sidney Berger	Brett Cullen
1977	The Comedy of Errors	Cecil Pickett	Brett Cullen
1977	Hamlet	Sidney Berger	Brett Cullen
1978	The Merry Wives of Windsor	Cecil Pickett	James Harper, Brett Cullen
1978	Macbeth	Sidney Berger	James Harper, Brett Cullen
1979	Much Ado About Nothing	Sidney Berger	Brett Cullen
1979	Twelfth Night	Cecil Pickett	Brett Cullen
1980	King Lear	Sidney Berger	Dan O'Herlihy, Blue Deckert
1980	As You Like It	Cecil Pickett	Blue Deckert
1981	A Midsummer Night's Dream	Sidney Berger	Mark Voland, Jeff Bennett
1981	The Merchant of Venice	Cecil Pickett	Mark Voland
1982	The Tempest	Cecil Pickett	James Robert Daniels
1982	Love's Labor's Lost	Sidney Berger	James Robert Daniels
1983	The Winter's Tale	Charles Krohn	Jeff Bennett
1983	The Comedy of Errors	Sydney Berger	Jeff Bennett
1984	Hamlet	Sidney Berger	Kenneth Marshall, Dante Di Loreto, Jeff Bennett
1984	The Two Gentlemen of Verona	Charles Krohn	Dante Di Loreto, Jeff Bennett
1985	Richard III	Sidney Berger	Frank Barrie, Rutherford Cravens
1985	Measure For Measure	Charles Krohn	Rutherford Cravens
1986	Othello	Sidney Berger	Richard Lawson, Rutherford Cravens, Jeff Bennett
1986	All's Well That Ends Well	Charles Krohn	Jeff Bennett
1987	Julius Caesar	Kate Pogue	Rutherford Cravens
1987	The Taming of the Shrew	Sidney Berger	Rutherford Cravens
1988	Richard II	Kate Pogue	Rutherford Cravens, James Gale
1988	Twelfth Night	Sidney Berger	Rutherford Cravens, James Gale, Suzanne Savoy
1989	Coriolanus	Sidney Berger	Rutherford Cravens
1989	As You Like It	Greg Leaming	Rutherford Cravens
1990	Troilus and Cressida	Rutherford Cravens	Rutherford Cravens
1990	The Tempest	Sidney Berger	Rutherford Cravens
1991	The Merchant of Venice	Sidney Berger	Tom Klunis, Rutherford Cravens
1991	The Merry Wives of Windsor	Rutherford Cravens	Rutherford Cravens
1992	Romeo and Juliet	Carolyn Houston Boone	Rutherford Cravens
1992	Much Ado About Nothing	Sidney Berger	Rutherford Cravens
1993	Henry V	Sidney Berger	Rutherford Cravens
1993	A Midsummer Night's Dream	Carolyn Houston Boone	Rutherford Cravens
1994	Hamlet	Sidney Berger	Rutherford Cravens
1994	Love's Labor Lost	Carolyn Houston Boone	Rutherford Cravens
1995	Pericles	Carolyn Houston Boone	Rutherford Cravens
1995	As You Like It	Sidney Berger	Rutherford Cravens
1996	The Winter's Tale	Beth Sandford	Rutherford Cravens
1996	Macbeth	Sidney Berger	Rutherford Cravens
1997	The Tempest	Carolyn Houston Boone	Jim Parsons, William Hardy, Howard French, Rutherford Cravens
1997	The Comedy of Errors	Sidney Berger	William Hardy, Rutherford Cravens, James Belcher
1998	The Two Gentlemen of Verona	Rutherford Cravens	Rutherford Cravens
1998	King Lear	Sidney Berger	Rutherford Cravens
1999	Twelfth Night	Sidney Berger	Rutherford Cravens
1999	The Taming of the Shrew	Beth Sandford	Rutherford Cravens
2000	The Merry Wives of Windsor	Rutherford Cravens	Rutherford Cravens
2000	Othello	Sidney Berger	Rutherford Cravens
2001	Romeo and Juliet	Sidney Berger	Rutherford Cravens
2001	King John	Rutherford Cravens	Rutherford Cravens
2002	A Midsummer Night's Dream	Sidney Berger	Rutherford Cravens
2002	Measure For Measure	Rutherford Cravens	Rutherford Cravens
2003	The Winter's Tale	Sidney Berger	Rutherford Cravens
2003	Much Ado About Nothing	Rod Bundy	Rutherford Cravens, Jason Douglas
2004	Macbeth	Rob Bundy	Rutherford Cravens, Jason Douglas
2004	The Taming of the Shrew	Sidney Berger	Rutherford Cravens
2005	Hamlet	Carolyn Houston Boone	Rutherford Cravens
2005	As You Like It	Sidney Berger	Rutherford Cravens
2006	Titus Andronicus	Carolyn Houston Boone	Rutherford Cravens
2006	The Tempest	Sidney Berger	Rutherford Cravens
2007	Romeo and Juliet	Carolyn Houston Boone	Jessica Boone, Rutherford Cravens
2007	Love's Labor's Lost	Sidney Berger	Rutherford Cravens
2008	Julius Caesar	Sidney Berger	Rutherford Cravens
2008	Cymbeline	Carolyn Houston Boone	Jessica Boone, Rutherford Cravens
2009	Twelfth Night	Sidney Berger	Rutherford Cravens
2009	Pericles	Carolyn Houston Boone	Rutherford Cravens
2010	Much Ado About Nothing	Sidney Berger	Rutherford Cravens, Bob Boudreaux
2010	A Midsummer Night's Dream	Carolyn Houston Boone	Rutherford Cravens
2011	Othello	Leah C. Gardiner	Seth Gilliam, Rutherford Cravens
2011	The Taming of the Shrew	Jack Young	Seth Gilliam, Rutherford Cravens
2012	Hamlet	Steve Pickering	Cindy Pickett, Mark Metcalf, Rutherford Cravens
2012	The Comedy of Errors	Paul Steger	Cindy Pickett, Mark Metcalf, Rutherford Cravens
2013	Antony and Cleopatra	Leah C. Gardiner	Seth Gilliam, Rutherford Cravens
2013	As You Like It	Marc Masterson	Seth Gilliam, Rutherford Cravens
2014	Henry IV, Part I	Jack Young	David Rainey, David Huynh
2014	Two Gentlemen of Verona	Brendon Fox	Kiara Feliciano, Amelia Fischer
2015	Merchant of Venice	Tiger Reel	Jack Young, Mirron Willis
2015	Macbeth	Jack Young	Adam Noble, Tracie Thomason
2016	Henry V	Lenny Banovez	Brendon Marshall-Rashid, Susie Parr
2016	Much Ado About Nothing	Jack Young	Demetria Thomas, Patrick Poole
2017	Twelfth Night	Jack Young	Dylan Paul, Tracie Thomason, Meg Rodgers, Mike Lee, Patrick Poole
2017	Richard III	Lenny Banovez	Jack Young, Madison Hart, Patrick Poole, Carlton Warnberg, Dylan Paul
2018	Hamlet	Jack Young	Shannon Hill, Demetria Thomas, Crash Buist, Shannon Uphold
2018	Comedy of Errors	Jack Young	Andrew Garrett, Crash Buist
2019	Julius Caesar	Jack Young	Dean Coutris, Crash Buist, Andrew Garret, David Huynh
2019	As You Like It	Stephanie Shine	Laura Frye Banovez, David Huynh
2020	Canceled		
2020	Canceled		
2021	Canceled		
2021	Canceled		
2022	Cymbeline	Jack Young	
2022	King Lear	Stephanie Shine	Jack Young
2023	Much Ado About Nothing	Amelia Fischer	Allison Pistorius,
2023	Macbeth	Demetria Thomas	Alan Brincks, Laura Frye
2024	A Midsummer Night's Dream	Amelia Fischer	Alan Brincks, Laura Frye, Michael Sifuentes, Wesley Whitson
2024	Romeo & Juliet	Jack Young	Sophia Marcelle, Kyle Clark
2025	Henry V	Jack Young	Michael Thatcher, Brandon Carter
2025	As You Like It	Sophia Watt	Michael Thatcher, Brandon Carter
