= Sarah Campbell Blaffer =

American philanthropist (1885–1975)

- Born: Sarah Campbell; August 27, 1885; Waxahachie, Texas, U.S.
- Died: May 13, 1975 (aged 89); Houston, Texas, U.S.
- Education: Boston Conservatory
- Organization: Sarah Campbell Blaffer Foundation
- Known for: Philanthropy
- Spouse: Robert Lee Blaffer
- Children: 4, including Jane Blaffer Owen
- Relatives: Sarah Blaffer Hrdy (granddaughter)

Sarah Campbell Blaffer (née Campbell; August 27, 1885 – May 13, 1975) was an American philanthropist and contributor to the art collection of the Museum of Fine Arts, Houston. She inherited two fortunes based on oil money – one from her father's investments in Texaco, and the other from her husband's investments in Humble Oil.

== Early life ==
She was born on August 27, 1885, to William Thomas Campbell and his wife Sarah Turnbull in Waxahachie, Texas. William Thomas Campbell co-founded the Texas Company. She attended school at a convent in Lampasas, Texas, before matriculating at the Boston Conservatory.

== Philanthropy ==
In 1964, Blaffer created the Sarah Campbell Blaffer Foundation. Its mission of sending works of art on tour to make them more accessible to people who live in smaller communities. The foundation assembled collections of Francisco de Goya etchings and William Hogarth engravings, and also amassed a collection of Italian Renaissance paintings and a collection of early modern paintings from the Netherlands. Notably, Blaffer also owned Mark Rothko's abstract No. 7 (1951).

Blaffer is the namesake of the Blaffer Art Museum at the University of Houston. The non-collecting contemporary art museum was founded in 1973 and is housed within the Kathrine G. McGovern College of the Arts at the university. Some of its early activities consisted of loaning works of arts for travelling expositions within Texas. In 2000, the Museum of Fine Arts, Houston (MFAH) established permanent display space for part of the Blaffer Foundation Collection. These are housed in five different galleries of MFAH’s Beck Building.

== Personal life ==
In 1909, she married Robert Lee Blaffer, one of the co-founders of Humble Oil. The couple had four children, including arts patron Jane Blaffer Owen and philanthropist Cecil Amelia Blaffer who married German aristocrat Prince Tassilo zu Fürstenberg (ex-husband of Clara Agnelli, father of Ira von Fürstenberg and father-in-law of Diane von Fürstenberg).

== Death ==
Blaffer died in Houston on May 13, 1975.
