= Carla Sharp =

American clinical psychologist

- Born: 1971 (age 54–55); South Africa

Academic background
- Education: BA, Psychology and Philosophy, 1992, BEd., Psychology, 1996, MA, Clinical Psychology, 1996, Stellenbosch University; PhD, Developmental Psychopathology, 2000, University of Cambridge
- Thesis: Biased minds: theory of mind in emotional behaviour disorders of middle childhood. (2000)

Carla Sharp (born 1971) is an American clinical psychologist. She is a professor in the Clinical Psychology Doctoral Program and Associate Dean for Faculty and Research at the University of Houston, where she is also Director of the Adolescent Diagnosis Assessment Prevention and Treatment Center and the Developmental Psychopathology Lab.

== Early life and education ==
Sharp was born in 1971. She completed her Bachelor of Arts, Bachelor of Education, and Master of Arts degrees at Stellenbosch University before enrolling at the University of Cambridge for her PhD.

== Career ==
Following her PhD and post-doctoral fellowship at the University of Cambridge, Sharp joined the faculty at Baylor College of Medicine in 2004. She remained at the institution until 2009 when she joined the faculty at the University of Houston (UH). Upon joining the Department of Clinical Psychology, Sharp received a National Alliance for Research on Schizophrenia and Depression Young Investigator Award to "establish a reward-related behavioral and neurobiological endophenotype for Major Depressive Disorder in children or adolescents and clarify the etiological status of altered reward processing in the development of Major Depressive Disorder." Sharp then conducted a two-year research project on 111 adolescent inpatients between the ages of 12 and 17 in order to provide empirical evidence to support the relationship between borderline personality disorder traits and "hypermentalizing" in adolescents. In order to assess the social cognition process with children, Sharp's research team used Movie for the Assessment of Cognition, self-report measures of emotion regulation, and psychopathology. As a result of her academic research, Sharp received the University of Houston College of Liberal Arts and Social Sciences 2013 Excellence in Research and Scholarship Award.

In 2014, Sharp returned to her native South Africa to develop a reliable and valid diagnostic tool to identify and help children with emotional behavior issues. She also received UH's Early Faculty Award for Mentoring Undergraduate Research. In 2016, Sharp was appointed the director of the newly established University of Houston Adolescent Diagnosis Assessment Prevention Treatment (ADAPT) Center. The purpose of the center was to provide low-cost services such as extensive evaluation, individual therapy, or group therapy to families of adolescents. While serving in this role, she was the recipient of the Mid-Career Award from the North American Society for the Study of Personality Disorders and the Award for Achievement in the Field of Severe Personality Disorders from the Personality Disorders Institute and Borderline Personality Disorder Resource Center.

During the COVID-19 pandemic, Sharp's ADAPT Center provided free mental health care to Texas food and beverage workers as well as their families. She also continued to conduct research on personality and behavioral disorders. In 2021, Sharp's research team published the first study to show that adolescent borderline pathology followed a similar downward course as adults after discharge from inpatient treatment. She also conducted qualitative interviews to conclude that adolescents from racial and ethnic minority groups with elevated levels of mental health problems before the pandemic had significantly better health during the pandemic due to the increased time spent with families.
