= Michelle Barnes =

American artist, educator and arts administrator

Michelle A. Barnes
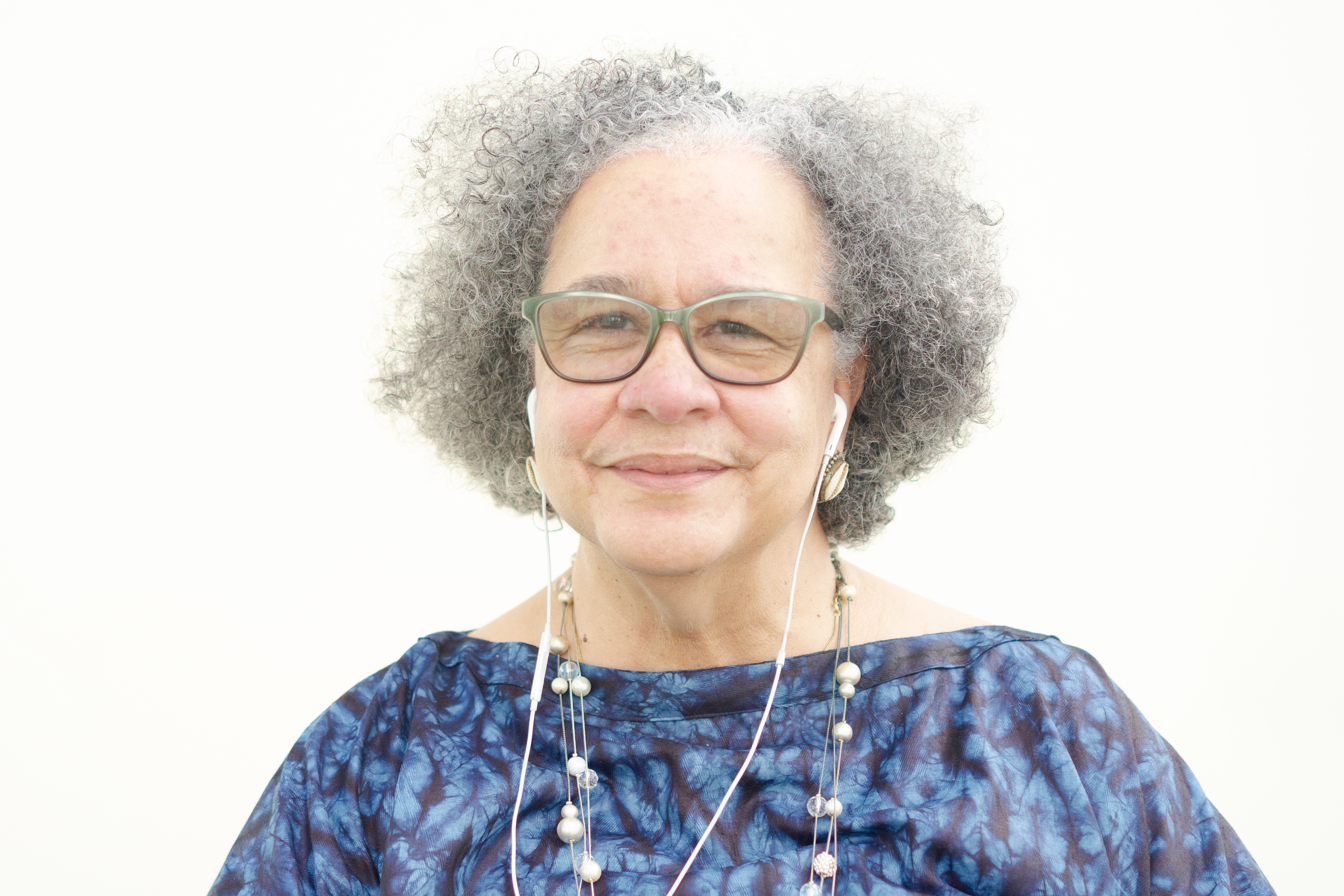
- Born: 1948 (age 77–78); Austin, Texas
- Education: University of Houston
- Known for: Community Artists' Collective

Michelle Barnes (born 1948) is an American artist, educator, and arts administrator based in Houston. She works with sculptural materials including fibers and papier-mâché, and is the co-founder and executive director of the Community Artists’ Collective.

== Early life ==
Michelle Anita Swain was born in Austin in 1948 to August and Anita Swain; her family moved to Houston's Third Ward neighborhood in 1951 or 1952 when she was four or five after her father finished his graduate degree in social work. Her mother taught home economics and was a member of Delta Sigma Theta. Barnes was the first grandchild on both sides of the family. The family attended the Wesley Chapel AME.

She grew up in a creative family. At an early age, her father taught her mosaics and furniture building and her mother taught her to sew. By 13, she had won awards for sewing.

She attended Edward L. Blackshear and Lucian L. Lockhart elementary schools and Miller junior high school (now the Young Women's College Preparatory Academy). She graduated in 1966 from Jack Yates High School, where she participated in fashion shows and learned dressmaking. She started at the University of Houston in 1966, took her first traditional art classes there, and graduated in 1970. She became friends with Lynn Eusan while they were both students at Houston.

== Career ==
Barnes first worked at Sharpstown High School in the Houston Independent School District, then at The Kinkaid School for eight years starting in 1981. For 30 years, she taught art at SHAPE Community Center as a volunteer. While teaching, Barnes worked at DuBose gallery from 1977 to 1981. Working in collaboration with Alvia Wardlaw, she was the program coordinator for the Scholastic Knowledge for Youth (SKY) program in 1994 where middle school students learned film-making and interviewed local artists.

She founded the Barnes-Blackman Gallery in 1983 in collaboration with The Ensemble Theatre. This initiative showed art on a part-time basis in the theater's lobby, with Barnes installing each exhibit prior to that evening’s play and removing them shortly after the performance. In 1988, Barnes became a founding board member of the African American Heritage Museum. The small museum, which opened later that year, was located in downtown Houston at 2101 Crawford Street.

Barnes was also the assistant director of the University of Houston-Clear Lake Art Gallery in 1989. She was the coordinator of the Minority Internship Program for college students launched at the Museum of Fine Arts, Houston in the summer of 1990.

In 1985, Barnes joined with her college schoolmate and fellow artist Sarah Trotty to create the Community Artists’ Collective to provide exhibition space for emerging African American artists, and African American women artists in particular. The organization also offers programming to introduce children and adults to various forms of art such as pottery, painting, quilting, and photography.

She found the first location for the Collective in 1989 at the intersection of La Branch and Elgin streets in Houston. With no toilets and no heat, the building had long been vacant which allowed her to negotiate a lower rent. She worked with her husband to renovate the space, and the Collective held its inaugural exhibition in 1990 in this space as a part of Houston Fotofest. The exhibition featuring photos by a South African magazine with the opening coinciding with Nelson Mandela's release from prison.

== Awards ==
In 1992, Barnes was honored by the High School for the Performing and Visual Arts at its annual Musicfest gala for her contributions in visual arts. She was honored for her professional achievements as a YWCA Woman of the Year in 1993. In 2009, she was honored at The State of Art by African Americans by the South Texas Cluster of The Links and the Museum of Fine Arts, Houston African American Art Advisory Association.

== Personal life ==
Barnes married while still in college before her fiance enlisted in the military in 1968 and was deployed in the Vietnam War. The couple had a child together and divorced. She later married attorney Barry Barnes and had two additional children.

== Further research ==
- Barnes, Michelle; Enriquez, Sandra; Rodriguez, Samantha (17 June 2016). "Oral History Interview with Michelle Barnes, June 17, 2016". Portal to Texas History. – alternative link to interview at TCU Library
- "Michelle Barnes interview - University of Houston Libraries Audio/Video Repository". University of Houston. 11 October 1985.
