= Dante Di Loreto =

American film and television producer

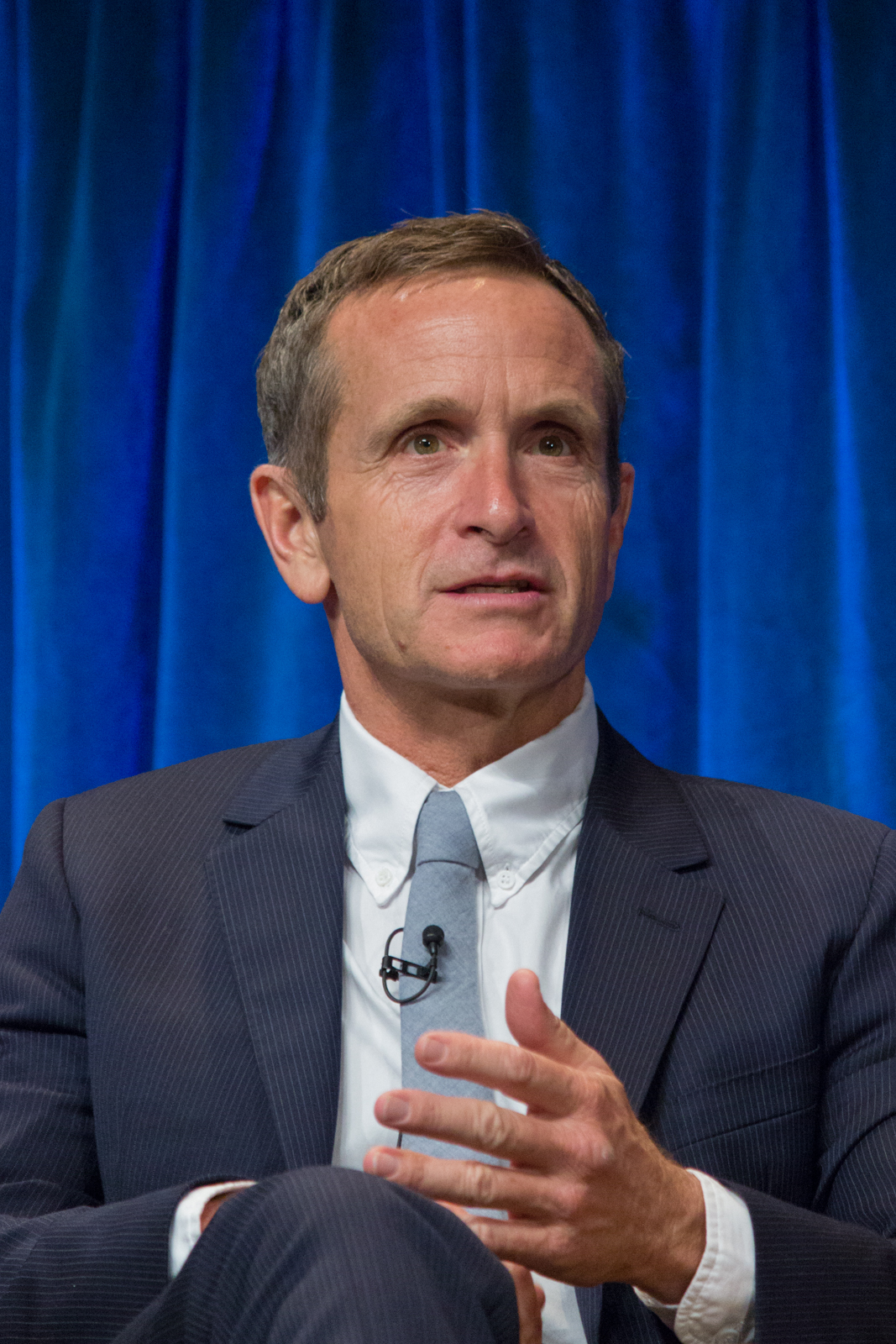
- Di Loreto at PaleyFest 2013 for American Horror Story: Asylum
- Born: May 1958 (age 68)
- Education: University of California, Santa Barbara (1984); AFI Conservatory (M.F.A. 1991)
- Occupations: Film and television producer
- Board member of: Direct Relief; Center Theatre Group
- Children: 2
- Awards: Daytime Emmy Award (2002); Primetime Emmy Award (2010, 2014)

Dante Di Loreto (born May 1958) is an American film and television producer most notable for executive producing Glee and American Horror Story. He is a two-time Primetime Emmy Award winner and for his work on Temple Grandin and The Normal Heart. He has also won a Daytime Emmy Award for his work on My Louisiana Sky. DiLoreto was the President of Ryan Murphy Television; and the President of Television at Chernin Entertainment. and now he's the president of US Scripted Entertainment for Fremantle.

== Early life and education ==
Di Loreto was raised in Santa Barbara, California. He attended the University of California, Santa Barbara as an undergraduate in the '70s. While a student, Di Loreto served as the internal vice president for the Associated Students of the University of California, Santa Barbara. He graduated from UCSB in 1984.

Di Loreto also holds an M.F.A. from the AFI Conservatory obtained in 1991.

== Career ==
=== Start in acting ===
Di Loreto began his career as a stage actor in the early 1980's, appearing regionally in theaters including the Alley Theatre, Houston Shakespeare Festival, and Shakespeare Santa Cruz.

He attempted to break into Hollywood in the mid-80s. His roles include appearing in an episode of L.A. Law in 1989 and an episode of Cheers in 1991 (Season 9, "Carla Loves Clavin"). He moved to production in the early '90s.

=== Move to production ===
Di Loreto supervised film development and US theatrical operations for Bill Kenwright Ltd., the largest production company in the United Kingdom. Di Loreto later produced several shows for cable and broadcast television as well as a selection of films. His production credits include Pretty/Handsome, My Louisiana Sky, Temple Grandin and Die, Mommie, Die!, which was awarded the Sundance Film Festival’s Special Jury Prize.

=== Partnership with Ryan Murphy ===
Di Loreto joined up with Ryan Murphy on several different projects, most notably Glee and American Horror Story. Additionally, he's worked on The New Normal and The Glee Project. He was the President of Ryan Murphy Television. Di Loreto made his directorial debut with the season six episode "Transitioning".

== Personal life ==
Di Loreto serves as a board member for Direct Relief and Center Theatre Group.

He currently resides in Los Angeles, California, and has twin sons.

== Awards and honors ==
- Primetime Emmy Award for Outstanding Television Movie for Temple Grandin (2010)
- Primetime Emmy Award for Outstanding Television Movie for The Normal Heart (2014)
- Tony Award for Best Musical for Dear Evan Hansen (2016)
