= Rutherford Cravens =

American actor

Rutherford "Ruddy" Cravens is an American actor who primarily works on stage. He has been in three Oscar-winning films: Ray (2004), No Country for Old Men (2007), and Get Out (2017). Rutherford Cravens appears annually in the Houston Shakespeare Festival.

== Filmography ==
Year	Title	Role	Notes
1990	RoboCop 2	Reporter #1	
1994	North and South: Book III	Ulysses S. Grant	Miniseries
1994	Gambler V: Playing for Keeps	Officer	TV movie
1997	Rough Riders	Man #2	Miniseries
1997-1998	Walker, Texas Ranger	Mr. Baumgartner/Dick Corman	2 episodes
2004	The Alamo	Mr. Smith	
2004	Ray	White Promoter	
2007	No Country for Old Men	Gun Store Clerk	
2010	Temple Grandin	Feedlot Guard	TV movie
2011	Breaking Bad	Mortgage Broker	Episode: Shotgun
2012	Nashville	Joe	Episode: Someday You'll Call My Name
2017	Get Out	Parker Dray	
2017	Preacher	Store Owner	Episode: On the Road
2022	Mo	Jim	Episode: Hamoodi
