= Wesley Chapel AME Church (Georgetown, Texas) =

Historic church in Texas, United States

- Wesley Chapel A.M.E Church
- U.S. National Register of Historic Places
- Recorded Texas Historic Landmark
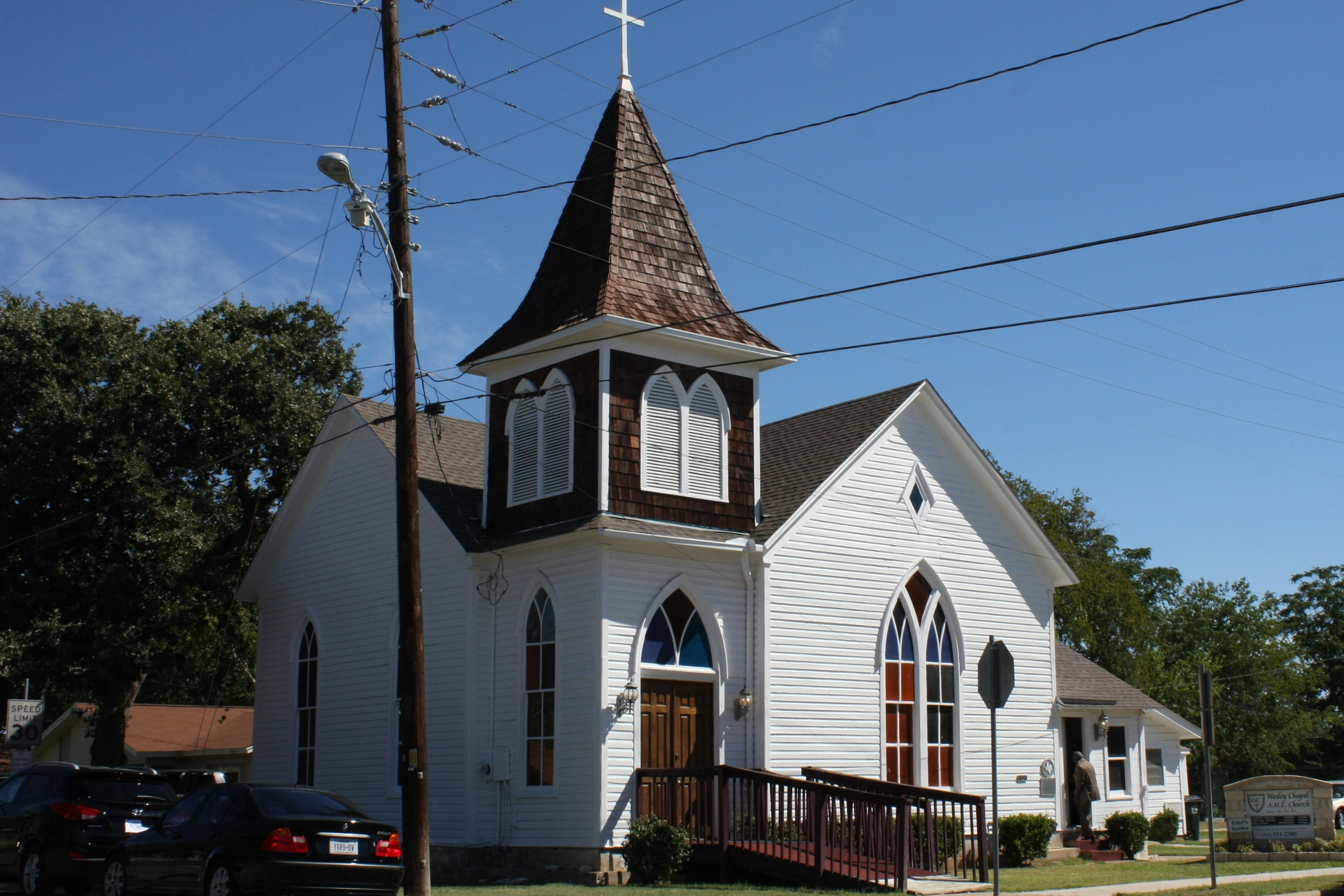
- Wesley Chapel A.M.E Church in 2012

- Location within Texas Location within the United States
- Location: 508 W. Fourth, Georgetown, Texas
- Coordinates: 30°38′24″N 97°40′53″W
- Area: less than one acre
- Built: 1904
- Architectural style: Gothic Revival
- MPS: Georgetown MRA
- NRHP reference No.: 86000204
- RTHL No.: 13895

Significant dates
- Added to NRHP: January 14, 1986
- Designated RTHL: 1984

Wesley Chapel A.M.E Church is a historic church at 508 W. Fourth in Georgetown, Texas.

It was built in 1904 and added to the National Register in 1986.

== Notable members ==
- Michelle Barnes, artist and arts administrator.

== See also ==
- National Register of Historic Places listings in Williamson County, Texas
- Recorded Texas Historic Landmarks in Williamson County
