= Jane Blaffer Owen =

American philanthropist and heir (1915–2010)

- Born: April 18, 1915; Houston, Texas
- Died: June 21, 2010 (aged 95)
- Parents: Robert Lee Blaffer (father); Sarah Campbell Blaffer (mother)

Jane Blaffer Owen (April 18, 1915 – June 21, 2010) was a patron of the arts, author, and heir to the Humble Oil fortune (a predecessor of Exxon-Mobil). She and her husband, Kenneth Dale Owen, helped resettle the community of New Harmony, Indiana north of Evansville, Indiana. She commissioned the Roofless Church. She received the Sachem Award in 2007. She wrote New Harmony, Indiana: Like a River, Not a Lake: A Memoir.

Blaffer was born in Houston. She studied at The Kinkaid School and then Ethel Walker School in Connecticut. She went on to Bryn Mawr College, Washington School of Diplomacy, and the Union Theological Seminary. Her husband is a descendant of Utopian industrialist Robert Owen.

She trained as a dancer. She supported the work of many architects and artists, and was close friends with Tamara de Lempicka. She also funded the University of Houston's Blaffer Art Museum.

She received the Louise Dupont Crowninshield Award from the National Trust for Historic Preservation in 2008 for her work on New Harmony and received an honorary doctorate from Purdue University in 2008.
