= Seth Gilliam =

American actor (born 1968)

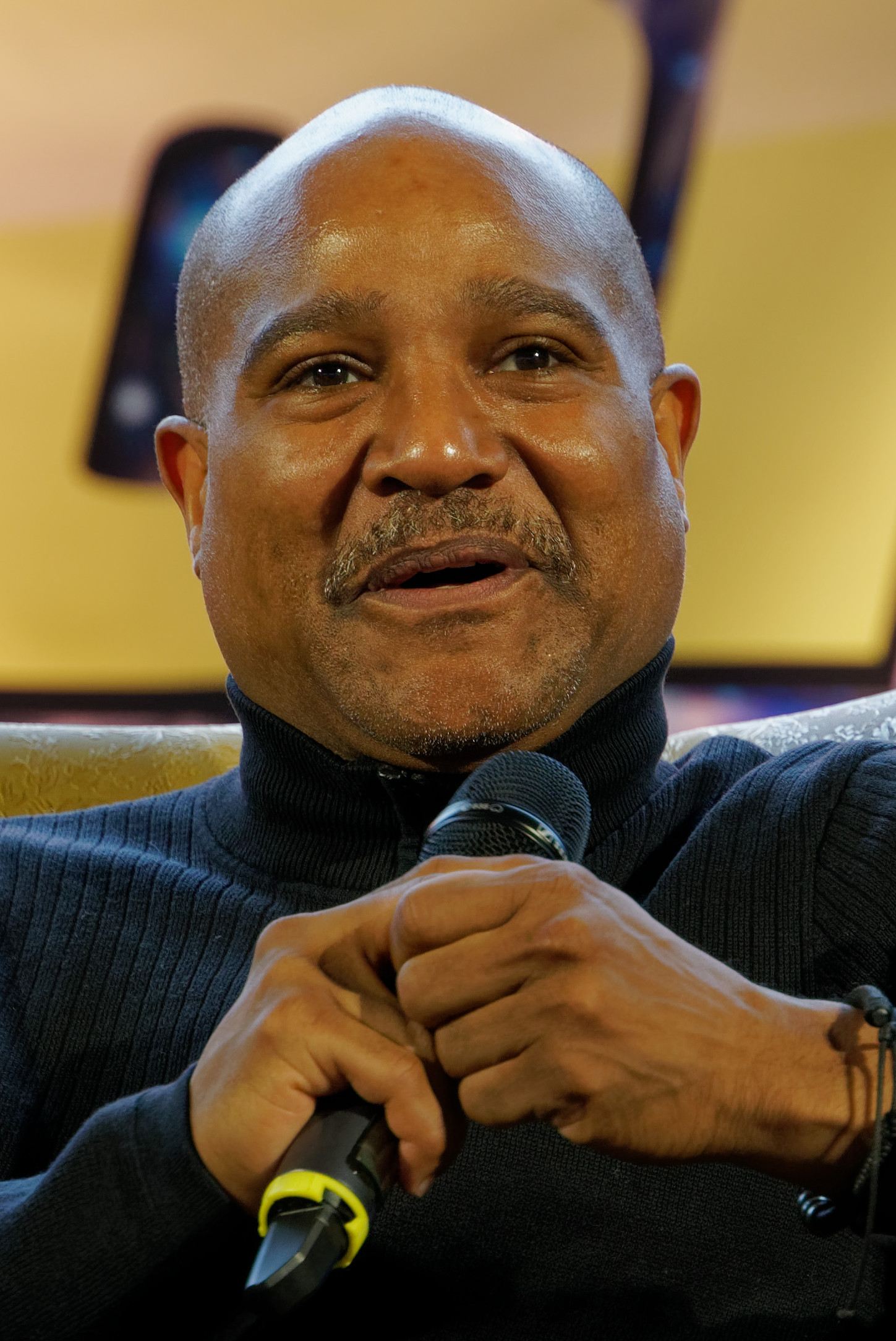
- Gilliam in 2020
- Born: November 5, 1968 (age 57); New York City, U.S.
- Education: State University of New York, Purchase (BFA)
- Occupation: Actor
- Years active: 1990–present
- Known for: The Wire as Ellis Carver; The Walking Dead as Gabriel Stokes; Teen Wolf as Dr. Alan Deaton

Seth Gilliam (born November 5, 1968) is an American actor. He is best known for his portrayals of Ellis Carver on The Wire, Clayton Hughes on Oz, Dr. Alan Deaton on Teen Wolf, and Father Gabriel Stokes on The Walking Dead.

== Early life ==
Gilliam graduated from State University of New York at Purchase in 1990, earning a Bachelor of Fine Arts degree in acting.

== Career ==
Gilliam's film career began in the early 1990s. He has starred in award-winning films such as Still Alice. His other film credits include Sergeant Sugar Watkins in the 1997 action film Starship Troopers and Sergeant Steven Altameyer in the 1996 film Courage Under Fire.

Gilliam has had a number of recurring roles on television, including during the seventh season of The Cosby Show as Aaron Dexter, boyfriend of Erika Alexander's character, and as Alan Deaton on Teen Wolf. His most prominent role has been on The Wire. In 2008, he attracted attention for criticizing the show being overlooked for Emmy nominations despite its critical success. He has had a number of guest roles in other shows such as CSI: Miami, Nurse Jackie, Skins, Person of Interest, and The Good Wife. He played Clayton Hughes on Oz. In May 2014, Gilliam was cast as Father Gabriel Stokes in the fifth season of AMC's The Walking Dead. Along with Chad L. Coleman and Lawrence Gilliard Jr., he is the third The Wire alum to join the series.

Gilliam has acted on stage, playing Prince Edward in a 1993 production of Richard III. He played the title role in Othello, first in 2010 at Boston's Commonwealth Shakespeare Company and then the following year at the Houston Shakespeare Festival, directed by his wife, Leah C. Gardiner. The pair returned to Houston in 2013 for Antony and Cleopatra, with Gilliam playing Antony and Gardiner directing. Gilliam has stated that he prefers acting on the stage although he loves his work in film and television: "Acting for the stage is a lot more fun to do. There is instant communication with the audience. An actor can tell whether or not he or she is connecting with an audience or whether they understand what's going on."

== Personal life ==
On May 3, 2015, Gilliam was arrested in Peachtree City, Georgia, for driving under the influence as he was speeding 108 miles per hour in a fifty-five miles per hour zone. Police found a marijuana cigarette in his car. He was released after posting a $9,818 bond.

== Filmography ==
=== Film ===
Year	Title	Role	Notes
1992	In the Eyes of a Stranger	-	TV movie
1992	Aibobo	-	Short
1993	Joey Breaker	Jeremy Breaker	
1993	Mr. Wonderful	ER Doctor	
1994	Heading Home	Willie	
1994	The Hardest Part	Derek	Short
1995	Jefferson in Paris	James Hemings	
1996	Courage Under Fire	Altameyer	
1996	Tar	Tyrone	
1997	Starship Troopers	Sugar Watkins	
2000	Punks	Marcus	
2002	Personal Velocity: Three Portraits	Vincent	
2005	The Great Wonderful	Clayton	
2008	Sympathetic Details	Raymond	
2009	The People v. Leo Frank	Jim Conley	
2009	Did You Hear About the Morgans?	U.S. Marshal Lasky	
2010	Betrayed	Roger Waite	Short
2011	Stake Out: Atlantic Salmon	Rivers	Short
2012	The Skinny	HIV Testing Worker	
2014	Still Alice	Frederic Johnson	
2017	Police State	Officer Grady	
2018	Change in the Air	Officer Payne	
2018	Silver Lake	Jeff	
2023	Teen Wolf: The Movie	Dr. Alan Deaton	

=== Television ===
Year	Title	Role	Notes
1990–1991	The Cosby Show	Aaron Dexter	Recurring cast (season 7)
1992	Law & Order	Babatunde Amoda	Episode: "Consultation"
1994	Assault at West Point: The Court-Martial of Johnson Whittaker	Cadet Johnson C. Whittaker	TV movie
1999–2001	Oz	Clayton Hughes	Recurring cast (seasons 3–4); 17 episodes
2002–2008	The Wire	Ellis Carver	Recurring cast (seasons 1–2), main cast (seasons 3–5); 51 episodes
2005	Law & Order: Trial by Jury	A.D.A. Terence Wright	Recurring cast
2007	The Bronx is Burning	Paul Blair	Episode: "Time for a Change?"
2007–2008	Law & Order: Criminal Intent	Detective Daniels	Guest (season 6), recurring cast (season 7)
2009	Damages	Mark Waters	Episode: "I Knew Your Pig"
2009	CSI: Miami	Aaron Nolan	Episode: "Flight Risk"
2009	Mercy	Police Officer	Episode: "Destiny, Meet My Daughter, Veronica"
2010	Nurse Jackie	Dr. Lindsey	Episode: "Candyland"
2010	Law & Order	Michael's Attorney	Episode: "Immortal"
2011	Skins	Ken	Episode: "Cadie"
2011	Svetlana	Tomas	Episode: "Milking It"
2011	The Good Wife	Jacob Rickter	Episode: "Closing Arguments"
2011–2017	Teen Wolf	Dr. Alan Deaton	Recurring cast (seasons 1–5), guest (season 6); 47 episodes
2012	Person of Interest	Detective Des Franklin	Episode: "Identity Crisis"
2012	Homeland	Chapman	Episode: "A Gettysburg Address"
2013	Criminal Minds	Lyle Johnson	Episode: "Strange Fruit"
2014–2022	The Walking Dead	Gabriel Stokes	Also starring (seasons 5–7), main cast (seasons 8–11); 73 episodes
2015	The Good Wife	Jacob Rickter	Episode: "Wanna Partner?"
2016	Elementary	Dr. Ira Wallace	Episode: "Ready or Not"
2019	The Code	Lt. Col. Metchaf	Episode: "Original Pilot"
2019	City on a Hill	Rev. Jasper Fields	Recurring cast (season 1)
2020	Bull	Dr. Poulson	Episode: "The Invisible Woman"
2023	The Blacklist	Lawrence Whitaker	Episode: "Blair Foster"
2024	The Walking Dead: The Ones Who Live	Gabriel Stokes	Episode: "Become"

== Theater ==
Year	Title	Role	Notes
2010	Othello	Othello	Commonwealth Shakespeare Company
2011	Othello	Othello	Houston Shakespeare Festival
2011	King Lear	Edmund	The Public Theater
2018	The Last Bar at the End of the World	Tobias	Off-Broadway
