= Moores School of Music =

Music school of the University of Houston

Coordinates: 29.725156°N 95.344017°W

- Type: Public
- Established: 1940
- Affiliations: University of Houston; CotA
- Director: Robert Walzel (interim)
- Faculty: 80
- Students: 600
- Location: Houston, Texas
- Website: music.uh.edu

The Rebecca and John J. Moores School of Music is the music school of the University of Houston. The Moores School offers the Bachelor of Music, Bachelor of Arts in Music, Master of Music, and Doctor of Musical Arts degrees in music performance, conducting, theory and composition, music history and literature, pedagogy, and music education and also offers a Certificate of Music Performance. It is a component of the University of Houston's Kathrine G. McGovern College of the Arts. The Moores School is a fully accredited member of the National Association of Schools of Music (NASM). Its namesakes are UH alumni John Moores (a businessman and philanthropist) and his former wife Rebecca. As of 2025, the Director of the Moores School was Brian Kai Chin. Robert Walzel is serving as interim director as of 2026.

== History ==
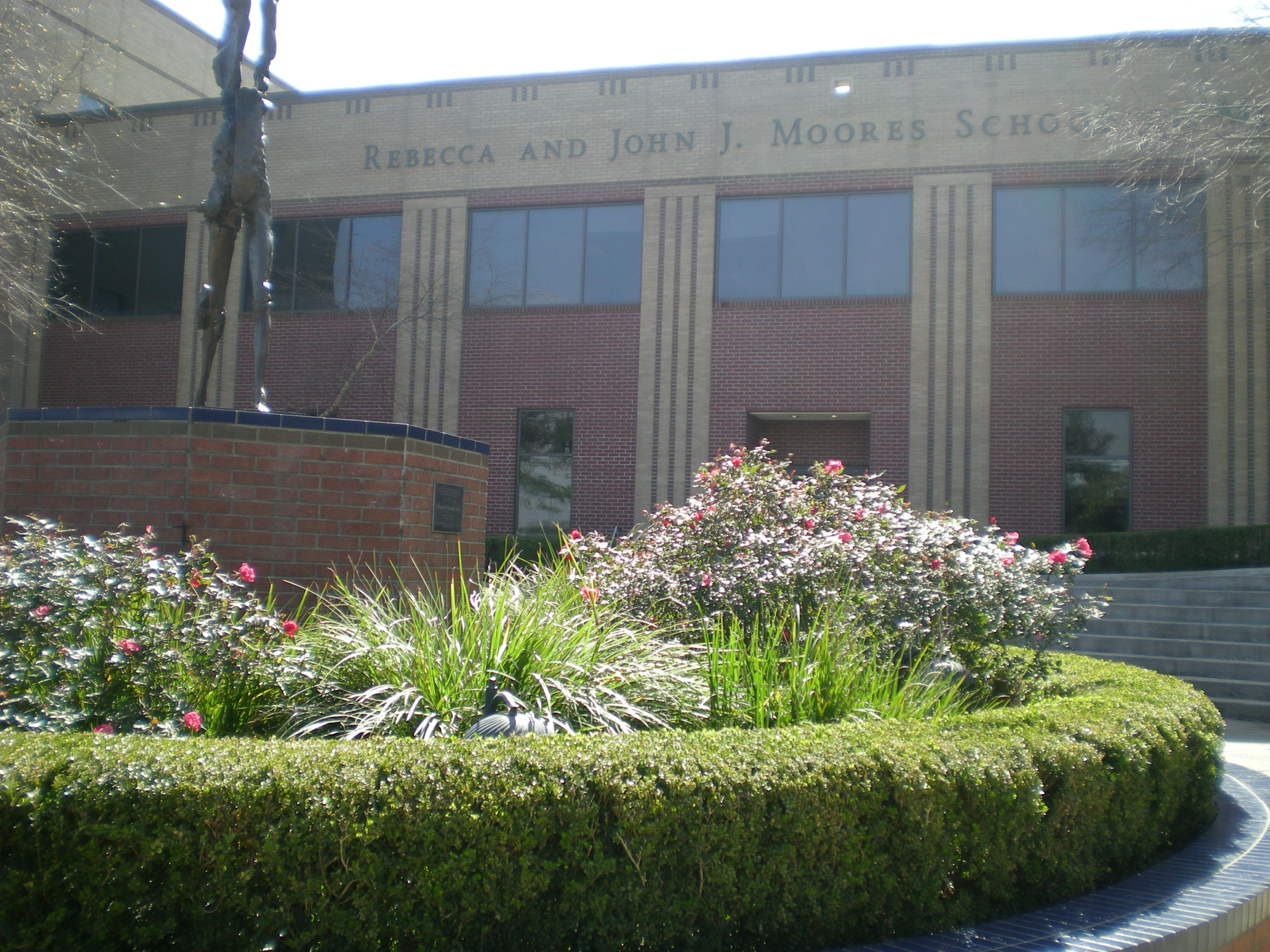
The Rebecca and John J. Moores School of Music

The University of Houston was founded in 1927, and the music department was formed in 1940. In 1969 the department was officially designated as the University of Houston School of Music. In 1972 the School of Music moved into the Fine Arts Building, a facility it shared with the School of Art. A multimillion-dollar gift in 1991 by UH alumni John and Rebecca Moores led to renaming of the school in their honor (media references to the "Moores School of Music" appear as early as fall 1995) and to the construction of the present facility, which began operation in 1997.

Bruce Spencer King, Earl Moore, Robert Briggs, Milton Katims, David Tomatz, David Ashley White, Andrew Davis, Courtney Crappell, Brian Kai Chin, and Robert Walzel have been artistic directors of the school.

== Overview ==
Enrollment in the Moores School stands at nearly 600 music majors, who are instructed by a faculty of 80. Since 1997 the school has been located at the Rebecca and John J. Moores School of Music Building on the University of Houston campus. A large and varied schedule of concerts and recitals featuring students, faculty, and guest performers serves the concertgoing public of Houston throughout the year.

Ensembles at the Moores School include the Wind Ensemble (recipient of multiple Grammy nominations), the Moores School Symphony Orchestra, the Concert Chorale, AURA (a contemporary music ensemble), the Jazz Orchestra, the Mariachi Pumas, the Spirit of Houston Cougar Marching Band, the Symphonic Winds, the Concert Band, the Cougar Brass, the Choral Artists, the Chamber Singers, the Concert Women's Chorus, the Houston Symphony Chorus, the University Men's Chorus, the University Women's Chorus, the Moores School Percussion Ensemble, and Collegium Musicum (early music). The Edythe Bates Old Moores Opera Center presents productions consistently lauded as being of professional quality. As a component of the Cynthia Woods Mitchell Center for the Arts, the Moores School also collaborates for some events, programs, and productions with the School of Art, the Creative Writing Program, the School of Theatre and Dance, and the Blaffer Gallery, the art museum of the University of Houston.

The Houston Opera Studio has provided dozens of world-class opera singers with early professional training and experience. From its inception in 1977 until 1992, the Studio was a partnership between the University of Houston School of Music and Houston Grand Opera; it is now administered solely by HGO.

The Moores School of Music Percussion Ensemble, under the direction of Dr. Blake Wilkins, has also performed at three Percussive Arts Society International Conventions. These showcase concerts were the result of winning three PAS "Call for Tapes" contests. The Moores School Percussion Ensemble is the second ensemble in history to achieve three PAS Showcase concerts. The group has recorded three commercially released compact discs: Surge, released in 2005; Not Here, But There, released in 2009; and the most recent, Everywhere Entangled, which was released in January 2012.

Data indicate that some 80 percent of Moores School graduates stay in the Houston area following graduation, so that a large proportion of the community's professional musical performers and educators are University of Houston alumni. Nevertheless, Moores School graduates in significant numbers can be found on concert stages, on college faculties, and in other leading professional musical roles worldwide.

== Extracurricular programs and activities ==
The Moores School hosts a number of musical activities outside the scope of its basic program of university instruction. These include the following:

- a Division of Preparatory and Continuing Studies, which offers throughout the academic year private and classroom music instruction to the community at large, especially geared to children and adults
- the Texas Music Festival, an annual month-long summer program of concerts with intensive instruction and coaching for young professionals and highly talented students
- the Cougar Band Camp, a week-long summer program
- the International Piano Festival, an annual weekend of concerts and master classes with world-renowned keyboard artists
- an annual Moores School of Music Jazz Festival
- Floot Fire, an annual five-day festival for flutists

In addition, the Moores School of Music is home to chapters of four collegiate music fraternities and one honor society:

- The Beta Sigma chapter of Kappa Kappa Psi, honorary band fraternity, founded January 21, 1950
- The Tau chapter of Tau Beta Sigma, honorary band sorority, founded March 25, 1950.
- The Beta Pi chapter of Sigma Alpha Iota, music fraternity, chartered March 28, 1953.
- The Omicron Upsilon chapter of Phi Mu Alpha Sinfonia fraternity, chartered May 29, 1966.
- The Zeta Tau chapter of Pi Kappa Lambda, music honor society, chartered 1989.

== Facilities ==
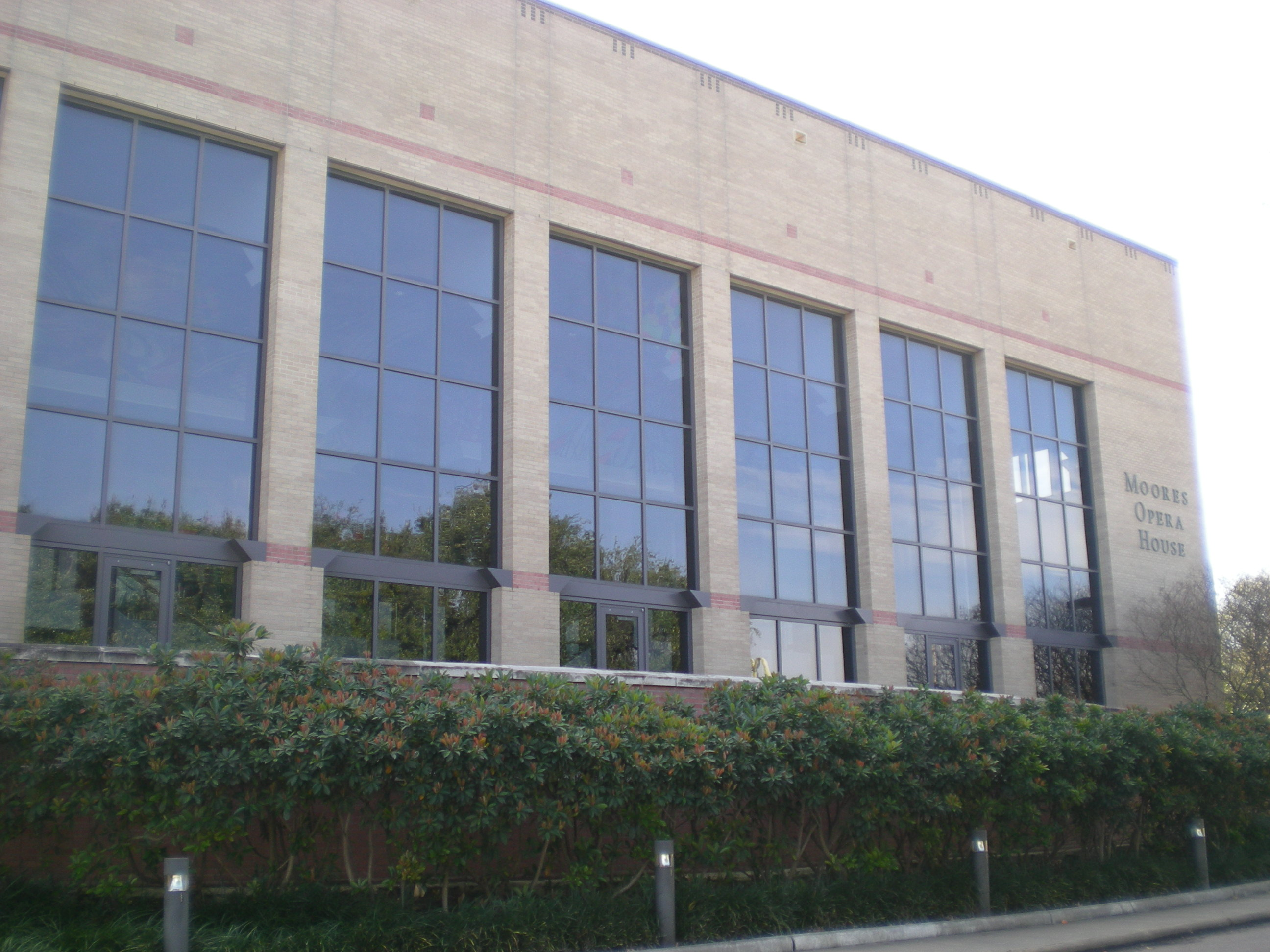
Moores Opera House

Located in the Arts District of the University of Houston campus, the centerpiece of the $24 million Rebecca and John J. Moores School of Music Building is the 800-seat Moores Opera House, which has a ceiling mural by Frank Stella, light fixtures by Isaac Maxwell, and a green room displaying paintings by Ary Stillman. The building has 50 teaching studios and 60 practice rooms, a library, listening and composition facilities, a recording studio, four rehearsal halls for large ensembles, and a lounge. Some facilities in the "old" Fine Arts Building, such as the Dudley Recital Hall and the Organ Hall, are still used by the Moores School.

== Noted faculty and alumni ==
List of University of Houston people

== Sources ==
- "beginning a new era: the moores school of music" by Cydney Mackey. From Collegium, Winter 1997.
- Kriebel, Robert C. Blue Flame: Woody Herman's Life in Music. Purdue IN: Purdue University Press, 1995. ISBN 1-55753-073-4.
- "Texas Heart" by Dennis Rooney. The Strad, January 1990.
