= Jamal Cyrus =

American conceptual artist (born 1973)

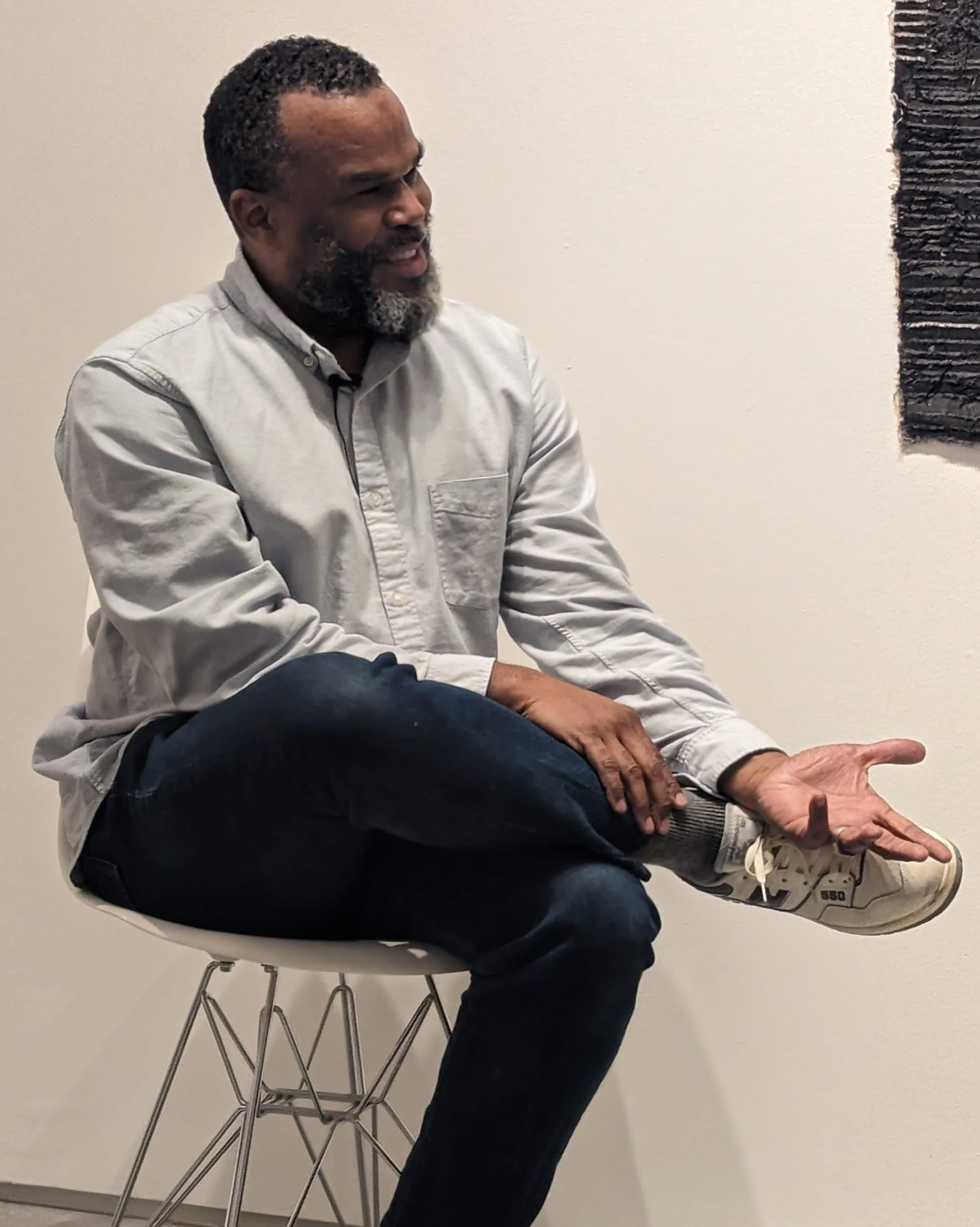
- Born: 1973 (age 52–53); Houston, Texas
- Education: MFA, University of Pennsylvania; Philadelphia, PA Skowhegan School of Painting and Sculpture; Skowhegan, ME BFA, University of Houston; Houston, TX
- Known for: Sculpture, drawing, textiles, performance, sound
- Spouse: Leslie Hewitt

Jamal Cyrus (born 1973) is an American conceptual artist who works in a range of media, including drawing, sculpture, textiles, assemblage, installation, performance, and sound. His artistic and research practices investigates the history, culture, and identity of the United States, questioning conventional narratives and foregrounding Black political movements, social justice concerns, and the experiences and impact of the African diaspora, including Black music.

== Biography ==
Cyrus was born in Houston, Texas, where he lives and works. He received a BFA from the University of Houston in 2004 before attending the Skowhegan School of Painting and Sculpture in 2005. In 2008, he graduated from the MFA program at the University of Pennsylvania. Cyrus was an artist-in-residence at Artpace San Antonio in 2010 and a member of the Otabenga Jones and Associates artist collective from 2002 to 2017.

Jamal Cyrus has been married to artist Leslie Hewitt since 2021.

== Art Work ==
Jamal Cyrus's "Pride Frieze—Jerry White's Record Shop, Central Avenue, Los Angeles" (2005–17) is a work that demonstrates Cyrus's interest in historiography and archival research, sculpture and assemblage, and Black American history, especially music. It is a painstaking reconstruction of a record shop storefront Cyrus saw in a book, featuring a hybrid of real and imagined histories of the Detroit-based "Pride Records" label, with found album covers, altered album covers, and total inventions. This photo was shared in the promotional press packet for the announcement of Jamal Cyrus as the winner of the 6th BMW Art Journey and is one of his most recognizable works.

Cyrus's artistic practice is research-based; he makes use of physical and digital archives to investigate American history and historiography through the lens of Black oppression, liberation, and identity. Working in a range of media and materials, his works combine found images, documents, and objects with paper, graphite, papyrus, denim, and other materials, and includes mixed-media installations, assemblages, sculptures, drawings, performances, sound, and video. In referencing material and iconographic aspects of Black history alongside historical events, interpretations, tropes, fabulations, and mythologies, Cyrus's work addresses themes such as counterculture, surveillance, militancy, revolution, and consumerism.

== Exhibitions ==
Cyrus has exhibited widely in both solo and group shows. His work has been featured at the Whitney Biennial, Art Basel Miami, the Museum of Contemporary Art Chicago, the Akron Art Museum, the Walker Art Center, the Contemporary Arts Museum Houston, the Blaffer Art Museum, the Modern Art Museum of Fort Worth, the Contemporary Art Center, New Orleans, the Mississippi Museum of Art, the Asia Society, the New Museum, the Kitchen, the Museum of Contemporary Art Detroit, the Institute of Contemporary Art, Philadelphia, the Studio Museum in Harlem, the Brooklyn Museum, and the Museum of London Docklands.

In addition, as a member of Otabenga Jones and Associates, Cyrus exhibited at the High Museum, National Museum of African American History and Culture, the California African American Museum, and the Menil Collection, among other venues.

== Awards ==
- John Simon Guggenheim Memorial Foundation Grant (2023)
- David C. Driskell Prize (2020)
- Joan Mitchell Painters and Sculptors Grant (2019)
- BMW Art Journey (2017-2018)
- Smithsonian Artist Research Fellowship (2009)
- Artadia Houston Award (2006)
- Louis Comfort Tiffany Foundation Award (2005)
