= Kathrine G. McGovern College of the Arts =

Art school of the University of Houston

Coordinates: 29.724524°N 95.342482°W

University of Houston Kathrine G. McGovern College of the Arts
- Type: Public
- Established: 2016
- Parent institution: University of Houston
- Dean: Andrew Davis
- Undergraduates: 1100+
- Postgraduates: 200+
- Location: Houston, Texas, United States
- Campus: Urban
- Website: www.uh.edu/kgmca

The Kathrine G. McGovern College of the Arts (KGMCA) is one of thirteen academic colleges at the University of Houston. Established in 2016, the College of the Arts has approximately 1,500 students.

== Schools ==
- School of Art
- Arts Leadership
- Moores School of Music
- School of Theatre and Dance

== Centers ==
- Arts & Technology Center
- Blaffer Gallery
- Center for Arts & Social Engagement
- Cynthia Woods Mitchell Center for the Arts

== Academics ==
The college offers degree programs in the following areas: Fine Arts, Music, Theatre & Dance.
