= Earlie Hudnall, Jr. =

American photographer (1946- )

- Born: 1946 (age 79–80); Hattiesburg, Mississippi, U.S.
- Known for: Photography

Earlie Hudnall, Jr. (1946) is an American photographer. He is known for his documentary photographs of Houston, Texas.

Hudnall was born in 1946 in Hattiesburg, Mississippi. From 1966 through 1967 he served as a Marine during the Vietnam War. He then attended Texas Southern University in Houston.

The Grace Museum held a solo exhibition of Hudnall's work in 2023 entitled As I See It: Earlie Hudnall, Jr. His work was included in the 2025 exhibition Photography and the Black Arts Movement, 1955–1985 at the National Gallery of Art.

His work is in the collection of the Art Institute of Chicago, the Museum of Fine Arts, Houston, the National Gallery of Art, the Smithsonian American Art Museum, and the Studio Museum in Harlem.
