= Lynn Eusan =

American journalist

Lynn Cecilia Eusan
- Lynn in November of 1968
- Born: October 11, 1948; Galveston County, Texas, U.S.
- Died: September 10, 1971 (aged 22); Houston, Texas, U.S.
- Occupation: Journalist
- Known for: First black Homecoming queen at UH

Lynn Cecilia Eusan (October 11, 1948 – September 10, 1971) was an American activist and the first black Homecoming queen at the University of Houston, where she studied journalism, and the first black woman to earn the title at any predominantly white college or university in the Southern United States. Only seven years earlier, UH had been an all-white institution, not integrating until the 1962–63 academic year. In 1971, less than three years after that Homecoming ceremony, she was found dead in the back of a stranger's car. Her death was believed to be a murder, and no one was ever found guilty for her death. A park at the university is named in her honor.

== Personal life ==
Eusan was born on October 11, 1948, in Galveston County, Texas. Her parents, Ida Mae (Boudreaux) Eusan and Wilbur Thirkield Eusan, Sr., were working class. Eusan and her four siblings grew up in San Antonio, Texas.

She graduated from Phillis Wheatley High School in 1966 and immediately enrolled at the University of Houston.

== University of Houston ==
At the University of Houston, Eusan was involved in the Spirit of Houston marching band and worked as a reporter and photojournalist. She majored in education and journalism.

She helped organize the Committee on Better Race Relations at UH, which aimed to "promote racial harmony among the students on the university's campus." One year later, Eusan co-founded African Americans for Black Liberation, which replaced to COBRR. That organization was started with hopes to bring together other races and surrounding communities, including the surrounding Third Ward neighborhood and nearby historically black university Texas Southern University. The group also fund raised for scholarships and created summer programs for black youth.

Eusan was a charter member of the Epsilon Lamba chapter of Alpha Kappa Alpha. She also co-founded SHAPE (Self Help for African People through Education) Community Center in the Third Ward.

On November 22, 1968, Eusan was crowned UH's Homecoming queen over five other white candidates in the Astrodome, becoming the first black homecoming queen at a white Southern university. The African Americans for Black Liberation ran her campaign. The Daily Cougar, the student newspaper, endorsed her candidacy. She continued to advocate for civil rights and black pride as Homecoming queen.

In the weeks leading up to the Homecoming game, Eusan received death threats and white fraternities mocked her in minstrel shows. Through the mocking, Eusan stayed positive. In an interview with the Houston Chronicle two weeks later, Eusan said, "This was the first time black students on the campus have banded together and really been effective against overwhelming odds."

In February 1969, Eusan and 100 other members of the AABL marched to UH President Phillip G. Hoffman's office and presented a list of 10 demands, which included:

- Creation of an African-American studies program
- Hiring more black faculty and staff
- Efforts to recruit and retain black students
- Pay equity and better conditions for menial workers
- Support for inner-city youth programs

Hoffman agreed to some of the group's demands. The same year, the university started the African-American studies program the AABL requested.

Twice, Eusan was arrested for demonstrating. In 1969, she was charged with destruction of public property for her role in a riot on the UH campus. The charges were later dropped. In 1967, she was arrested during a demonstration for better conditions for children in the Sunnyside neighborhood.

== Murder ==
After graduating from UH in 1970, Eusan got a job reporting with Voice of Hope, the media arm of HOPE Development, Inc., in the Fifth Ward. She contributed to Black Enterprise magazine and worked as a secretary. Eusan planned to attend graduate school in North Carolina. The last time anyone saw Eusan, she was waiting at a bus stop in windy, rainy weather on the evening of September 10, 1971.

On September 10, 1971, a car driven by Leo Jackson, Jr. collided with a police vehicle. In the back seat, police found Eusan's body; she had been stabbed several times. Jackson claimed that Eusan had been "hysterical", assaulted him, and then stabbed herself, and that he was on his way to the hospital.

Jackson had been arrested 14 times prior to the incident for charges including rape and armed robbery. Jackson was charged with Eusan's murder, but in 1972, a jury acquitted him. Since then, no one has been charged in connection with Eusan's death.

== Legacy ==
Eusan was buried in the African American Cemetery on the east side of San Antonio. A public memorial service was held at UH.

The sorority Eusan helped charter, Alpha Kappa Alpha, is still active at the university.

The SHAPE Community Center is still active in the Third Ward. The center mobilized voters to elect Houston's first black mayor, organizes an annual Pan African Cultural Festival, and contributed to efforts to build the Third Ward Multi-Service Center.

Three years after Eusan's death, the University of Houston Board of Regents named a park in her honor, called the Lynn Eusan Park. Until the 1980s, the park was home to the university's live mascot, a cougar named Shasta, who resided in a cage. In 2013, the university built a modern stage for the park equipped with lights and a sound system. The park is a hub of student life and activity at the university.

== See also ==
- List of unsolved murders (1900–1979)
