= Shani Crowe =

American interdisciplinary artist

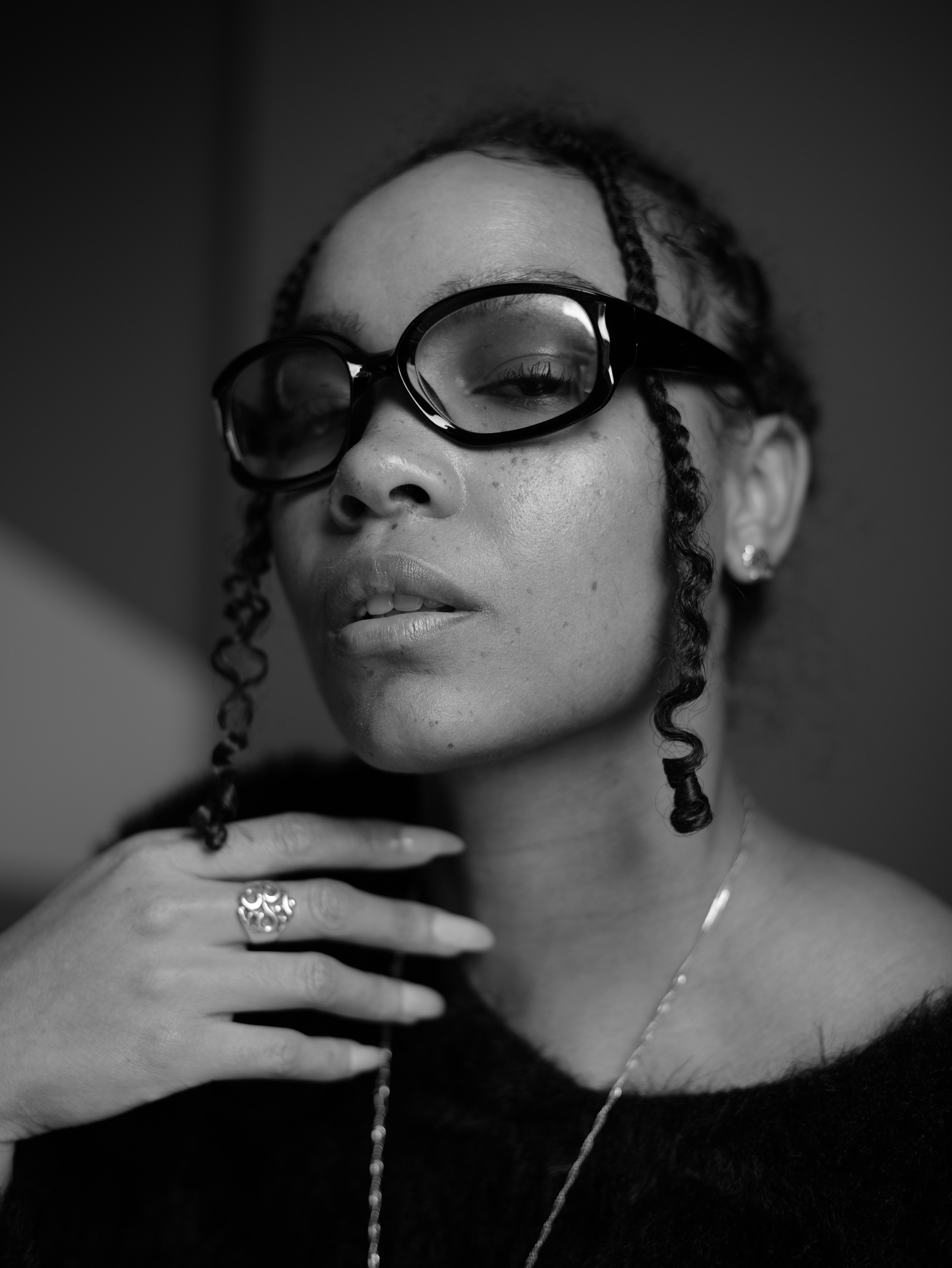
- Crowe in 2022
- Born: 1989 (age 36–37); Chicago, Illinois, U.S.
- Education: Howard University (BFA)
- Known for: Braided sculptural hairstyles, photography, performance art
- Movement: Contemporary art
- Website: shanicrowe.com

Shani Crowe (born 1989) is an American Interdisciplinarity artist whose work explores Afro-textured hair culture, adornment, African diasporic traditions, and beauty rituals through photography, sculpture, performance, and hairstyling. Based in Chicago, Crowe is known for elaborate braided sculptural hairstyles and photographic works that examine Black identity and cultural memory.

Crowe gained broader public recognition for creating braided headpieces worn by singer-songwriter Solange Knowles during performances associated with the album A Seat at the Table, including a 2016 appearance on Saturday Night Live.

== Early life and education ==
Crowe was born in Chicago, Illinois, and raised on the South Side of the city in an Afrocentric household. She attended Howard University, where she studied film production and earned a Bachelor of Fine Arts degree from Howard University's John H. Johnson School of Communications in 2011 (renamed in 2016 to Cathy Hughes School of Communications.

== Career ==
Crowe began developing her artistic practice through hairstyling and photography, using braided hair as both sculptural material and cultural symbol.

Her photographic series Braids features portraits of Black women wearing elaborate braided forms inspired by African aesthetics, spiritual symbolism, and historical coiffure traditions. The work has been widely discussed for its exploration of Black beauty, ancestral memory, and resistance to Eurocentric beauty standards.

In 2016, Crowe collaborated with Solange Knowles on braided headpieces for performances and visual works connected to A Seat at the Table. Her braided halo worn by Knowles during a Saturday Night Live performance received widespread media attention.

Crowe's work has been exhibited internationally and included in museums, galleries, and cultural institutions including the Museum of Contemporary African Diasporan Arts (MoCADA), the Venice Architecture Biennale, and exhibitions connected to architecture and civic identity.

In 2021, Crowe appeared in a Bloomberg Originals feature discussing Afro-textured hair and cultural narratives surrounding beauty and identity.

== Artistic style and themes ==
Crowe's work frequently centers Black hair as a site of cultural preservation, spirituality, adornment, and political expression. She has described hair braiding as a communal and ancestral practice tied to storytelling and identity formation.

Her work combines elements of sculpture, performance, portraiture, and fashion while drawing influence from African hairstyling traditions and contemporary Black visual culture.

== Selected exhibitions ==
- Braids
- Dimensions of Citizenship
- Venice Architecture Biennale (2018)
- Thrival Geographies
