= Cynthia Woods Mitchell Center for the Arts =

Creative and performing arts venue in Texas

Coordinates: 29°43′29″N 95°20′33″W

- Established: 2003
- Location: University of Houston
- Director: Karen Farber
- Website: mitchellcenterforarts.org

The Cynthia Woods Mitchell Center for the Arts is a creative and performing arts space based at the University of Houston. The Center invites artists and creative thinkers to the university to showcase their work, develop new projects, lead workshops, and teach courses. The Center also commissions and produces new works.

The center was founded in 2003 to promote innovative collaboration and interchange between artists. The center also forms a hub for the five arts school at the University of Houston: the School of Art, the Moores School of Music, the School of Theatre and Dance, the Creative Writing Program, and the Blaffer Art Museum.

== History ==
The Mitchell Center was founded in 2003 to unite all the arts programs that exist on the University of Houston campus. Funding for the Mitchell Center came from a contribution from philanthropist and businessman George P. Mitchell, whose desire was to impact the creative arts programs at the University of Houston. The Center was named in honor of his late wife, Cynthia Woods Mitchell, a strong lover of the arts.

An endowment of $20 million was given to support the Center, with $16 million designated for the programs and $4 million to renovate the School of Theatre and Dance facility. The renovation included creating new studios, a lobby for the Wortham Theatre, and offices for the newly established Mitchell Center. In December 2005, Karen Farber was hired as the first full-time director.

== Residences and special projects ==
Mitchell Center invites artists for interdisciplinary residencies on a semester basis. Projects can be research-based, public art, academic, or part of a larger thematic initiative.

Past artists include:
Terry & Jo Harvey Allen
Philip Glass
Liz Lerman
ETHEL
Fritz Haeg
Big Dance Theater
The Art Guys
Ronald K. Brown
Negativland
Dick Hebdige
Mark Doty
Joan Tower
Center for Land Use Interpretation
Marc Bamuthi Joseph
SIMPARCH
Jeremy Deller

== Education and the Interdisciplinary Art minor (IART) ==
In 2008, the Mitchell Center created a new minor, the Interdisciplinary Arts Minor (IART), available to UH students from all colleges and majors. IART courses are sponsored by two or more UH departments and taught by various faculty, visiting scholars, and practitioners. The minor includes academic study in the historical and contemporary examples of interdisciplinary arts. It provides opportunities for students of all majors and academic fields to engage in multidisciplinary projects, utilizing the funding and resources of the Mitchell Center.

Mitchell Center also supports an annual Curatorial Fellowship position at Blaffer Art Museum. It offers yearly scholarships to graduate students interested in cross-disciplinary collaboration and studying in the fields of Art, Creative Writing, Music, and Theatre.

The Mitchell Center also hosts a series of lectures and conversations with renowned visitors (artists, writers, choreographers, academics, and musicians) to discuss how collaboration has influenced their artistic development. These conversations encourage communication about cross-disciplinary works and promote deeper engagement and exploration.

In 2007, the Mitchell Center developed the Faculty Affiliate Network (FAN) to connect the arts with other areas of the UH campus. FAN is meant to create direct communication between visual artists, performers, writers, and colleagues of the UH faculty and staff for collaboration, dialogue, and sharing of expertise.

== See also ==
- Lacy M. Johnson
