= William Hardy (actor) =

American actor

- Born: January 19, 1933; Houston, Texas, U.S.
- Died: October 14, 2008 (aged 75)
- Education: University of Houston
- Occupations: Actor, director

William Hardy was an American actor and theatre director with a lifelong career on both the stage and screen.

== Early career ==
William Hardy's first professional job was at Bob Bartel's Houston Melodrama Theatre while still in college. He graduated from the University of Houston with a double major in theater and languages and joined Houston's then-new Alley Theatre. He was a company member for twenty years, appearing in a diversity of roles in such plays as Camino Real, A Flea in Her Ear, Hadrian VII, The Taming of the Shrew, and The Hostage, along with roles at other Texas venues, including the musical Camelot where he played King Arthur. In 1970 he appeared in the Emmy Award-winning My Sweet Charlie, which filmed on location in Port Bolivar, Texas. A director as well as a performer, Hardy spent six summers as the artistic director of the Point Summer Theater in Ingram, Texas, and he "came, saw and conquered like two Caesars" when he took on the resident director's position at Alberta's Civic Theater in 1961, acting in his premier directorial production, the British Farce See How They Run and going on to direct Shakespeare's As You Like It with the Players at Rice University. Hardy was part of over 90 productions during this time. Decades later, when planning the repertoire for his own Houston theater, he credited his time spent at the Alley, as well as the Alley's founder, Nina Vance, for shaping his own eclectic tastes. "Nina did plays that she thought Houston needed to see, but she also did whatever was necessary to keep the doors open."

== National Tour ==
In January 1979, with Hardy in the role of Sheriff Ed Earl Dodd, The Best Little Whorehouse in Texas opened in Houston at the Tower Theatre. This was the first Broadway musical to have an open-ended, run in Texas, and it was Co-author and co-director Peter Masterson who wanted Hardy to play the part. When the Broadway producers launched the show's National Tour starring Alexis Smith, Hardy was the choice for co-star. He stayed with the production for more than three years, his performance praised for making "a poignant as well as comic figure of Sheriff Ed Earl Dodd". It was during this tour that he met and married fellow company member Susan Shofner.

== New York ==
In 1982 Hardy and Shofner moved to New York City and lived there for a decade. Hardy worked in television, in films and on stage, including on Broadway as understudy for John Cullum opposite George C Scott in the two-man play The Boys in Autumn, and Off-Broadway in the musical To Whom it May Concern by Best Little Whorehouse songwriter Carol Hall and directed by Geraldine Fitzgerald in which he again appeared with Shofner. He was also seen on regional stages, in 1983 in Arthur Miller's The Price at Pittsburg Public Theater and in 1987 as John Hancock in the musical 1776 at Massachusetts' North Shore Music Theatre. and in 1990 in Arthur, the musical at Connecticut's Goodspeed Opera House. In 1991 he joined Sidney Poitier and Burt Lancaster in the cast of the Emmy winning mini-series Separate But Equal, playing Supreme Court Justice Tom C. Clark, one of his favorite assignments.

== Houston Again ==
As guest artist in Curtains' The Ascension of Flying Ranger, Hardy returned to Houston in 1992, "full of optimism and enthusiasm" about establishing his own fully professional theater company, a "lifelong dream", and "not just an Equity house, but a bigger Equity house which can do the larger shows for a larger audience." While working with Masterson to that end, Hardy returned to the Alley in The Front Page as the crooked Mayor and in Keely and Du as the patriarchal leader of underground Christian kidnappers. In the summer of 1994, after three years of fundraising, galvanizing support and attracting talent, Hardy's Houston Repertory Theater presented The Night Hank William Died by Little Whorehouse author Larry L. King with Hardy directing. and later that year Christmas Twist. Hardy proceeded to work in "every theatrical venue," both acting and directing. At Stages he not only directed The Moon is Blue but played the Marquis de Sade in Quills and the desperate professor mentoring the troubled young pianist in Old Wicked Songs, where Hardy and Daniel Magill created "the sort of chemistry that makes for magic." In 2002 Hardy "plowed right in" to portray "the awful truth" of Alzheimer's in Nagle Jackson's Taking Leave, and in 2003 he played the comic, good, old shepherd in Houston Shakespeare Festival's The Winter's Tale. At the Houston Grand Opera in 2005 artistic director David Gockley said Hardy "stole the show without singing a note" in the non-singing role of Ambrogio in The Barber of Seville, cleaning a chandelier and holding on as it rose higher and higher over the stage. Hardy's last role was in Terence Malick's film Tree of Life
