= SHAPE Community Center =

- Formation: June 1, 1969; 56 years ago
- Founders: Lynn Eusan; Deloyd Parker
- Type: Nonprofit
- Tax ID no.: 23-7176982
- Location: 3815 Live Oak Street, Houston, TX 77004; 3903 Almeda Road, Houston, TX 77004
- Region served: Third Ward, Houston
- Website: shape.org

SHAPE Community Center is a community center located in the Third Ward area of Houston, Texas. Founded on June 1, 1969 by Lynn Eusan and Deloyd Parker, SHAPE is an acronym for Self Help for African People through Education. The center provides an array of multi-service programs, such as child care, after school programs, support groups, workshops, elder care, legal assistance, business incubation, and community enrichment events. In 2023, SHAPE Community Center was designated one of eleven "Houston Cultural Treasures" by the BIPOC Arts Network and Fund for its work exposing Houston residents to the arts.

Since 1979, SHAPE has organized its Pan-African Cultural Festival on May 25 in celebration of Africa Day. The festival's purpose is to raise awareness of African history and culture among Black people in Houston. It has grown from 100 attendees in its first year to more than 1,000 coming to experience performances, food, and vendors.

== Buildings ==
- Harambee Building, 3903 Almeda Road, Houston, TX 77004
- Nia Becnel Family Center, 3815 Live Oak Street, Houston, TX 77004 (temporarily closed due to fire damage)

=== 2025 fire at the Nia Becnel Family Center ===
On January 19, 2025 an electrical fire broke out at the Family Center building on Live Oak street, causing an estimated $500,000 in damage to the building and destroying a great deal of memorabilia documenting Black history. SHAPE has started a restoration campaign to raise $2.5 million to rebuild and restore the building along with its programs.

== See also ==
- Third Ward, Houston
