= Blaffer Art Museum =

Museum at the University of Houston

Coordinates: 29°43′29″N 95°20′33″W

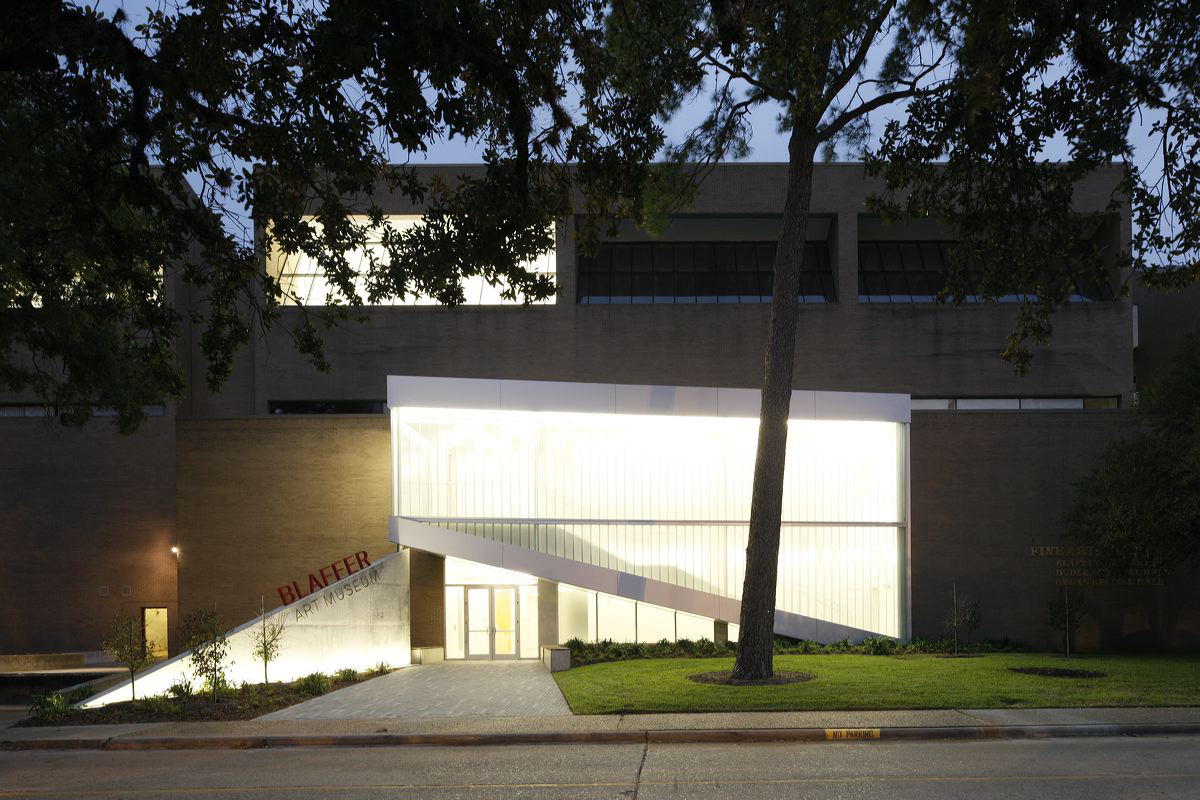
- Established: 1973
- Location: University of Houston
- Visitors: 30,000+
- Directors: Laura Augusta 2024-present; Steven Matijcio 2019–2024; Claudia Schmuckli 2009–2016; Terrie Sultan 2000–2008
- Website: blafferartmuseum.org

Blaffer Art Museum is a non-collecting contemporary art museum located in the Arts District of the University of Houston campus. Housed in the university’s Fine Arts Building, it is part of the Kathrine G. McGovern College of the Arts. It was founded in 1973 and has won several awards, including the Coming Up Taller Award as part of the President's Committee on the Arts and Humanities. The museum presents focus and major monographic and group exhibitions of national and international contemporary artists as well as artwork by University of Houston School of Art students.

== History ==
The Sarah Campbell Blaffer Gallery was founded in 1973, named in honor of the late Sarah Campbell Blaffer, who during her lifetime made available to the University a collection of major artworks dating from the 15th century to modern day. This collection was purchased in 1979 by the Blaffer Foundation, an independent organization which is unrelated to the museum and the University, and has been housed at The Museum of Fine Arts, Houston since that time. The income from the investment of the sale proceeds provides a portion of Blaffer Gallery's program budget. The Blaffer Art Museum has presented over 250 exhibitions. The current exhibition policy, adopted by the Advisory Board and University Regents in 1986, focuses upon art of the past 100 years and its artistic, cultural and intellectual antecedents. In 1999, the museum expanded.

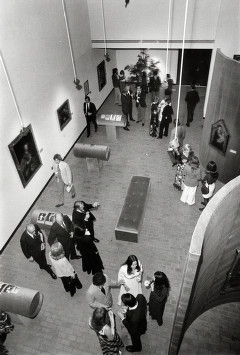
View of the Sarah Campbell Blaffer Gallery during its founding year, March 1973

The museum created and hosts education and outreach programs. In 1988, UHReach was founded and in 1998 Young Artists Apprenticeship Program (YAAP) was founded.

The Blaffer Art Museum was honored by the Institute of Museum and Library Services on November 4, 2009 when first lady Michelle Obama awarded the museum with the Coming Up Taller Award. The award gives $10,000 to art programs that help underprivileged youth.

In 2010, Blaffer Gallery was renamed to Blaffer Art Museum in the context of a major capital campaign for the museum's redesign. The newly-renovated museum facility designed by the New York-based firm Work Architecture Co. opened on October 12, 2012.

== Exhibitions ==
The museum presents and originates between six and eight exhibitions annually. The annual schedule may include major traveling exhibitions that have a particular relevance to Houston audiences; mid-sized retrospectives of national and international artists; exhibitions of regional artists; thematic surveys which place artists' work into new contexts; student exhibitions; and special projects and performances by local artists. Blaffer Art Museum is dedicated to conducting original scholarship and research in contemporary art history. The museum frequently forges collaborative partnerships from among Houston's wealth of cultural organizations and educational institutions. Exhibition-related public programs and activities complement and elucidate each exhibition, from casual Brown Bag Lunch Tours to lively audience interaction during their "Contemporary Salons."

Recent major exhibitions of artists include Radcliffe Bailey (2001); Fred Wilson: Objects & Installations, 1979-2000 (2003); Chuck Close (2003); Jessica Stockholder: Kissing the Wall, 1988-2003 (2004); Urs Fischer: Mary Poppins (2006); Amy Sillman (2007); Jean-Luc Mylayne (2007); Chantal Akerman: Moving Through Time and Space (2008); Existed: Leonardo Drew (2009); Jon Pylypchuk (2009); Josephine Meckseper (2009); Gabriel Kuri (2010); Tony Feher (2012); Andy Coolquitt (2013); Feast: Radical Hospitality in Contemporary Art (2013); Zineb Sedira (2013); Candice Breitz (2014); Miguel Amat (2014); Mel Chin (2015); Janet Biggs (2015); Hubbard/Birchler (2015); Zina Saro-Wiwa (2015); Matthew Ronay (2016); Hilary Lloyd (2016); Slavs and Tatars: Mirrors for Princes (2016); Analia Saban (2017); Blake Rayne (2017); The Propeller Group (2017); Sergio Prego (2017); Anton Vidokle (2018); Richard Rezac (2018); Alfred Leslie (2018–19); Rebecca Morris (2019); Amie Siegel (2019); Paul Mpagi Sepuya (2019–20); Mariam Ghani (2020); Rodney McMillian (2020); Simon Fujiwara (2020); Stephanie Syjuco (2020); Martine Gutierrez (2021); Jamal Cyrus (2021); Molly Zuckerman-Hartung (2021); and Monira Al Qadiri (2022).

Blaffer Art Museum is free to the public and attracts over 30,000 visitors annually.

== Programs ==
In 1988, Blaffer Gallery began a unique educational program for school children, UHReach. This program is now recognized nationally as an exemplary, multi-faceted outreach initiative. Blaffer has built intensive relationships with 18 elementary, middle and high schools in the neighborhoods surrounding the museum and UHReach serves schools from 24 area districts. Students from University of Houston and Texas Southern University are extensively trained and employed as docents for UHReach. They lead dialogue-based tours of the exhibitions and also visit school classrooms to conduct pre- and post-tour activities.

In 1998 the Blaffer Gallery founded the Young Artists Apprenticeship Program (YAAP), which provides a free after-school arts program to at-risk and special needs high school students. It is a six-week, after-school workshop and provides an in-depth exploration of an artistic medium, such as printmaking or videography. Students work with Blaffer staff and University of Houston students to create art, study current exhibitions and take field trips to local museums and galleries. The program finishes with a final project which is displayed in a museum exhibition and the top two students in the program win college scholarships.

== Education ==
Education programs are central to Blaffer Art Museum's mission to serve as a resource for the study of art, art history and other related disciplines. By extending the educational and scholarly programs of the University to the community, the museum promotes learning as a continuous process, linking contemporary ideas and people. Through a broad range of programs, Blaffer presents enriching museum experiences while providing arts education opportunities for audiences of all ages and backgrounds.
