= University of Houston College of Liberal Arts and Social Sciences =

Coordinates: 29.722178°N 95.344036°W

The College of Liberal Arts and Social Sciences (CLASS) is one of 14 academic colleges at the University of Houston. With nearly 10,000 students, CLASS is the largest college of the university, and was established in 2000 after the College of Humanities, Fine Arts, and Communication and the College of Social Sciences merged.

== Departments ==
- Communication Sciences and Disorders
- Comparative Cultural Studies
- Economics
- English
- Health and Human Performance
- Hispanic Studies
- History
- Jack J. Valenti School of Communication
- Modern and Classical Languages
- Philosophy
- Political Science
- Psychology
- Sociology

== Facilities ==
- Cynthia Woods Mitchell Center for the Arts
- Texas Institute for Measurement, Evaluations and Statistics
- Psychology Research and Services Center

== Academics ==
The college offers degree programs in the following areas: African American Studies, Anthropology, Communication, Communication Sciences & Disorders, Economics, English, Folklore, Hispanic Studies, History, Modern & Classical Languages, Philosophy, Political Science, Psychology, Public Administration, Religious Studies, ROTC, Sociology, Visual Studies, and Women's Studies.

In 1987 Harold Jones, the chairperson of the Hispanic and Classical Languages department, said that the Spanish language was so popular at UH that not every student is able to fill a Spanish class. Jones said that the students are aware that Houston has important ties with Latin America and that learning a second language improves career opportunities. Because of a state budgetary crisis, UH was unable to add enough classes to fill the demand.

Around 1987 the school revised its first and second year Spanish courses to emphasize reading, speaking, understanding, and writing skills. Jones said that most students demand an emphasis on practical knowledge of Spanish, instead of a concentration on culture and literature found in traditional language courses. In 1987 UH offered a special Spanish program available to students in the Hilton College of Hotel and Restaurant Management where they could take a Spanish class catering to their program.

== Publications ==
The college offers several publications including Gulf Coast, a literary journal, and its undergraduate counterpart Glass Mountain and Houston History Magazine, published by the Center for Public History.

== Miscellaneous ==
- The university is associated with the Gulf Coast magazine.
- University of Houston Creative Writing Program
