= List of people from Selma, Alabama =

The people listed below were all born in, residents of, or otherwise closely associated with Selma, Alabama:

== Activism ==
- Patricia Swift Blalock – librarian and civil rights activist
- Joanne Bland – civil rights movement activist
- J.L. Chestnut – author, attorney, and a figure in the U.S. civil rights movement
- Annie Lee Cooper – long-time civil rights activist who was active in the 1965 Selma voting rights movement
- Willis Nathaniel Huggins – historian and social activist
- Frederick D. Reese – voting rights movement leader
- Amelia Boynton Robinson – voting rights movement leader and long-time civic activist in Selma

== Art ==
- Mary Morgan Keipp – noted figure in the art photography movement of the early 20th century
- Clara Weaver Parrish – artist
- Alison Elizabeth Taylor – artist

== Athletics ==
- Zinn Beck – former MLB infielder; managed the first Selma Cloverleafs from 1928 to 1930, winning the Southeastern League pennant in 1930
- Curtis Berry – former professional basketball player
- David Beverly – former Auburn University and NFL player
- Charles Davis – member of the Azerbaijan national basketball team
- Cid Edwards – former NFL player
- Mia Hamm – former professional soccer player
- Candy Harris – former MLB player for the Houston Astros
- Gunnar Henderson – MLB player for the Baltimore Orioles
- Michael Johnson – professional football player, NFL, Cincinnati Bengals
- James Ralph "Shug" Jordan – former head football coach of Auburn University
- Terry Leach – former professional baseball player MLB, baseball field at Bloch Park named for him
- Larry Marks – professional boxer
- William Clarence Matthews – former baseball player, lawyer, first head football coach for Tuskegee University and civil rights activist
- Pat McHugh – former professional football player for the Philadelphia Eagles
- Ben Obomanu – professional football player, NFL, New York Jets
- L. Vann Pettaway – men's basketball head coach of Alabama A&M from 1986 to 2011
- Ken Pettway – player of gridiron football
- Hosken Powell – former Major League Baseball right fielder
- Cal Ramsey – former NBA player
- Ed Steele – former professional baseball outfielder

== Business ==
- Olan Mills Sr. – photographer and founder of Olan Mills
- Richard Scrushy – founder of HealthSouth
- Craig Vetter – motorcycle designer
- Lulu White – brothel madam and procuress

== Education ==
- Bogart Leashore – social worker, sociologist, dean of Hunter College school of social work (1991–2003)
- Minnie Bruce Pratt – educator, activist, and essayist
- Frank Warner – folk song collector and former YMCA executive

== Fashion ==
- Eunice W. Johnson – founder and director of the Ebony Fashion Fair

== Government ==
- David Abner – former member of the Texas Legislature
- Ann Bedsole – member of both houses of the Alabama State Legislature 1979–1995 from Mobile, born in 1930 in Selma
- Jo Bonner – U.S. representative from 2003 to 2013
- Janice Bowling – member of the Tennessee Senate
- Jim Clark – Selma sheriff during the 1965 voting rights campaign
- George Henry Craig, former U.S. Congressman for the 4th District of Alabama
- William Benjamin Craig – U.S. representative from 1907 to 1911
- Suzan DelBene – U.S. representative for Washington's 1st congressional district
- Jeremiah Haralson – U.S. representative from 1875 to 1877
- Sam Hobbs – U.S. representative from 1935 to 1951
- Truman McGill Hobbs – United States federal judge
- Michael W. Jackson – district attorney
- Thomas S. Kenan – U.S. representative from 1805 to 1811
- William Rufus King – vice president of the United States, U.S. senator, minister to France
- William Lehman – U.S. representative from 1973 to 1993
- John Tyler Morgan – U.S. senator from 1877 to 1907, major general, CSA
- James Perkins, Jr. – first African American mayor of Selma
- Edmund Pettus – U.S. senator from 1897 to 1907, brigadier general, CSA
- Gaston A. Robbins, former U.S. Congressman for the 4th District of Alabama
- Jeff Sessions – United States senator
- Terri Sewell – 2010 Democratic representative for Alabama's 7th congressional district
- Charles M. Shelley, officer in the Confederate military and former U.S. Congressman for the 4th District of Alabama
- Benjamin S. Turner – first African American elected to U.S. Congress from Alabama (1871– Republican)
- Hattie Hooker Wilkins – first woman elected to the Alabama Legislature

== Literature ==
- Katharine Hopkins Chapman (1870/72/73-1930) – author and historian
- Sarah Johnson Cocke – writer and civic leader
- W. C. Morrow – writer
- William O. Walker – former editor of the Call and Post
- Sheyann Webb – writer
- Kathryn Tucker Windham – storyteller, author, photographer, and journalist

== Military ==
- Howard W. Gilmore – World War II submarine commander who posthumously received the Medal of Honor
- William J. Hardee – lieutenant general, CSA, author of Hardee's Military Tactics used by both Union and Confederate troops
- Catesby ap Roger Jones – naval commander, captain of the ironclad ship CSS Virginia in its battle with the USS Monitor during the first conflict between iron warships in world history
- John Melvin – first American naval officer to die in World War I

== Music ==
- Randall Atcheson – concert pianist
- Kenny Brown – blues slide guitarist
- Mattie Moss Clark – former gospel music singer, The Clark Sisters
- Jimmy Gresham – soul musician
- Asher HaVon – winner of NBC's The Voice
- Johnny Moore – lead singer for The Drifters
- Bill Moss – gospel music singer
- Oscar Toney, Jr. – soul singer

== Parapsychology ==
- Edgar Cayce – famed psychic

== Religion ==
- Moses Anderson – Roman Catholic bishop
- T. J. Jemison – president of the National Baptist Convention, USA, Inc. from 1982 to 1994
- Lippman Mayer – rabbi
- Clarence Rufus J. Rivers – priest and composer of liturgical music
- Milton L. Wood – Bishop Suffragan in the Episcopal Diocese of Atlanta from 1967 to 1974

== Science ==
- Shwetak Patel – computer scientist and entrepreneur

== Television and film ==
- Gregg Hale – film producer
