= John Moutoussamy =

American architect (1922–1995)

- Born: January 5, 1922; Chicago, Illinois, US
- Died: 6 May 1995 (aged 73); Burnham, Illinois, US
- Education: Illinois Institute of Technology
- Occupation: Architect
- Spouse: Elizabeth Hunt
- Children: 3, including Jeanne Moutoussamy-Ashe
- Relatives: Arthur Ashe (son-in-law)

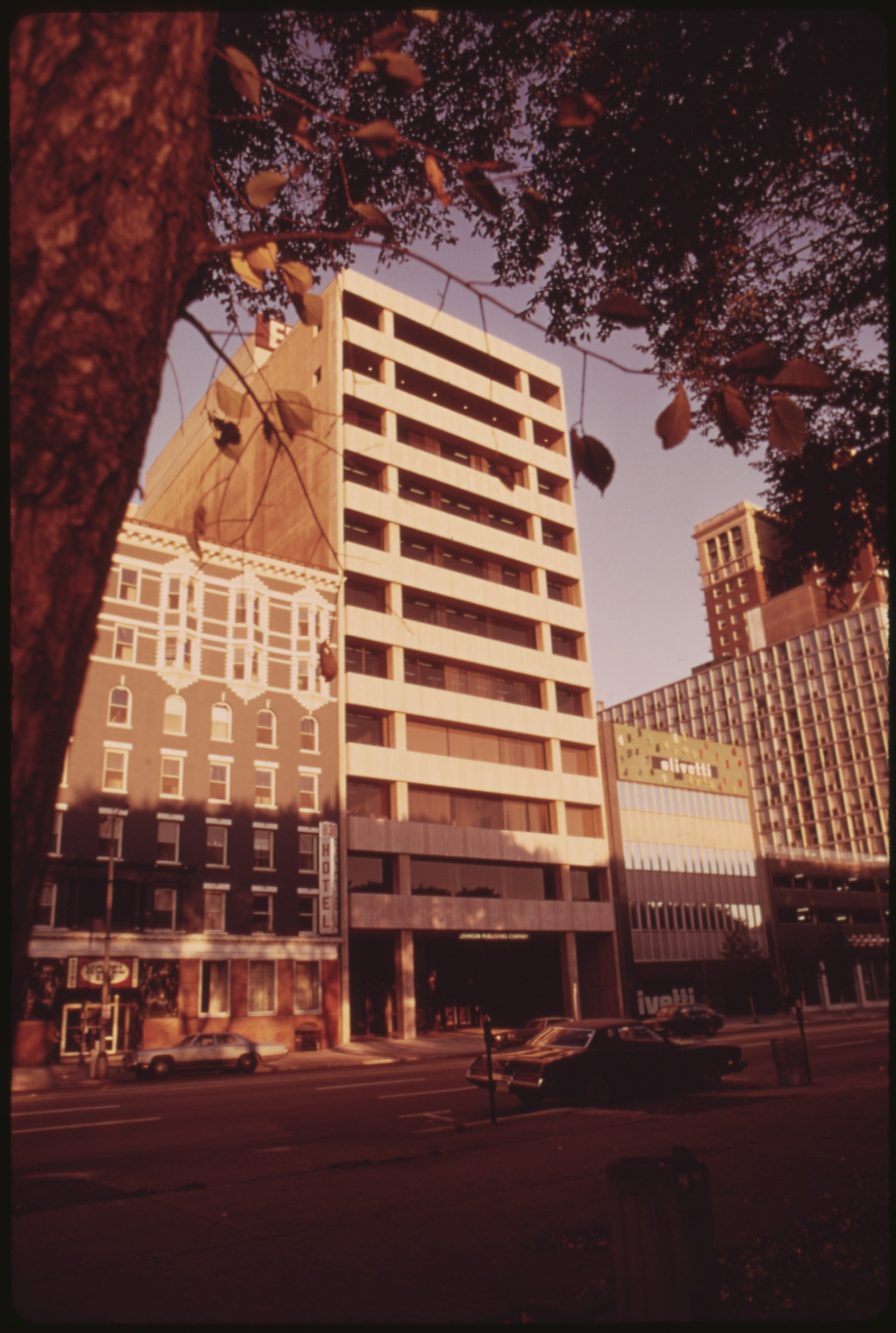
JPC headquarters at 820 S. Michigan Avenue in Chicago (designed by Moutoussamy), 1973

John Warren Moutoussamy (January 5, 1922 – May 6, 1995) was an American architect, best known for designing the headquarters building of the Johnson Publishing Company in downtown Chicago, Illinois. He was the first African-American architect to design a high-rise building in Chicago.

== Early life ==
He was born on January 5, 1922, in Chicago, Illinois, the son of Jean Marie Moutoussamy (born Guadeloupe, 1883-1941) and Julia Nettie Walker (born St James, Louisiana, 1894-1972).

Moutoussamy earned a degree from the Illinois Institute of Technology in 1948, where he studied under Mies van der Rohe. In his early career, he was mentored by architect Kenneth Roderick O'Neal.

== Career ==
Moutoussamy designed the 1971 headquarters building for the Johnson Publishing Company on Michigan Avenue in Chicago, which is still the only downtown Chicago high-rise building designed by an African-American. According to Architectural Digest, "Inside the stone-clad structure, colorful walls and psychedelic carpets exuded energy, celebrating black culture and commerce." In 2018, the building was given National Historic Landmark status. In 2019, the process of converting the building into apartments began, while retaining the signage for the magazines Ebony and Jet that were based there.

Moutoussamy designed other buildings in the Chicago area, including the Richard J. Daley College, Olive–Harvey College, Harry S. Truman College, the Chicago Urban League building, and the 36-story Regents Park twin towers in the Hyde Park area of Chicago.

He was the first African-American architect to have a partnership in a major practice, Dubin Dubin Black & Moutoussamy. He served on the board of trustees of Loyola University Chicago and the Art Institute of Chicago.

He designed a house for himself at 361 East 89th Place, just south of Chatham, Chicago.

== Personal life ==
Moutoussamy was married to Elizabeth Hunt (1922–2006), and they had three children, John Moutoussamy, Claude Moutoussamy and Jeanne Marie Moutoussamy-Ashe. Jeanne Moutoussamy-Ashe is a photographer, and was married to the tennis player Arthur Ashe from 1977 until his death in 1993.

He died in 1995, had a funeral Mass celebrated at St Thomas the Apostle Catholic Church, and was buried at St Mary's Cemetery, Chicago.
