= Oak Woods Cemetery =

Cemetery in Chicago, Illinois, US

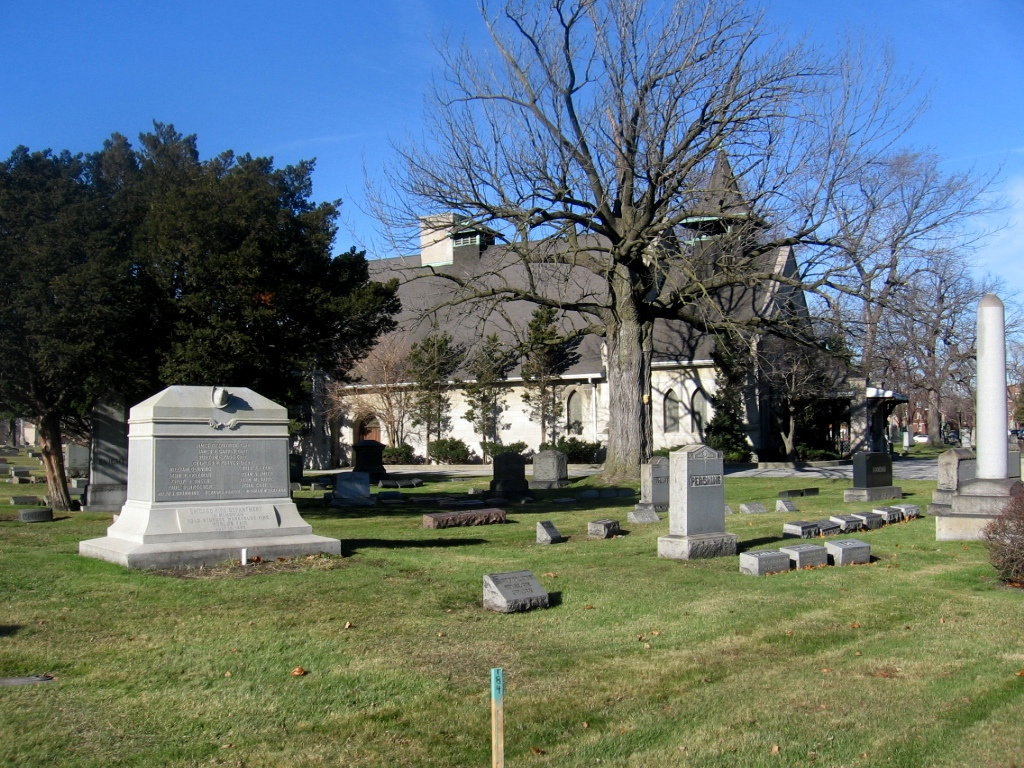
- Chapel and grounds at Oak Woods Cemetery
- Interactive map of Oak Woods Cemetery

Details
- Established: February 12, 1853
- Location: Chicago, Illinois
- Country: United States
- Coordinates: 41°46′12″N 87°36′00″W
- Owned by: Dignity Memorial
- No. of interments: >60,000
- Website: Oak Woods Cemetery
- Find a Grave: Oak Woods Cemetery

Oak Woods Cemetery is a large lawn cemetery in Chicago, Illinois, United States. Located at 1035 E. 67th Street, it is in the Greater Grand Crossing area of Chicago's South Side. Established 173 years ago on February 12, 1853, it covers 183 acres (74 ha).

Oak Woods is the final resting place of several famous Americans including Harold Washington, Jesse Jackson, Ida B. Wells, Jesse Owens, Cap Anson, and Enrico Fermi. It is also the setting for a Civil War mass grave and memorial for Confederate prisoners of war from Camp Douglas, called the Confederate Mound.

== History ==
Oak Woods Cemetery was chartered on February 12, 1853. It was designed by landscape architect Adolph Strauch who created a "landscape-lawn cemetery" on the 183 acres emphasizing grade changes with curving streets and well-planned drainage creating a uniform composition which was free of fences. The first burials took place in 1860.

After the American Civil War (1861–1865), several thousand Confederate soldiers, prisoners who died at Camp Douglas, were reburied here. According to a plaque on the site, soldiers were buried in "concentric trenches". A monument and marker, which former Kentucky lieutenant governor John C. Underwood helped construct, probably inflates the number of soldiers buried as 6,000, but lists the names of more than 4,000. Another, smaller memorial commemorates the Union soldiers who died at Camp Douglas, often from contagious diseases. The bodies from Camp Douglas had originally been buried at Camp Douglas and the City Cemetery, which was closed and removed during expansion of Lincoln Park and urban renewal following the Great Chicago Fire of 1871. The bodies were exhumed and re-interred together in a mass grave, which came to be known as Confederate Mound, reputedly the largest documented mass grave in the Western Hemisphere.

In response to the establishment of the Confederate memorial, in 1896, Thomas D. Lowther, a pre-war resident of the South, erected near it an abolitionist monument. The abolition monument is a large black marble cenotaph to pre-war southerners, "unknown heroric men", "martyrs" who had opposed slavery and disunion. Near the beginning of the war, Lowther had been forced to flee his home in Florida because of his anti-slavery and pro-Union stance.

In September 1963, Oak Woods ended their racial segregation policy following protests.

The cemetery contains the graves of many prominent African Americans, including Chicago's first African-American mayor, Harold Washington. Journalist and anti-lynching activist Ida B. Wells, Olympic sports hero Jesse Owens, business and publishing magnate John H. Johnson, Gospel music pioneer Thomas A. Dorsey and Gospel music star Albertina Walker are also buried in the cemetery.

Famous nuclear physicist Enrico Fermi has his final resting place here, as do several other faculty members of the University of Chicago. The cemetery also has a section for U.S. veterans of several wars, and a separately-maintained Jewish section.

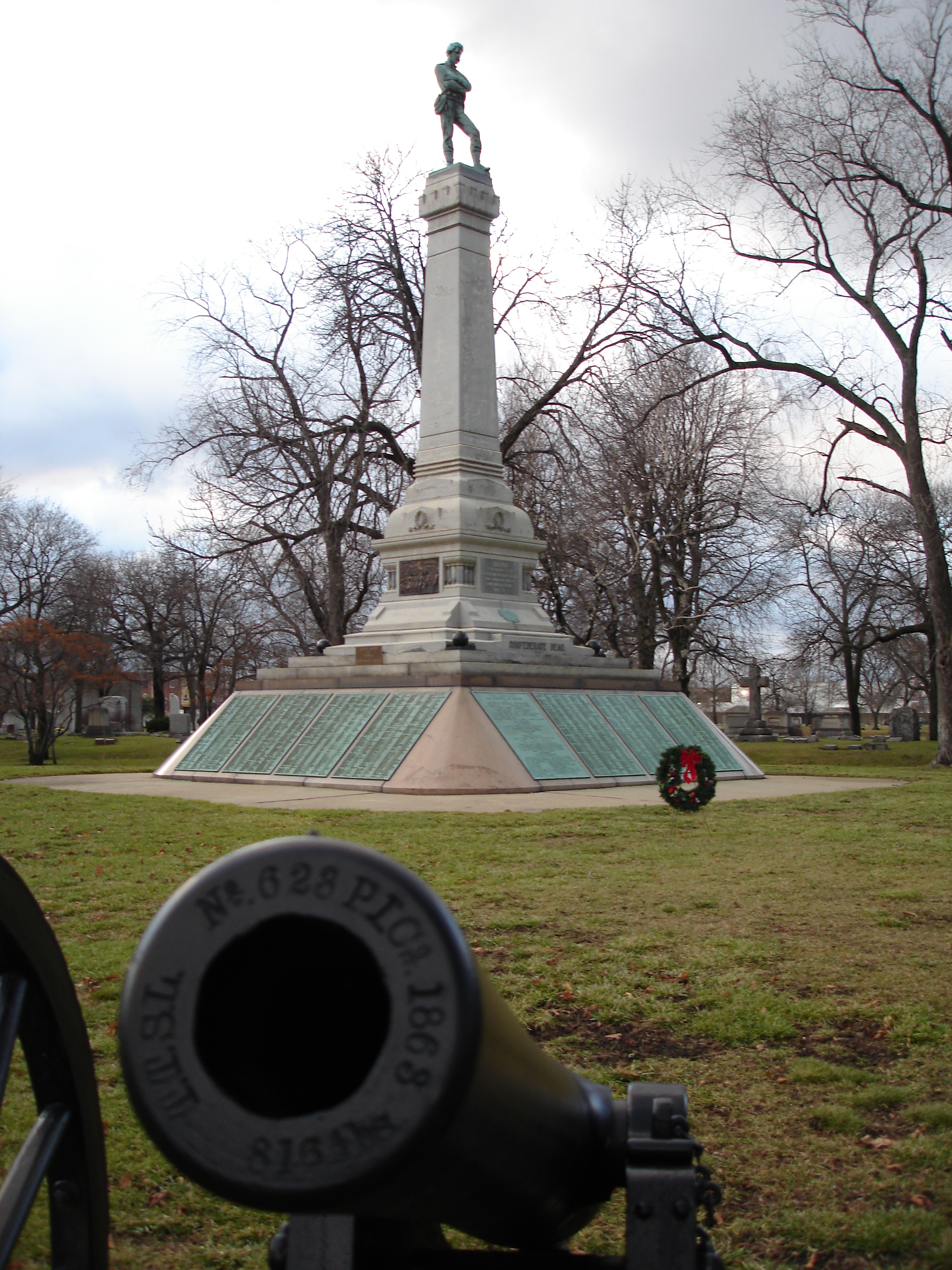
Confederate Mound

== Notable burials ==
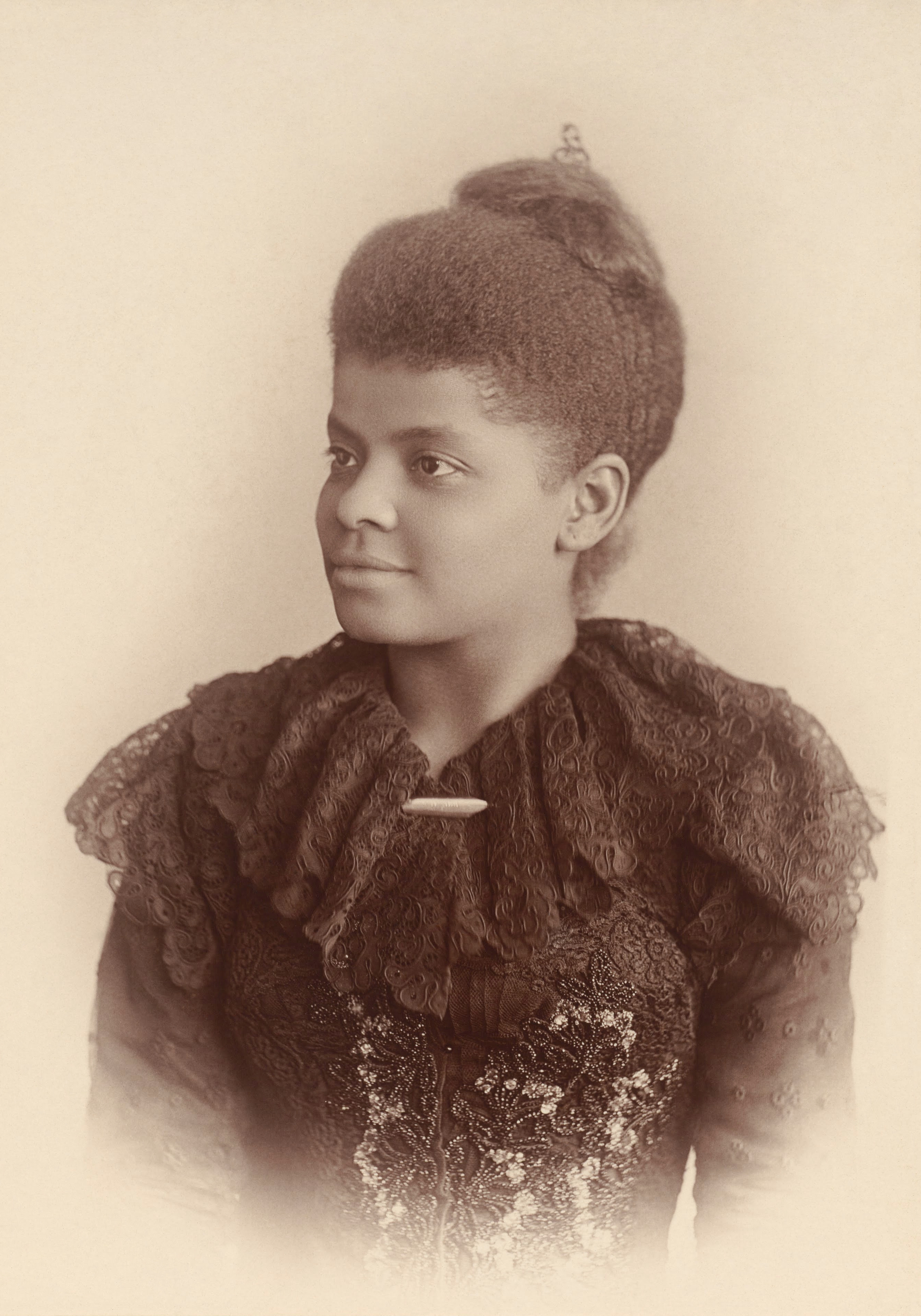
Ida B. Wells Barnett

In 2022, the Hyde Park Historical Society created an interactive directory application for monuments at the cemetery.

- Donald N. Aldrich (1917–1947), naval aviator and ace
- Dorothy Hansine Andersen (1901–1963) physician, medical researcher who identified cystic fibrosis
- Cap Anson (1852–1922), Major League Baseball Hall of Fame
- Frank Bacon (1864–1922), actor and playwright
- Ferdinand Lee Barnett (1852–1936), lawyer and civil rights activist. Spouse of Ida B. Wells.
- Adolphus C. Bartlett (1844–1922), businessman, philanthropist
- Gary Becker (1930–2014), economist, Nobel Prize winner
- Arthur M. Brazier (1921–2010), activist, pastor
- Woodnut S. Burr (1861–1952), ardent worker for women's suffrage in the United States
- Frank Butler (1872–1899), pitcher and outfielder in pre-Negro leagues baseball
- Otis Clay (1942–2016), blues and soul singer
- Clarence H. Cobbs (1908–1979), founder of the First Church of Deliverance
- James "Big Jim" Colosimo (1878–1920), boss of the Chicago Outfit
- Henry Chandler Cowles (1869–1939), professor of botany at University of Chicago, pioneer American ecologist, conservationist
- William Craig (1855–1902), first Secret Service agent to die on duty
- Charles S. Deneen (1863–1940), 23rd Governor of Illinois
- Thomas A. Dorsey (1899–1993), composer, the "father of Gospel music"
- Walter Eckersall (1886–1930), all-American quarterback and sportswriter
- Mircea Eliade (1907–1986), Romanian historian of religion, fiction writer, philosopher, and professor at the University of Chicago
- Khadijah Farrakhan (1935–2026), political activist, spouse of Nation of Islam leader Louis Farrakhan.
- Enrico Fermi (1901–1954), physicist, Nobel Prize winner, creator of the first nuclear reactor
- Henry Blake Fuller (1857–1929), writer, author of early work in gay literature, Bertram Cope's Year
- Norman Golb (1928–2020), historian
- Nancy Green (1834–1923), storyteller, cook, activist, and the first woman to portray Aunt Jemima
- Jake Guzik (1886–1956), gangster and bookkeeper for Al Capone; aka "Greasy Thumb"
- John Marshall Hamilton (1847–1905), 18th Governor of Illinois
- William Draper Harkins (1873–1951), nuclear chemist
- Monroe Heath (1827–1894), mayor of Chicago
- Jesse Jackson (1941–2026), minister and activist, candidate for US president
- John Christen Johansen (1876–1964), portraitist and landscape painter
- Charles Johnson (1909–2006), pitcher and outfielder for the Chicago American Giants of the Negro leagues
- Eunice W. Johnson (1916–2010), business magnate and spouse of John H. Johnson
- John H. Johnson (1918–2005), founder and publisher of Ebony and Jet magazines, spouse of Eunice W. Johnson
- Kenesaw Mountain Landis (1866–1944), Hall of Fame, First Commissioner of Baseball
- Richard Loeb (1905–1936), crime figure – cremated here, ashes returned to family
- James Robert Mann (1856–1922), Republican U.S. Representative from Illinois who first proposed a resolution to approve the 19th Amendment (Women’s Suffrage).
- Alexander Alexandrowitsch Maximow (1874–1928), Russian-American physician-scientist, pathologist, histologist
- Little Brother Montgomery (1906–1985), blues piano player and singer
- S. Grace Nicholes (1870–1922), social reformer
- Jesse Owens (1913–1980), Olympic track and field champion
- Fred Rice Jr. (1926–2011), first African-American Superintendent of the Chicago Police Department
- Eugene Sawyer (1934–2008), second African-American Mayor of Chicago (1987–1989)
- J. Young Scammon (1812–1890), attorney, banker, newspaper publisher
- Maud Slye (1879–1954), University of Chicago pathologist
- Albreta Moore Smith (c. 1875–1957) American writer, clubwoman
- Roebuck "Pops" Staples (1915–2000), Gospel singer
- Willie Stokes (1937–1986), Chicago mobster
- William Hale Thompson (1869–1944), mayor of Chicago
- June Travis (1914–2008), film actress
- Herbert J. Tweedie (1864–1906), golf course architect
- Bill Veeck (1914–1986), Major League Baseball owner – cremated here, ashes returned to family
- Victims of the Iroquois Theatre Fire (1903)
- Victims of the Eastland Disaster (1915)
- Albertina Walker (1929–2010), singer, songwriter, "Queen of Gospel"
- Harold Washington (1922–1987), lawyer, politician, first African American Mayor of Chicago
- Ida B. Wells (1862–1931), social reformer, civil rights activist. Spouse of Ferdinand Lee Barnett.
- Junior Wells (1934–1998), blues musician
- Ben Wilson (1967–1984), Chicago Simeon H.S., 1984–85 #1 ranked high school basketball player in America
- James Hutchinson Woodworth (1804–1869), Mayor of Chicago
- Otto Young (1844–1907), "Merchant Millionaire" of Chicago and Lake Geneva, Wisconsin

== See also ==
- List of cemeteries in Cook County, Illinois
- List of mausoleums
