= Bryan Berteaux =

African-American news photographer (194–2020)

Bryan Stephen Berteaux Sr.
- Born: April 11, 1945; New Orleans, Louisiana, U.S.
- Died: April 17, 2020 (aged 75)
- Education: Delgado Trades and Technical Institute
- Alma mater: Tulane University
- Occupation: News photographer
- Awards: New Orleans Press Club President's Award, Louisiana Better Newspaper Awards

Bryan Stephen Berteaux Sr. (April 11, 1945 – April 17, 2020) was an African-American news photographer. He worked as a combat photographer for the United States Army and later as a photographer for The Times-Picayune.

== Biography ==
Berteaux was born in New Orleans, Louisiana, in 1945. He received an associate degree from Delgado Community College and studied photography at Tulane University.

In 1965, Berteaux was drafted into the United States Army and served for two years in Vietnam. In the 1970s, he began working at The Times-Picayune as a staff photographer. Berteaux photographed several celebrities, including Muhammad Ali, Jane Fonda, Jesse Jackson. He worked for the Johnson Publishing Company and his photographs were published in EBONY magazine.

He received national and international honors for his aerial, feature, and news photography, including the New Orleans Press Club President's Award, Louisiana Better Newspaper Awards, and the Associated Press and United Press International Awards.

Berteaux retired in 2007. In 2019, his photographs were exhibited at the Goodwood Library in Baton Rouge, Louisiana.
