= Jeanne Moutoussamy-Ashe =

American photographer and activist

- Born: Jeanne Moutoussamy; July 9, 1951 (age 75); Chicago, Illinois, U.S.
- Education: Cooper Union School of Art
- Occupations: Photographer, activist, educator
- Spouse: Arthur Ashe (m. 1977; died 1993)
- Children: 1 daughter
- Parent: John Moutoussamy
- Website: jeannemoutoussamy-ashe.com

Jeanne Moutoussamy-Ashe (born July 9, 1951) is an American photographer and activist. She is best known for her work in magazines, newspapers, and several photography books, and also as an AIDS activist.

== Early life and education ==
Moutoussamy-Ashe was born in Chicago, Illinois, on July 9, 1951. Her mother's family was from Arkansas, and her father's family came from New Orleans and Guadeloupe. Both parents were professionals in art-related fields. Her mother, Elizabeth Rose Hunt Moutoussamy, was an interior designer, and her father, John Warren Moutoussamy, was an architect. They encouraged her to pursue her own artistic interests by enrolling her in weekend classes at the Art Institute of Chicago when she was eight years old. When she was 18, family friend Frank Stewart introduced her to photography. After her application to the Cooper Union School of Art was rejected, she studied with Garry Winogrand for a summer and then reapplied. Moutoussamy-Ashe went on to earn her BFA from the Cooper Union in 1975. Before graduating, she spent her junior year in West Africa to complete independent study in photography.

== Career ==
After graduating, Moutoussamy-Ashe worked as a graphic artist and in television photojournalism for WNBC and WNEW in New York, and also for PM Magazine. Her friend, Gordon Parks suggested that she obtain credentials to photograph the 1968 United Negro College Fund Tennis Tournament organized by tennis champion Arthur Ashe.

Over the course of her career, Moutoussamy-Ashe has contributed photographs to many magazines and newspapers, including Life, Smithsonian, Sports Illustrated, People Weekly, Ebony, Black Enterprise, World Tennis, Self, and Essence.

== Personal life ==
Moutoussamy-Ashe married Arthur Ashe in 1977. In December 1986, Ashe and Moutoussamy-Ashe adopted a daughter, whom they named Camera after Moutoussamy-Ashe's profession. Nineteen months later, Arthur was diagnosed as HIV positive, after contracting the disease via a blood transfusion he received during heart bypass surgery, and eventually dying from AIDS-related pneumonia in February 1993.

== Recognition ==
Moutoussamy-Ashe has participated in a number of individual and group exhibits in cities around the United States and Europe. Her work is included in the permanent collections of several museums, including the Museum of Modern Art in New York, the Smithsonian National Museum of African American History and Culture, the National Gallery of Art, the Philadelphia Museum of Art, and the Whitney Museum of American Art. It is also in private collections, including Oprah Winfrey's. She has received a number of awards, including the Essence Photography Literary Award (2008), and a Mayoral Citation from the City of Chicago (1986). She also holds two honorary Doctor of Fine Arts degrees, from Queens College (2002, Charlotte, North Carolina) and Long Island University (C.W. Post Campus, 1990).

Moutoussamy-Ashe's work was included in the 2025 exhibition Photography and the Black Arts Movement, 1955–1985 at the National Gallery of Art.

== Publications ==
=== Books ===
- 1982: Daufuskie Island, a Photographic Essay. Columbia, SC: University of South Carolina Press.
- 1993: Daddy and Me: A Photo Story of Arthur Ashe and His Daughter, Camera. New York: A.A. Knopf: Distributed by Random House, Inc.
- 1993: Viewfinders: Black Women Photographers. New York; London: Writers & Readers.
- 2001: The African Flower. New York, N.Y.: Jeanne Moutoussamy-Ashe.
- 2011: Arthur Ashe: Out of the Shadow. New York, NY: Arthur Ashe Learning Center.
- 2007: Intimate Portraits: Jeanne Moutoussamy-Ashe. New York: Bill Hodges Gallery.
