= Eunice W. Johnson =

American businesswoman (1916–2010)

- Johnson photographed in her office at Johnson Publishing Company in Chicago, circa 1975
- Born: Eunice Walker; April 4, 1916; Selma, Alabama, U.S.
- Died: January 3, 2010 (aged 93); Chicago, Illinois, U.S.
- Resting place: Oak Woods Cemetery (Chicago, Illinois)
- Education: B.A. Talladega College; Loyola University Chicago
- Occupations: Businesswoman; company executive
- Years active: 1942–2008
- Notable credits: The Negro Digest; Ebony; Jet; Ebony Fashion Fair
- Title: Founder and director of the Ebony Fashion Fair
- Spouse: John H. Johnson (m. 1941; died 2005)
- Children: 2

Eunice Walker Johnson (April 4, 1916 – January 3, 2010) was an American businesswoman. Johnson was the wife of publisher John H. Johnson and an executive at Johnson Publishing Company. Johnson was the founder and director of the Ebony Fashion Fair, which began in 1958 as a hospital fundraiser and became an annual worldwide fashion tour that highlighted fashion for African-American women, running until a year before her death.

== Early life and education ==
Eunice Walker was born on April 4, 1916, in Selma, Alabama, to Nathaniel Walker, a physician, and Ethel Walker (née McAlpine), a high school principal. She was one of four children. She graduated with a degree in sociology from Talladega College in 1938. During college, Johnson joined Delta Sigma Theta. Johnson met her future husband, John H. Johnson, in 1940 while she was attending Loyola University Chicago and was married after she earned her master's degree the following year.

== Career ==
=== Johnson Publishing Company ===
Together with her husband, she established The Negro Digest in 1942, a magazine styled after Reader's Digest. The rapid growth of their first publication encouraged them to create Ebony, a monthly designed to emulate Life and its style of boldly-photographed front covers. Johnson was the one who suggested that the magazine be named for the dark wood. By the time of her death, Ebony reached a readership of 1.25 million, and its weekly companion Jet reached a circulation of 900,000. She was a great influence to a lot of African Americans.

=== Ebony Fashion Fair & Cosmetics ===
Johnson began the Ebony Fashion Tour (which later became known as Ebony Fashion Fair) as a fundraiser in 1958 for a hospital in New Orleans. In its half century of existence, the tour visited 200 cities across the United States, Canada and the Caribbean, raising over $50 million for charity. The fashion tour was a pioneer in using African-American models on the runway and helped highlight the works of African-American designers. Building on her difficulties in finding cosmetics suited to the skin tones of her models, Johnson created Fashion Fair Cosmetics in 1973 as a line of makeup that would be sold in leading department stores.

== Death, family and legacy ==
Johnson mausoleum at Oak Woods Cemetery

Johnson died of renal failure January 3, 2010, at the age of 93 at her home in Chicago. She was buried with her husband in a private family mausoleum at Oak Woods Cemetery, in the Greater Grand Crossing neighborhood of Chicago's South Side. She was survived by her daughter Linda Johnson-Rice, chairwoman and chief executive of Johnson Publishing, as well as by a granddaughter. Her son, John H. Johnson Jr., died in December 1981 after a long battle with an illness related to sickle cell at age 25.

In 2010, the Noble Network of Charter Schools and Chicago Public Schools opened Johnson College Prep High School, a public charter high school in Chicago's Englewood neighborhood, in honor of Johnson and her husband John H. Johnson.
