= The Secret of Selling the Negro =

1954 film

The Secret of Selling the Negro is a 1954 film financed by Johnson Publishing Company, the publisher of Ebony magazine, to encourage advertisers to promote their products and services in the African-American media.

== Summary ==
The film showed African-American professionals, housewives and students as participants in the American consumer society, and it emphasized the economic power of this demographic community.

== Production ==
The film, which was shot in Kodachrome Color, featured appearances by Sinclair Weeks, Secretary of the U.S. Department of Commerce, and radio announcer Robert Trout. The film had its premiere in July 1954 at the Joseph Schlitz Brewing Company in Milwaukee, Wisconsin, and was shown on a non-theatrical basis.
