= Kenneth Roderick O'Neal =

American architect (1908–1989)

- Born: July 30, 1908; Union, Missouri, U.S.
- Died: March 17, 1989 (aged 80); Honolulu, Oahu, Hawaii, U.S.
- Other names: K. Roderick O'Neal, Kenneth R. O'Neal
- Education: University of Iowa, Armour Institute
- Occupations: Architect, engineer, painter

Kenneth Roderick O'Neal (1908–1989), was an American architect, engineer, and painter. He founded the first Black-owned and led architecture firm in downtown Chicago. O'Neal was an artist of the Harlem Renaissance, who later studied under former Bauhaus instructors and colleagues of Ludwig Mies van der Rohe, and employed early career architects including Beverly Lorraine Greene, John Moutoussamy, and Georgia Louise Harris Brown.

== Early life and education ==
Kenneth Roderick O'Neal was born on July 30, 1908, in Union, Franklin County, Missouri. He attended Sumner High School in St. Louis, Missouri.

O'Neal graduated from the University of Iowa with a B.A. degree (1931) in graphic art. At the onset of the Great Depression, O'Neal remained at the University of Iowa to pursue a B.S. degree (1935) in civil engineering. During this time, O'Neal submitted one of his paintings to the Harmon Foundation in New York City, to be included in their exhibition of Work by Negro Artists (1933).

Following his graduation from Iowa, he moved to Chicago in 1936 to work as an engineer for the Illinois Highway Dept. A couple of years later, O'Neal attended the Armour Institute (now Illinois Institute of Technology) and enrolled in classes on modernist architecture in conjunction with the Institute of Design, and studied under former Bauhaus instructors exiled from Nazi Germany, including Ludwig Hilberseimer, and other colleagues to Ludwig Mies van der Rohe.

== Career ==
In 1940 to 1941, O'Neal worked evenings as a draftsman for Walter T. Bailey, Illinois' first African American licensed architect.

In June 1940, O'Neal became licensed as an architect in Illinois. He opened the first Black-led architecture firm in downtown Chicago. Beverly Lorraine Greene, the first African American woman in the United States to become licensed as an architect, briefly worked for O'Neal. Georgia Louise Harris Brown, the second African American woman in the country to become a licensed architect, also worked at the firm of O'Neal from 1945 to 1949. Architect, John Moutoussamy also employed by O'Neal, worked evenings at the firm while attending ITT.

Partly during, 1943 to 1945, O'Neal served as a second class technical sergeant in the United States Army during World War II in the European theater. While abroad, attended the University of Liverpool in England, enrolled in architectural history classes.

In November 1947, O'Neal procured a certificate to conduct or transact business in Chicago. as the Architectural Drafting Bureau located at 35 S. Dearborn St. in effect, becoming the first African American architect to own an architectural firm practicing in downtown Chicago. The Architectural Drafting Bureau provided drafting services for other architects and engineers, and provided conventional architectural services on their own commissions.

O'Neal published two design books: "A Portfolio of Modern Homes" (1949), and "A Volume of Contemporary Homes" (1980).

ONeal maintained an architectural firm, K. Roderick O'Neal and Associates, as a physical office from the late 1940's to 1958, when he accepted a position as architect for the City of Chicago, Department of Public Works, Bureau of Architecture. While with the city, he still provided architectural services working from a home office.

He retired from the city in 1983. O'Neal married three times. He and his third wife, Margaret moved briefly to Tucson, Arizona, followed by a move to Honolulu, Hawaii. O'Neal received reciprocity to practice architecture in Hawaii where he practice up to his death at age 80 on March 17, 1989, in Honolulu.

== Work ==
- Lawrence E. Smith residence (1964), 8348 South Calumet, Chicago, Illinois

== Publications ==
- O'Neal, K. Roderick (1949). A Portfolio of Modern Homes. Architectural Drafting Bureau.
- O'Neal, Kenneth R. (1980). A Volume of Contemporary Homes. Ork Enterprises.

== See also ==
- African-American architects
