= Gallery Int Fashion Fair =

Gallery Int Fashion Fair CPH
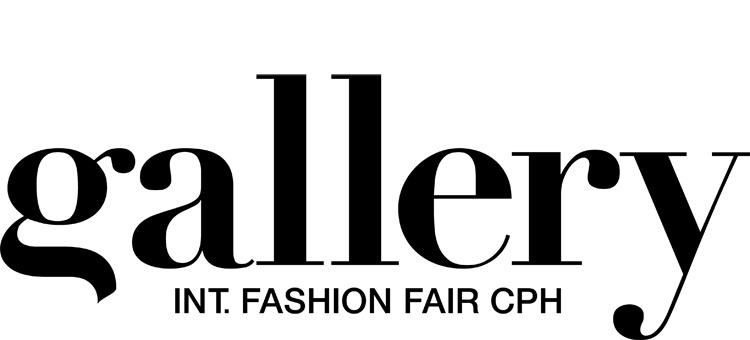
- Company type: Public company
- Industry: Fashion
- Founded: Denmark, Copenhagen (2005)
- Headquarters: Copenhagen
- Key people: Founder: Christian Gregersen
- Products: Clothing
- Website: www.gallery.dk

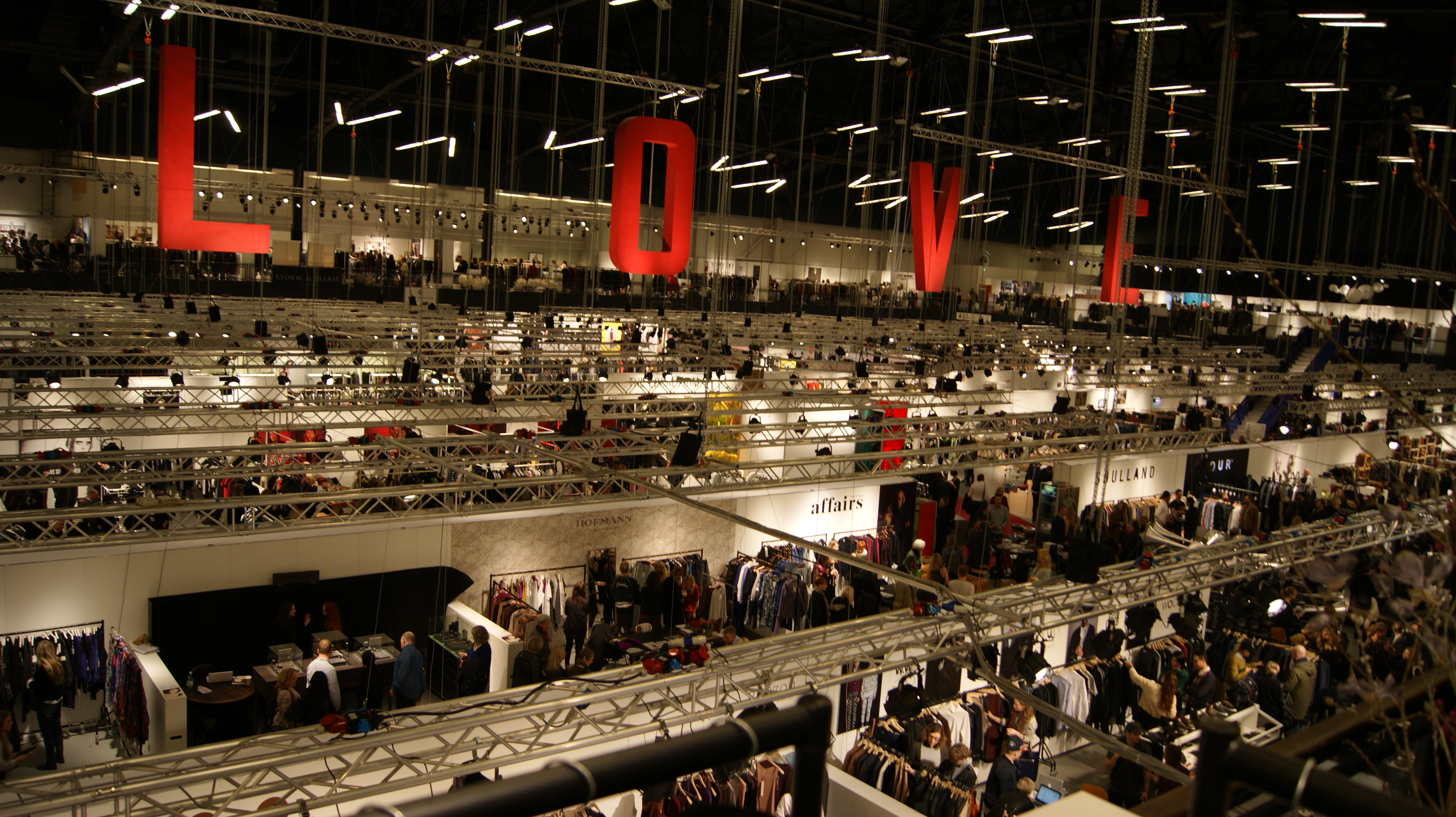

Gallery Int Fashion Fair is a trade fair held twice a year during Copenhagen Fashion Week, in August and February.

== History ==
Christian Gregersen is the founder and owner of Gallery Int Fashion Fair. He is also the co-organizer of Copenhagen Fashion Week and the owner of Gregersen Communication (founded in 1999).

== Description ==
Gergersen founded Gallery Int Fashion Fair in 2005 as a small showroom. By 2008, it had grown into a full sized fair with 350 leading brands.

Currently, the fair represents more than 150 leading, design driven fashion brands from Scandinavia and 200 design driven brands from around the world. Gallery has also one of Europe's biggest show scenes with more than 20 catwalks shows each year and has had 120 shows within the last 6 years. Among the shows are Marimekko, Jill Sander, Cheap Monday, Vivienne Westwood, Henrik Vibskov, and Peter Jensen. Among the exhibitors are Wood Wood, Tiger of Sweden, Kitsune, Altewai.samoe, Carin Wester, Veronica B. Vallnes, Tabernacle Twins, Foreign Affairs, Soulland, Norse Project, Sand and Day.

== See also ==
- Ebony Fashion Fair
- Fashion Fair
