= Frank Butler (pitcher) =

American baseball player

- Pitcher / Outfielder
- Born: 1871 or 1872; Nashville, Tennessee
- Died: September 24, 1899; Chicago, Illinois
- Batted: Unknown Threw: Unknown

debut
- 1894, for the Chicago Unions

Last appearance
- 1895, for the Chicago Unions

Teams
- Chicago Unions (1894–1895)

Frank Butler (1871 or 1872 – September 24, 1899) was an American baseball pitcher and outfielder in the pre-Negro leagues.

Butler played for the Chicago Union Giants for at least two years, coming from the same area as team owners Frank Leland and W.S. Peters.

He died of tuberculosis at the age of 27 in Chicago, Illinois on September 24, 1899. He is buried at Oak Woods Cemetery in Chicago.
