= Lifetouch =

American photography company

Lifetouch Inc.
- Type: Subsidiary
- Industry: Professional Photography
- Founded: 1936; 90 years ago
- Founder: Bruce Reinecker and Eldon Rothgeb
- Headquarters: Eden Prairie, Minnesota, United States
- Key people: Ken Murphy, Group Chief Executive
- Parent: Shutterfly
- Website: lifetouch.com

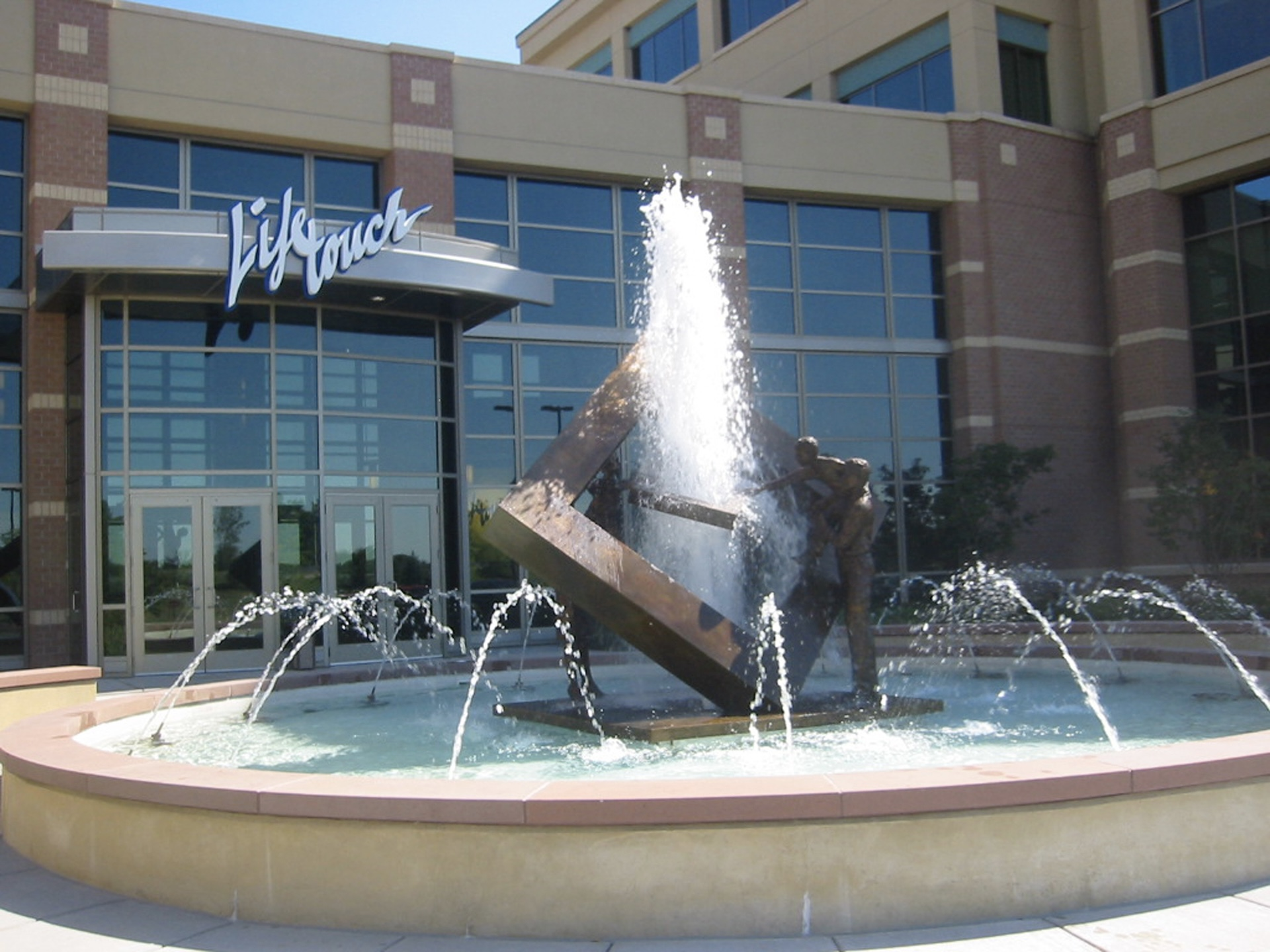
The sculpture, Generations, was created for the 70th anniversary of Lifetouch by sculptor Nicholas Legeros.

Lifetouch Inc. is an American-based photography company headquartered in Eden Prairie, Minnesota. Its Canadian operations is based in Winnipeg, Manitoba, and the company also has facilities in Nevada, Indiana, and Ohio.

It was founded as National School Studios (NSS) in 1936 by Eldon Rothgeb and R. Bruce Reinecker and incorporated in March 1948. A subsidiary of Redwood City, California-based Shutterfly Inc., the company provides photography for families, schools, and places of worship; has over 22,000 employees; and operates in all 50 states as well as in Canada. Through Lifetouch Media Productions, video support is provided to internal and external customers.

Company photography labs are located throughout the United States and Canada.

== Business units ==
Business units under the corporate umbrella include:

- Lifetouch National School Studios Inc. provides student photography from preschool to high school graduation, sports, prom and dance, and yearbooks.
- Lifetouch Preschool Portraits Inc. provides infant and toddler photography.
- Lifetouch Portrait Studios Inc. is represented in the retail market by some 800 photographic studios, including JCPenney Portraits, Cilento Photography, and Lifetouch Business Portraits.
- Lifetouch Services Inc. produces yearbooks and memory books.

Defunct business units:

- Lifetouch Church Directories and Portraits Inc. was an on-site family photography business for faith communities and other organizations, providing portraiture and printed directories.

== Company history ==
Former logo of Lifetouch from 1984 to 2017

=== Company beginnings, 1936–1949 ===
Two traveling salesmen, Eldon Rothgeb (1916–1972) and R. Bruce Reinecker (1910–1987), had worked together for a couple of years for a school photography studio in Kansas City, Missouri. In 1936, in the midst of the Great Depression, they raised $500 and initiated their plan to open their own school photography company, setting up business as National School Studios (NSS), "School Photography of Distinction", in Minneapolis, Minnesota. They chose the Upper Midwest to launch their business, a predominantly rural area with fewer professional photographers and thus potential for greater opportunity.

By 1939, the NSS had more than a dozen salesmen selling to schools—Reinecker in charge of production and Rothgeb supervising sales—and introduced its first new products, the 3x5 enlargement and 3x5 display folder, neither of which had ever been offered by a school photography company.

Unusually for the era, salesmen for NSS were paid employees of the company rather than independent contractors.

Following World War II in 1945, the founders mortgaged their personal property and stretched the company's credit line to offer approximately 80% of their salesmen (returning veterans) no-interest financing for cars and down payments to buy homes. This drove the company into the red and the bank canceled its line of credit. Nonetheless, by 1946, NSS was one of the largest school photography firms in the country.

That same year, NSS moved to a new plant in Minneapolis and began using the first continuous processing equipment in the industry, eliminating hand-processing. The system was adapted from the U.S. Government's "V-mail" system, which printed from a continuous roll of paper, and eliminated the slower single-cut sheets. The new equipment enabled them to add hand-tinted and sepia-tone prints to the product line, which stimulated sales. In 1948, 5x7 enlargements were introduced, the first in the market. By 1949, the sales force was at work in all 48 states.

=== Expansion and transition to employee stock ownership, 1950–1979 ===
In the early 1950s, Stanley Merz of the Photo Control Company in Minneapolis, began development of the National School Studios' Model 10 camera, and in 1952, NSS opened its first plant outside of Minneapolis in Winnipeg, Manitoba, Canada. During that same year, Eastman Kodak developed a new negative process and new photographic paper that streamlined color photo development. With the help of Kodak, NSS developed the school photography industry's first cluster lens printer, making it possible to print multiple photos from a single exposure. NSS was the first to offer full-color (hand-colored) school photos starting in 1956. Package printing and the Model 10 camera, a replacement for the original box camera, were introduced in 1957, the chief advantage of which was a separate film magazine, better lighting control, and better film metering. The company's first color print processor was installed in 1958.

During the next decade, the Model 10 evolved into the Photo Control Model 5 camera, which remained the industry standard for the next 20 years.

By the 1960s, the National School Studios' markets had expanded to include all 50 states, Puerto Rico, and Canada. New offices and production facilities were built in Bloomington, Minnesota, in 1968. That same year, the 8x10 school portrait was introduced to the school photography market, becoming vital to NSS' success in the late 1960s and early 1970s.

Upon the sudden death of founder Eldon Rothgeb in 1972, Richard P. Erickson, a NSS territory manager, was named vice president of sales and marketing to develop plans for consistent growth and profitability. Erickson integrated the company's first two acquisition in 1973 and 1974, respectively—Universal Publications, based in Kansas City, Missouri, a company specializing in school yearbooks; and Prestige Portraits, based in Muncie, Indiana, specializing in senior portraiture. NSS also released "Select-A-Pack" in 1974, offering a choice of three different school photo packages rather than one.

Erickson was appointed executive vice president in 1976 when Reinecker transitioned to become less active in day-to-day company operations. Paul Harmel, who joined NSS in 1977 as controller, introduced long-range financial plans that moved the company forward, further propelled by Reinecker's decision to reward his employees with an Employee Stock Ownership Trust (ESOT), in 1977. The ESOT was unusual in that it gave employees 100% ownership of the company and transferred ownership without requiring contributions from individual employees.

=== Rebranding to "Lifetouch", 1980–1989 ===
The National School Studios introduced a prototype of its Micro-Z camera at the July 1980 sales meeting, a system that Richard Erickson had brainstormed with the company's chief design engineer, Tal Hopson, for handling NSS' information and sales volume. Despite innovations, photographers were reluctant to accept it after using the Model 5 for 15 years. Redesigned four times in five years, Erickson was committed to making the camera work. The major advantage was that data could be applied to negatives in barcode, which Micro-Z printers recognized, automatically printing the correct photo package. It became the camera of choice in 1982. A key component of the company's success was its ongoing dedication to the design and construction of its own cameras.

Erickson was named president of NSS in November 1980. As part of a new corporate development program, Kinderfoto International, a studio photography company, was acquired in 1983, which pushed NSS into retail marketing and promotion.

On August 1, 1984, Erickson announced a new name for the corporation—Lifetouch—saying that the new logo in script "looks like we're signing our work." Business units, each with separate identities, were rebranded: NSS became Lifetouch National School Studios; Kinderfoto became Lifetouch Portrait Studios; Prestige Portraits became Lifetouch Senior Portraits (now Prestige Portraits); and Universal Publications became Lifetouch Publishing (now Lifetouch Services).

In 1986, Lifetouch celebrated its 50th anniversary with sales of nearly 200 million photos annually. Richard Erickson became chairman of the board and CEO of Lifetouch and Paul Harmel was named executive vice president and chief operating officer of Lifetouch National School Studios in 1987.

The late 1980s were marked by numerous acquisitions for Lifetouch: National Video Recollections of St. Paul, Minnesota, was purchased in 1988; followed by Enterprise School Photos, Inc., a school picture and yearbook vendor in Tulsa, Oklahoma, in 1989. Lifetouch then initiated acquisition of School Pictures Inc. and Portrait World.

=== Acquisitions and expansion, 1990–1999 ===
Next in line was Max Ward-Delmar, the leading supplier on the East Coast of undergraduate and senior portrait services, which was purchased in 1990, giving Lifetouch an office and lab in Chesapeake, Virginia. Portrait Industries Corporation, a division of Max Ward-Delmar, gave Lifetouch a stronger presence in the preschool photography market. Portrait Industries, Inc. a company based in Mobile, Alabama, that specialized in preschool photography with national accounts such as Kindercare, La Petite, and Childtime, was acquired in the 1990s.

In May 1995, United Photographic Industries, a church directory and commercial printing business in Galion, Ohio, was purchased. The following year, Lifetouch celebrated its 60th anniversary and broke ground for Phase I of a new Lifetouch corporate campus in Eden Prairie, Minnesota. Phase II was completed in 2004.

Olan Mills' school division, based in Chattanooga, Tennessee, was acquired in 1999, as was a major competitor in school photography, T.D. Brown, of Cranston, Rhode Island, which had been in business since 1929. The Richard P. Erickson Scholarship was initiated in 1998 to honor Erickson's decades of service to the company and to benefit the children and grandchildren of Lifetouch employees.

=== 2000s–present ===
Flash Digital Portraits became a branded retail concept in 2000, but was eventually discontinued.

In 2006, Lifetouch purchased the photography business of Jostens, and in 2011, the photography division of Herff Jones.

In December 2010, the Smithsonian's National Museum of American History received a donation of historic materials from Lifetouch as part of its effort to record the history of photography. The donation included two cameras, a Micro-Z and a TruView, patent drawings and interview with the inventors that complement the museum's collection of some 15,000 pieces of photographic apparatus and more than 200,000 photographs. A Micro-Z and TruView camera were also placed in the collection of the International Museum of Photography in Rochester, New York, and in the collection of the Minnesota History Center in Saint Paul, Minnesota.

On November 9, 2011, Lifetouch Inc. announced that it had purchased the remaining assets of Olan Mills Photography, which included both its church directory and retail studio businesses. In 2013, Lifetouch purchased many of the assets of shuttered competitor CPI Corp., who had operated retail portrait studios in Sears and Walmart stores. These assets included the brand PictureME, which has been relaunched as a chroma key-based background replacement family photography concept in some of its retail locations.

In 2012, Lifetouch patented a new school portrait camera technology called "X1", which used a custom mirrorless camera and rapid lighting strobes to allow digital replacement of portrait backgrounds without using colored chroma key backgrounds.

On January 28, 2017, Lifetouch closed all of the portrait studios that were present in select Target stores.

The company was acquired by Shutterfly in 2018 in an all-cash deal valued at $825 million.

In January 2026, it was announced that Canadian-based Everest Solutions would acquire the Canadian operations of Lifetouch, Lifetouch Canada and is currently operating as "Lifetouch Powered By Everest". The acquisition makes Everest Solutions the largest provider of school photography in Canada. Everest Solutions was founded in 2021 by former Lifetouch employees.

In February 2026, it was falsely claimed that Lifetouch may have been connected to the Epstein files, leading to schools in some parts of the United States cancelling their picture days as a result. The allegations stem from online reporting surrounding the corporate hierarchy of Lifetouch and its supposed beneficial owner, Leon Black. Black is the former CEO of Apollo Global Management, owner of Lifetouch, who resigned in March, 2021 due to ties to Jeffrey Epstein. These claims have been refuted by USA Today, stating that Lifetouch had only came into Apollo's ownership a month after Epstein's death in 2019. Additionally, Lifetouch released a public statement on their website stating that the company itself was not included in the files, that Lifetouch itself had no involvement with activities relating to Jeffrey Epstein, that photos are only shared with schools and parents, and that employees of Apollo never had access to any student photos.

== Philanthropic partnerships ==
The Lifetouch Memory Mission was an annual volunteer trip that provided humanitarian aid to underprivileged communities around the world. Its first venture in 2000 was to war-ravaged Kosovo. Missions have since traveled to Appalachia, Jamaica, land of the Navajo, Haiti, Dominican Republic, and have assisted with Hurricane Katrina, floods in the Dakotas, fires in California, and tornadoes across the Midwest. Lifetouch completed its final Lifetouch Memory Mission in January 2024.

Lifetouch and the National Center for Missing & Exploited Children (NCMEC) announced in 2004 a joint national effort to enhance child safety through the Lifetouch SmileSafe Kids program. Photo identification cards are produced free of charge for every school student Lifetouch photographs. Lifetouch maintains a 24/7 response team to provide images of missing children to NCMEC within minutes. To date, the card has been credited with the safe return of children in 23 states.

Additional Lifetouch partners include the Canadian Centre for Child Protection, American Association of School Administrators, National Association of Elementary School Principals, National Association of Secondary School Principals, National PTA. and the Pediatric Brain Tumor Foundation.
