= Johnson Publishing Company =

American publishing company based in Chicago, Illinois (1942–2019)

- Type: Privately held company
- Industry: Mass media
- Founded: November 1942; 84 years ago
- Founder: John H. Johnson; Eunice W. Johnson
- Defunct: April 2019; 7 years ago
- Headquarters: 200 S. Michigan Avenue; Chicago, Illinois, U.S.
- Key people: (chief executive officer)
- Products: Books; Magazines; Television; Cosmetics
- Revenue: US$90 million (c. 2013)
- Website: johnsonpublishing.com

Johnson Publishing Company, Inc. (JPC) was an American publishing company founded in November 1942 by African-American businessman John H. Johnson. It was headquartered in Chicago, Illinois. JPC was privately held and run by Johnson until his death in 2005. His publications "forever changed the popular representation of African Americans." The writing portrayed African Americans as they saw themselves and its photojournalism made history. Led by its flagship publication, Ebony, Johnson Publishing was at one time the largest African-American-owned publishing firm in the United States. JPC also published Jet, a weekly news magazine, from November 1951 until June 2014, when it became digital only. In the 1980s, the company branched into film and television.

The company's last chairman and chief executive officer (CEO) was the founder's daughter, Linda Johnson Rice. In its final years, Johnson Publishing Company sold off assets including its historic 820 S. Michigan Avenue headquarters in 2011, and its publications in 2016. In April 2019, JPC filed for liquidation, ending the company's 76-year run. The historic Ebony/Jet photo archives, which JPC retained after the sale of its Ebony and Jet magazines, were sold in July 2019 for $30 million to a group of art and educational foundations to make them available to the public.

== History ==
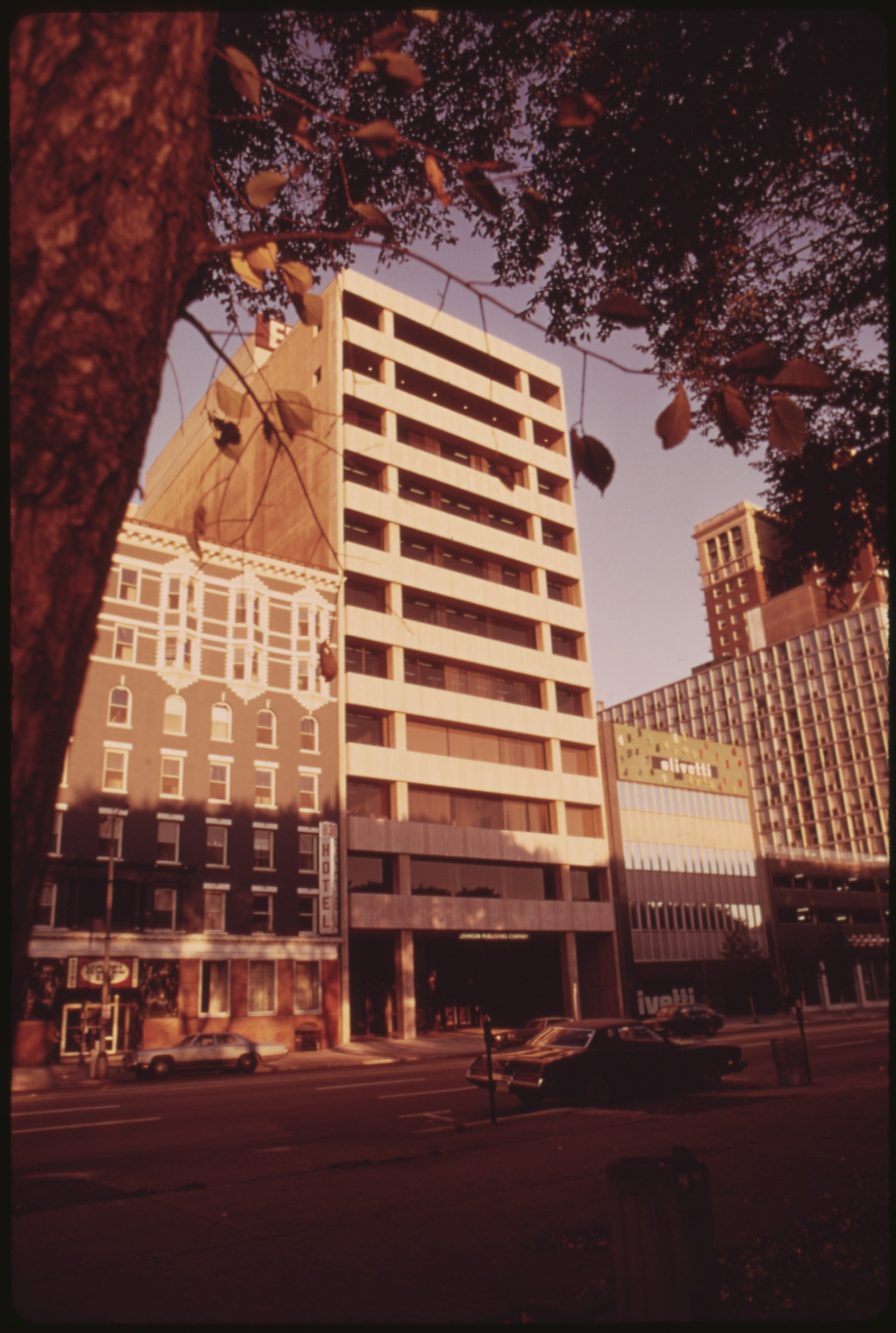
JPC headquarters at 820 S. Michigan Avenue in Chicago, 1973. Photo by John H. White.

Johnson Publishing Company was founded in 1942 by John Harold Johnson, who was working as an office clerk for Chicago-based Supreme Life Insurance Company of America. Using money from a $500 loan that was secured with his mother's furniture, Johnson mailed $2 charter subscription offers to members who had life insurance through Supreme Life. In return, he received more than 3,000 completed subscription offers and with that money he printed his first publication, Negro Digest, in November 1942. By mid-1943, the monthly circulation of Negro Digest had reached 50,000 copies.

=== Headquarters ===
820 S. Michigan Avenue, the iconic building constructed for the Johnson Publishing Company, publishers of Ebony and Jet magazines, was designed by John Moutoussamy, and was the first African-American-owned building in Chicago's downtown area. It remains the only Chicago high-rise to be designed by an African American.

Johnson Publishing had several locations throughout its history. The first headquarters from 1942 until 1943, was inside the Supreme Life Building at 3501 S. Parkway Ave (later renamed Dr. Martin Luther King Jr. Drive). As the company grew, Johnson then purchased a building at 5619 S. State Street in 1943. Six years later, in 1949, it relocated to 1820 South Michigan Avenue, a former funeral home. In December 1971, the company moved to 820 S. Michigan.

In Fall 2017, the City of Chicago designated the Johnson Building as a city landmark. Shortly thereafter, 3L Real Estate, a developer that specializes in the repurposing of classic real estate, bought the former headquarters from Columbia College Chicago and converted the office space into 150 rental apartments.

The iconic, psychedelic Ebony Test Kitchen, used by the magazine's food editors to test recipes, was donated by 3L Real Estate to Landmarks Illinois which in turn transferred it to New York's Museum of Food and Drink. The original Ebony/Jet sign that sits atop the building has been preserved and serves both as a welcome sign from the air and an anchor for the rooftop deck with sweeping views of Grant Park, Lake Michigan and Chicago's Museum Campus.

3L Real Estate CEO Joe Slezak said it was important to maintain original features when possible and worked with interior designer Elizabeth Watters to keep subtle reminders of the initial decor designed by Arthur Elrod and William Raiser. "From the lobby, with large swaths of original wood wall paneling, to ottomans reupholstered using material (curtains/rugs) from the Johnson Publishing days, the vibe is oh so ’70s."

Barbara Karant's forthcoming book, 820 Ebony/Jet: Visions of the Johnson Publishing Company, an American Icon, documents the significance of the building through approximately 140 color photographs and a collection of essays.

=== Staff ===
In the early 1970s, the company's staff consisted of 300 people; 175 of them were located at the Chicago headquarters while the others worked at branch offices in Los Angeles, New York City, and Washington D.C. The company had grown to 1400 employees by the end of 1980. Johnson's family held roles within the company. His wife, Eunice W. Johnson, was the founder, secretary, treasurer, and director of the Ebony Fashion Fair. His son, John H. Johnson Jr., served as a staff photographer for both Ebony and Jet magazines from 1975 until his death in December 1981. Johnson's daughter Linda Johnson Rice served as fashion coordinator of the Ebony Fashion Fair before becoming the company's CEO in 2003.

The Johnson Publishing Company hired a number of notable photographers, including Bryan Berteaux.

=== Impact ===
Johnson once stated, "I wasn't trying to make history, I was trying to make money." According to media historian Brenna Wynn Greer, he managed to do both. His publications both filled a niche in the market and "forever changed the popular representation of African Americans." It portrayed African Americans as they saw themselves. Its photographs created for photojournalism made history.

== Publications ==
In 1942, The company published their first magazine, Negro Digest. Negro Digest, which was modeled after the Reader's Digest was published from November 1942 until 1951 when it was discontinued in favor of Ebony and Jet magazines. The magazine returned to circulation in June 1961 and was later renamed Black World in 1970. Under the new name, the magazine was published for six years until it was canceled again in 1976. The company began publishing Ebony magazine in November 1945. Ebony focused on African-American community, culture, and achievements. The magazine quickly became successful, at one time gaining more than 1.3 million readers. After the instant success of Ebony, Johnson created another publication, named Jet in 1951. Jet, dubbed "The Weekly Negro News Magazine", was a mini-size weekly magazine that featured African American entertainers, community issues, public figures and a woman (predominately black) featured as "Jet's Beauty of the Week". Beginning in 2011, Jet magazine went from a weekly publication to bi-weekly, later converting into digital only in July 2014; publishing its last print magazine in June 2014. The company operated a book division, which published books such as The New Ebony Cookbook and the more controversial Forced into Glory: Abraham Lincoln's White Dream.

== Film and television ==
The company produced the film The Secret of Selling the Negro Market, which was released in 1954. The film was designed to encourage advertisers to promote their products and services in the African-American media.

=== Ebony/Jet Celebrity Showcase ===
The company produced Ebony/Jet Celebrity Showcase, a spinoff television show from the two magazines. The show debuted on August 1, 1982. It was eventually pulled off the air because John H. Johnson was dissatisfied with the quality of the guests. Ebony/Jet Showcase, a weekly, nationally syndicated TV show hosted by Greg Gumbel and Deborah Crable debuted in September 1985. By the show's third year in 1987, it was the only Black-syndicated program to reach 92 percent of Black U.S. television households and 73 percent of U.S. television households, strengthening its position as the No. 1 Black-oriented interview and entertainment show. The last episode of the program aired in October 1993.

== Other ventures ==
=== Ebony Fashion Fair and cosmetics ===
For over 40 years beginning in 1958, The company hosted the Ebony Fashion Fair, a traveling fashion show started by Eunice W. Johnson. The show raised money for scholarships and charities in cities across the United States and Canada. The fashion fair held its last show in 2009 due to the illness and later death of Johnson. In addition, Johnson Publishing produces a line of cosmetics marketed to women of color. Named Fashion Fair Cosmetics, the line was founded in 1973 and was formerly available in over 2,500 stores worldwide. A United Kingdom creditor petitioned a judge to force the company to sell its Fashion Fair Cosmetics UK assets in April 2019. In 2022, FFC was relaunched in over 250 Sephora stores, as well as online.

=== WJPC radio ===
Johnson Publishing Company purchased WGRT radio station in May 1973 for $1.8 million from Atlass Communications Inc. The company later renamed the station WJPC and began broadcasting on November 1, 1973. WJPC was the first Black-owned radio station in Chicago. WJPC-FM, a predominately R&B and soul station operated from November 1973 until it was sold in December 1994.

== Decline ==
In May 2009, R.R. Donnelley & Sons Company, which printed Ebony and Jet magazines, took a mortgage totaling nearly $12 million against the company headquarters, due to nonpayment of the magazine's printing bill. In July 2011, it was announced that JPMorgan would become a partner in the company. Then-CEO Desiree Rogers stated that JPMorgan held a 'minority stake' and presence on the board.

=== Sale of headquarters, building plans ===
In January 2011, the company sold its headquarters of nearly 40 years located at 820 S. Michigan Avenue to Columbia College Chicago. In November 2017, The building was sold by the college to 3L Real Estate for $10 million and converted into luxury apartments named 820Michigan. The real estate company stated that the Johnson Publishing Company sign with logo and flagship magazine names would remain located atop the building.

=== Sale of publications, photo archives, and bankruptcy ===
In March 2015, the company offered the Ebony/Jet photo archives spanning more than 70 years, for sale to reduce the company's debt. In June 2016, the company announced the sale of Ebony and Jet magazines. The buyer, Clear View Group, a private equity firm based in Austin, Texas, created a new publisher called Ebony Media Corp. The specialty cosmetics business and fashion publications were retained by Johnson.

On April 9, 2019, the company filed for Chapter 7 bankruptcy liquidation in a U.S. Bankruptcy Court in Chicago, Illinois. The company's number of creditors was listed between 200 and 999. The assets and liabilities were between $10 million and $50 million. The company released a statement about the bankruptcy filling:

This decision was not easy, nor should it have been. Johnson Publishing Company is an iconic part of American and African American history since our founding in 1942, and the company's impact on society cannot be overstated.

On April 22, 2019, Mellody Hobson, president of Chicago-based Ariel Investments, and her husband, film maker George Lucas, petitioned to take possession of the Ebony photo archives. They stated that the collection had been used as collateral for a $12 million loan that Johnson Publishing received from Capital Holdings V, which is owned by Hobson and Lucas, in 2015. In July 2019 as part of the bankruptcy proceedings, the more than 4 million item Ebony and Jet archives were auctioned off in Chicago. Winning the week-long auction was the $30 million bid by a consortium of foundations led by the J. Paul Getty Trust, with co-purchasers the Ford Foundation, the John D. and Catherine T. MacArthur Foundation and the Andrew W. Mellon Foundation. The archives will go to the Getty Research Institute and the National Museum of African American History and Culture to be made digitally available to the public. As of 2022, more than 4-million items have been undergoing cataloging and conservation in Chicago by archivist Steven Booth, and were being lent out for programs and exhibitions.

In January 2020 Johnson Publishing Company auctioned its art collection, the last of its major assets. The 87-piece art collection included works by Carrie Mae Weems, Henry Ossawa Tanner, Dindga McCannon, Kenneth Victor Young and Walter J. Williams. The auction earned just under three million dollars.

== Legacy and tributes ==
In 2010, Chicago Public Schools and Noble Network of Charter Schools opened Johnson College Prep, a public charter high school in Chicago's Englewood neighborhood which was named in honor of John H. and Eunice Johnson.

The Chicago History Museum created an exhibition titled Inspiring Beauty: 50 Years Of Ebony Fashion Fair, which was on display from March 2013 until May 2014. The exhibition traveled around the country, including stops at the Museum of Design Atlanta and the Milwaukee Art Museum.

The Rebuild Foundation held an exhibition for the company called A Johnson Publishing Story at The Stony Island Arts Bank in Chicago, Illinois. The exhibition, which featured paintings, books, sculptures, furnishings and interior design elements from the 820 S. Michigan Avenue headquarters ran from June 28, 2018, until September 30, 2018. In 2018, An exhibition called The Black Image Corporation featured photos from the company's archives. The exhibition, which was held at the Martin-Gropius-Bau in Berlin, ran from 2018 until July 28, 2019.

In 2020, the educational charity consortium which obtained the historic photo archives during the dissolution of the company, appointed an advisory committee, headed by Librarian of Congress Carla Hayden. The committee will oversee their organization and availability to the public.

In 2024, the Rebuild Foundation opened an exhibition, "Theaster Gates: When Clouds Roll Away: Reflection and Restoration from the Johnson Archive" at the Stony Island Arts Bank. Scheduled to run into March, 2025, the exhibition combines original work by Gates, Kerry James Marshall, Ellsworth Kelly, Barkley Hendricks and others with furnishings, decor, and archival materials that Gates salvaged from the Johnson Publishing Company's Michigan Avenue building in 2010.

== Publications ==
- Ebony – monthly general interest magazine (November 1, 1945 – June 2016)
- EbonyJet.com – branded web presence (circa 2007 – June 2016)
- Ebony Jr! (May 1973 – October 1985), resumed online in 2007
- Negro Digest (November 1942 – November 1951) resumed in June 1961, renamed Black World (May 1970 – April 1976)
- Tan Confessions (November 1950 – August 1952), renamed Tan (September 1952 – October 1971), renamed Black Stars
- Black Stars (November 1971 – July 1981)
- Hue (November 1953 –)
- Copper Romance (November 1953 –)
- Ebony Man: EM (November 1985 – January 1998)
- E Style (a catalog venture with Spiegel, September 1993 –)
- Ebony South Africa (November/December 1995 – September 2000)
- Jet – weekly news magazine, (November 1, 1951 – June 2014)

== Divisions ==
- Fashion Fair, LLC – cosmetics line
- JPC Book Division – book publishing
- JPC Consumer Products, LLC – Ebony lifestyle branding
- Ebony/Jet Entertainment Group, LLC – branded multimedia entertainment

=== Former divisions ===
- Supreme Beauty Products – (Duke/Raveen)
- WJPC Radio (now under different ownership as WSFS)
- Ebony Fashion Fair – traveling fashion show

== See also ==
- African-American book publishers in the United States, 1960–80
