= Mira Lowe =

Mira Lowe is an American journalist and dean of the School of Journalism & Graphic Communication at Florida A&M University. She served as the first woman editor-in-chief of Jet, a weekly digital magazine focused on African-American culture.

== Early life ==
Lowe was born in Brooklyn, New York, to working-class parents from North Carolina. Growing up, she would spend summers in the South with her grandparents and extended family. She attended Brooklyn College, where she earned a bachelor's degree in television and radio from in 1984. After graduation, she was an instructor for TRIO, a federally-funded program to support underrepresented communities and students. She then earned a master's degree in journalism from Columbia University in 1988.

== Career ==
After graduating from Columbia, Lowe worked at Newsday for 18 years, eventually becoming a news editor. She then became the first woman editor-in-chief of Jet. In 2012, she joined CNN Digital as senior editor for features.

In 2017, she was hired as Director of the Innovation News Center, the multimedia newsroom of the University of Florida. From 2019 through 2021, she also served as president of the Journalism & Women Symposium.

In 2021, she joined Florida A&M University as the dean of the School of Journalism & Graphic Communication. She has been featured by the Nieman Lab's Predictions for Journalism multiple times, an initiative of Harvard University's Neiman Foundation for Journalism.
