= John H. Johnson =

American businessman and publisher (1918–2005)

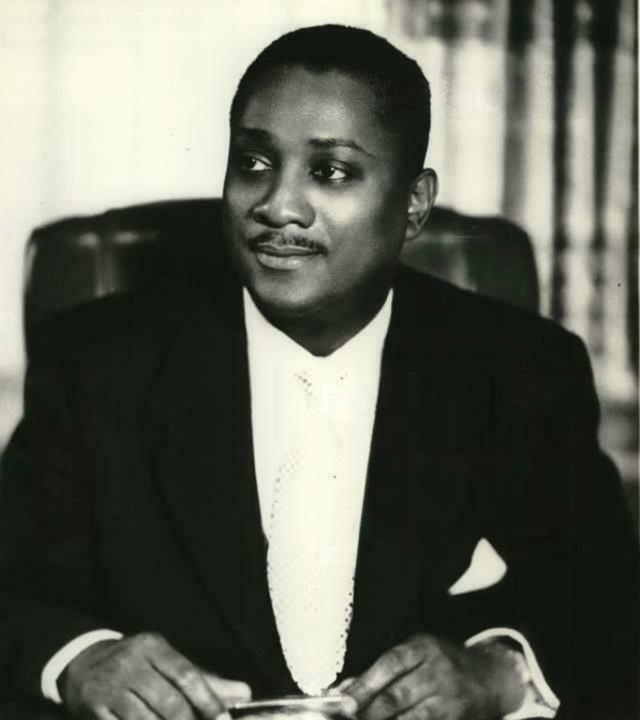
- Johnson in 1954
- Born: John Harold Johnson; January 19, 1918; Arkansas City, Arkansas, U.S.
- Died: August 8, 2005 (aged 87); Chicago, Illinois, U.S.
- Resting place: Oak Woods Cemetery (Chicago, Illinois)
- Education: University of Chicago; Northwestern University
- Occupations: Businessman; publisher
- Years active: 1942–2003
- Organization: Johnson Publishing Company (founder)
- Notable credits: Negro Digest; Ebony; JET
- Spouse: Eunice Walker (m. 1941)
- Children: 2

John Harold Johnson (January 19, 1918 – August 8, 2005) was an American business executive and publisher. In 1942, he founded the Johnson Publishing Company, headquartered in Chicago, Illinois. Johnson's company was among the most influential African-American businesses in media in the second half of the twentieth century, with the inception of print magazines, Ebony (1945) and Jet (1951) peaking at 9 million subscribers.

Johnson was born into a poor family in Arkansas. In the early 1930s, during the eve of the Great Depression, which coincided with the Great Migration of African Americans out of the Southern United States, his family moved to Chicago. He became a standout student at DuSable High School, and received a scholarship to the University of Chicago. He worked for an African American owned insurance company in his early career and to put himself through university. Seeing a need for African American representation in American media, he founded his publishing company in the early 1940s and would remain its leader until his death in 2005.

In 1982, Johnson became the first African American to appear on the Forbes 400. In 1987, he was named Black Enterprise Entrepreneur of the decade. Johnson was awarded the Presidential Medal of Freedom by United States President Bill Clinton in 1996.

== Biography ==
=== Early years and education ===
John H. Johnson was born in Arkansas City, Arkansas, to parents Gertrude and Leroy Johnson, both the children of slaves. Leroy died in 1926 in a sawmill accident. Gertrude worked as a cook in a Mississippi river levee camp, and was passionate about education. In 1927 Johnson lived through the Great Mississippi flood which displaced him and his family. As a child, he lived on the levee and observed racial dynamics firsthand. Johnson had a half-sister from his mother named Beulah, she would join a religious organization who followed a man named Father Divine and would disappear, dying sometime in the 40s. Gertrude Johnson would remarry Johnson's step father, who died 1961, some years after Leroy's death. In the process of completing middle school, Johnson and his mother spent a year in Vicksburg in 1930 where he attended St. Mary's Catholic school. Johnson attended a segregated school and completed middle school in 1932. He then repeated the 8th grade to save up to move to Chicago to further his education.

His family moved to Chicago at the time of the 1933 Chicago World's Fair, during the Great Migration of African Americans out of the South. To make the move possible Gertrude left her husband in Arkansas, though they would later reunite. His family spent many years living on welfare, this would be, according to Johnson, one of his biggest motivators. After his move to Chicago he initially attended Wendell Phillips High School. After it burned down he moved to DuSable High School. His classmates at DuSable included Nat King Cole, Redd Foxx, and Harold Washington. This only fueled his already formidable determination to "make something of himself." Johnson's high-school career was distinguished by the leadership qualities he demonstrated as student council president, as editor of the school newspaper and class yearbook, leader of the student forum, and president of the French club. He started studying self-improvement books to become a better speaker. During his graduation ceremony Johnson would give the only student speech, this speech was picked up by the Chicago Defender, at which point Johnson would change his name to John Harold Johnson.

After he graduated with honors in 1936, he was offered a scholarship to the University of Chicago. Although tuition was fully covered, other expenses were not. Because of his achievements in high school, Johnson was invited to speak at a dinner held by the Urban League. When Harry Pace, president of the Supreme Life Insurance Company, heard Johnson's speech, he was so impressed with him that he offered Johnson a job so that he would be able to use the scholarship.

Johnson began as an office boy at Supreme Life in 1936, and within two years had become Pace's assistant. His duties included preparing a monthly digest of newspaper articles. By 1939, he was editing Supreme Life's in-house magazine and dropped out of college that same year, taking on a full-time role at SLL by 1941. Johnson would drop out of college around 1939 at which point he was working full time at SLL. While at SLL Johnson met Earl Dickerson, a prominent lawyer and activist in the Chicago Black community. This connection to Dickerson led to Johnson being named to assist in his campaign for alderman of Chicago's Second Ward, against William L. Johnson. After assisting in Dickerson's campaign Johnson was named political secretary.

His working compiling and gathering news exposed him to Black newspapers around the country, and Johnson became an informal source of news in the Black community. Johnson began to wonder if others might not enjoy the same type of service. He conceived of a publication patterned after Reader's Digest. His work at Supreme Life also gave him the opportunity to see the day-to-day operations of a business owned by an African American and fostered his dream of starting a business of his own.. He eventually met his wife Eunice Walker in 1940 while she was attending Loyola University for a master's degree in social work. They got married on June 21, 1941, in Selma, Alabama, and would adopt 2 children John Harold Johnson Jr in 1956 and Linda Johnson in 1958, Johnson Junior would pass away at the age of 25 in 1981 from sickle cell anemia.

== Johnson Publishing Company ==
=== Negro Digest ===
Once the idea of Negro Digest occurred to him, it began to seem like a "black gold mine," Johnson stated in his autobiography Succeeding against the Odds. He spent months searching for funding, despite that he remained enthusiastic even though he was discouraged on all sides from doing so. Only his mother, a woman with biblical faith and deep religious convictions, as well as a powerful belief in her son, supported his vision and allowed him to use her furniture as collateral for a $500 loan to buy stamps. He used those stamps to mail offers to 20,000 policyholders in the SLL phonebook, securing 3,000 subscribers at $2 each. He used the funds to publish the first edition of Negro Digest in 1942, which featured Langston Hughes and Walter White, tying the publication to civil rights. It countered stereotypes by showcasing Black professionals, artists, and history. Johnson would get a deferment for World War II, being deemed too vital to the distribution of information nationally. During its early days, the Negro Digest was run out of the SLL law library. Johnson had a problem with distribution until he teamed up with Joseph Levy, a magazine distributor who was impressed with him. Levy provided valuable marketing tips and opened the doors that allowed the new digest to reach newsstands in other urban centers. In order to convince publishers there was newsstand demand he reimbursed friends and coworkers who bought most of the copies, and would then resell them later. He would continue to use guerrilla tactics early on to sell his magazine. He had salesmen across the country directly selling the magazine. In addition, he employed postmen to help geomap his target population within cities to more efficiently place flyers. He also took it upon himself to sell in busses, streetcars, and even in cotton fields to get his magazine out into the open market. Within six months, circulation had reached 50,000. In 1943, he would unofficially leave SLL to focus on his magazine, though he wouldn't officially leave until he started buying shares in the company, eventually becoming its CEO. Johnson would purchase his first property in 1943, which would eventually become the first headquarters of the Johnson Publishing Company. Negro Digest was brought to new heights when First Lady Eleanor Roosevelt wrote a column in 1943, increasing circulation to 150,000 readers. Due to American war efforts, he was told in 1945 that he needed to reduce his publishing reach by almost fourfold. To rectify this, he went to a lawyer by the name of J. Norman Goddess, who advised him to plead to the government on his own to garner sympathy. He made an impassioned plea to the War Production Board and won, allowing him to continue publishing and preventing the Negro Digest from collapsing. This publication covered African-American history, literature, arts, and cultural issues. In 1951, Negro Digest was discontinued, having been dwarfed by Ebony. It would make a brief return in the 1960s under the name Black World before its ultimate dissolution in 1976.

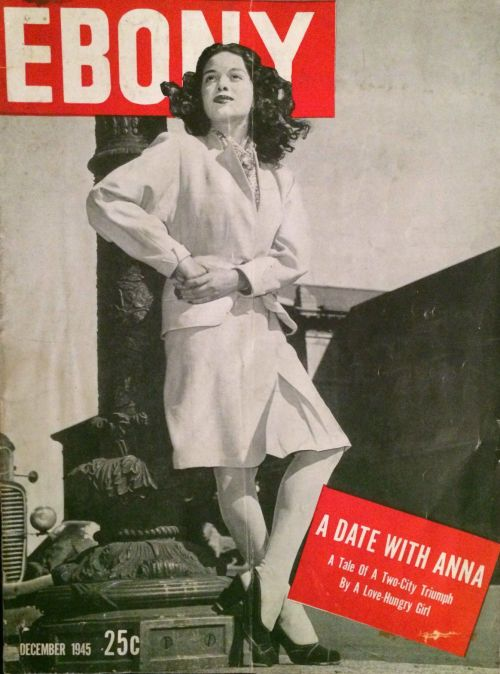
A cover of Ebony, one of Johnson's landmark publications

=== Ebony and JET ===
Although Negro Digest achieved some success and at its height had a circulation of more than 100,000, it was dwarfed by Johnson's subsequent publication, Ebony, which was so popular that its initial run of 25,000 copies easily sold out. The articles in Ebony, were designed to look like those in Life or Look magazines, designed to emphasize the achievements of successful African Americans. Another major reason for Ebony was to allow black people to see themselves in publications for the first time, countering stereotypes by showcasing Black professionals, artists, and history. The name came from a concept Jive brought to him by investors, this concept was realized when Eunice came up with the name Ebony and when the other investors left Johnson capitalized. Photo essays about current events and articles about race relations were also included in the magazine, along with its initial focus on the rich and famous in the African-American community. In 1946 Ebony would run into its first major issues, the expensive prospect of printing in color, combined with a lack of advertising. After rejection from countless advertisement agencies Johnson would again resort to guerilla methods to get advertisements in his magazine. The first success came with Fairfax Cone and the American Association of Advertising Agencies. Johnson would meet him every week on a train to New York, eventually wearing him down and landing an invaluable asset to future advertisement. While working towards bigger advertisement opportunities he would create 4 mail order companies to occupy advertisements in his magazine. Those companies were; Beauty Star Cosmetics, Linda Fashions, The Negro Digest Book Shop, and Star Glow Wigs. They advertised solely in Ebony and sold cosmetic items, clothing, vitamins and books, and wigs all through mail order.

Ebony’s first big meeting came from Zenith radios, a meeting built on the condition that it would not be a meeting about advertising in Ebony. Johnson brought CEO Eugene F. McDonald a signed copy of a biography of Arctic explorer Matthew Henson, a personal hero of McDonald's, leading Ebony’s first major advertisement contract. This meeting would also directly lead to the partnership with Swift Packing Company, Elgin Watch Company, Armour food company, and Quaker Oats. In 1947 Johnson would convince William P. Grayson to leave the Baltimore Afro-American to start and head the new East division of Ebony, what would later become the Johnson Publishing Company in New York City. In 1948 many changes were made to the paper, it was increased in size to 68 pages and most importantly, Johnson would expand reporting to include issues such as "the white problem in America", African-American militancy, crimes by African Americans against African Americans, civil rights legislation, Freedom Rides, and other aspects of racism. Professional historians were recruited for the magazine's staff so that the contributions of African Americans to the history of the United States could be adequately documented. African-American models were used in the magazine's advertisements Ebony would serve as the nations introduction to models like Pam Grier, Diahann Carol, Jane Kennedy, and Lola Falana. In 1949 the company needed a new space, for what was known at the time as the Negro Digest company, to operate out of. Being unable to buy a place on his own due to being Black, he would buy a place 15 blocks from downtown using a trust. To buy and renovate the location Johnson sold Beauty Star Cosmetics. One of Ebony's most well known and regarded issues was the 1968 issue covering the assassination of Martin Luther King Jr. in which Moneta Sleet would take photos for the magazine that would win her a Pulitzer Prize. By 31 he was a millionaire, one of less than 25 thousand at the time, a group of less than just over 1 hundredth of percent of the national population. Johnson maintained that Ebony's success was due to the positive image of African Americans that it offered. Everything in the magazine was addressed to the African-American consumer.

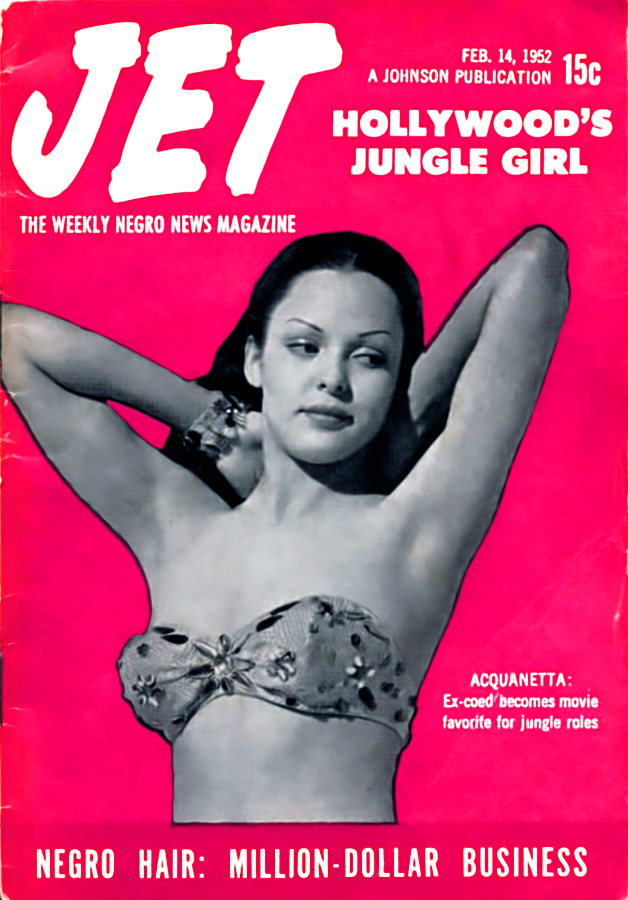
A cover design for one of Johnson's defining works, the magazine Jet

In order to satisfy demands for certain types of magazines Johnson would release a variety of magazines. In 1950 Johnson launched Tan, a "true confessions"-type magazine and Copper Romance. To continue to satisfy the demand for a variety of magazines he released Jet, a weekly news digest, began and Hue. Jet had been a concept for a long time and would get actualized when Johnson would buy the name from a small airplane mechanic magazine. Jet was designed to be a pocket sized magazine, and was run in a weekly format to complement Ebony's monthly editions. It covered Martin Luther King Jr., the 1963 March on Washington, and the 1957 Little Rock desegregation. Writers attended Southern church meetings, offering insider civil rights perspectives. With the major expansion of his holdings Johnson needed to expand across the country. To do so he relocated his New York City offices to the Rockefeller building. The next project for him was expansion in Washington D.C. he started out small, becoming the first black business to have business offices in D.C. Eventually however, Johnson would leverage his ties to The Chicago Tribune and would land a lease for a building within a block of the White House. Although all of the magazines achieved a measure of success, none was able to compete with Ebony, which in its 40th year of publication had a circulation of 2,300,000 and was his primary publication. Johnson was also instrumental in the civil rights movement and its widespread coverage and dissemination. He worked with Martin Luther King Jr. multiple times to be able to the first people on the scenes of important events and get Black coverage through Ebony and Jet. In 1957 King even contributed to Jet as a columnist. One of Johnson's most notable issues of Jet was the September 15, 1955 issue in which he published a picture of a Chicago–youth Emmett Till's mutilated body after it had arrived in Chicago from Mississippi. People considered Johnson's decision to publish Till's photograph his greatest moment. Michigan congressman Charles Diggs recalled that given the emotion the image stimulated, it was "probably one of the greatest media products in the last 40 or 50 years". Because of the reach of Ebony and Jet president Dwight D. Eisenhower met with Johnson, this would start a pipeline of information in which every single subsequent president to his death met with Johnson to form a relation with the man Lyndon B. Johnson described as “the only man who can get 20 million people to listen to you.” A meeting with John F. Kennedy would lead to a major breakthrough with Ford Motor Company, obtaining sponsorship after nearly a decade of attempts. Throughout Johnson's entire life, the only edition of Ebony that didn't get released was the June 1946 edition, which was halted by a nationwide coal strike. In 1955 always looking to expand Johnson would add an international wing with Ebony South Africa though it would be discontinued after 5 years. In 2002 Johnson would name Linda Johnson as the new CEO while remaining as the chairman and publisher

=== Other ventures ===
Johnson marks his addition into the National Urban League as the beginning of his foray into the world of big business. Johnson served as the sponsor for the American Black Achievement Award Show throughout his life. In the late 50s a Woman named Ernestine Dent asked Johnson to help fund a fashion show called the Ebony Fashion Fair, he funded the venture solely, receiving only the cost of the 3 dollar Ebony subscription that came with it, the rest would go to charity. The show toured over 200 cities across the United States, Canada, and the Caribbean, raising between $47 and $51 million for the United Negro College Fund (UNCF) and other Black charities.

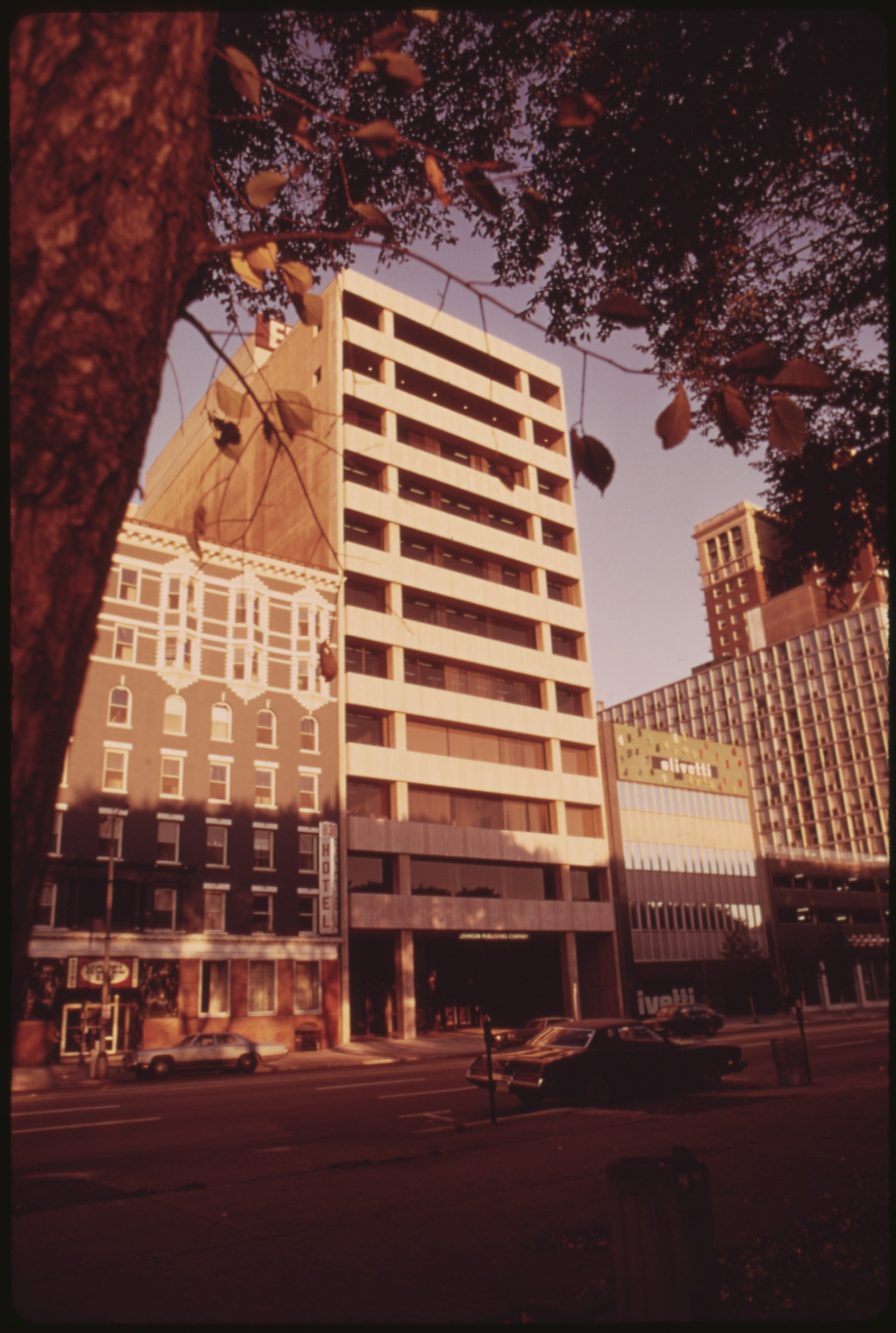
Headquarters for the Johnson Publishing Company at 820 Michigan Ave. It is the first and still only black designed building in downtown Chicago.

Johnson Publishing also has a book division with the release of Before the Mayflower by Lerone Bennett in 1959, which employed more than 2,600 people, with sales of over $388 million. The most well known release from this division was his biography that he wrote with Lerone Bennett called Succeeding Against the Odds which released in 1993. In 1971 Johnson was added to the 20th Century Fox board of directors, when the company went private he was the only one to remain on the board because of his work. His work on the Fox board would become well known and would result in his inclusion on the boards of Greyhound Corp and Bell and Howell. He would serve for many years on the special executive board of these corporations. In addition to the executive positions he also held board positions on Zenith, Continental Bank, Dillards Department Stores, and Chrysler. Johnson would also begin purchasing shares of SLL throughout the 70s and 80s and would eventually become the majority shareholder and the CEO. Another significant venture of Johnson's was creating a cosmetic line for Black women, he first approached Estée Lauder and Revlon who surreptitiously turned him down. He then decided to launch his own line in 1973 called Fashion Fair Cosmetics and Supreme Beauty Products to fill the gap he had noticed. As he did with all of his business ventures he turned to guerrilla tactics to get the brand rolling. His brand would make its way into the Chicago and New York City malls where he would again pay people to buy out initial shipments. His next task was selling in the south, he would do this by going uninvited to a luncheon to honor Neiman-Marcus CEO Herbert Marcus where he would set up a meeting with him. His meeting would consist of dinner and a visit to the traveling Fashion Fair show that happened to be in Dallas at the time. This day would secure his inclusion in Neiman-Marcus south. His connections to the Dillards board and CEO would further his expansion into the south.

Johnson would further his expansion by starting a division in Paris. He would begin investing, buying a house in Palm Springs in 1968. He was also forced to move his Chicago headquarters around the same time, moving 10 blocks away to 820 South Michigan, which served as the final headquarters for the company. Furthering his investing he would purchase a hotel, an indoor parking lot, an outdoor parking structure, 2 warehouse buildings, and fund 97 percent of a government sponsored middle income complex called Lawless gardens. At the invention of cable, Johnson would join a group with 15 major investors for the group that wired the entire city of Chicago. Johnson bought a radio station in 1973 and renamed it the WJPC, which was the first black owned radio station in Chicago. He also purchased WLOU in Louisville though these AM stations would soon become irrelevant due to FM radio. To break into FM radio Johnson would purchase a small station outside of Chicago that was still able to be heard from inside the city, as all the station in the city were blocked to him because he was Black. Continuing his expansion Johnson wanted to break into Television, he would do this by hosting 2 award shows, the Ebony Music Awards, the precursor to programs like BET. His second award show was the American Black Achievements Award Show. He also had a weekly variety broadcast called the Ebony/Jet showcase which was run by Linda Johnson. Johnson would also start the EM magazine for Black men and become a 20% shareholder in Essence, a magazine for Black women. In 1971 Tan would get a rebrand as Black Stars.

Another Idea of Johnsons was Ebony Jr. made to fill another gap he saw, for a kids magazine similar to Highlights. Launched in 1973 to foster African-American children's identity, racial pride, and values, Ebony Jr. included stories like “A Christmas Blessing” (1982), which promoted generosity by aiding a homeless woman, and “Turkey Wings” (1984), which encouraged cultural awareness by linking to Native American traditions. It taught education, honesty, family loyalty, class consciousness, and progressive gender roles. It ceased publication in 1985, reflecting challenges in Black children's literature. Ebony Jr. empowered Black youth with values and identity, but its 1985 closure marked a decline in Black children's literature.

=== Honors and awards ===
Johnson won many awards, and was honored with many positions. He was an initiate of Alpha Phi Alpha fraternity, Chicago-based Theta chapter, in 1938. In 1951, he was the second African American to be selected as one of the ten Young Men of the Year by the United States Junior Chamber of Commerce. He won the National Association for the Advancement of Colored People's Spingarn Medal in 1966 for his contributions in the area of race relations. In 1966 Johnson got the Russworm award, the highest award from the Negro publishers guild. In 1966 Johnson would be added to the National Selective Service committee, despite his lack of military experience, having gotten a deferment for the Second World War. Also in 1966 Johnson received along with 11 others the Horatio Algers award by the American schools and colleges award, for people who embodied the "American Dream." He accompanied Vice President Nixon to nine African nations in 1957, and to Russia and Poland in 1959. In 1961, he was appointed special ambassador to Côte d'Ivoire's independence ceremonies, and in 1963 to Kenya's. In 1970, he was appointed to President Nixon's UN 25th Anniversary Commission. Because of his influential position in the African-American community, Johnson was invited by the US government to participate in several international missions. In 1972, he was named publisher of the year by the major magazine publishers in the United States. Over the years Johnson had devoted a portion of several issues of Ebony to articles relating to African independence movements, but in August 1976 he dedicated an entire special issue to the subject "Africa, the Continent of the Future". In 1977 he was named the most outstanding Black publisher in history by the National Newspaper Publishers Association.

In 1982 he earned the distinction of being the first African American placed on Forbes' list of 400 wealthiest Americans. In 1983 Johnson was inducted into the Chicago Business Hall of Fame. In 1984 he was named Chicagoan of the year. In 1985 he won the Jackie Robinson Award. In 1986, Johnson received the Golden Plate Award of the American Academy of Achievement. In 1987, Johnson was inducted into the Junior Achievement National Business Hall of Fame, Publishing Hall of Fame, and the Black press Hall of Fame. Also in 1987 he won the Black Journalists Lifetime Achievement Award. He won the 1988 'Salute to Greatness' award, an award made to honor Martin Luther King Jr. during the Arkansas celebration of his life with the same name. He received a Candace Award for Distinguished Service from the National Coalition of 100 Black Women in 1989. Also in 1989 he received the PUSH foundation's international humanitarian award. He supported ASALH with book exhibits, luncheon tickets, and a 1990 Chicago reception. In 1993, to celebrate the 50th anniversary of his publishing company, Johnson published his autobiography, in which he states "if it could happen to a Black boy from Arkansas it could happen to anyone". In 1995, Johnson received the Communication Award on the occasion of Ebony magazine's 50th anniversary. Alfred C. Sykes, chairman of the Center for Communication, and president of Hearst Media Technology, said "Mr. Johnson is a role model for many young people today, an example of how hard work, commitment and belief in oneself can lead to outstanding achievement. He rose from disadvantaged circumstances to achieve success in both business and national service during a time when great obstacles were placed in his path." In 1996, President Bill Clinton bestowed the Presidential Medal of Freedom on Johnson.

In early 2001, Johnson was inducted into the Arkansas Business Hall of Fame. In 2003 Baylor's school of business named him the greatest minority entrepreneur in U.S. history. He was also awarded honorary doctorates by the University of Arkansas at Pine Bluff, Harvard University, the University of Southern California, Carnegie Mellon University, Eastern Michigan University, and Wayne State University.

== Death, funeral and legacy ==
Johnson mausoleum at Oak Woods Cemetery

On August 8, 2005, Johnson died of congestive heart failure. He had a daughter, Linda Johnson-Rice. His son, John Jr. died in December 1981 after a long battle with an illness related to sickle cell at age 25. Following his death, a public viewing of his body was held at Johnson Publishing Headquarters on August 16, 2005. Johnson's funeral was held at University of Chicago's Rockefeller Memorial Chapel where an estimated 3,000 people attended, including former U.S. president Bill Clinton, future U.S. president Barack Obama, and civil rights leader Jesse Jackson. Bill Clinton, who spoke at Johnson's funeral was quoted saying "Out of the swarm of hardworking, family-loving men and women carving out their own version of the American dream, one man stood out because his dream was bigger and he had a vision for how to achieve it." Johnson was buried at Oak Woods Cemetery, in the Greater Grand Crossing neighborhood in Chicago.

In 2010, the Noble Network of Charter Schools and Chicago Public Schools opened Johnson College Prep High School, a public charter high school in Chicago Illinois' Englewood neighborhood in honor of Johnson and his wife Eunice. On January 31, 2012, the United States Postal Service honored John H. Johnson with a commemorative stamp as the newest addition to its Black Heritage Series. The School of Communications at Howard University was to be named in his honor but instead, the $4 million donation was used to endow a chair in entrepreneurship. Johnson was inducted into the Chicago Literary Hall of Fame in 2013.

The John H. Johnson Museum and Educational Center was founded in 2004 in Arkansas City by Desha/Jefferson counties and the University of Arkansas at Pine Bluff. In 2019, the Arkansas Legislature created John H. Johnson Day to pay tribute to his legacy and to help support the John H. Johnson museum. The Friends of the John H. Johnson Museum suggested November 1 as the date for the holiday because that was the date the first issue of Ebony was published. The 2019 John H. Johnson Day events featured Linda Johnson Rice, Dr. Margena A. Christian, Rodney Slater, and Mayor Frank Scott Jr., with awards for entrepreneurship, journalism, and humanitarianism.

In 2019, the remaining assets of Johnson Publishing Company were sold as part of a Chapter 7 bankruptcy proceeding.

== See also ==
- African-American business history
