= Woodnut S. Burr =

American suffragist (1861–1952)

Personal details
- Born: Woodnut Conwell Stilwell; August 28, 1861 Anderson, Indiana, U.S.
- Died: December 19, 1952 (aged 91) Santa Clara, California, U.S.
- Occupation: Women's suffrage advocate

Woodnut Conwell Stilwell Burr (August 28, 1861 – December 19, 1952) was an advocate for women's suffrage in the United States.

== Early life ==
Woodnut Conwell Stilwell Burr was born on August 28, 1861, in Anderson, Indiana, the daughter of Thomas Neel Stilwell (1830–1874) and Winifred Stilwell.

== Career ==
- She was an ardent worker for women's suffrage and civic betterment.
- She was the president of the Los Gatos Branch of the League of Women Voters.
- She was a member of Work Integrated Learning Programmes and Woman's Christian Temperance Union.

== Personal life ==
Woodnut S. Burr moved to California in 1911 and lived at 11 Peralta St., Los Gatos, California. She married Chauncey S. Burr (1840–1905) and had four children: Chauncey Stilwell Burr (1885–1964), Mrs. Fred Tusler, Mrs. N. J. Lennes, Mary Winifred Burr (1883–1912).

She died on December 19, 1952, in Santa Clara, California. She is buried in Oak Woods Cemetery in Chicago, Illinois.
