= Olan Mills Sr. =

American photographer and entrepreneur

- Born: May 9, 1904
- Died: April 15, 1978 (aged 73); Dallas, Texas, US
- Occupation: Entrepreneur
- Spouse: Mary Mills
- Website: web.archive.org/web/20140228154003/olanmills.com

Olan Mills Sr. (May 9, 1904 – April 15, 1978) was an American photographer and entrepreneur known for co-founding the company Olan Mills with his wife, Mary Mills.

== Life and career ==
In 1932, Mills and his wife launched their business in Selma, Alabama. They used an old shed which they converted into a darkroom. To improve business they started going door-to-door. In 1938, the couple opened its first permanent studio, located in Pine Bluff, Arkansas.

The first Olan Mills plant opened in 1940 in Springfield, Ohio.

Mills died at his home in Dallas on April 15, 1978, from head injuries sustained in a fall.
