= Call and Post =

African-American newspaper based in Ohio

- Type: Weekly newspaper
- Owner: Don King
- Founder: Garrett A. Morgan
- Publisher: Don King
- Editor: Dale Edwards
- Founded: 1928; 98 years ago, from merger formed by the Cleveland Call (1916) and Cleveland Post (1920) newspapers
- Headquarters: Cleveland, Ohio
- ISSN: 0045-4036
- OCLC number: 9538047
- Website: callandpost.com

The Call and Post (or Call & Post) is an African American weekly newspaper, based in Cleveland, Ohio. It is owned by boxing promoter Don King.

== History ==
The Call and Post was established around 1928 by a group of people including local African American inventor Garrett A. Morgan, as a merger between the Cleveland Call and the Cleveland Post, two newspapers that had been serving the African American community since 1916 and 1920 respectively. William Otis "W.O." Walker, a black Republican who had been co-founder of the Washington Tribune, became editor in 1932.

The Call and Post provided extensive coverage of the social and religious life in the African American community, and was known to feature sensational coverage of violence on its front page. The publication also extensively covered Larry Doby, the first black player to successfully integrate into the American League's Cleveland Indians baseball franchise. Reporter Cleveland Jackson communicated extensively with Indians owner and team president Bill Veeck before Doby was signed by the Indians in 1947.

With the influence of editor and publisher William O. Walker from 1932 until his death in 1981, the Call and Post established itself as the most influential voice for African Americans in Cleveland and ultimately all Ohio. It earned praise as one of the finest African American newspapers in the country. As early as 1934, the Call and Post was active in calling for public involvement in the Scottsboro case. In 1952, a former Call and Post reporter, Simeon Booker, became the first African American reporter at The Washington Post.

After moving to new offices in 1959, the Call and Post began to publish with offset printing. It was one of the first newspapers in Ohio to use the new technique.

Another example of advocacy took place in 1982, with a scathing editorial in support of Cleveland real estate developer Winston E. Willis, whose properties, located near University Circle, had been targeted by the Cleveland Clinic, Case Western Reserve University, and University Hospitals for expansion.

The Call and Post filed for bankruptcy in 1995, but was purchased in 1998 by boxing promoter Don King.

The Call and Post covers local news in Cleveland, Columbus, and Cincinnati, along with arts and entertainment in its CP2 (Call & Post 2nd edition) tabloid. The Call And Post was inducted into the first class of the Rhythm and Blues Hall of Fame in August 2013 at the Watjen Auditorium at Cleveland State University. It is currently located at 11800 Shaker Blvd. Cleveland, Ohio 44120.

== See also ==
- African American newspapers
