= William O. Walker =

African-American publisher (1896–1981)

Dr. William O. Walker
- Born: William Otis Walker; September 19, 1896; Selma, Alabama, U.S.
- Died: October 29, 1981 (aged 84); Cleveland, Ohio, U.S.
- Burial place: Lake View Cemetery
- Education: Wilberforce University B.A. journalism, Oberlin Business College, M.B. business
- Occupations: publisher of Cleveland Call and Post newspaper, politician, businessman, editor
- Years active: 1921–1981
- Political party: Republican
- Spouses: Theresa Brooks (m. 1919; div. 1955) Theresa Brooks (m. 1955)

Dr. William O. Walker aka W.O. Walker (born William Otis Walker on September 19, 1896 – died October 29, 1981) was an African-American publisher, Cleveland-area politician, and editor of the Call and Post, an African-American newspaper based in Cleveland. He was the African-American to serve in an Ohio Governor's cabinet.
