= Olan Mills =

Former portrait photography and church directory company

Olan Mills Inc.
- Industry: Portrait photography, Church Directories
- Founded: Alabama, 1932, by Olan Mills Sr. and Mary Mills
- Fate: Acquired by Lifetouch (2011)
- Headquarters: Chattanooga, Tennessee
- Key people: Olan Mills II, Chairman Emeritus, Robert L. McDowell, CEO and President; Laura Carden, Vice-President of Finance and CFO; David Butler, President of Church Directories Division
- Revenue: unknown
- Operating income: unknown
- Net income: unknown
- Number of employees: 3,700 (2001 est.)
- Website: lifetouch.com

Olan Mills, Inc. was a privately owned American company founded in 1932 by Olan Mills Sr. and Mary Mills that was headquartered in Chattanooga, Tennessee. It provided portrait photography and church directories through its two main corporate divisions: Olan Mills Portrait Studios and Olan Mills Church Division.

== History ==
In 1932, Olan Mills Sr. and Mary Mills founded Olan Mills, Inc., in Tuscaloosa, Alabama. In 1941, Mills relocated the company to Chattanooga, Tennessee.

On December 26, 2008, the United Kingdom division of Olan Mills, based in Northamptonshire and with numerous studios based in Mothercare stores, stopped trading, in preparation for the firm being placed into administration.

On November 9, 2011, Lifetouch Inc. announced that it had purchased the Olan Mills photography business, including Olan Mills Church Directories and Olan Mills Portrait Studios, along with its corporate functions, as well as the production operations in Chattanooga.

In January 2012, Lifetouch announced the closing of two of three Olan Mills facilities in Chattanooga, with a loss of 383 jobs.

In 2019, Lifetouch closed the third remaining facility, with a loss of an additional 150 jobs.

== See also ==
- Lifetouch

== Bibliography ==
- "Olan Mills joins Lifetouch". Lifetouch Church Directories. Archived from the original on 2018-06-19. "Olan Mills has now joined the Lifetouch family. Together, we have proudly been serving organizations for over 125 years combined."
- "Lifetouch Church Directories". Lifetouch Church Directories. Archived from the original on 2022-07-18. "Unfortunately, due to the tremendous continued and unforeseen impact of COVID-19 on our business and our community, Lifetouch Church Photography has permanently stopped our operations."
