= Ebony Fashion Fair =

Annual fashion show

- Type: Fashion Show
- Genre: Clothing and fashion exhibitions
- Founded: 1958; 68 years ago
- Defunct: 2009; 17 years ago
- Headquarters: Johnson Publishing Company; Chicago, Illinois
- Key people: Eunice Walker–Johnson (founder)
- Products: Cosmetics (1973)
- Website: fashionfair.com/aboutus.php

Ebony Fashion Fair (also known as the Ebony Traveling Fashion Fair) was an annual fashion event created by Eunice Johnson, co–founder of the Chicago, Illinois–based Johnson Publishing Company. The show ran across the United States and other countries from 1958 until 2009. In addition to the fashion fair, the company also created a cosmetic line named Fashion Fair Cosmetics, in 1973. As of 2026, Fashion Fair Cosmetics are still available for purchase.

== History ==
In 1956, John H. Johnson, founder of the Johnson Publishing Company, was approached by Jessie Dent (the wife of the president of Dillard University), who asked Johnson to supply models for a charity fundraiser benefiting the Flint-Goodridge Hospital located on Dillard University's New Orleans campus. Reluctant to use the models featured in the magazines published by his company, Johnson instead offered to provide the clothing. Johnson and Dent then came to an agreement: Johnson Publishing Company would supply the garments for the fundraiser, and, each ticket to enter the show would include a subscription to either Ebony or Jet Magazine—both published by Johnson's company.

The Ebony Fashion Fair was launched in 1958 by the Johnson Publishing company and repeated annually for five decades under Eunice Walker Johnson; the director and producer of the show. The Ebony Fashion Fair (also known as the Ebony Travelling Fashion Fair), traveled to 30 cities over its 51-year run providing exclusive fashion to “hundreds of thousands attendees across the United States, Canada and the Caribbean” (Bivins.11). The show was held in 187 venues with audiences as large as 5,000 attendees. The Ebony Fashion Fair not only helped to boost the Johnson Publishing Company's brand identity, it also raised $55 million in funds for African American charities. The show featured male and female models of mostly African-American descent modeling fashions from top European designers such as: Yves St Laurent, Oscar de la Renta, Pierre Cardin, Paco Rabanne, Givenchy, Jean Paul Gaultier, Valentino, and Emanuel Ungaro. The Fashion Fair held its last show in 2009, due to Eunice Walkers' death in January, 2010.

=== Fashion Show Themes, 1958-2009 ===
Year	Theme	# of Shows	# of Countries
1958	Ebony Fashion Fair Around The Clock	Example	Example
1959	Fashions Around The World	Example	Example
1960	Symphony In Fashions	Example	Example
1961	Ebony Fashion Fair International	Example	Example
1962	An Oriental Flair	Example	Example
1963	Ebony Fashion Fair Americana	Example	Example
1964	A Spanish Flair	Example	Example
1965	Fashions In Orbit	Example	Example
1966	Colorballo	Example	Example
1967	Fashion Rebellion	Example	Example
1968	Fashion Freedom	Example	Example
1969	The Flapper Returns with Soul	Example	Example
1970	The Liberated Look	Example	Example
1971	What's Goin' On	Example	Example
1972	A Way To Look	Example	Example
1973	The Mood Of Luxury	Example	Example
1974	The Big Whirl Of Fashion	Example	Example
1975	The Natural Feeling	Example	Example
1976	The Care-Free Life	Example	Example
1977	The Body Attitude	Example	Example
1978	Back To Glamour	Example	Example
1979	Color Explosion	Example	Example
1980	The Free Spirit	Example	Example
1981	The Look Of Elegance	Example	Example
1982	The Mood of Romance	Example	Example
1983	Fashion Extravaganza	Example	Example
1984	Color Fantasy	Example	Example
1985	Body Language	Example	Example
1986	Fashion Scandal	Example	Example
1987	Fashion Sizzle	Example	Example
1988	Fashion Seduction	Example	Example
1989	Fashion Magic	Example	Example
1990	Freedom Explosion	Example	Example
1991	Fashion With Passion	Example	Example
1992	Living the Fantasy	Example	Example
1993	The Rapture Of Fashion	Example	Example
1994	The Shining Hour Of Fashion	Example	Example
1995	The Power Of Color	Example	Example
1996	The Great Fashion Mix	Example	Example
1997	The Jazz Age Of Fashion	Example	Example
1998	Fashions to Love	Example	Example
1999	Fashions 2000	Example	Example
2000	Fashion Sensation	178	3
2001	The Changing Trends Of Fashion	Example	Example
2002	Simply Spectacular	Example	Example
2003	Color Splash	Example	Example
2004	Living It Up	Example	Example
2005	Fit To be Fabulous	Example	Example
2006	Stylishly Hot	Example	Example
2007	Glam Odyssey: A Fashion Journey Into Bliss & Beyond	Example	Example
2008	The Runway Report What's Hip, What's Hot, What's Now!	Example	Example

=== Fashion Fair Cosmetics ===
When Eunice Johnson noticed that the models at the Ebony Fashion Fair "were mixing foundations to create the right blend to match their hues", she initially approached existing cosmetics companies and asked them to develop make-up lines which would suit the specific needs of women of color. However, as she was met with resistance from the companies she approached, she and her husband, John H. Johnson, created the Capsule Collection, a small make-up compact in a mail-order package. Due to high-demand, the product led to the creation of a full cosmetic line named Fashion Fair Cosmetics, after the fashion show in 1973. According to Fortune, Fashion Fair Cosmetics was once the largest black-owned cosmetics company in the world. In April 2019, a United Kingdom creditor petitioned a judge to force the company to sell its Fashion Fair Cosmetics UK assets. In November 2019, the brand was acquired by Cheryl Mayberry McKissack and Desirée Rogers.

== Legacy ==
From March 2013 thru May 2014, the Chicago History Museum displayed an exhibition titled Inspiring Beauty: 50 Years Of Ebony Fashion Fair. The exhibition featured several ensembles featured in Fashion Fair shows during its half-century history. The exhibition traveled nationally beginning in fall 2014, with stops including the Museum of Design Atlanta and the Milwaukee Art Museum.

== See also ==
- Fashion Fair
- Gallery Int Fashion Fair
