= Jet (magazine) =

African-American weekly magazine

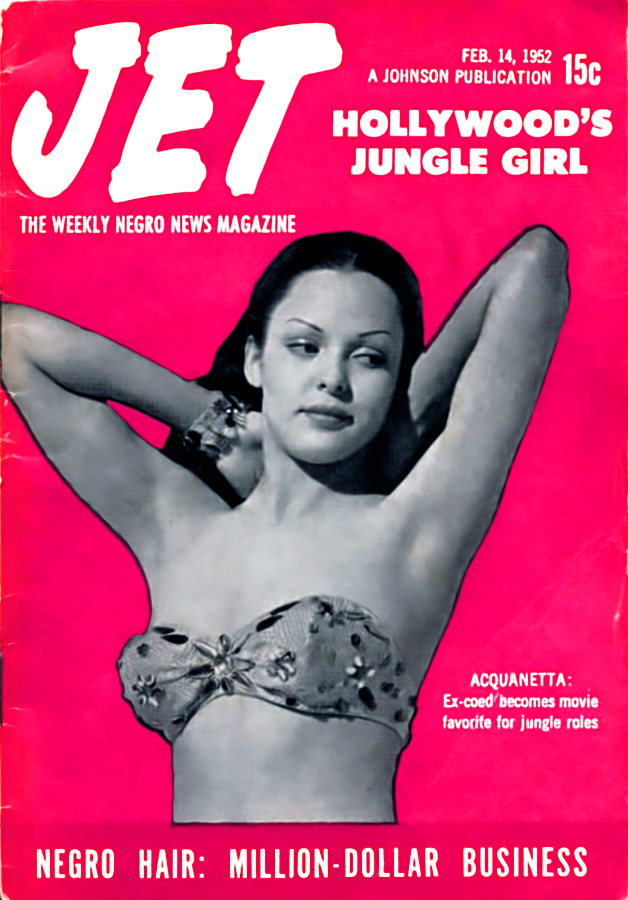
- February 14, 1952, cover with Acquanetta
- Former editors: Aldore Collier, Mitzi Miller, Mira Lowe, Sylvia P. Flanagan, Robert E. Johnson
- Categories: News magazine
- Frequency: online, formerly a print weekly
- Publisher: Ebony Media Operations, LLC (2016–present); Johnson Publishing Company (1951–2016)
- Total circulation: (June 2012) 1.1 million 720,000 (June, 2014)
- Founder: John H. Johnson
- First issue: November 1, 1951; 74 years ago
- Final issue: June 2014 (print) continuing in digital (2014)
- Country: United States
- Based in: Los Angeles, California, U.S.
- Language: English
- Website: jetmag.com
- ISSN: 0021-5996
- OCLC: 1781708

Jet is an American weekly digital magazine focusing on news, culture, and entertainment related to the African-American community. Founded in print by John H. Johnson in November 1951 in Chicago, Illinois, the magazine was billed as "The Weekly Negro News Magazine". As publisher, the Johnson Publishing Company created Jet magazine to offer Black Americans proper representation, noting under-representation of African Americans in the general media. Jet chronicled the civil rights movement from its earliest years, including the murder of Emmett Till, the Montgomery bus boycott, and the activities of civil rights leader Martin Luther King Jr.

Jet was printed from November 1, 1951, in digest-sized format in all or mostly black-and-white until its December 27, 1999, issue. In 2009, Jet expanded one of the weekly issues to a double issue published once each month. Johnson Publishing Company struggled with the same loss of circulation and advertising as other magazines and newspapers in the digital age, and the final print issue of Jet was published on June 23, 2014, continuing solely as a digital magazine app. In 2016, Johnson Publishing sold Jet and its sister publication Ebony to private equity firm Clear View Group. As of the date of sale, the publishing company is known as Ebony Media Corporation.

== History ==
=== Early history ===
The first issue of Jet was published on November 1, 1951, by John H. Johnson in Chicago, Illinois. Johnson called his magazine Jet because he wanted the name to symbolize "Black and speed". In Jet's first issue, Johnson wrote, "In the world today everything is moving along at a faster clip. There is more news and far less time to read it." Jet's goal was to provide "news coverage on happenings among Negroes all over the U.S.—in entertainment, politics, sports, social events as well as features on unusual personalities, places and events." Redd Foxx called the magazine "the Negro bible".

=== 1952–2014 ===
Jet was published as a sister zine to the Ebony magazine which Johnson published 6 years earlier in 1945. Jet became nationally known in 1955 for its shocking and graphic coverage of the murder of Emmett Till. Its popularity was enhanced by its continuing coverage of the burgeoning civil rights movement. The publication of Till's brutalized corpse within the September 22, 1955 issue inspired the black community to address racial violence, catalyzing the civil rights movement. Some of the popular models of Jet during this era included Vera Francis and Nancy Westbrook. The Johnson Publishing Company's campaign for economic, political and social justice influenced its inclusion of progressive views. From 1970 to 1975, Jet challenged conservative readers' anti-abortion stance by giving physicians who performed abortions a platform to discuss scientific facts about abortion procedures.

=== 2014–present ===
In May 2014, the publication announced the print edition would be discontinued and switch to a digital format in June.

==== Changes in ownership ====
In June 2016, after 71 years, Jet and its sister publication Ebony were sold by Johnson Publishing to Clear View Group, an Austin, Texas-based private equity firm, for an undisclosed amount but the sale did not include the photo archives. In July 2019, three months after Johnson Publishing filed for Chapter 7 Bankruptcy liquidation, it sold its historic Jet and Ebony photo archives to a consortium of foundations to be made available to the public.

In 2020, Ulysses "Junior" Bridgeman, a former NBA basketball player, became the new owner of Ebony Media's assets for $14 million in a bid out of a Houston bankruptcy court. Bridgeman placed a bid of $14 million to take ownership of the company. His sports and media group has hired Michele Ghee as Jet and Ebony magazine's new CEO.

== Content ==
Jet coverage includes: fashion and beauty tips, entertainment news, dating advice, political coverage, health tips, and diet guides, in addition to covering events such as fashion shows. The cover photo usually corresponds to the focus of the main story. Cover stories might be a celebrity's wedding, Mother's Day, or a recognition of the achievements of a notable African American.

=== Photography ===
Jet's uncensored and vivid photography made it influential in politics and entertainment. Jet took photos of Martin Luther King Jr. speaking and greeting fans, as well as detailed pictures of the subjects of the Entertainment section, including of Jimi Hendrix. The most famous picture taken and published by Jet was the remains of Emmett Till's face after his death in 1955.

=== Civil Movements ===
Similar to Essence, Jet routinely deplores racism in mainstream media, especially its negative depictions of black men and women. However, Hazell and Clarke report that between 2003 and 2004, Jet and Essence themselves ran advertising that was pervaded with racism and white supremacy. Jet has published colorist advertisements in the past. An advertisement for Nadinola, a bleaching cream, appeared in an issue published in 1955. It depicts a light-skinned woman as the center of men's attention. Amongst the Civil Rights movement of the 1950s, the Black is Beautiful Movement was also heavily covered within the 1960s through the glamorization of African women within multiple issues.

=== Beauty ===
==== Publication ====
Jet claims to give young female adults confidence and strength because the women featured therein are strong and successful without the help of a man. Since 1952, Jet has had a full-page feature called "Beauty of the Week". This feature includes a photograph of an African American woman in a swimsuit (either one-piece or two-piece, but never nude), along with her name, place of residence, profession, hobbies, and interests. Many of the women are not professional models and submit their photographs for the magazine's consideration. In 2024, The New Yorker wrote that Jet's "Beauties of the Week" column "democratized the thirst trap."

==== Representation ====
During the time period when these issues were first being published, 'beauty' had a very Western-centric image. Jet however, provided African American women with a platform to boast their own image of self-confidence and illustrate better representation of African Americans in the media. An issue posted through Xavier University writes "The Eurocentric standard of beauty only tolerates straight hair, especially on Black women who have a natural kinky hair texture". While within the course of the 50's there were societal confines of lighter skinned models with straight hair, there are notable early issues of Jet that spotlight African women with changeless hair, paving the way for Jet to have its reputation of rebellion and boldness that it does today.

=== Census ===
In many issues of Jet there is a section of content titled census. This provides the reader with insight into the fluctuating number of people within the population that the magazine caters to. Congress representatives, artists, and other figures who pass away are all illustrated under this section, as well as their reputations and contributions to society.

== Notable people ==
- Robert C. Farrell (born 1936), journalist and member of the Los Angeles City Council, 1974–91, Jet correspondent
- Robert E. Johnson (born August 13, 1922, in Montgomery, Alabama; died January, 1996, in Chicago) was associate publisher and executive editor of Jet. He joined the Jet staff in February 1953, two years after it was founded by publisher John H. Johnson. He was one of the longest serving editors of Jet.

== Awards and recognition ==
- Jet was rated No. 1 as the acme in news digesting for the Baltimore Afro-American newspaper on November 17, 1951.
