= Ebony (magazine) =

American lifestyle magazine

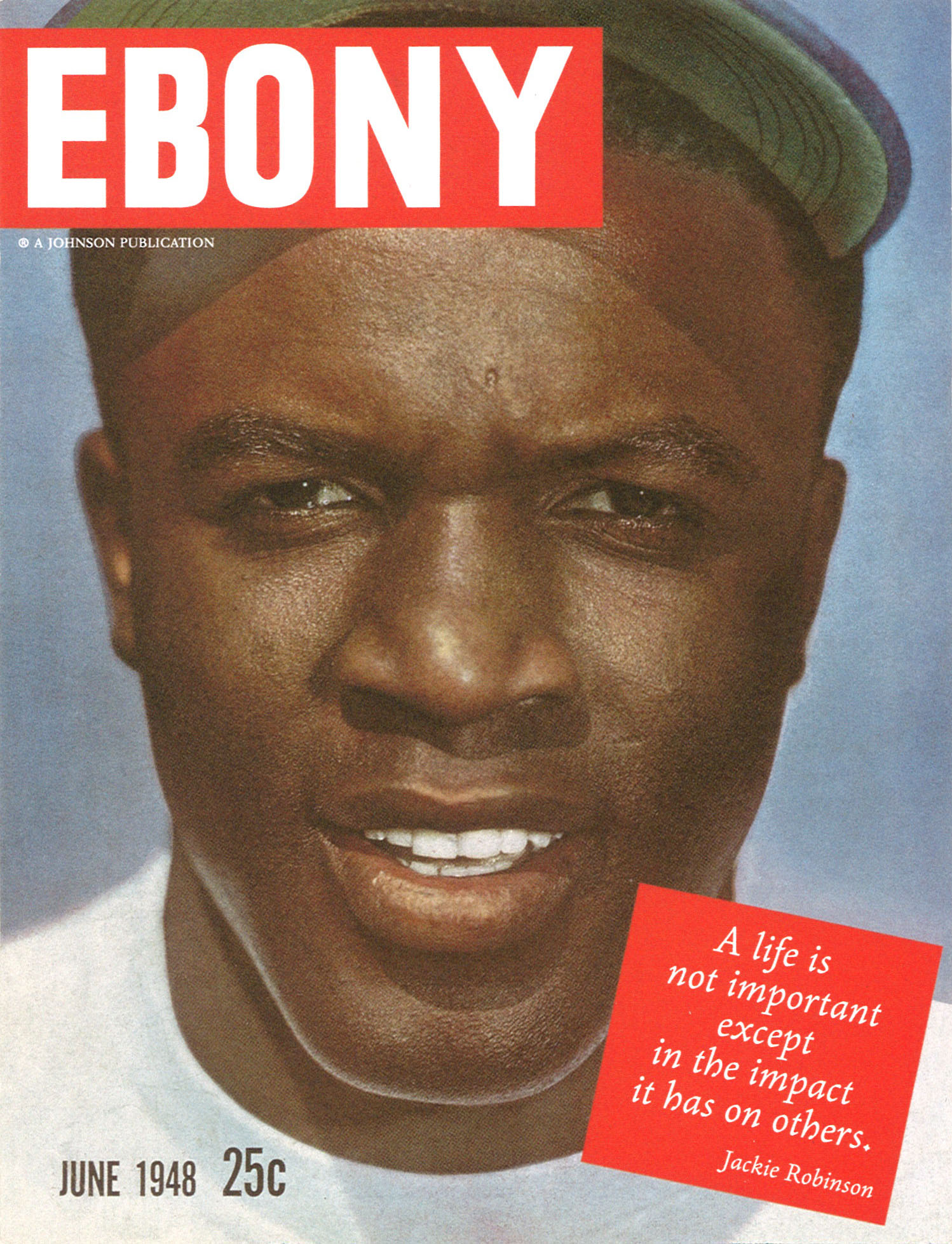
- June 1948 cover featuring Jackie Robinson
- Former editors: Aldore Collier; Tracey Ferguson; Kyra Kyles; Kierna Mayo; Amy DuBois Barnett; Bryan Monroe
- Categories: Lifestyle magazine
- Frequency: Monthly
- Total circulation: 1,333,421 (2017)
- Founder: John H. Johnson
- First issue: November 1, 1945; 80 years ago
- Company: Ebony Media Operations, LLC (2016–present); Johnson Publishing Company (1945–2016)
- Country: United States
- Based in: Louisville, Kentucky, U.S. (2020–present); Los Angeles, California, U.S. (2017–2020); Chicago, Illinois, U.S. (1945–2017)
- Language: English
- Website: www.ebony.com
- ISSN: 0012-9011
- OCLC: 1567306

Ebony is a monthly American lifestyle magazine that focuses on the lifestyles and accomplishments of influential black people, fashion, beauty, and politics.

Ebony was founded in Chicago in 1945 by John H. Johnson, for his Johnson Publishing Company. He sought to address African-American issues, personalities and interests in a positive and self-affirming manner. Its cover photography typically showcases African-American public figures, including entertainers and politicians, such as Dorothy Dandridge, Lena Horne, Diana Ross, Michael Jackson, former U.S. senator Carol Moseley Braun of Illinois, U.S. first lady Michelle Obama, Beyoncé, Tyrese Gibson, and Tyler Perry. Each year, Ebony selects the "100 Most Influential Blacks in America".

After 71 years, in June 2016, Johnson Publishing sold both Ebony and Jet, another Johnson publication, to a private equity firm called Clear View Group. The new publisher is known as Ebony Media Corporation. After the publication went bankrupt in July 2020, it was purchased for $14 million by Junior Bridgeman in December 2020.

== History ==
=== 1945–1969 ===
Ebony was founded by John H. Johnson in 1945. It was named by Johnson's wife, Eunice Walker Johnson, thinking of the dark wood. It was patterned on the format of the magazine Life. Ebony published its first issue on November 1, 1945, with an initial press run of 25,000 copies that sold out completely. Ebony's earlier content focused on African-American sports and entertainment figures, but began including black achievers and celebrities of different professions.

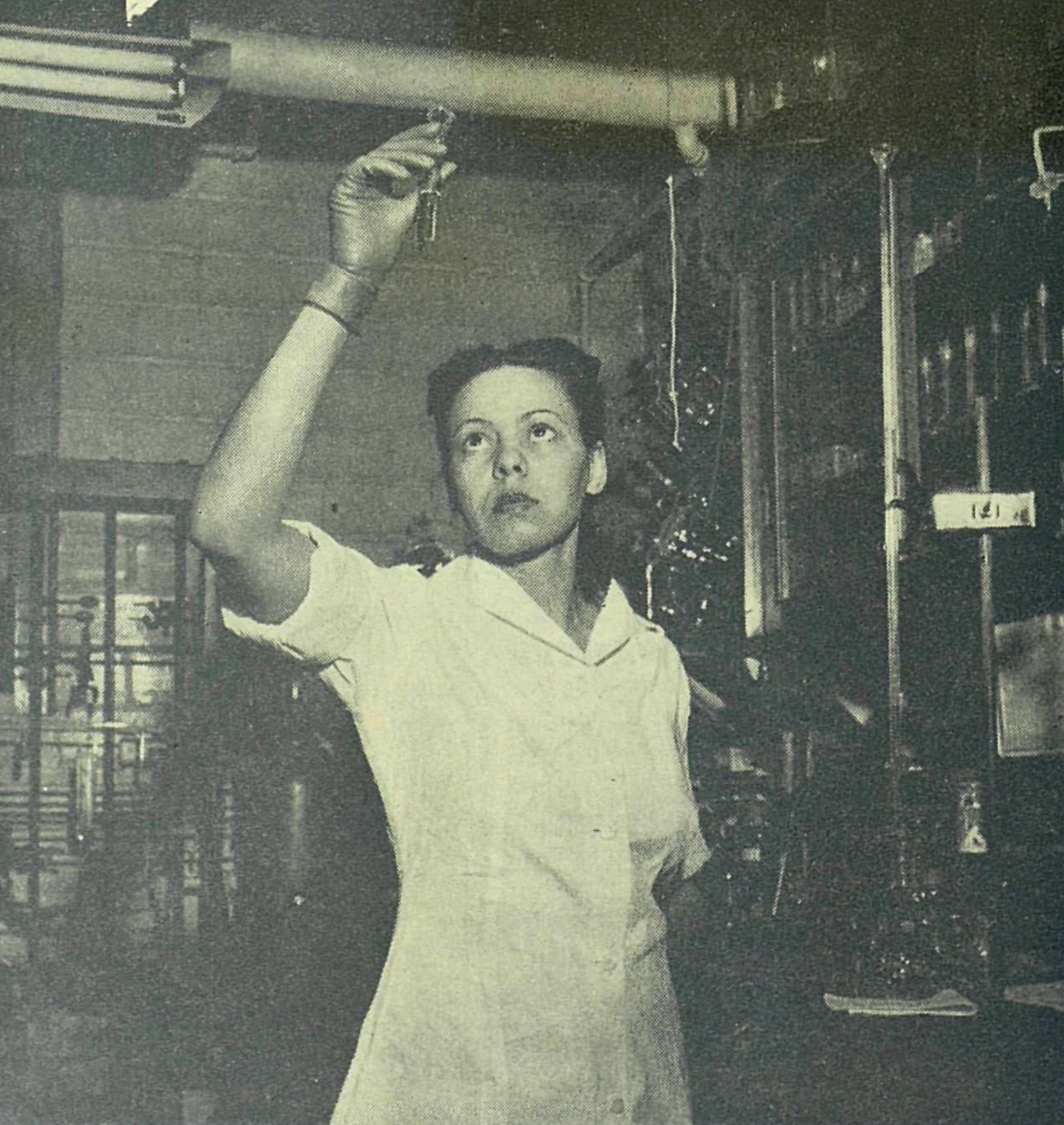
Blanche J. Lawrence, "Atom Scientists", Ebony, September 1949

The editors wrote in the first issue:

We like to look at the zesty side of life. Sure, you can get all hot and bothered about the race question (and don't think we don't), but not enough is said about all the swell things we Negroes can do and will accomplish. Ebony will try to mirror the happier side of Negro life – the positive, everyday achievements from Harlem to Hollywood. But when we talk about race as the No. 1 problem of America, we'll talk turkey.

During the 1960s, Ebony increasingly covered the civil rights movement. Articles were published about political events happening all over the U.S. where activists protested racial violence and advocated for increasing social mobility for African Americans across the diaspora. Also published was content about the Black Power movement. In 1965, executive editor Lerone Bennett Jr. wrote a recurring column entitled "Black Power", which featured an in-depth profile of Stokely Carmichael in 1966. Ebony also commemorated historical events that contributed to black citizenship and freedom such as the September 1963 issue that honored the 100th anniversary of the Emancipation Proclamation.

=== 1969–1985 ===
Ebony's design and content began to shift in the late–1960s and early–1970s. A new level of competition for subscribers and readers began during the 1970s. Due to the emergence of new African-American oriented magazines such as Essence, Ebony began to cover more political activism and achievements in the 1970s. The February 1971 cover featured 13 black congressmen and women. Ebony highlighted the black professionals serving in Jimmy Carter's administration in the March 1977 issue.

=== 1985–2005 ===
Ebony reached unprecedented levels of popularity, with marketers estimating that Ebony reached more than 40% of the African-American adults in the United States during the 1980s, a feat unmatched by any other general–interest magazine at the time. Beginning in the mid-1970s, advertisers created customized ads which featured African-American models using their products. In 1985, Ebony Man, a monthly men's magazine was created, printing the first issue in September 1985. By Ebony's 40th anniversary in November 1985, it had a circulation of 1.7 million.

=== 2005–present ===
In December 2008, Google announced that it was scanning back issues for Google Book Search. As of that date, all issues from November 1959 to December 2008 were made available free.

In 2010, the Johnson Publishing Company sold its historic building at 820 S. Michigan Avenue in Chicago's South Loop to Columbia College Chicago. The same year, Ebony was redesigned to update its longtime brand. In the past, Ebony was persistently upbeat, much like its postwar contemporary Life. However, in the 21st century, Ebony featured more controversial content.

The November 2011 cover featured a pregnant Nia Long, reminiscent of the iconic image of actress Demi Moore portrayed naked while pregnant on a major magazine cover two decades before. Some of Ebony′s more conservative readers objected to the cover, stating it was inappropriate to feature an unwed, pregnant woman on the cover. The cover made national headlines in US Weekly and in a five-minute segment on CNN. More recent issues questioned whether President Obama was still right for black America and whether biracial Americans need more acknowledgment in society.

In May 2016, Johnson Publishing, the family business that founded Ebony and Jet, sold both publications to Texas-based private equity firm CVG Group for an undisclosed price. Under CVG's ownership, Ebony struggled to find its footing, culminating in its 2017 move to lay off a third of its staff and move editorial operations to Los Angeles.

In 2018, Ebony's publishing schedule was changed from being published monthly to a double issue published once each month. On May 24, 2019, CVG suspended the print edition, with the Spring 2019 issue the last to be printed. Johnson Publishing filed for bankruptcy protections that same year. In December 2020, Milwaukee Bucks alum and Black businessman Junior Bridgeman bought Ebony and Jet for $14 million from CVG. Under Bridgeman, the publication stated its intention to pivot toward themes of financial literacy and building Black wealth. In March 2021, Ebony relaunched in a digital format. In June 2024, it returned to Chicago for its Juneteenth celebration at Soho House.

== Notable coverage ==
=== 100 Most Influential Blacks ===
One of the most famous aspects Ebony was its list of "100 Most Influential Blacks". This list—which began in 1963, took a hiatus until 1971, and has continued on ever since—lists those who have made the greatest impact in the African-American community during the year. Most of those listed were well-educated, with 55 percent having completed a graduate degree. However, some researchers have noted that black scholars, teachers, and higher-education administrators are rarely, if ever, included on the list. The list exclusively focuses on entertainment figures, politicians, philanthropists, and entrepreneurs.

The May 2001 "100+ Most Influential Black Americans" issue did not include a number of influential African Americans such as Thomas Sowell, Shelby Steele, Armstrong Williams, Walter Williams and, most notably, Supreme Court Justice Clarence Thomas. The Economist described the exclusion of Justice Thomas from the list as spiteful.

=== Coolest Black Family in America ===
In 2018, Ebony published a series highlighting Black families from across the United States with the intention of showcasing Black family dynamics.

=== 25 Coolest Brothers of All Time ===
In August 2008, Ebony had published a special eight-cover edition featuring the "25 Coolest Brothers of All Time". The lineup featured popular figures like Jay-Z, Barack Obama, Prince, Samuel L. Jackson, Denzel Washington, Marvin Gaye, Muhammad Ali and Billy Dee Williams.

=== 65th-anniversary edition ===
In November 2010, Ebony featured a special 65th-anniversary edition cover featuring Taraji P. Henson, Samuel L. Jackson, Usher and Mary J. Blige. The issue included eight cover recreations from historic and iconic previous covers of Ebony. Blair Underwood posed inside, as did Omar Epps and Jurnee Smollett. National Public Radio marked this anniversary edition as the beginning of redesign of Ebony. Former White House social secretary Desiree Rogers, of the Obama administration, had become the chief executive officer.

== Ownership ==
In 2016, Johnson Publishing Company sold Ebony along with Jet to private equity firm Clear View Group. In May 2017, the editorial staff moved from Chicago to Los Angeles along with the editorial staff for Jet magazine. In December 2020, Ebony and its sister publication Jet were purchased for $14 million by Junior Bridgeman.

== Ensuing financial difficulties ==
In July 2019, three months after Johnson Publishing Company filed for Chapter 7 Bankruptcy liquidation, it sold its historic photo archives including the prints and negatives to a consortium of foundations to be made available to the public. After suspending the print edition in May 2019, Clear View Group and Ebony Media Operations laid off the majority of the editing staff in June 2019.

=== Lawsuits ===
In 2017, 50 freelance writers created a social media campaign #EbonyOwes due to not being paid by the owner, Clear View Group. In response to the campaign, Clear View Group made an effort to pay 11 of the 50 writers $18,000, ending with only three being paid in full. In late 2017, the remaining writers with the help of The National Writers Union filed suit against Clear View Group and Ebony Media Operations.

The remaining writers settled their lawsuit with the company in February 2018. The Ebony owners were ordered to pay $80,000. Ebony Media Operations, Clear View Group and the National Writers Union agreed that all unpaid invoices would be paid over four quarterly installments by the end of 2018. In October 2018, the Ebony owner missed its third quarter payment and another lawsuit was filed in November 2018. Clear View Group made the final payment to the writers in December 2018.

== See also ==
- Essence
- Jet
