= For Freedoms =

American political action committee

- Founded: 2016
- Founders: Hank Willis Thomas, Eric Gottesman, Michelle Woo, and Wyatt Gallery
- Headquarters: New York, New York, United States
- Website: forfreedoms.org

For Freedoms is an artist-run platform for civic engagement, discourse, and direct action for artists in the United States. Co-founded by Hank Willis Thomas, Eric Gottesman, Michelle Woo, and Wyatt Gallery in 2016, For Freedoms has partnered with US-based institutions and artists for activations including town halls, exhibitions and installations, public programs, billboard campaigns, and artist residencies. In June 2018, For Freedoms launched the 50 State Initiative, described as the "largest-ever public art project in the US".

== History ==
=== Founding ===
Co-founded in 2016 by Hank Willis Thomas, a photographer and conceptual artist, and Eric Gottesman, a visual artist and teacher, Michelle Woo, a cultural producer, and Wyatt Gallery, a photographer. For Freedoms was inspired by Norman Rockwell's paintings of Franklin D. Roosevelt's "Four Freedoms" wartime address in 1941—a call to safeguard the freedom of speech, freedom of worship, freedom from want, and freedom from fear. In January 2016, For Freedoms was registered as the first artist-run political action committee and began raising money for national advertising through the artistic collaboration Postcards from America, a project of Magnum Foundation artists Jim Goldberg, Gilles Peress, and Alec Soth. The Postcards from America photographs, as well as works from Carrie Mae Weems, Rashid Johnson, Xaviera Simmons, Bayeté Ross Smith, Fred Tomaselli, and Marilyn Minter, were exhibited at Jack Shainman Gallery in the summer of 2016. In July of that year, outside of For Freedoms headquarters, a flag by Dread Scott was added to the show, drawing immense attention. Displayed outside the gallery in Manhattan on the week of the deaths of Philando Castile and Alton Sterling, Scott sparked national conversation about police brutality by reinterpreting the early 1900s NAACP flag "A Man Was Lynched Yesterday", updating it to read "A Man Was Lynched By Police Yesterday".

=== 2016 billboard campaign ===
For Freedoms released a national billboard campaign a month before Donald Trump's election in October 2016. The organization commissioned artists for billboards in Denver, Colorado; Flint, Michigan; Columbus, Ohio; Lexington, Kentucky; Memphis, Tennessee; Pearl, Mississippi; New Orleans, Louisiana; Tallahassee, Florida; Harrisburg, Pennsylvania; as well as billboards in November in Miami, Florida and Cleveland, Ohio. The billboard in Pearl, Mississippi—which superimposed Donald Trump's campaign slogan, "Make America Great Again" over Spider Martin's image Two Minute Warning of Bloody Sunday—incited local and national controversy. Then-governor Phil Bryant called the billboard imagery "reprehensible", and Pearl mayor Brad Rogers vied to have the billboard taken down, an action which raised questions over First Amendment rights.

=== 2017 to 2018 ===
The initiative held residency at MoMA PS1 for the first 100 days of the Trump administration. Laboratory for Freedoms was an activation space for public meetings, town halls, and performances. That summer, For Freedoms held an artist's workshop for MoMA and curated Aperture Foundation's Summer Open exhibition On Freedom. As well, the group continued doing town halls and billboards in collaboration with Museum of Contemporary Art, Cleveland and Museum of Fine Arts, Boston.

In 2017, For Freedoms Federation, LLC was created to engage with educational partners in order to activate the cultural infrastructure of the country in the pursuit of social change. For Freedoms Federation acts as a hub for other artists, arts institutions, and activists who want to be more engaged with the current political system in all of the fifty states and Puerto Rico with the stated aim of making democracy more transparent and responsive. In 2018, all For Freedoms activation began operating under the federation as opposed to the PAC.

=== 50 State Initiative ===
In 2018, For Freedoms launched the 50 State Initiative, the largest creative collaboration in U.S. history. In the fall of 2018, For Freedoms launched a major billboard campaign in every state ahead of the 2016 November midterm congressional election. The project was meant to inspire more people to participate in civic life and broadening the concept of what democratic participation looks like. To realize the hugely ambitious project, For Freedoms partnered with more than 200 American art organizations, from grassroots art centers to major museums, and even international groups and funded the project through Kickstarter. The campaign included over 150 contemporary artists, including Marilyn Minter, Rashid Johnson, Guerrilla Girls, and Theaster Gates, among others.

=== Four Freedoms photographs ===
In October 2018, For Freedoms also launched a photo campaign entitled Four Freedoms. In collaboration with photographers Emily Shur and Wyatt Gallery, Hank Willis Thomas and For Freedoms transformed Norman Rockwell's depictions of President Franklin Delano Roosevelt's 1941 address to Congress, which articulated FDR's vision of the four basic human freedoms. Thomas wrote that "The image haunted me because of the world we live in. I wanted to imagine what it would look like today." Through dozens of iterations of Rockwell's original four paintings, the 82 images in the campaign attempted to reflect the immeasurable diversity of American identities today. Celebrities such as Rosario Dawson, Dolores Huerta, Gina Belafonte, Van Jones, Jesse Williams, Robert A. Nakamura and Karen L. Ishizuka, Kiran Gandhi, Michael Ealy, Saul Williams, Rodney Barnette, and others were included in the reinterpretations. The new version of the images were widely shared on social media and Instagram, including by celebrities such as Alicia Keys and Jada Pinkett-Smith.

The modernization of the Freedom of Worship image was featured on the November 26, 2018, cover of Time magazine along with the question "Who Gets To Be American?"

=== 2020 Awakening ===
In fall 2020, For Freedoms announced the 2020 Awakening campaign centered around the new four freedoms of awakening listening, healing, and justice. The campaign, inspired by the 1860s youth-led organization which championed the election of Abraham Lincoln, the Wide Awakes, features billboards as well as digital advertising spaces. Among the artists who planned to participate in the 2020 Awakening campaign included Christine Sun Kim, the Guerrilla Girls, Alfredo Jaar, Edgar Heap of Birds, Kameelah Janan Rasheed, Marilyn Minter, and Carlos Motta, as well as curators Jasmine Wahi and Rujeko Hockley. An accompanying digital publication, the Infinite Playbook, outlines how individuals and institutions participate in collective action to increase voter engagement and build a cultural and political identity around listening, healing, and justice.

== Selected For Freedoms artists ==
For Freedoms has worked with more than 800 artists working in the United States. Some For Freedoms artists include:

- Adam Pendleton
- Adriana Corral
- Africa's Out!
- Ai Weiwei
- Alec Soth
- Aida Muluneh
- Andres Serrano
- Awol Erizku
- Bayeté Ross Smith
- Carlos Motta
- Carrie Mae Weems
- Cassils
- Cheryl Pope
- Christine Sun Kim
- Christopher Myers
- David Birkin
- David Byrne
- Deborah Kass
- Deborah Willis
- Demian DinéYazhi'
- Derek Eley
- Derrick Adams
- Dread Scott
- Emma Sulkowicz
- Fred Tomaselli
- Jim Goldberg
- Kameelah Janan Rasheed
- Marilyn Minter
- Mickalene Thomas
- Rashid Johnson
- Trevor Paglen
- Xaviera Simmons
- Zoë Buckman

== Activations ==
A For Freedoms activation is typically a billboard, exhibition, or an artist-led town hall, though activations have also taken the form of public programs, installations, bus stop benches, public meetings, advertisements, and lawn signs.

=== 2018 ===
- Margin and Center, Houston Center for Photography, Fotofest Biennial, Houston, TX
- Into Action, Los Angeles, CA

=== 2017 ===
- Freedom from Want, MOCA Cleveland Town Hall Residency, Cleveland, OH
- Where Do We Go From Here, Boston, MA
- The Artifice of Drawn Borders, Town Hall, Museum of Fine Arts, Boston, Boston, MA
- Freedom From Fear, MOCA Cleveland Town Hall Residency, Cleveland, OH
- Art and Practice with For Freedoms, MoMA Workshop, MoMA PS1, New York, NY
- On Freedom, Aperture Foundation, New York, NY
- Collective Thinking, Aperture Foundation, New York, NY
- Laboratory for Freedom, MoMA PS1, New York, NY

=== 2016 ===
- Freedom From Want, Town Hall, Mistake Room, Los Angeles, CA
- Four Freedoms, Town Hall, Museum of Contemporary Art, Cleveland, Cleveland, OH
- Dispatches, Southeastern Center for Contemporary Art, Winston-Salem, NC
- For Freedoms Billboard Campaign, Denver CO; Flint, MI; Columbus, OH; Lexington, KY; Memphis, TN; Pearl, MS; New Orleans, LA; Tallahassee, FL; Harrisburg, PA; Cleveland, OH; Miami, FL
- Freedom from Fear, Town Hall, The Mistake Room with Neuehouse, Los Angeles, CA
- Freedom of Speech, Town Hall, International Center for Photography, New York, NY
- Freedom from Worship, Town Hall, The Mistake Room, Los Angeles, CA
- For Freedoms Benches, Chicago, NY
- Take Aim, Neuehouse and Westside Rifle & Pistol Range, New York, NY
- Murals at Afropunk Festival, Brooklyn, NY
- For Freedoms, Inaugural Exhibitions, Jack Shainman Gallery, New York, NY

== Awards ==
- Featured in Artsy's 2018 Year in Visual Culture for mounting "the largest collaborative creative project in U.S. history."
- For Freedoms was awarded the 2017 Infinity Award for Online Platform and New Media by International Center for Photography.
