= Museum of Broken Windows =

Pop-up exhibition in New York City

Coordinates: 40.72957°N 73.99044°W

- Established: September 22–30, 2018; September 13 - October 8, 2019
- Location: Cooper Union Foundation Building, 41 Cooper Square, 7 E 7th St, New York, NY 10003, USA
- Type: Art exhibition
- Owner: New York Civil Liberties Union
- Website: www.museumofbrokenwindows.org

The Museum of Broken Windows is a pop-up exhibition organized by the New York State affiliate of the American Civil Liberties Union. Housed within the Cooper Union's Foundation Building on Cooper Square, the project has been displayed twice, first from September 22 through 30, 2018, and then between September 13 and October 8, 2019.

The exhibition features artwork that explores the historic tactics utilized by the NYPD and their eventual consequences in terms of racial injustice and police brutality, focusing primarily on the namesake broken windows theory of crime.

== Background ==
The Broken Windows theory is a criminological theory that was first introduced by social scientists James Q. Wilson and George L. Kelling in a 1982 issue of The Atlantic Monthly, in which they argue that areas exhibiting visible evidence of anti-social behavior such as graffiti and vandalism act as catalysts for the occurrence of more serious crimes. Despite the fact that there is still debate in regards to the relationship between crime reduction and the policing policies inspired by the hypothesis, the theory was later applied in numerous locations around the United States, most notably in New York City following the 1993 election of Mayor Rudy Giuliani. Along with incumbent police commissioner William J. Bratton, Giuliani promoted the use of "broken windows policing" across the city by enforcing stricter policing on minor crimes and the introduction of policies such as the controversial "stop-and-frisk" program which allowed for the temporary detainment and searching of an individual based upon a reasonable suspicion that they are involved in a criminal activity.

In 2019 there were nearly 13,500 reported stops with around 90% of them being African-American or Latino. The stop-and-frisk policy therefore faced accusations of racism as further research suggested that white people were stopped significantly less than other races, resulting in a "wall of distrust" between minorities and the police.

As a defender for the civil rights and liberties of New Yorkers, the New York Civil Liberties Union established the museum and funded the project with the intention of exposing the "ineffectiveness of broken windows policing, which criminalizes our most vulnerable communities".

== Works ==
The exhibit features roughly 60 selected works from 30 artists, activists and authors that draw attention to the long-lasting impact of the broken windows theory on marginalized communities. At the entrance, a sculpture by Jordan Weber shows a destroyed police car with plants growing through the broken windshield in soil taken from the burial site of Michael Brown. Brown was an unarmed 18 year old black man whose fatal shooting by Ferguson police resulted in the 2014 Ferguson riots. The plants in the exhibit were chosen specifically as a reference to the death of Eric Garner through a prohibited police chokehold. Garner's death was also the principal inspiration for Molly Crabapple's animated short "Broken Windows" which also appeared at the exhibition.

Ann Lewis produced a 20 ft installation called "...and counting" that features 1093 mortuary toe tags dangling from the roof to represent all the victims of police-related deaths in the US during 2016. Each individual tag was written by hand.

Other exhibits include a self portrait painted by Philadelphia artist Russell Craig on a canvas covered in his court documents after being imprisoned for seven years as a result of non-violent drug offenses, as well as Michael D'Antuono's "The Talk", which focuses on the racial profiling of African Americans by police.

As well as holding original art, the museum features newspaper clippings, personal mementos, and photos from the period where broken windows policing was utilized.

== Selected contributors ==
- Molly Crabapple
- Russell Craig
- Michael D'Antuono
- Baz Dreisinger
- Jeff Gipe
- Tracey Hetzel
- Ann Lewis
- DeRay Mckesson
- Dread Scott
- Keila Strong
- Hank Willis Thomas
- Cleo Wade
- Jordan Weber
- The Soze Agency

-Source:
