= Chris Johnson (artist) =

American photographer (born 1948)

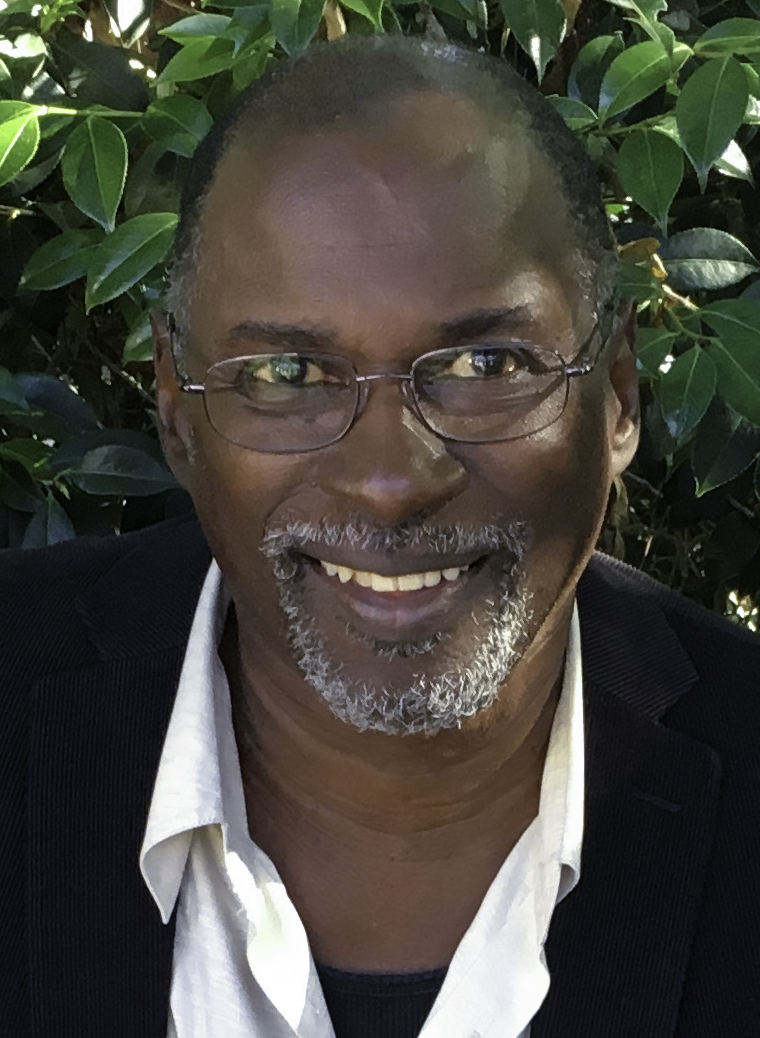
- Born: Christopher D. Johnson; November 22, 1948 (age 77); Brooklyn, New York
- Known for: Photography and video
- Notable work: Question Bridge: Black Males
- Awards: International Center of Photography, Infinity Award: New Media; 2015 Question Bridge: Black Males
- Website: www.chrisjohnsonphotographer.com

Chris Johnson (born 1948) is an American fine art photographer, educator, author, curator, video and installation artist working primarily with themes related to personal history, chance operations and social justice. He is a professor emeritus of photography at the California College of the Arts. His photographic work has been shown in a solo exhibition at Monterey Museum of Art. Johnson's video work in collaboration with the Question Bridge team has been exhibited at Oakland Museum of California, Brooklyn Museum and Portland Art Museum.

== Career ==
Johnson is a professor emeritus of photography at the California College of the Arts where for 11 years he served as chair of the Photography Program. He has been president of the Board of SF Camerawork, director of the Mother Jones International Fund for Documentary Photography, and chair of the City of Oakland's Cultural Affairs Commission. Johnson is a member of the Board of Trustees of the Oakland Museum of California and is President of the Board of The Alliance for Media Arts and Culture.

Johnson is the author of The Practical Zone System: for Film and Digital Photography (1999); currently in its sixth edition. His public art works and projects are included in Art as Social Practice: Technologies for Change (Routledge, 2022).

In 2025 The California College of the Arts conferred upon Chris Johnson an Honorary Doctorate in Fine Arts

=== The Question Bridge project ===
The original Question Bridge project emerged when, in 1996, Johnson was commissioned by the Museum of Photographic Arts in San Diego to produce a video piece as part of a multi-media exhibition entitled Re:Public curated by Richard Bolton. The result was a rough experimental project intended to show how video-mediated questions and answers might provide fresh insights into familiar concepts like "race" and "class" when this approach is applied to people who nominally belong to the same racial demographic.

==== Question Bridge: Black Males ====
In collaboration with artists Hank Willis Thomas, Kamal Sinclair and Bayeté Ross Smith, Question Bridge: Black Males is a five-channel video installation platform for black men of all ages and backgrounds to ask and candidly respond to questions that are rarely discussed in public. Through video-mediated question-and-answer exchange, diverse members of this "demographic" bridge economic, political, geographic, and generational divisions. The Question Bridge campaign seeks to represent and redefine Black male identity in America.

A book of essays titled Question Bridge: Black Males in America was published by Aperture in 2015. The exhibit, which was named by Artnet as among 100 artworks that defined the decade, toured to more than thirty organizations.

== Exhibitions ==
=== Solo photography exhibitions ===
- In My Life: Portraits by Chris Johnson, Monterey Museum of Art, 2022

=== Group photography exhibitions ===
- Reflections in Black: Art and Activism, African American Photographs from the Smithsonian Institution, curated by Deborah Willis, The Luckman Gallery, California State University, Los Angeles, 2002 and toured

=== Question Bridge exhibitions ===
- Question Bridge: Black Males, Brooklyn Museum, Brooklyn, New York City, 2012; Portland Art Museum, Portland, Oregon, 2019/20; Oakland Museum of California, Oakland, California, 2012; Harvey Gantt Center, Charlotte, NC; Corcoran Gallery of Art, Washington DC

== Awards ==
- 2015: International Center of Photography, Infinity Award: New Media for Question Bridge: Black Males

== Collections ==
Johnson's work is held in the following permanent collections:

- Brooklyn Museum, Brooklyn, New York City: a DVD and hard drive from Question Bridge: Black Males (as of 25 October 2022)
- Center for Creative Photography, at the University of Arizona: unspecified
- Museum of Fine Arts, Houston: 1 print (as of 1 November 2022)
- Oakland Museum of California, Oakland California: Question Bridge: Black Males (as of 1 November 2022)
