= Carla Williams =

Carla Williams may refer to:

- Carla Williams (photographer) (born 1965), American photographer
- Carla Williams (athletic director) (active since 2000), Virginia Cavaliers athletic director
- Carla Williams (netball) (born 1983), Jamaican netball player
- Carla Williams, fictional character in the 2004 American miniseries 10.5
- Carla Marie Williams (active since 2006), British songwriter, producer and singer
