= D'Antuono =

D'Antuono is a surname. Notable people with this name include the following:

- Francesca Romana D'Antuono (born 1980s), Italian politician
- Michael D'Antuono (born 20th century), American artist
- Steven M. D'Antuono Notable FBI Agent
