= Coreen Simpson =

American photographer and jewelry designer

- Born: February 18, 1942 (age 84); New York City, New York, U.S.
- Occupations: Photographer; Jewelry designer
- Years active: early 1980s-present

Coreen Simpson (born February 18, 1942) is a noted African-American photographer and jewelry designer, whose work has an African-American theme.

== Early life and education ==
Simpson was born in Brooklyn and was raised along with her brother by a foster family in Brooklyn. She completed Samuel J. Tilden High School in Brooklyn. She took courses at the Fashion Institute of Technology and Parsons School of Design, and studied with Frank Stewart, Studio Museum in Harlem in 1977.

== Career ==
Simpson's career launched when she became editor for Unique New York magazine in 1980, and she began photographing to illustrate her articles. She then became a freelance fashion photographer for the Village Voice and the Amsterdam News in the early 1980s, and covered many African-American cultural and political events in the mid-1980s. She is also noted for her studies of Harlem nightlife. She constructed a portable studio and brought it to clubs in downtown Manhattan, barbershops in Harlem, and braiding salons in Queens. Her work's ability to present a wide variety of subjects with "depth of character and dignity" has been compared to that of Diane Arbus and Weegee.

Simpson's work was included in the 2025 exhibition Photography and the Black Arts Movement, 1955–1985 at the National Gallery of Art.

== The Black Cameo ==
In addition to her photography, Simpson also designed jewelry. Her most notable jewelry collection is known as The Black Cameo (1990). The collection reintroduces the ancient tradition of cameos, but features portraits of black women. The portraits show the great variety of features of black women. Simpson’s goal was that every black women would be able to identify with the portraits within her cameo jewelry. Customers of the Black Cameo collection included Ruby Dee and Oprah Winfrey.

Simpson and Avon Products entered a joint venture in 1993 and created the Coreen Simpson Regal Beauty Collection, a budget line of designs which included a moderately-priced African American cameo.

Simpson resides in New York City.

== Collections ==
Simpson's works have been collected by the Museum of Modern Art, the Bronx Museum of the Arts, the Musee de la Photographie in Belgium, the Schomburg Center for Research in Black Culture, the International Center for Photography, the Harlem State Office, and the James Van Der Zee Institute.

== Selected exhibitions ==
- 1979: Corner Gallery, Brooklyn Museum, Brooklyn, NY
- 1998: Bronx Museum of the Arts, Bronx, NY
- 1998: International Center of Photography, New York, NY
- 1998: Musée de la Photographie, Brussels, Belgium
- 1999: Schomburg Center for Research in Black Culture, New York, NY
- 2000: Anacostia Community Museum, Washington, DC
- 2001: Bronx Museum of the Arts, Bronx, NY
- 2001: Brooklyn Museum, Brooklyn, NY

== Awards ==
- 1987: Light Work Residency
- Nueva Luz, Volume 1#2
- 1994: The Mary McLeod Bethune Award from the National Council of Negro Women
- 2000: The Madame C.J. Walker Award
- 2006: The National Council of Negro Women "Legend's Award"

== Bibliography ==
- Jeanne Moutoussamy-Ashe, Black Women Photographers, Writers & Readers, 1993
- Coreen Simpson, Black Women in America, MacMillan, 1999
- Coreen Simpson. Edited by Sarah Lewis, Leigh Raiford, and Deborah Willis. Coreen Simpson: A Monograph, 2025. ISBN 978-1-597-11585-8
