= Zoë Buckman =

British artist and photographer

- Born: 13 September 1985 (age 41); London, England
- Occupations: Visual artist, writer
- Spouse: David Schwimmer (m. 2010; div. 2017)
- Children: 1
- Website: zoebuckman.com

Zoë Buckman (born 13 September 1985) is an English artist, photographer and writer.

== Early life ==
Buckman was born in Hackney, East London, England, in the United Kingdom, to Jewish parents Jennie Buckman, an acting teacher and playwright, and Nick Blatchley, a government health official. Her uncle is Peter Buckman, an English writer and literary agent.

== Artwork ==
=== Heavy Rag ===
Heavy Rag examines the dichotomy of boxing, a sport in which gloves are used to harm, as well as for protection. The body of work was Buckman's first exhibition to open since her mother's death, and was greatly inspired by Louise Bourgeois’ textile works. Although the themes in this exhibition are not very celebratory, the colorful and warm fabrics that Buckman uses throughout her punching bags, glove clusters and flatworks, remind her of her mother and grandmother.

=== Present Life ===
Present Life examines the temporary nature and beauty of life from the focal-point of the exhibit, Buckman's plastinated placenta. After the birth of Buckman's daughter, Cleo, Buckman was informed that her placenta had deteriorated and could have caused the premature death of her child had she not been born. Buckman preserved her placenta through plastination and used the experience to inform her Present Life art series. In the series, Buckman's plastinated placenta is shown encased in marble.

=== Every Curve ===
Every Curve brings together Buckman's love of 1990s rap lyrics from The Notorious B.I.G. and Tupac Shakur, and her Feminist ideology through an installation of embroidery on vintage women's lingerie. Buckman hand embroidered rap lyrics onto vintage garments to explore the conflict between feminism and hip-hop.

Katherine Fritz of MTV says that the art series explores the dialogue between the misogynistic lyrics within rap and the pro-abortion rights, feminist content found within the text. Every Curve "illustrates the oppositional perceptions of woman as sexual object, woman as love, and woman as creator; perceptions which, with recourse to history, remain unchanged", stated art critic Hannah-Rosanne Poulton of A Taste for Art.

=== Mostly It's Just Uncomfortable ===
Mostly It’s Just Uncomfortable is Buckman's response to the political controversy surrounding Planned Parenthood in the United States. The body of work includes gynecological and boxing imagery and objects.

Two of the neon works from the series, Champion and Champ have been featured in the inaugural exhibition of For Freedoms, an artist-run Super PAC, at Jack Shainman Gallery and Rock The Vote's Truth to Power exhibition at the 2016 Democratic National Convention (DNC) in Philadelphia.

=== Let Her Rave ===
Let Her Rave is a response to a line in Keats’ poem Ode on Melancholy. The work in this series is about the society’s control of women and their bodies through patriarchal constructs. Though she has been a long time Keats’ admirer, the artist was unable to resolve the line ‘Or if thy mistress some rich anger shows / Imprison her soft hand, and let her rave.’

Sculptures of boxing gloves trimmed with vintage wedding dresses that hang from the ceiling as well as a neon adorned with wedding veils explore the aggressions that women face each day and the idea that they must fight in response. Further in terms of matrimony they suggest the weight, strength, and delicacy of marriage and its impact on womanhood.

== Collaborations and public projects ==
Buckman is a member of For Freedoms, the first artist-run Super PAC founded by artists Eric Gottesman and Hank Willis Thomas. She has participated in several projects with the organization including an exhibition at Jack Shainman, New York City; a bus bench with Monique Meloche Gallery, Chicago; a billboard -‘’Grab ‘Em By the Ballots’’ – in Harrisburg, PA; and a political campaign advertisement for W Magazine featuring Jemima Kirke.

Buckman and Natalie Frank collaborated on Buckman's first public project, a mural at New York Live Arts during spring 2017 titled We Hold These Truths To Be Self-Evident. The piece was a response to election of Donald Trump and it utilizes misogynistic text gathered from statements that former and current male politicians have made about women and their bodies.

== Personal life ==
In 2010 Buckman married David Schwimmer. They had a daughter in 2011, and in 2017 they separated, then divorced.
