= ArtFido =

Art website

artFido is an online auction and shopping website in which people and businesses buy and sell works of art worldwide. In addition to its auction-style listings, the website also includes ordinary fixed-price shopping.

== Origin ==
It was launched on 22 May 2012 by Juan Garcia. Melbourne-based Garcia designed the site to provide a way for independent artists to sell their work, as an alternative to mass-produced reproduction art.

== Charity auctions ==
In mid 2012, artFido received coverage when it auctioned off a number of artworks to raise money for Challenge, a charity who supports kids with cancer. A number of celebrities supported the auction, including musician Dannii Minogue. The main auction item was a work by street artist Hush, which was cut out of the wall of Metro Gallery and sold for $12,500.

In December 2013, on the same day that George Zimmerman's painting sold for more than $100,000 on eBay, artist Michael D'Antuono was told by eBay his artistic interpretation of the George Zimmerman/Trayvon Martin confrontation, titled "A Tale Of Two Hoodies", violated eBay's Hateful or Discriminatory policy and was removed from the website.

D'Antuono then relisted the painting on artFido, with D'Antuono promising to donate 50% of the proceeds of the sale to the Trayvon Martin Foundation.

== Blog ==
artFido also runs a blog which features art-related content and commentary. One blog was discussed by Kathie Lee Gifford and Hoda Kotb on the NBC Today Show.
