= Unity (Thomas) =

Sculpture by Hank Willis Thomas in Brooklyn, New York, U.S.

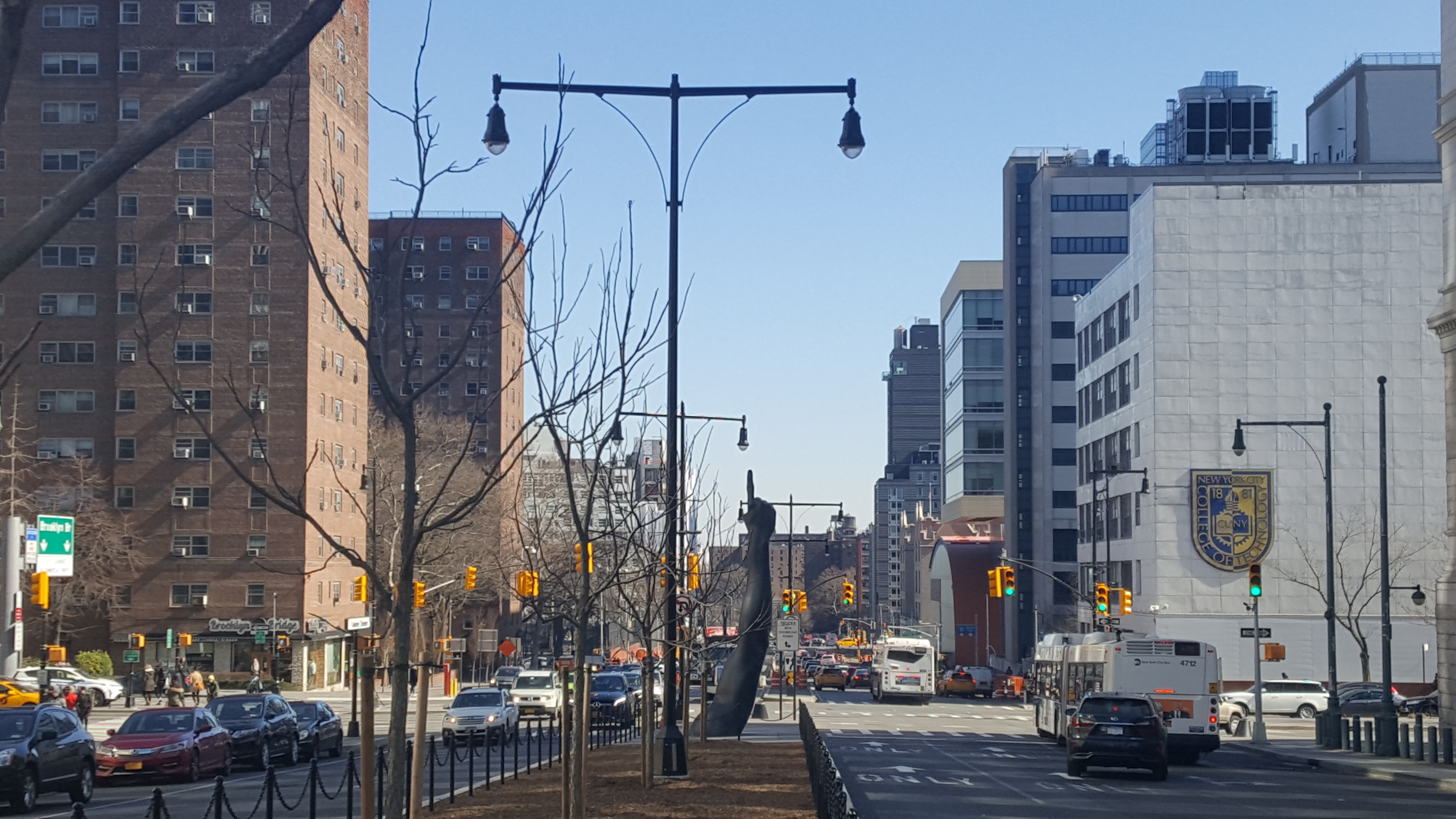
- The sculpture in 2020
- Artist: Hank Willis Thomas
- Medium: Bronze sculpture
- Location: New York City, New York, U.S.
- 40.696°N 73.988°W

Unity is a 22-foot (6.7 m) tall bronze sculpture of an arm, hand, and pointing index finger by Hank Willis Thomas, installed in Brooklyn, New York City. The artwork was unveiled in 2019.
