= The Unseen Truth =

2024 non-fiction book by Sarah Lewis

The Unseen Truth: When Race Changed Sight in America
- Author: Sarah Lewis
- Publisher: Harvard University Press
- Publication date: 2024

The Unseen Truth: When Race Changed Sight in America is a non-fiction book by professor Sarah Lewis. Published by Harvard University Press in 2024, It was a finalist for the Anisfield-Wolf Book Award and an American Book Awards winner in 2025.

In a Boston Globe interview, Lewis reflected that she was encouraged to work on the book by Jamaica Kincaid.
