= Sarah Lewis (professor) =

American author, curator and historian

- Lewis in 2026
- Born: 1979 (age 46–47)
- Awards: Andrew Carnegie Fellowship, Arthur Danto/ASA Prize from the American Philosophical Association, Photography Network Book Prize, Freedom Scholar Award, Infinity Award for Critical Writing & Research

Academic background
- Education: Harvard University (B.A. 2001), Oxford University (M. Phil. 2003), Courtauld Institute of Art (M.A. 2004), Yale University (PhD 2015)

Academic work
- Discipline: History of Art and Architecture, African and African American Studies
- Institutions: Harvard University
- Website: sarahelizabethlewis.com

Sarah Lewis is the founder of Vision & Justice and the John L. Loeb Associate Professor of the Humanities and Associate Professor of African and African-American studies at Harvard University. She is the author of The Unseen Truth: When Race Changed Sight in America, The Rise: Creativity, the Gift of Failure, and the Search for Mastery, and the forthcoming Vision & Justice. Lewis is the editor of the "Vision & Justice" issue of Aperture magazine and an anthology on the work of Carrie Mae Weems. She focuses on two central questions: what is the role of art for justice—overcoming failure—in American society? Why is failure so vital for innovation and creativity?

== Education ==
Lewis attended the Brearley School from kindergarten to high school. She later received her bachelor's degree from Harvard University, an MPhil from Oxford University after she was awarded the Marshall Scholarship, an M.A. from Courtauld Institute of Art, and her Ph.D. from Yale University. Her work has been supported by the Ford Foundation, the Beinecke Rare Book & Manuscript Library, the Hutchins Center for African and African American Research at Harvard University, the Gilder Lehrman Center for the Study of Slavery, Resistance & Abolition, and the Cullman Center for Scholars and Writers at the New York Public Library.

== Career and research ==
Before joining the faculty at Harvard, she held curatorial positions at the Museum of Modern Art, New York and the Tate Modern, London. She also served as a Critic at Yale University School of Art.

She is a frequent speaker and has lectured at many universities and conferences such as TEDGlobal, SXSW, PopTech, ASCD and for a wide range of organizations from the Aspen Institute to the Getty to The Federal Reserve Bank.

She has served on President Obama's Arts Policy Committee and on the boards of the CUNY Graduate Center, the Brearley School, and the Andy Warhol Foundation of the Visual Arts. She is a board member of Creative Time, Thames & Hudson, Inc., and Harvard Design Press, and serves on the Yale University Honorary Degrees Committee.

Lewis's book,The Unseen Truth: When Race Changed Sight in America, was published by Harvard University Press in 2024, and won the American Book Award. It was also named a finalist for the Anisfield-Wolf Book Award. She is the co-editor of an anthology on the work of Carrie Mae Weems (MIT Press), which received the 2021 Photography Network Book Prize, and the author of the Los Angeles Times bestseller, The Rise: Creativity, the Gift of Failure, and the Search for Mastery (Simon & Schuster), a layered, story-driven investigation of how innovation, discovery, and the creative process are all spurred on by advantages gleaned from improbable foundations. Called “lyrical and engaging” and “strikingly original” by The New York Times, The Rise has been translated into 7 languages to date.

Her essays on race, contemporary art and culture have been published in many journals as well as the New York Times, the New Yorker, Artforum, Art in America and in publications for the Smithsonian, the Museum of Modern Art, and Rizzoli.

== Vision & Justice ==
Lewis is the founder of Vision & Justice, a program at Harvard University that leads research and curricula investigating the role of art and representation in American democracy and justice.

Lewis was the guest editor for Aperture's Summer 2016 "Vision & Justice" issue, which focused on the role of photography in the African American experience. This issue received the 2017 Infinity Award for Critical Writing and Research from the International Center of Photography, and launched Vision & Justice.

She organized the Vision & Justice Convening in 2019, a two-day event that considered the role of the arts in understanding the nexus of art, race, and justice. The program was hosted by the Radcliffe Institute for Advanced Study and featured a range of dynamic speakers and events.

In 2021, Frieze New York paid tribute to Lewis and Vision & Justice, with over 50 galleries and institutions offering digital events, artworks, institutional contributions, and screenings that responded to the question: 'How are the arts responsible for disrupting, complicating, or shifting narratives of visual representation in the public realm?'

Lewis is the co-editor, along with Leigh Raiford and Deborah Willis, of the Vision & Justice Book Series, launched in partnership with Aperture. The first book in the series, Race Stories: Essays on the Power of Images, features a collection of essays by Maurice Berger and was released in December 2024. The second book in the series, Coreen Simpson: A Monograph, features the work of photographer Coreen Simpson and was released in October 2025 (ISBN 978-1-597-11585-8).

== Awards and honors ==
Lewis became the inaugural recipient of the Freedom Scholar Award in 2019, presented by the Association for the Study of African American Life and History to honor her for her body of work and its "direct positive impact on the life of African-Americans."

She received the 2022 American Philosophical Association's Arthur Danto/American Society for Aesthetics Prize for the paper, "Groundwork: Race and Aesthetics in the Era of Stand Your Ground Law." It was published in Art Journal. The prize is awarded for "the best paper in the field of aesthetics, broadly understood."

In 2022, Lewis was named an Andrew Carnegie Fellow.

She has received honorary degrees from Massachusetts College of Art and Design, Institute for Doctoral Studies in Visual Arts, and Pratt Institute, where she also gave commencement addresses.

Lewis received the Rabkin Prize, which "celebrates the creative and intellectual contributions of today’s visual arts writers." She was also named to the 2026 TIME100 Art list, recognizing "the 100 most influential people shaping the future of art."
