= Wyatt Gallery =

American photographer

Wyatt Gallery is an American photographer.

== Early life and education ==
Born in Philadelphia, he now lives between New York City and Trinidad & Tobago. Gallery graduated high school from the William Penn Charter School in Philadelphia in 1993. He has a BFA from the Tisch School of the Arts at New York University, where he received the Daniel Rosenberg Fellowship in 1997. He received a Fulbright Fellowship in Trinidad in 1999.

== Work ==
Gallery has produced a variety of photo series in various Caribbean nations. He frequently documents many places following natural disasters, such as New Orleans in the aftermath of Hurricane Katrina and Haiti following a 2010 earthquake. These works have contributed to relief funds for the local communities.

Gallery, along with Hank Willis Thomas, Eric Gottesman, and Michelle Woo, founded For Freedoms in 2016. It is an "artist-led platform... dedicated to impacting collective change through civic engagement, discourse, and direct action." Gallery was the "Billboard Director" for a For Freedoms project in which they placed artist designed billboards around the United States ahead of the mid term elections in 2018.

== Personal life ==
Gallery married his long-time girlfriend and Miss Universe 2008 contestant, Anya Ayoung-Chee, in 2018. Following the theft and release of their private sex tape in 2009, they ceased to appear in public together for some time, but continued dating. They have a son, Kaïri Pilar Gallery, who was born on July 3, 2018.

== Bibliography ==
- Gallery, Wyatt, Stanley Mirvis, and Jonathan D. Sarna. Jewish treasures of the Caribbean : the legacy of Judaism in the New World. Atglen, PA: Schiffer Publishing Ltd, 2016. ISBN 978-0764350955
- Gallery, Wyatt, Sean Corcoran, and Eddie Brannan. Sandy : seen through the iPhones of acclaimed photographers. Hillsborough, N.C: Daylight, 2014. ISBN 978-0988983175
- Gallery, Wyatt, and Edwidge Danticat. Tent life : Haiti. Brooklyn, N.Y. Minneapolis, Minn: Umbrage Editions Distributed by Consortium, 2010. ISBN 978-1884167478
