= List of awards and nominations received by David Schwimmer =

David Schwimmer awards and nominations
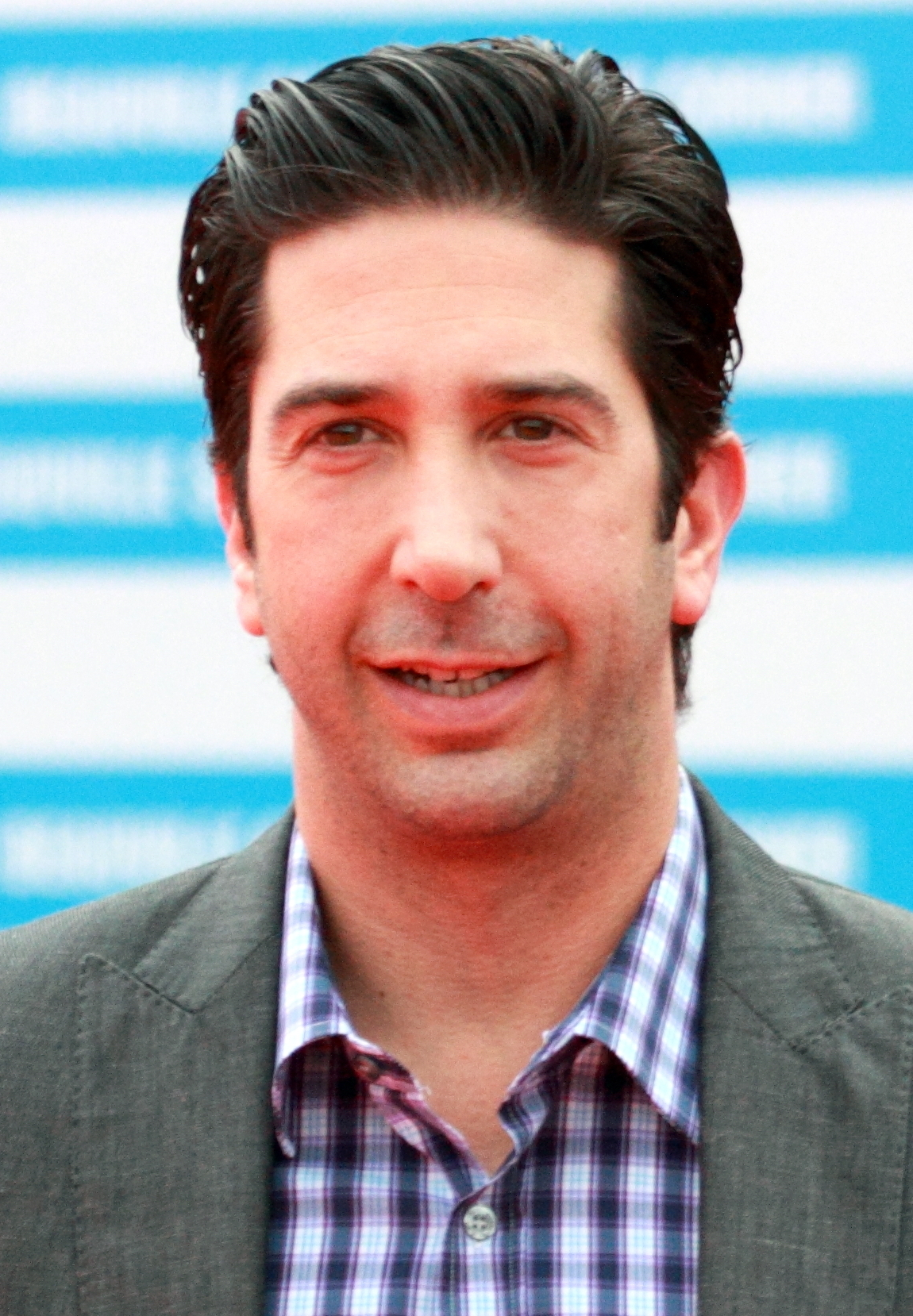
- Schwimmer in 2011
Awards and nominations
Award	Wins	Nominations
Emmy Awards	0	4
Screen Actors Guild Awards	1	7

David Schwimmer is an American actor, comedian, producer, and director.

He gained popularity for his role as Ross Geller in the classic American sitcom Friends (1994-2004). In 1995, Schwimmer received a nomination for the Primetime Emmy Award for Outstanding Supporting Actor in a Comedy Series for his performance. He also received seven Screen Actors Guild Award nominations along with the cast winning in 1995. Schwimmer furthered his career by acting in dramas such as the limited series Band of Brothers (2001) and The People v. O.J. Simpson (2016). For the latter, he was nominated for his second Primetime Emmy Award; this time for Outstanding Supporting Actor in a Limited Series.

Schwimmer has also appeared in fellow Friends co-stars' series such as Matt LeBlanc's Episodes, and Lisa Kudrow's Web Therapy. He has also appeared in various comedy series including 30 Rock, Curb Your Enthusiasm, Will & Grace, and more recently he has been starring in the British sitcom Intelligence (2020).

== Major associations ==
=== Emmy Awards ===
Year	Category	Work	Result	Ref.
Primetime Emmy Awards
1995	Outstanding Supporting Actor in a Comedy Series	Friends	Nominated	
2016	Outstanding Supporting Actor in a Limited Series or Movie	American Crime Story: The People v. O.J. Simpson	Nominated	
2021	Outstanding Variety Special (Pre-Recorded)	Friends: The Reunion	Nominated	
Children's and Family Emmy Awards
2025	Outstanding Lead Performer	Goosebumps: The Vanishing	Nominated	

=== Screen Actors Guild Awards ===
Year	Category	Nominated work	Result	Ref.
1996	Outstanding Ensemble in a Comedy Series	Friends	Won	
1999	Outstanding Ensemble in a Comedy Series	Friends	Nominated	
2000	Outstanding Ensemble in a Comedy Series	Friends	Nominated	
2001	Outstanding Ensemble in a Comedy Series	Friends	Nominated	
2002	Outstanding Ensemble in a Comedy Series	Friends	Nominated	
2003	Outstanding Ensemble in a Comedy Series	Friends	Nominated	
2004	Outstanding Ensemble in a Comedy Series	Friends	Nominated	

== Miscellaneous awards ==
=== American Comedy Awards ===
Year	Category	Nominated work	Result	Ref.
1996	Funniest Supporting Male Performer in a Television Series	Friends	Nominated	

=== Blockbuster Entertainment Awards ===
Year	Category	Nominated work	Result	Ref.
1999	Favorite Supporting Actor – Comedy/Romance	Six Days Seven Nights	Nominated	

=== British Independent Film Awards ===
Year	Category	Nominated work	Result	Ref.
2007	Douglas Hickox Award	Run Fatboy Run	Nominated	

=== Deauville Film Festival ===
Year	Category	Nominated work	Result	Ref.
2011	Grand Special Prize	Trust	Nominated	

=== Satellite Awards ===
Year	Category	Nominated work	Result	Ref.
2002	Best Supporting Actor - Television	Band of Brothers	Won	

=== TV Guide Awards ===
Year	Category	Nominated work	Result	Ref.
2000	Editor's Choice Award	Friends	Won	

=== TV Land Awards ===
Year	Category	Nominated work	Result	Ref.
2006	Most Memorable Kiss (shared with Jennifer Aniston)	Friends	Nominated	
2007	Break Up That Was So Bad It Was Good (shared with Jennifer Aniston)	Friends	Nominated	

=== Viewers for Quality Television Awards ===
Year	Category	Nominated work	Result	Ref.
1995	Best Supporting Actor in a Quality Comedy Series	Friends	Nominated	
