= David Schwimmer =

American actor (born 1966)

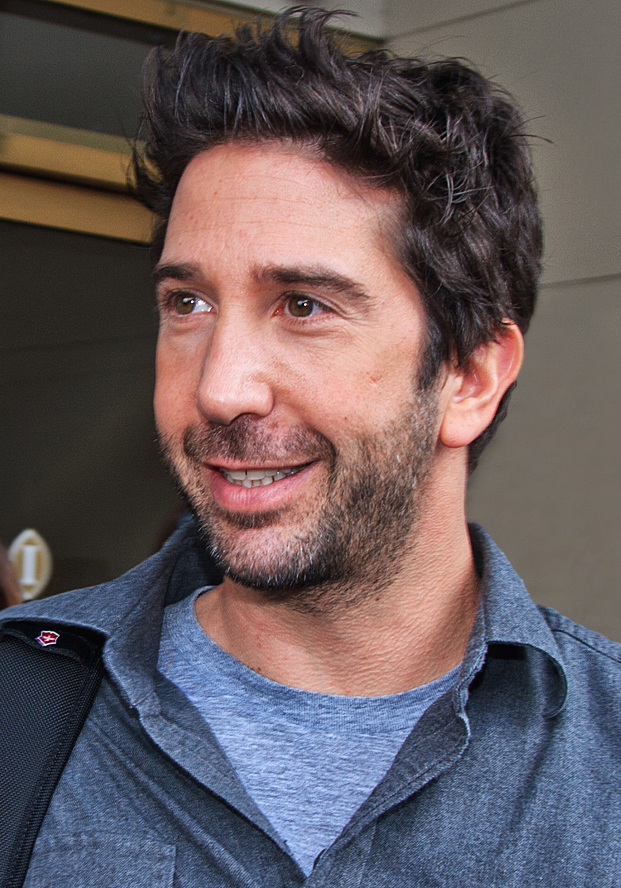
- Schwimmer in 2010
- Born: David Lawrence Schwimmer; November 2, 1966 (age 60); New York City, U.S.
- Education: Northwestern University (BA)
- Occupations: Actor; director; producer
- Years active: 1989–present
- Known for: Friends; Madagascar film series; Band of Brothers; The People v. O. J. Simpson
- Spouse: Zoë Buckman (m. 2010; div. 2017)
- Children: 1
- Awards: Full list

David Lawrence Schwimmer (born November 2, 1966) is an American actor, director, and producer. He gained worldwide recognition for portraying Ross Geller in the sitcom Friends (1994–2004), for which he received a Screen Actors Guild Award and a Primetime Emmy Award nomination for Outstanding Supporting Actor in a Comedy Series in 1995. While on Friends, his first leading film role was in The Pallbearer (1996), followed by roles in Kissing a Fool, Six Days, Seven Nights, Apt Pupil (all 1998) and Picking Up the Pieces (2000). Schwimmer was also in the miniseries Band of Brothers (2001) as Herbert Sobel.

Schwimmer began his acting career performing in school plays at Immanuel College Prep, Bushey England and then Beverly Hills High School. He graduated from Northwestern University in 1988 with a Bachelor of Arts in theater and speech. After graduation, Schwimmer co-founded the Lookingglass Theatre Company in Chicago. He later moved back to Los Angeles to pursue his acting career, debuting in the television film A Deadly Silence in 1989 and appeared in a number of television roles in the early 1990s, including L.A. Law, The Wonder Years, NYPD Blue, and Monty.

After the series finale of Friends in 2004, Schwimmer branched out into film and stage work. He was cast as the title character in the 2005 drama film Duane Hopwood, and voiced Melman the giraffe in the animated Madagascar film franchise, acted in the dark comedy Big Nothing (2006), and the thriller Nothing but the Truth (2008). Schwimmer made his West End stage debut in the leading role in 2005's Some Girl(s). He made his Broadway debut in The Caine Mutiny Court-Martial in 2006. His feature film directorial debut followed in 2007 with the comedy Run Fatboy Run, and the following year he made his Off-Broadway directorial debut in Fault Lines.

He has also worked as a director, including many episodes of Friends during his time on the series. In 2016, Schwimmer starred as lawyer Robert Kardashian in The People v. O. J. Simpson, for which he received his second Primetime Emmy Award nomination, this time for Outstanding Supporting Actor in a Limited Series or Movie. In 2025, he starred as botany professor Anthony Brewer in the second season of supernatural horror anthology series Goosebumps: The Vanishing, earning a Children's and Family Emmy Award for Outstanding Lead Performer nomination.

== Early life ==
Schwimmer was born on November 2, 1966 (although some sources say November 12), in Flushing, Queens, New York City, to attorneys Arthur (1941–2024) and Arlene Coleman-Schwimmer (born 1940). He and his family are Jewish. He has a sister named Ellie (born 1965). His mother was a high profile divorce attorney who had represented several high profile figures including Elizabeth Taylor and Rod Stewart. His family subsequently moved to Los Angeles, where Schwimmer, at 10, had his first acting experience when he was cast as the fairy godmother in a Jewish version of Cinderella. At the age of 12, Schwimmer went to a Shakespeare workshop given by English actor Sir Ian McKellen in Los Angeles. He recalls being riveted by the experience. Schwimmer then entered a contest in the Southern California Shakespeare Festival three years in a row, winning two first prizes.

Following his mother's successful career as a divorce lawyer, the family moved to Beverly Hills, where Schwimmer attended Beverly Hills High School. His classmates included actor Jonathan Silverman. Schwimmer admitted to feeling like an outsider during his time at the school, recalling, "When I was there I always felt: 'This is not me, I'm surrounded by people with a different value system. And I just wanted to get out of California.'" His best subjects were science and math and he originally wanted to become a doctor. Schwimmer enrolled in a drama class, where he appeared in stage productions. Encouraged by his school drama teacher to further his acting, he flew to Chicago for a summer acting program at Northwestern University. He noted that the experience was both "enlightening and exhilarating". In 1984, Schwimmer graduated from Beverly Hills High and wanted to go straight into acting, but his parents insisted he go to college first so he would have something to fall back on. Schwimmer spent a summer as a process server for his mother’s law firm. Schwimmer enrolled in Northwestern University, where he had attended the summer acting program earlier. He had originally intended on becoming a surgeon, having studied various body systems but eventually decided to pursue acting professionally. At the university, he studied theater and was in an improv group with Stephen Colbert, the No-Fun Mud Piranhas. After graduating in 1988, with a Bachelor of Arts degree in theater and speech, Schwimmer co-founded the Lookingglass Theatre Company. Subsequently, he returned to Los Angeles to pursue an acting career. Schwimmer studied clown under Philippe Gaulier at École Philippe Gaulier.

== Career ==
=== 1989–1994: Early work ===
After his supporting role debut in the ABC television film A Deadly Silence (1989), Schwimmer followed this with roles on the legal drama L.A. Law in 1992, and the comedy-drama series The Wonder Years. He made his feature film debut in Flight of the Intruder (1991), had a recurring role as a lawyer-turned-vigilante in NYPD Blue before auditioning, unsuccessfully, for a series pilot called Couples. He landed his first regular series role as the liberal son of a conservative talk show host (Henry Winkler) in the sitcom Monty.

=== 1994–2004: Breakthrough ===
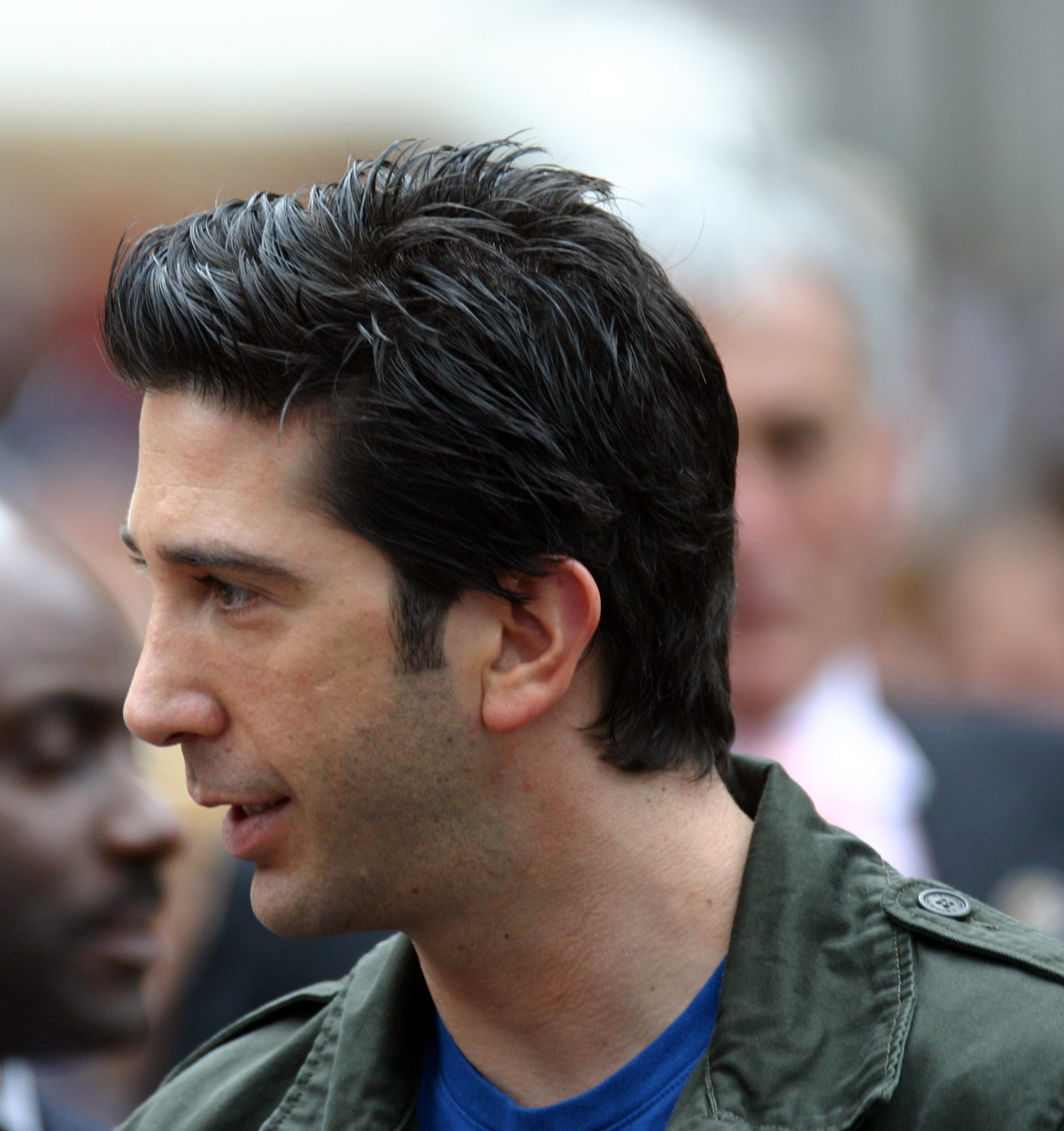
Schwimmer at the London premiere of Madagascar in 2005

In 1994, Schwimmer was cast as Ross Geller in NBC's situation comedy Friends, a series that revolved around a group of friends who live near each other in Manhattan. He played a hopeless-romantic paleontologist who works at a museum and later becomes a professor at a university. Schwimmer initially turned down the role as Ross, but accepted later. Executive producer Kevin S. Bright said that he had previously worked with Schwimmer, the character of Ross was written with him in mind, and he was the first actor cast. The show debuted on September 22, 1994, and was watched by almost 22 million American viewers. Friends quickly developed a loyal audience, with the show and Schwimmer receiving strong reviews. Much of the Friends success is attributed to the plotline between his character Ross and his on-again-off-again love interest Rachel, which has been described as one of the greatest TV couples of all time by various media outlets. The Pittsburgh Post-Gazette was complimentary of Schwimmer, calling him "terrific". Variety's television reviewer said: "All six of the principals, especially (Courteney) Cox and Schwimmer, appear resourceful and display sharp sitcom skills". For this performance, he earned a Primetime Emmy Award nomination for Outstanding Supporting Actor in a Comedy Series in 1995.

Schwimmer starred in his first leading film role in the 1996 romantic comedy film The Pallbearer with Gwyneth Paltrow. In the film, Schwimmer plays a man asked to deliver the eulogy for a high school friend he cannot remember, and begins an affair with the friend's mother. Critics dismissed The Pallbearer as a poor imitation of the 1967 film The Graduate. Variety's film reviewer complimented the actor, writing that he had enjoyed his performance, stating that he displayed "a winning, if rather deadpan, personality along with good comic timing". It also concluded that Schwimmer had a "promising bigscreen future". Janet Maslin of The New York Times cited that his first film "relegates him to a drab role". When asked why he decided to accept the role, Schwimmer admitted the decision was to "make an effort to find roles that are as far away from the character of Ross as possible." Schwimmer was chosen to play the leading role of Agent J in the 1997 Men in Black but he turned it down. He later regretted this decision. Ultimately, Will Smith got the role.

His next film roles, in 1998, were Kissing a Fool, Six Days, Seven Nights, and Apt Pupil. In Kissing a Fool, a romantic comedy, Schwimmer played Max, a smart-mouthed, but dapper and charming man. Mick LaSalle of the San Francisco Chronicle wrote, "Fans of the sitcom Friends may be surprised by David Schwimmer in Kissing a Fool. [...] Take it from someone who has never seen Friends and comes at Schwimmer with no preconceptions: He does just fine. As a TV sports reporter in Kissing a Fool, he oozes the command and self-satisfaction of a young, successful man." The film was critically and financially unsuccessful. In Six Days, Seven Nights, he played the boyfriend of Anne Heche's character. In Apt Pupil, adapted from a novella of the same name by Stephen King, he had a supporting role as a school guidance counselor. "I was scared of the part", Schwimmer said, "but I wanted to be part of the movie". At the time, he noted it was a "little frustrating" that people would typecast him due to his role on Friends. He subsequently appeared opposite Woody Allen and Sharon Stone in Alfonso Arau's straight-to-cable comedy Picking Up the Pieces (2000).

In 2001, Schwimmer played Captain Herbert M. Sobel in Steven Spielberg and Tom Hanks' HBO World War II miniseries Band of Brothers. The television miniseries is based on the book of the same title written by historian and biographer Stephen Ambrose. Although Band of Brothers was met with largely positive reception, Schwimmer's performance was criticized; the BBC News concluded, "Part of the problem ... may have been the ridiculous fact that Friends favourite David Schwimmer plays the hard and cruel Captain Herbert Sobel. The only thing believable about Schwimmer's acting is when he cowers in the face of true battle. His puppy dog eyes make him appear even more pitiful." Later that year he portrayed Yitzhak Zuckerman in the war drama Uprising, based on the true events of the Warsaw Ghetto Uprising in 1943.

In March 2004, Schwimmer appeared as himself on HBO's comedy series Curb Your Enthusiasm. During the lengthy run of Friends, Schwimmer directed ten of the show's episodes. The show's tenth and final season ended on May 6, 2004.

=== 2004–2010: Directing ===
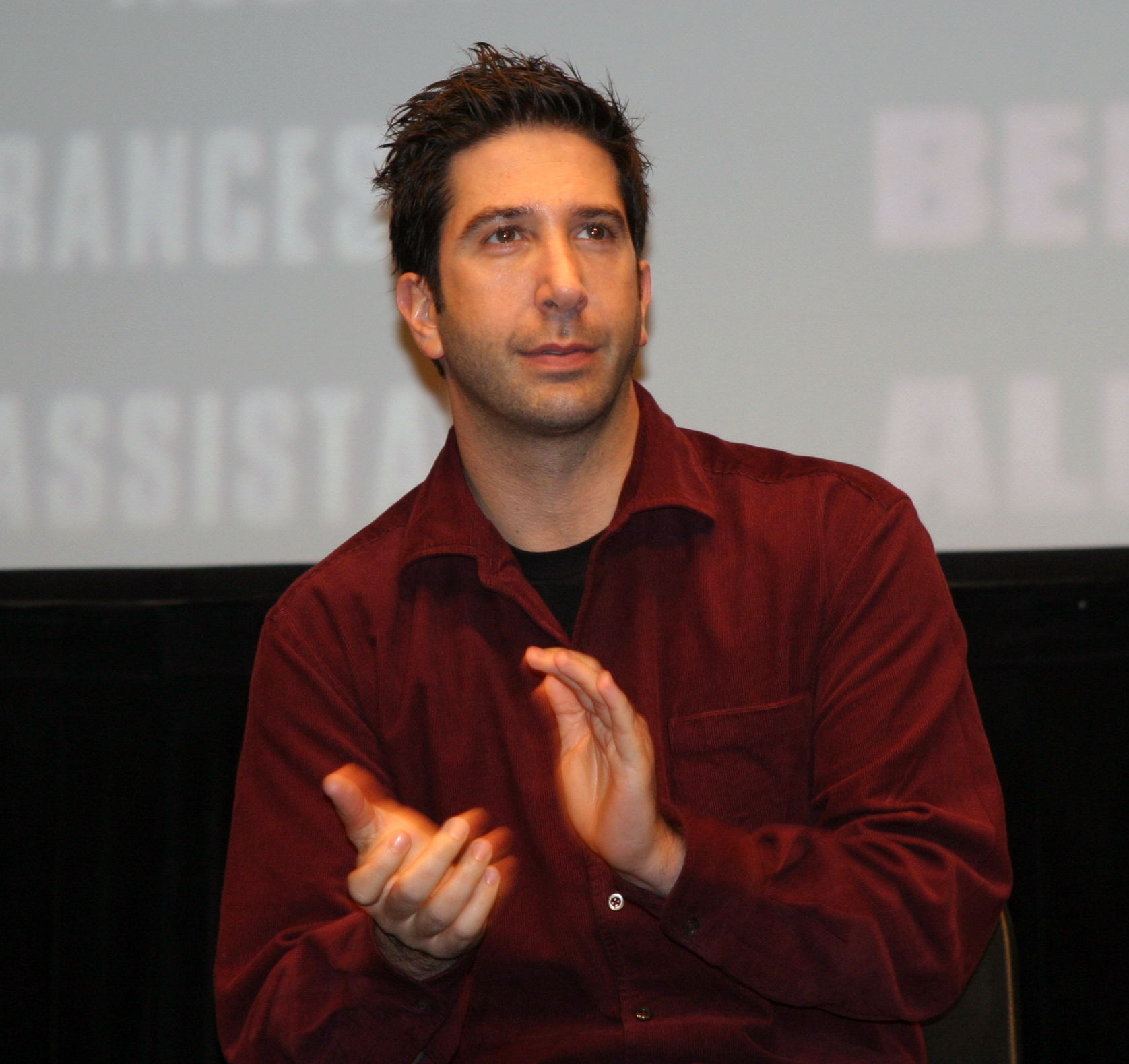
Schwimmer at the premiere of his directorial debut, Run Fatboy Run in 2007

In 2004, Schwimmer was director and executive producer on Nevermind Nirvana, a sitcom about an Indian American family that was not picked up by NBC. After Friends, Schwimmer starred in the 2005 independent drama Duane Hopwood, as the title character, who is an alcoholic whose life is spiraling downward rapidly after a divorce and is looking to turn his life around. The film received ambivalent reviews. Despite the reception, Schwimmer's performance was favored by critics; Roger Ebert of the Chicago Sun-Times reported that the role was Schwimmer's "career-transforming performance". Duane Hopwood was screened at a special presentation at the 2005 Sundance Film Festival. Furthermore, in the same year he voiced Melman, a hypochondriac giraffe, in the animated film Madagascar (2005). The Washington Post noted that Schwimmer is particularly appealing as Melman. Despite the mixed response from critics, the film was a commercial success, earning US$532 million worldwide, making it one of the biggest hits of 2005.

Schwimmer starred on the London stage in May 2005, with Catherine Tate, Lesley Manville, Sara Powell, and Saffron Burrows, in Neil LaBute's Some Girl(s) at the Gielgud Theatre. In the production, he plays a teacher who is ready to settle down and marry, but decides to visit four ex-girlfriends first. For his performance, Schwimmer received critical reviews. The Independent wrote that Schwimmer "is not called upon to extend his range nearly as far as one might have expected in Some Girl(s). [...] Schwimmer remains bland, competent, and boyish—though not fatally boyish in the manner that appears to have turned these women on." However, Charles Spencer of The Daily Telegraph praised Schwimmer, reporting he "proves inspired casting. He takes to the stage with ... his endearing gaucheness seems designed to ensure our continued sympathy. Schwimmer mercilessly lays bare his character's opportunism, casual cruelties, and chronic self-deception."

In 2006, he made his Broadway debut in Herman Wouk's two-act play The Caine Mutiny Court-Martial. Schwimmer played the role of Lieutenant Barney Greenwald in the production, which was directed by Jerry Zaks. In an interview with New York magazine, he revealed that he had wanted to try Broadway, however said "a couple of things came up that just never quite felt right. Either because I liked the play but wasn't hot on the director, or there was another star attached that I wasn't jazzed about working with." He further added that when showed a copy of Wouk's novel "...I was shocked at how good the writing was." His next film role was in the 2006 black comedy Big Nothing, in which he played a bitter, unemployed scientist.

Schwimmer made his directorial feature debut in the 2007 British comedy film Run Fatboy Run. The film stars Simon Pegg as an out of shape man who signs up for a marathon to convince his former fiancée and five-year-old son that he has turned his life around. When asked why he decided to direct the film, Schwimmer said: "As a director, I was struck by the challenge that I thought the script presented, which was that it was kind of three films in one. You had some great, big physical comedy, and I thought funny dialogue and characters. And then there was some real emotion to it with the relationship between the father and the son and the romance aspect." Run Fatboy Run garnered mixed reception, with the New York Daily News rating it one-and-a-half out of five stars and writing, "Most disappointing is how Schwimmer—who spent 10 seasons on a sitcom filled with hyperverbal characters—manages to bumble 'Fatboy's' tender moments." USA Today, however, was favorable towards Schwimmer, reporting he possesses filmmaking finesse "having wisely chosen strong comic material for his debut behind the camera". For his directorial work, he was nominated for a British Independent Film Award in the category of Best Debut Director.

On November 8, 2007, Schwimmer made a guest appearance in the second season of the television series 30 Rock, where he played Greenzo, an NBC environmental mascot. The following year, he was part of an ensemble cast that included Kate Beckinsale, Matt Dillon, Alan Alda, Angela Bassett, and Noah Wyle in the thriller Nothing But the Truth (2008). The movie received generally favorable reviews. The success of Madagascar led Schwimmer to return to the role of Melman in the 2008 sequel, Madagascar: Escape 2 Africa. The film earned US$603 million at the international box office. Schwimmer took part in directing in-studio segments for Little Britain USA, an American spin-off of the British BBC television series Little Britain. In regard to this, he commented that he had "a good time directing episodes" for the show.

In October 2008, Schwimmer made his Off-Broadway directorial debut in Fault Lines at the Cherry Lane Theatre in New York. The production won a mixed review from the Los Angeles Times, which wrote: "Based on Fault Lines ... we can't really tell whether Schwimmer has much talent as a director. We're surprised he didn't try something more challenging for his debut. If not much else, Schwimmer has encouraged his actors to intense their energy levels and comic timing at all costs". The New York Post, however, noted that Schwimmer "knows a thing or two about freewheeling banter ... and for a good while the play crackles with terrific dialogue, expertly delivered". In February 2009, he returned to theater in a Chicago production of Thornton Wilder's three-act play Our Town as George Gibbs at the Lookingglass Theatre. "Schwimmer ... turns in a poignant, richly textured and demonstrably heartfelt performance as George Gibbs. I've seen a fair bit of Schwimmer's post-Friends stage work in London and New York, and I've never seen him better", commented the Chicago Tribune.

On August 2, 2009, Schwimmer played himself in the sixth season of the HBO television series, Entourage. In the episode, Ari Gold's (Jeremy Piven) agency tries to steer his career back to television. Schwimmer directed his second feature, Trust, starring Clive Owen and Catherine Keener. The film, a drama, is about a family whose teenage daughter becomes victim of an online sexual predator. Trust premiered at the 2010 Toronto International Film Festival.

=== 2010–present: Return to television ===
On January 1, 2011, Schwimmer guest-starred on the British comedy series Come Fly with Me starring Matt Lucas and David Walliams, whom he directed in Little Britain USA. The following year, he returned to voice Melman the Giraffe in Madagascar 3: Europe's Most Wanted. In 2013, Schwimmer appeared as Josh Rosenthal, a mobster who was brought up by the notorious Roy DeMeo and part of the Gambino Family, alongside Michael Shannon in The Iceman.

In 2014, Schwimmer was cast as the lead in the ABC comedy pilot Irreversible, playing "one half of a somewhat eccentric, self-absorbed couple". In 2016, Schwimmer played Robert Kardashian in the first season of the FX anthology series American Crime Story. He received a Primetime Emmy Award nomination for his performance. In January 2016, Schwimmer and Jim Sturgess were cast to star in the new AMC crime drama Feed the Beast. The series premiered on June 5, 2016, and aired 10 episodes through August before being canceled. In November 2016, it was announced that Schwimmer would star in his first audio series. Gimlet Media's podcast Homecoming began airing on November 16, 2016.

In April 2017, Schwimmer helped adapt the films of Sigal Avin for an American audience. The six short features depict sexual harassment at work by men on women.

In 2020, Schwimmer was cast as a main character in the British sitcom Intelligence broadcast on Sky One. In the same year, he was a celebrity reader on CBeebies Bedtime Stories, and was signed as the face of British banking chain TSB.

Schwimmer featured in Jews Don't Count, a 2022 documentary by British Jewish comedian David Baddiel on the subject of antisemitism. Schwimmer's contribution, in which he said that he has never felt white, was described as "erudite" by Rebecca Nicholson of The Guardian.

From January 2025, Schwimmer starred in season 2 of the anthology horror series Goosebumps, based on the book series of the same name. He earned a Children's and Family Emmy Award for Outstanding Lead Performer nomination at the 4th Children's and Family Emmy Awards, competing in the category with former Friends co-star Lisa Kudrow.

== Personal life ==
Schwimmer dated singer-songwriter Natalie Imbruglia in the late 1990s. He also dated his Kissing A Fool co-star Mili Avital. Schwimmer and Jennifer Aniston admitted to having crushes on each other early on while filming Friends during HBO Max's Friends: The Reunion. Schwimmer began a relationship with British artist Zoë Buckman in 2007 and they married on June 4, 2010. Their daughter Cleo Buckman Schwimmer was born in 2011. The couple announced in April 2017 that they were "taking some time apart". They divorced later that year. Schwimmer and his ex-wife are on good terms and continue to co-parent their child amicably. He tends to keep his personal life away from the media to preserve his daughter's childhood.

Schwimmer primarily lives in East Village, Manhattan. He gained controversy from neighbors after purchasing the historic property in Manhattan, built in 1852, and subsequently demolishing it. He previously had a loft in Near West Side, Chicago, as well as a house in Hancock Park, Los Angeles.

In June 2006, Schwimmer won a US$400,000 defamation lawsuit against Aaron Tonken, a former charity fundraiser. Tonken claimed Schwimmer had demanded Rolex watches in order to appear at his own charity event, a claim that Schwimmer had denied.

Schwimmer is an active director of the Rape Treatment Center in Santa Monica, which specializes in helping victims of date rape and child rape. He has also campaigned for legislation to ban drugs such as Rohypnol and GHB. In November 2011, he gave the Scottish charity Children 1st permission to screen his film Trust to commemorate World Day for Prevention of Child Abuse and Violence against Children.

In October 2023, he was one of many Hollywood signatories of a letter calling on President Joe Biden to work toward the release of all Israeli hostages after the October 7 attacks. In January 2024, he signed an open letter calling on the Academy of Motion Picture Arts and Sciences to include Jews in its representation and inclusion standards. He has spoken about antisemitism at the Anti-Defamation League's "Never is Now" conference.

In 2012, he rebutted two longstanding rumors: one that he appeared as a soldier on a train in Biloxi Blues (1988), saying, "No. I don't know why that's on IMDb, but I never was in that" (the credit has since been removed), and the other that he is related to dancer Lacey Schwimmer, saying, "No, not at all. Please set the record straight. I guess it's a natural assumption because we have the same last name, but no. I've never even met her."

== Filmography ==
=== Film ===
Year	Title	Role	Notes
1991	Flight of the Intruder	Squadron Duty Officer	
1992	Crossing the Bridge	John Anderson	
1993	Twenty Bucks	Neil Campbell	
1993	The Waiter	Evil Waiter	Short film
1993	The Pitch	Vinnie	Short film
1994	Wolf	Cop	
1995	The Party Favor	Unknown	Short film
1996	The Pallbearer	Tom Thompson	
1998	Kissing a Fool	Max Abbitt	Also executive producer
1998	Six Days, Seven Nights	Frank Martin	
1998	Apt Pupil	Edward French	
1998	The Thin Pink Line	Kelly Goodish/J.T.	
1999	All the Rage	Chris	
2000	Love & Sex	Door to door preacher	Uncredited
2000	Picking Up the Pieces	Father Leo Jerome	
2001	Hotel	Jonathan Danderfine	
2003	Great Family	Tony Adams	
2005	Duane Hopwood	Duane Hopwood	
2005	Madagascar	Melman (voice)	
2006	Big Nothing	Charlie	
2007	Run, Fatboy, Run	Man Handing Dennis a Beer During Race	Uncredited; also director
2008	Nothing but the Truth	Ray Armstrong	
2008	Madagascar: Escape 2 Africa	Melman (voice)	
2012	John Carter	Young Thark Warrior	
2012	The Iceman	Josh Rosenthal	
2012	Madagascar 3: Europe's Most Wanted	Melman (voice)	
2013	Madly Madagascar	Melman (voice)	Short film
2019	The Laundromat	Matthew Quirk	
2024	Junk	Martin	

=== Television ===
Year	Title	Role	Notes
1989	A Deadly Silence	Rob Cuccio	TV movie
1991–1992	The Wonder Years	Michael	4 episodes (seasons 4–5)
1992–1993	L.A. Law	City Attorney Dana Romney	Recurring role (season 7)
1993	NYPD Blue	Josh '4B' Goldstein	4 episodes
1993	Blossom	Sonny Catalano	2 episodes
1994	Monty	Greg Richardson	Main cast
1994–2004	Friends	Ross Geller	Main cast (also played Russ in "The One with Russ"; credited as Snaro)
1995	The Single Guy	Ross Geller	Episode: "Neighbors"; uncredited
1995	Saturday Night Live	Himself (host)	Episode: "David Schwimmer/Natalie Merchant"
1996	ER	Dr. Karubian (voice)	Episode: "Doctor Carter, I Presume"; Uncredited
1997	Breast Men	Dr. Kevin Saunders	TV movie
1998	Since You've Been Gone	Robert S. Levitt	TV movie
2001	Uprising	Yitzhak Zuckerman	TV movie
2001	Band of Brothers	Captain Herbert M. Sobel	Miniseries, main cast (episodes 1, 4, and 10)
2003	MADtv	Himself	Episode: "9.3"
2004	Curb Your Enthusiasm	Himself	3 episodes
2007	30 Rock	Greenzo/Jared	Episode: "Greenzo"
2009	Merry Madagascar	Melman (voice)	Television special
2009	Entourage	Himself	Episode: "Running on E"
2011	Come Fly With Me	Himself	Episode 2
2012	Web Therapy	Newell L. Miller	Recurring role (season 2)
2015	Episodes	Himself	Episode: "Season four, Episode Five"
2016	The People v. O. J. Simpson: American Crime Story	Robert Kardashian	Miniseries, main cast
2016	Feed the Beast	Tommy Moran	Main cast
2018–2019	Will & Grace	Noah Broader	Recurring role (season 10)
2019	Mysterious Planet	Narrator	Television documentary series
2019	Last Week Tonight with John Oliver	Himself	Episode: "Compounding Pharmacies"
2020	CBeebies Bedtime Stories	Himself	'The Smeds and the Smoos'
2020–2023	Intelligence	Jerry Berstein	Main cast
2021	Friends: The Reunion	Himself	HBO Max special; also executive producer
2023	Extrapolations	Harris Goldblatt	Episode: "2047: The Fifth Question"
2023	Captain Fall	Joel Moon (voice)	Episode: "Boner Medicine"
2023	The Great Celebrity Bake Off for SU2C	Himself	Episode #6.1
2025	Goosebumps	Anthony	Main cast (season 2)
2026	Band of Brothers: Legacy	Himself	HBO Max feature-length documentary

=== Director/producer ===
Year	Title	Notes
1996	Shoot the Moon	Executive producer
1998	Since You've Been Gone	Director; television film
1999–2004	Friends	Director; 10 episodes
2003	Humanoid	Executive producer
2004	Americana	Director; television film
2004	The Tracy Morgan Show	Director; episode: "Miracle Street"
2004	Nevermind Nirvana	Director/executive producer; pilot
2004–2005	Joey	Director; 2 episodes: "Joey and the Perfect Storm" /"Joey and the Taste Test"
2005	New Car Smell	Director; television film
2007	Run, Fatboy, Run	Director
2008	Little Britain USA	Director; 6 episodes
2008	Fly Like Mercury	Executive producer
2010	Trust	Director
2014	Growing Up Fisher	Director/executive producer; episode: "Pilot"
2014	Irreversible	Director/executive producer; television film

== See also ==
- Back Stage West Garland Awards, for his Lookingglass Theatre Company, production of Arabian Nights
