= Keila Strong =

- Occupation: Multimedia artist
- Website: keilastrong.com

"Picture Day," 2023

Keila Strong is an American painter and multimedia artist from Chicago, Illinois, known for her vibrant portrait paintings and mosaics addressing African-American culture and history. In particular, her colorful mosaics of various Black hairstyles utilize beads, barrettes, hair rollers, combs, and Lego bricks. Strong has exhibited work across the United States, including at the Cincinnati Art Museum and as part of the Museum of Broken Windows.

Strong studied graphic design at the Illinois Institute of Art – Chicago, graduating in 2011. She became a full-time artist in June 2022. Strong's influences include Cubism and Impressionism. Her paintings and mosaics use abstraction and color blocking to portray their subjects. For her multimedia mosaics, Strong starts with a sketch and underpainting as guides before affixing the various objects in place.
