= Baz Dreisinger =

- Education: Queens College (BA); Columbia University (MA, PhD)
- Occupations: Academic, activist
- Employer: City University of New York

Baz Dreisinger is an American academic, cultural critic and activist. She is a professor of English at City University of New York's John Jay College of Criminal Justice, the founder of the Prison-to-College Pipeline and the founder and executive director of Incarceration Nations Network.

== Early life and education ==
Dreisinger was born in the Bronx, New York. She graduated as the valedictorian of her class from Queens College, City University of New York, where she earned a bachelor's degree in English in 1997. She attended Columbia University for graduate school, where she earned a Ph.D. in English with a specialty in African-American studies in 2002. Her Ph.D. dissertation became her first book: Near Black: White-to-Black Passing in American Culture.

== Career ==
Dreisinger is a tenured professor of English at CUNY's John Jay College of Criminal Justice, where she is also the Founder of the Prison-to-College Pipeline program. The program, founded in 2011, offers incarcerated men throughout New York State a way to increase their higher education options and advocates for higher education access for those incarcerated and formerly so.

=== Published works ===
Dreisinger is the author of Near Black: White to Black Passing in American Culture and Incarceration Nations: A Journey to Justice in Prisons Around the World, which she wrote after traveling to nine countries to reimagine modern carceral systems. The book offers a radical rethinking of one of America's most devastating exports and national experiments–the modern prison system–and was named a Notable Book of 2016 by the Washington Post; it was also lauded by The New York Times, NPR, the LA Times and many more. Dr. Dreisinger was named a 2018 Global Fulbright Scholar for her work promoting education and restorative justice internationally; she has also been a Fulbright Specialist Scholar, with work in Australia, South Africa, Jamaica and Trinidad.

=== Incarceration Nations Network ===
In 2020, Dr. Dreisinger launched Incarceration Nations Network (INN), a global network that supports, instigates and popularizes innovative prison reform and justice reimagining efforts around the world. INN has 131 global partner organizations and built a multimedia web platform to showcase transnational justice and prison reform work. INN has two pillars of work: culture and narrative change--shifting the discourse from "tough on crime" to "smart on crime"--and leadership development and support for those with lived experience of justice systems globally.

In the culture-change arena, INN coordinates accessible global gatherings and virtual events and produced the film project Incarceration Nations: A Global Docuseries, a ten-episode documentary series about global mass incarceration, told entirely by those with lived experience of the justice system worldwide. Dreisinger directed the series, which had its world premiere at the 2021 Tribeca Film Festival and then toured the world led by INN partners. Together with conceptual artist Hank Willis Thomas, Dreisinger and INN have collaborated to create the traveling exhibition and installation The Writing On The Wall (TWOTW), constructed from over 2,000 pages of writing and art by incarcerated and formerly incarcerated people across the world. In its most elaborate showing, TWOTW was displayed on New York City's High Line; throughout the COVID-19 pandemic the collaborators adapted the content to be projected onto city buildings and landscapes, including jails and courthouses from New York and Washington D.C. to Mexico City, La Paz, Bolivia, and Santiago, Chile. The Writing on the Wall also became a global microfinance project for people coming home from prison, whose small businesses are decked out in TWOTW branding and thus serve to battle stigma against formerly incarcerated people. The Writing on the Wall as Enterprise, as the project is known, launched in Thailand (as a food cart) and Prague (as a restaurant) and was followed by businesses in Colombia, Trinidad, Jamaica, Kenya, Brazil, Argentina and South Africa.

For its leadership development work, INN launched the Global Freedom Fellowship, which annually brings formerly incarcerated leaders from around the world to South Africa, to engage in transnational movement building; these leaders then become part of a global community of leaders with lived experience that was launched as a consulting agency in 2026: GF Consulting, the world's first consulting agency made of 36 formerly incarcerated leaders from 21 countries. Under the same pillar is INN's Global Freedom Scholars Network, the first-ever global network of incarcerated and formerly incarcerated university students. With 18 country chapters, the GFS Network advocates for Education Not Incarceration via myriad chapter activities such as building new prison-university partnerships (Australia, South Africa, Jamaica), advocating for policy change on reintegration and access to higher education in prison (Italy, New Zealand, Chile), scholarship and mentorship support for incarcerated and formerly incarcerated students (Nigeria, Jamaica, Uruguay) and more. In May 2025 GFS staged a historic panel on Education Not Incarceration at the United Nations in Vienna, the first-ever UNODC panel of formerly incarcerated university students and graduates.

In 2026, Dreisinger became honorary chair of the Movimento Italiano Diritti Detenuti (Italian Prisoners' Rights Movement), a Milan-based nonprofit organization advocating for prisoners' rights.

=== Journalism ===
Dreisinger spent years as a freelance journalist, writing about Caribbean culture, race-related issues, music, pop culture and travel for The New York Times, The Wall Street Journal and Forbes Life. She also wrote and produced on-air pieces for NPR’s All Things Considered. She wrote and produced the documentaries “Black & Blue: Legends of the Hip-Hop Cop” and “Rhyme & Punishment.”

=== Awards and honors ===
Dreisinger, the recipient of a Whiting Fellowship, is a Ford Foundation Art for Justice grantee (together with the visual artist Hank Willis Thomas) and in 2014 received the Marcia Vickery-Wallace award. In 2022 she was named the Senior Advisor for Global Initiatives at the Bard Prison Initiative (BPI); via this role INN was able to partner with BPI and Open Society University Network to support prison-university partnerships in nearly a dozen countries.
