= Rujeko Hockley =

Curator

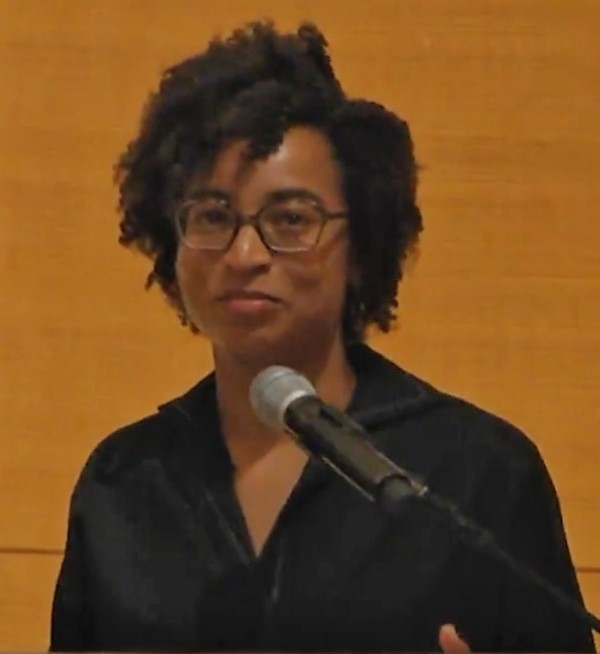
- Hockley speaks at the Brooklyn Museum in 2017
- Born: Harare, Zimbabwe
- Education: Columbia University (BA); University of California, San Diego
- Occupation: Curator
- Organization: Whitney Museum of American Art
- Spouse: Hank Willis Thomas

Rujeko Hockley is a New York–based US curator. Hockley is currently the Arnhold Associate Curator at the Whitney Museum of American Art.

== Life and education ==
Born in Harare, Zimbabwe, Hockley relocated to Washington, D.C., with her family at age two, and frequently spent time in New York and abroad, due to her parents’ jobs in international development. Hockley received a B.A. in Art History from Columbia University. She attended graduate school from 2009 to 2012 at UC San Diego, where she is a Ph.D. Candidate.

Hockley is married to the conceptual artist Hank Willis Thomas.

== Career ==
After her undergraduate education, Hockley worked as a curatorial assistant as the Studio Museum in Harlem where she worked for two years alongside Director Thelma Golden. After her work at the Studio Museum, Hockley moved to Southeast Asia for a year and a half to teach English. Once she came back to the states, Hockley applied to graduate art history and curatorial practice programs, attending UC San Diego from 2009 to 2012.

In 2012, Hockley became the Assistant Curator of Contemporary Art the Brooklyn Museum, a position she held for four years. While working at the Brooklyn Museum, Hockley worked on many exhibitions and related programming, including solo shows featuring LaToya Ruby Frazier, Kehinde Wiley, and Tom Sachs. In 2017, Hockley co-curate, with Catherine Morris, We Wanted a Revolution: Black Radical Women, 1965–85, a show dedicated to female artists of color, and their political and social efforts during second-wave feminism. The show received positive reviews.

In 2015, Hockley made artnet News’s global list of 25 Women Curators Shaking Things Up and she was among Culture Magazine’s 10 Young Curators to Watch in 2016.

In March 2017, the Whitney Museum of American Art hired Hockley as an Assistant Curator. Her first undertaking was to help curate “An Incomplete History of Protest: Selections From the Whitney’s Collection, 1940–2017.”

Rujeko Hockley and Jane Panetta curated the 2019 Whitney Biennial. The selections within the 75 artists in the show included primarily female, minority artists from the two coasts in the United States. When Panetta and Hockley were asked about their choice of including mostly younger minority artists, they discussed the many common threads they found among their choices including college debt struggles, gentrification and real estate issues.

Hockley serves on the board of Art Matters and Recess.
