= Hank Willis Thomas =

American artist (born 1976)

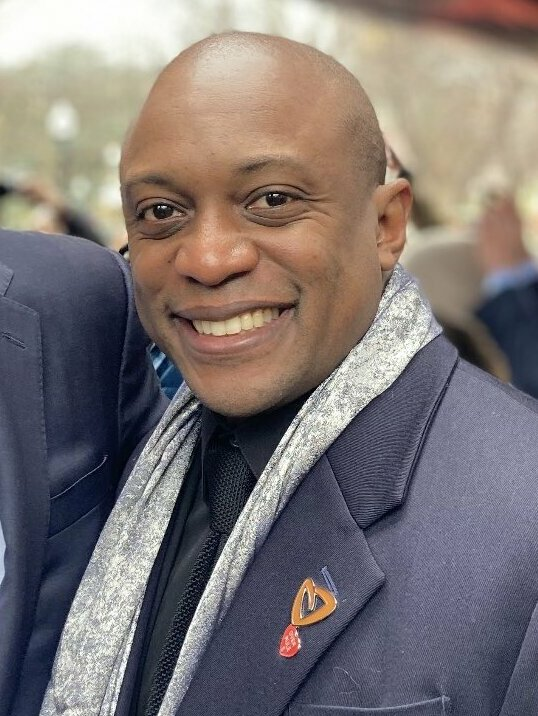
- Thomas in 2022
- Born: 1976 (age 49–50); Plainfield, New Jersey, U.S.
- Education: California College of the Arts (MFA/MA); Tisch School of the Arts (BFA)
- Movement: Conceptual art
- Spouse: Rujeko Hockley

Hank Willis Thomas (born 1976) is an American conceptual artist. Based in Brooklyn, New York, he works primarily with themes related to identity, history, and popular culture.

== Early life and education ==
Hank Willis Thomas was born in 1976 in Plainfield, New Jersey to Hank Thomas, a jazz musician, and Deborah Willis, artist, photographer, curator and educator. Thomas attended Duke Ellington School of the Arts as a Museum Studies student.

Thomas holds a B.F.A. in Photography and Africana studies from New York University (1998) and an M.A./M.F.A. in Photography and Visual Criticism from the California College of the Arts (2004). In 2017, he received honorary doctorates from the Maryland Institute College of Art and the Institute for Doctoral Studies in the Visual Arts. In 2024, CCA alum Thomas received an honorary doctorate from the California College of the Arts alongside Deb Willis. In 2025, Thomas received an Honorary Degree from the Massachusetts College of Art and Design and completed the Owner/President Management program at Harvard Business School.

== Career ==
His work has been exhibited throughout the United States and abroad including the International Center of Photography, New York; Guggenheim Museum Bilbao, Spain; Musée du quai Branly, Paris; Hong Kong Arts Centre, Hong Kong, and the Witte de With Center for Contemporary Art, Netherlands. Thomas’ work is included in numerous public collections including the Museum of Modern Art, New York; Solomon R. Guggenheim Museum, New York; Whitney Museum of American Art, New York; Brooklyn Museum, New York; High Museum of Art, Atlanta; Hirshhorn Museum and Sculpture Garden, Washington D.C.; and, the National Gallery of Art, Washington D.C. His collaborative projects include Question Bridge: Black Males, In Search Of The Truth (The Truth Booth), and For Freedoms, which was awarded the 2017 ICP Infinity Award for New Media and Online Platform. In 2012, Question Bridge: Black Males debuted at the Sundance Film Festival and was selected for the New Media Grant from the Tribeca Film Institute. Thomas is also the recipient of the Guggenheim Fellowship (2018), AGO Photography Prize (2017), Soros Equality Fellowship (2017), and is a member of the New York City Public Design Commission. Thomas is represented by Jack Shainman Gallery, New York; Ben Brown Fine Arts, London and Hong Kong; Goodman Gallery, South Africa; and Marauni Mercier, Belgium. Thomas lives and works in Brooklyn, NY.

Hank Willis Thomas' collaborative projects have been featured at the Sundance Film Festival and installed publicly at the Oakland International Airport, The Oakland Museum of California and the University of California, San Francisco.

Thomas explores the representation of the African-American male body in visual culture in his B(r)anded Series. Writing in The Guardian, critic Arwa Mahdawi observed: "Thomas's work 'unbrands' advertising: stripping away the commercial context, and leaving the exposed image to speak for itself." His two screenprints of 2013, And I Can't Run and Blow the Man Down, express the erasure of past injustices to the black male body by printing photographs of humiliations or executions of black men on retro-reflective vinyl (commonly used for street signs), rendering them invisible except under flash photography.

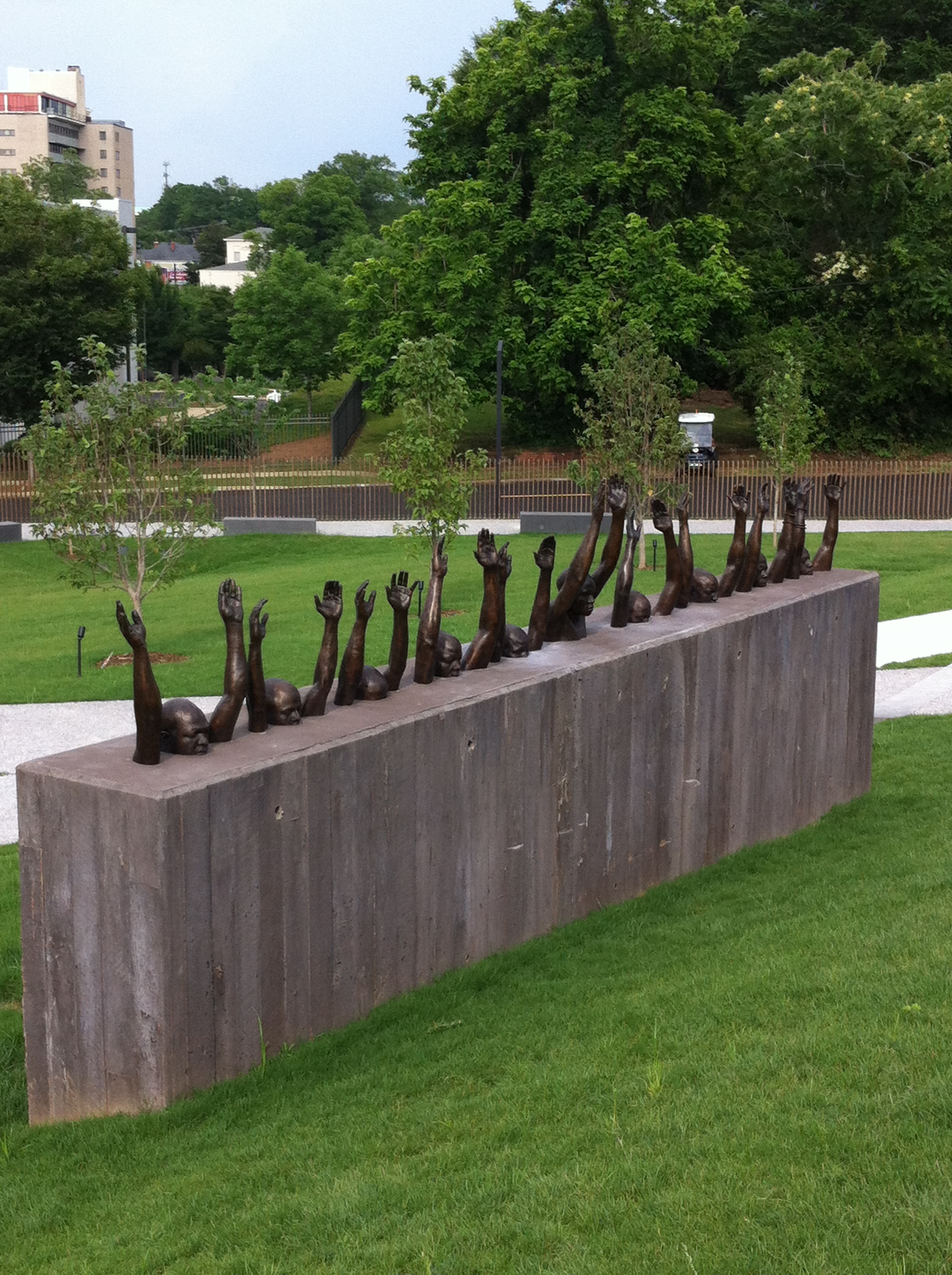
Installation at the National Memorial for Peace and Justice in Montgomery, Alabama

Thomas has a permanent installation at The National Memorial for Peace and Justice in Montgomery, Alabama. The piece, titled Rise Up, depicts a cement wall with statues of black heads and bodies emerging from the top of the wall whose arms are raised in surrender. The piece comments on the incidents of police violence and police brutality that are prevalent in current American society.

In 2017, Thomas also unveiled his permanent public artwork Love Over Rules in San Francisco and All Power to All People in Opa Locka, Florida.

Thomas has acted as a visiting professor at CCA and in the MFA programs at Maryland Institute College of Art and ICP/Bard and has lectured at Yale University, Princeton University, the Birmingham Museum of Art, and the Musée du Quai Branly in Paris.

Thomas is the winner of the first ever Aperture West Book Prize for his monograph Pitch Blackness (November, 2008). His work has been featured in other publications including Reflections in Black (Norton, 2000), and the exhibitions along with accompanying publications 25 under 25: Up-and-Coming American Photographers (CDS, 2003), and 30 Americans (RFC, 2008). Other major publications include Aperature's Hank Willis Thomas: All Things Being Equal... (2018), and Philadelphia Photo Arts Center (PPAC)'s The Philly Block Project (2017).

Thomas' first comprehensive survey Hank Willis Thomas: All Things Being Equal... opened at the Portland Art Museum in fall 2019 and will travel to additional U.S. museums in 2020. The exhibition will highlight Thomas' devotion to reframing perspectives on difficult issues central to American history and the representation of race and the politics of visual culture.

In January 2023, his sculpture "The Embrace" was unveiled in the 1965 Freedom Plaza on the Common in Boston, Massachusetts. The 20 foot high bronze sculpture honors Martin Luther King Jr. and Coretta Scott King and depicts their arms embracing. The artwork was inspired by a black and white photo of the couple sharing an embrace after Martin Luther King, Jr. won the Nobel Peace Prize. On September 13, 2023, Thomas was one of the five recipients of the 2023 Medal of Arts, a prestigious accolade created by the U.S. Department of State's Art in Embassies program and awarded to him by Jill Biden.

=== Collaborative projects ===
==== For Freedoms ====
Founded in 2016 along with artist Eric Gottesman, Michelle Woo, and Wyatt Gallery, For Freedoms is an anti-partisan platform for creative civic engagement, discourse, and direct action. The name was inspired by American artist Norman Rockwell's paintings of Franklin D. Roosevelt's Four Freedoms (1941)—freedom of speech, freedom of worship, freedom from want, and freedom from fear. Through exhibitions, installations, and public programs, the organization is established to deepen public discussions on civic issues and core values, and to advocate for equality, dialogue, and civic participation.

In 2018, For Freedoms launched the 50 State Initiative, the largest creative collaboration in U.S. history. In the fall of 2018, For Freedoms launched a major billboard campaign in every state, including Washington, D.C., and Puerto Rico. The campaign included over 150 contemporary artists, including Marilyn Minter, Rashid Johnson, Guerrilla Girls, and Theaster Gates, among others.

In October 2018, For Freedoms also launched a photo campaign entitled Four Freedoms. In collaboration with photographers Emily Shur and Wyatt Gallery, Thomas and For Freedoms transformed Norman Rockwell's depictions of President Franklin Delano Roosevelt's 1941 address to Congress, which articulated FDR's vision of the four basic human freedoms. Thomas wrote that "The image haunted me because of the world we live in. I wanted to imagine what it would look like today." Through dozens of iterations of Rockwell's original four paintings, the 82 images in the campaign attempted to reflect the immeasurable diversity of American identities today. Celebrities such as Rosario Dawson, Dolores Huerta, Gina Belafonte, Van Jones, Jesse Williams, Robert A. Nakamura and Karen L. Ishizuka, Kiran Gandhi, Michael Ealy, Saul Williams, Rodney Barnette, and others were included in the reinterpretations. The new version of the images were widely shared on social media and Instagram, including by celebrities such as Alicia Keys and Jada Pinkett-Smith.

==== The Writing On The Wall ====
Together with American academic, cultural critic and activist Baz Dreisinger, Thomas and Dreisinger's organization, Incarceration Nations Network, have collaborated to create the traveling exhibition and installation, The Writing On The Wall (TWOTW), constructed from over 2,000 pages of writing and art by incarcerated and formerly incarcerated people across the world. TWOTW was first displayed on New York City's High Line in November, 2019, and throughout the COVID-19 pandemic the collaborators have adapted the content to be projected onto city buildings and landscapes, including jails and courthouses – first in New York, then in Washington, D.C., and Ohio. The installation's first international showing was in Mexico City in late June.

==== Cause Collective ====
The Cause Collective is a team of artists, designers and ethnographers creating innovative art in the public realm. Their projects explore and enliven public spaces by creating a dynamic conversation between issues, sites and the public audience. By exploring ideas that affect and shape society, the collective seeks to add the "public" back into public space and art.

===== The Long March =====
The Long March is a 27 monitor installation commissioned by the recently renovated Birmingham Shuttlesworth International Airport. The installation incorporates depictions of movement, migration and marching from different eras in Alabama history, for instance, the Civil War, the Children's March, the Selma Marches, football marching bands, the railroad, and migrations to the “Magic City.” The long row of monitors (the long march) track to the center of the wall and meld into a kaleidoscope. The kaleidoscope is tiled in the shape of a Camellia—the Alabama state flower. The Camellia, in this instance, is a repository of past and present motion that represents the flowering that grows out of movement. The kaleidoscopic mixes and melds the long march footage creating new emergent patterns, forms and colors. The travelers who will encounter the piece will be able to envision themselves as part of this mosaic that is symbolized through Alabama's relationship to ‘the march’ as a form of historical progression.

===== In Search of the Truth (The Truth Booth) =====
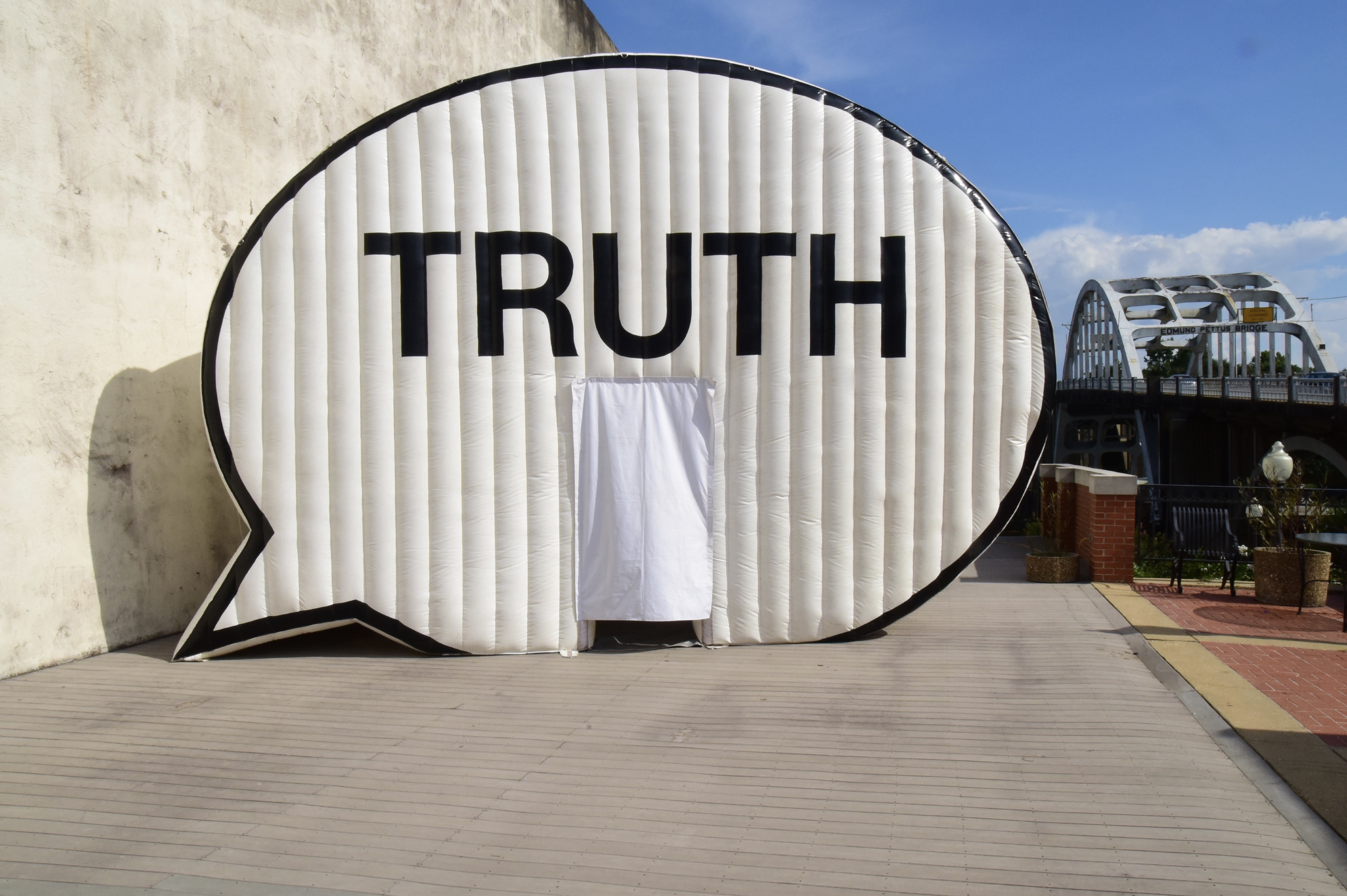
The collaborative traveling artwork is sited in front of the Edmund Pettus Bridge in Selma, Alabama, September, 2018

Thomas is working on the long-term and global public art project In Search of the Truth (The Truth Booth). Also known as "The Truth Booth" it is in collaboration with Ryan Alexiev, Jim Ricks, and Will Sylvester, all members of Cause Collective, a team of artists, designers, and ethnographers creating innovative art in the public realm. The New York Times writes: "The “Truth Booth,” [is] a roving, inflatable creation by a group of artists calling itself the Cause Collective. The booth, in the shape of a cartoon word bubble with “TRUTH” in bold letters on its side, serves as a video confessional. Visitors are asked to sit inside and finish the politically and metaphysically loaded sentence that begins, “The truth is ...”". To date, the project has travelled Ireland, Afghanistan, South Africa, Australia, the United States, and Mexico. It embarked on a world tour at the Galway Arts Festival, Ireland in 2011. It debuted in the US during the LOOK3 Festival of the Photograph in Charlottesville, Virginia in June 2012.

Throughout this long-term project the video footage is compiled and edited into a video artwork. To expand and engage with audiences, the movements of "The Truth Booth" and sample responses are tracked, edited, and categorized on a website. Ultimately, the goal of this project is to try to capture as many definitions, confessions and thoughts on The Truth as possible, creating a diverse ‘portrait’ of people across the globe. It was first supported by the Arts Council of Ireland, and the San Francisco Foundation.

===== Question Bridge: Black Males =====
In collaboration with artists Chris Johnson, Bayeté Ross Smith and Kamal Sinclair, Question Bridge: Black Males is a platform for black men of all ages and backgrounds to ask and candidly respond to questions that are rarely discussed in public. Through video mediated question and answer exchange, diverse members of this “demographic” bridge economic, political, geographic, and generational divisions. The Question Bridge campaign seeks to represent and redefine Black male identity in America. Additional collaborators include Jesse Williams, Delroy Lindo, and Deborah Willis.

===== Monument Lab's citywide public art exhibition =====
From September 14 to November 10, 2017, Monument Lab began a citywide public art exhibition throughout ten Philadelphia squares and parks in collaboration with the Mural Arts Program. Hank Willis Thomas installed a sculpture entitled, “All Power to all people” which consisted of an afro pick standing eight feet tall near Philadelphia city hall.

=== Controversy ===
In 2018, Thomas was accused of plagiarism by South African photographer Graeme Williams. A photograph that Williams took in 1990 of black children in the foreground and white policemen in the background was modified by Thomas, removing colour from the background. The photograph was exhibited at the Johannesburg Art Fair, with an asking price of US$36000, without attribution or mention of Williams. Thomas defended himself saying that what he had done was "akin to sampling, remixing".

In a separate case, South African photographer, Peter Magubane, who has photo-documented life in South Africa for six decades, discovered that Thomas had also altered one of his photos, similarly putting "a white fade over the background", without seeking permission from Magubane. Thomas defended his actions, saying that asking permission to use the photograph was a form of censorship. Magubane responded that Thomas' actions were arrogant, shameful and disrespectful.

The Embrace, a sculpture meant to honor Martin Luther King Jr. and his wife Coretta Scott King, sparked mixed reactions. The large scale, bronze "sculpture is based on a photograph showing the Kings hugging after Martin Luther King Jr. received the Nobel Peace Prize in 1964." However, many viewers have focused on the rear approach, which drew some unintended comparisons, namely that it looks phallic. This further sparked jokes and even accusations that it's a waste of money and offensive. A cousin of Coretta Scott King, Seneca Scott, also criticized the sculpture for not including her face. However, it was funded by private donations and meant to inspire change, and Scott admitted his initial anger stemmed from grief and a misunderstanding.

=== Selected images ===
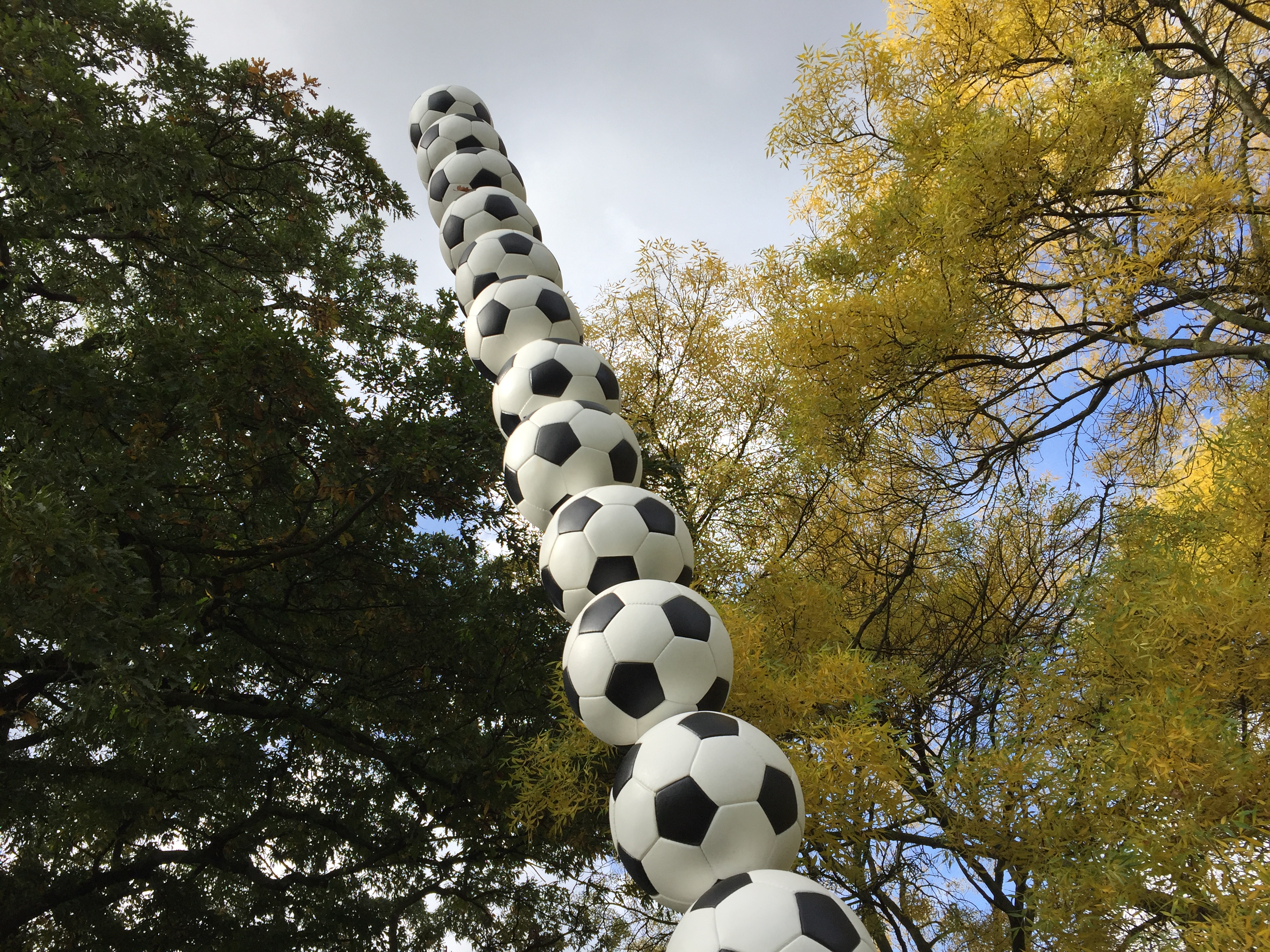

== Awards ==
2026

- 2026 Gala & Cultural Leadership Award Honoree, American Federation of Arts
- TIME100 Art: The Most Influential People in Art by Time Magazine
- Liu Shiming Legacy Award, Liu Shiming Art Foundation
- Honorary Doctorate, Massachusetts College of Art and Design

2024

- Harman/Eisner Artist in Residence, Aspen Institute Arts Program
- Honorary Doctorate, California College of the Arts

2023

- Medal of Arts, Art in Embassies, U.S. Department of State
- Meridian Cultural Diplomacy Awards, Meridian International Center

2022

- American Academy of Arts and Science

2019

- Gordon Parks Foundation Fellowship, The Gordon Parks Foundation

2018

- Guggenheim Fellowship, John Simon Guggenheim Foundation
- Art For Justice Fund Grant, Ford Foundation

2017

- Soros Equality Fellowship, Open Society Foundations
- Honorary Doctorate, Maryland Institute College of Art
- Honorary Doctorate, Institute for Doctoral Studies in the Visual Arts

2007

- Artadia Award
- Renew Media Arts Fellowship, Rockefeller Foundation

== Permanent installation ==
Listed in reverse chronological order.

- You Must Never Be Fearful About What You Are Doing When It Is Right, Equal Justice Initiative, Montgomery Square, Montgomery, Alabama. Unveiled 6 March 2026
- With These Hands: A Memorial to the Enslaved and Exploited, Davidson College, Davidson, North Carolina. Unveiled 23 October 2025
- All Power to All People, Gateway Foundation, St. Louis, Missouri. Unveiled 25 May 2024
- Strike, Equal Justice Initiative, Freedom Monument Sculpture Park, Montgomery, Alabama. Unveiled 27 March 2024
- Duality, The Underline, Miami, Florida. Unveiled May 17, 2023.
- Crosstown Traffic, Judkins Park Station, Seattle, Washington. Unveiled 13 January 2023
- The Embrace, Boston Common, Boston, Massachusetts. Dedicated January 13, 2023.
- Unity, Tillary Street, Brooklyn, New York. 2019.
- Raise Up, National Memorial for Peace and Justice, Montgomery, Alabama. Unveiled April 26, 2018.
- Love Over Rules, Sites Unseen, San Francisco, California. Unveiled November 9, 2017.
- All Power to All People, Opa-locka Art, Opa-locka, Florida. Unveiled October 17, 2017.

== Family ==
Thomas's mother, Deborah Willis, is an art photographer and an NYU professor. His father, also Hank Thomas, is a jazz musician, film producer, physicist, and a member of the Black Panther Party. Thomas is married to Rujeko Hockley, assistant curator at the Whitney Museum of American Art.

== Inspiration ==
Born in 1976, Thomas was amazed that less than ten years before he was born people were still fighting to affirm their humanity. Inspired by the 1968 Memphis Sanitation Workers's slogan "I am a man", Thomas became interested in exploring how many different ways that phrase could be read. Thomas's work focuses on framing and context. He explores ideas about how history and culture are framed, who does the framing, and how this affects our interpretation of reality. In his work he focuses on speaking about popular culture and does so by using a variety of different mediums. He specifically likes to use photography because of the way you can edit a photograph, which can be a way of retelling history.

Thomas has also stated that the artist Kerry James Marshall was a big influence on him and his work.

== Bibliography ==
- Willis, Deborah, Hank Willis Thomas, and Kalia Brooks. Progeny: Deborah Willis and Hank Willis Thomas. New York: Miriam and Ira D. Wallach Art Gallery, Columbia University, 2009. ISBN 978-1-884919-23-7
- Thomas, Hank Willis, René De Guzman, and Robin D G Kelley. Pitch Blackness. New York: Aperture, 2008. ISBN 978-1-59711-072-3
- Harney, Elizabeth, editor. Flava: Wedge Curatorial Projects 1997-2007. Toronto: Wedge Curatorial Projects, 2008. Page 131. ISBN 978-0-9783370-0-1
- Rhoden, William C. Forty Million Dollar Slaves: The Rise, Fall, and Redemption of the Black Athlete. New York: Crown Publishers, 2006. Page 182. ISBN 0-609-60120-2
- Thomas, Hank Willis, Kambui Olujimi, and Carla Williams. Winter in America. San Francisco: 81 Press, 2006. ISBN 0-9777336-0-2
- Armstrong, Elizabeth, Rita Gonzalez, and Karen Moss. California Biennial 2006. Newport Beach, California: Orange County Museum of Art, 2006. Pages 152–5. ISBN 0-917493-42-7
- Murray, D. C. "Hank Willis Thomas at Lisa Dent." Art in America. December 2006: p. 165.
- Dawsey, Jill. "Hank Willis Thomas." Artforum.com, March 2006.
- Golden, Thelma, and Christine Y. Kim. Frequency. New York: Studio Museum in Harlem, 2005. Pages 7, 88–89. ISBN 0-942949-30-7
- Bing, Alison. "Image Consciousness." SFGate.com, 28 October 2004: p. 78.
- Willis, Deborah. Black: a Celebration of a Culture. Irvington, New York: Hylas Publishing, 2004. Pages 221, 230, 290. ISBN 1-59258-051-3
- Addo, Ping-Ann. Pieces of Cloth, Pieces of Culture: Tapa from Tonga & the Pacific Islands. Oakland, California: Center for Art and Public Life, California College of the Arts, 2004.
- Hill, Iris Tillman. 25 Under 25: Up-and-Coming American Photographers. Brooklyn, New York: powerHouse Books in association with the Center for Documentary Studies, 2003. ISBN 1-57687-192-4
- Gore, Al, and Tipper Gore. The Spirit of Family. New York: Henry Holt, 2002. Pages 14–5. ISBN 0-8050-6894-5
- M.I.L.K. Project. Friendship: a Celebration of Humanity. New York, New York: Morrow, 2001. ISBN 0-06-620970-6
- Willis, Deborah. Reflections in Black: a History of Black Photographers, 1840 to the Present. New York: W.W. Norton, 2000. Pages 257–8, 277. ISBN 0-393-04880-2
- Carroll, Rebecca. Sugar in the Raw: Voices of Young Black Girls in America. New York: Crown Trade Paperbacks, 1997. Cover. ISBN 0-517-88497-6
- Cottman, Michael H, Deborah Willis, and Linda Tarrant-Reid. The Family of Black America. New York: Crown Trade Paperbacks, 1996. Pages 122–6. ISBN 0-517-88822-X
- Cottman, Michael H, and Deborah Willis. Million Man March. New York: Crown Trade Paperbacks, 1995. Pages 13, 39, 81. ISBN 0-517-88763-0
