= Bayeté Ross Smith =

American photographer (born 1976)

Bayeté Ross Smith (born 1976) is a contemporary African American multi-media artist, film maker and educator. He currently lives and works in Harlem. He is represented by Guido Maus, beta pictoris gallery / Maus Contemporary in Birmingham, AL.

== Education ==
Ross Smith graduated with a Bachelor of Fine Arts degree in Photography from Florida A&M University in 1999, and obtained a Master of Fine Arts (MFA) degree in Photography from the California College of the Arts.

== Career ==
Ross Smith is a conceptual artist, known for exploring issues and preconceived notions of identity and beauty, cultural traditions and anthropology. Recent videos and photographs have been described as two of the same person, dressed as opposing stereotypes, facing each other, usually one of them the corporate sell-out version.

Ross Smith began his career as a photojournalist with the Knight Ridder Newspaper Corporation. He has exhibited at a number of Art Museums and venues such as the Oakland Museum of California in Oakland, California; MoMA PS1, the New Museum of Contemporary Art, and the Brooklyn Museum in New York City; the San Francisco Arts Commission in San Francisco, California; the Goethe-Institut in Accra, the Zachęta National Gallery of Art in Warsaw, among others.

Created by Chris Johnson and Hank Willis Thomas, Bayeté Ross Smith and Kamal Sinclair, Ross Smith was a collaborator on "Question Bridge: Black Males", a transmedia art project that aims to represent and redefine black male identity in America through a video-mediated question and answer exchange that addresses the economic, political, geographic and generational divisions for black men. This innovative five-channel multimedia video installation was launched at five venues simultaneously in 2012: The Brooklyn Museum, the Sundance Film Festival, the Utah Museum of Contemporary Art (UMOCA) in Salt Lake City, Utah, the Oakland Museum of California, and the Chastain Art Center in Atlanta, Georgia. Ross Smith also has installed multiple site-specific sculptures, including a giant tower of boomboxes at the Alabama School of Fine Arts in Birmingham, Alabama for a community project that incorporates music selected by students, teachers and staff of the school.

Ross Smith's photographs have been published in numerous books and magazines, including "Dis:Integration: The Splintering of Black America" by Eugene Robinson; "Posing Beauty: African American Images from the 1890s to the Present" and "Black: A Celebration of A Culture" by Deborah Willis, "The Spirit of Family" by Al Gore and Tipper Gore, among others.

== Awards and other projects ==
Bayeté Ross Smith is the recipient of many awards, including the Franconia Sculpture Park Jerome Fellowship, as well as residencies with the McColl Center for Visual Art, Charlotte, North Carolina; the Kala Institute, Berkeley, California; the Laundromat Project, New York; and Can Serrat International Arts Center, Barcelona, Spain. He was a contestant on Season 2 of Bravo's creative competition series, Work of Art: The Next Great Artist. As an educator, Ross Smith has taught college students, and mentored youth through community-based art programs. He has worked with the International Center of Photography in New York City, the California College of the Arts, and numerous K-12 and college level courses.
