= Carla Williams (photographer) =

American photographer (born 1965)

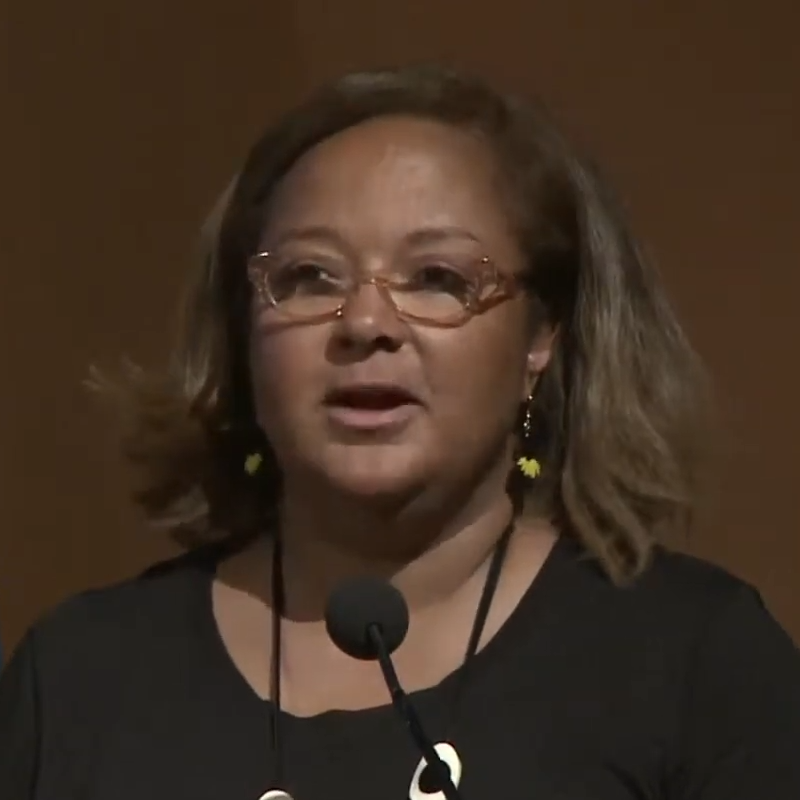
- Williams in 2013
- Born: 1965 (age 60–61); Los Angeles, California, U.S.
- Education: Princeton University (BA); University of New Mexico (MA, MFA)
- Awards: Guggenheim Fellowship (2025)
- Website: carlajwilliams.net

Carla Williams (born 1965) is an American photographer. She worked as a photography curator and professor before opening a store in New Orleans. She was noticed by Paul Sepuya after posting her photographs on Instagram during the COVID-19 pandemic, and in 2023, she published her first monograph Tender and held her first solo exhibition Circa 1985. She is a 2025 Guggenheim Fellow in Photography.

== Biography ==
Carla Williams was born in 1965 in Los Angeles, daughter of Evelyn and Wendell Williams. She was raised in the Catholic Church and attended a Catholic school, with her childhood experiences also "infused with New Orleans culture". Williams obtained a BA in photography from Princeton University, where she created 72 self-portraits for her thesis exhibition. Williams said her decision to create self-portraits was inspired by "taking Peter Bunnell's History of Photography course, and [not being] represented in what [she] was seeing." Her advisor Emmet Gowin called it "the best thesis show he'd seen" during his teaching career. She later moved to the University of New Mexico, where she obtained her MA and MFA.

Williams started out as a photography curator, working at the Schomburg Center for Research in Black Culture (1992–1993) and the College of Santa Fe's Thaw Art History Center (1999–2002). In 2002, she and Deborah Willis wrote The Black Female Body: A Photographic History. After working as a photography instructor at Pomona College (1994) and as an adjunct professor of history of photography and photography at the College of Santa Fe's Marion Center for Photographic Arts (2001–2002), she worked as a photography professor at the Rochester Institute of Technology until 2013. She also served as a board member for the Los Angeles Center for Photographic Studies, publications committee advisor for the Society for Photographic Education, and arts advisory committee member for the Museum of the African Diaspora. In 2016, she started Material Life, a New Orleans store that sells African-American art.

She has attributed her interest in self-portraits to the way "self-portraiture collapse[s] the relationship between the photographer and the subject" instead of having a third party set up the camera. She has also cited Alfred Stieglitz's photographs of Georgia O'Keeffe; Catholic art; "images that male photographers made of their wives, girlfriends and muses"; Playboy and Penthouse spreads; and Cindy Sherman among her inspirations.

In 2023, Higher Pictures hosted Williams' first solo exhibition, Circa 1985, where she remade her thesis self-portraits. The same year, TBW Books released Tender, Williams' first monograph, which won that year's Paris Photo–Aperture Foundation PhotoBook Awards for First PhotoBook. The book and gallery were realized after Paul Sepuya learned about her old photographs through Instagram (where she posted them while her store closed during the COVID-19 pandemic) and showed them to TBW founder Paul Schiek.

In 2025, she was awarded a Guggenheim Fellowship in Photography. Williams's work was included in the 2025 exhibition Photography and the Black Arts Movement, 1955–1985 at the National Gallery of Art.

== Personal ==
Having lived for a long time in Rochester, New York, Williams later moved to New Orleans, to an Eastlake style house in the 7th Ward. She is a lesbian.

In 2002, Williams published two books for The Child's World: Thurgood Marshall: 1908-1993 and The Underground Railroad.

== Works ==
- (with Deborah Willis) The Black Female Body: A Photographic History (2002)
