= Michael D'Antuono =

American artist

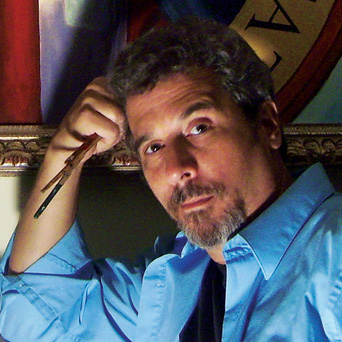
- Known for: The Truth
- Style: Contemporary art

Michael D'Antuono is an American contemporary artist whose work addresses sociopolitical themes. In 2009, he created The Truth, a painting depicting U.S. President Barack Obama posed as Jesus on a cross, which caused controversy in 2012.

== Career ==
D'Antuono worked as an art director at the New York City advertising agency D'Arcy Masius Benton & Bowles, where he contributed to television advertising campaigns. He has also worked as a freelance illustrator.

=== "The Truth" (2009) ===
D'Antuono's 2009 painting The Truth, depicting President Barack Obama standing in front of the U.S. Presidential seal while holding curtains and wearing a crown of thorns, prompted criticism from religious and political commentators. D'Antuono planned to unveil the painting at New York City's Union Square on April 29, 2009, to mark the 100th day of Obama's presidency; however, the artist canceled the public unveiling due to an outpouring of protests by the religious right, including thousands of e-mails, phone calls, and blog posts demanding the planned exhibit be shut down.

=== "The Truth" (2012) ===
Four years after his initial attempt, D'Antuono was invited to publicly display The Truth along with several other of his paintings at Boston's Bunker Hill Community College Art Gallery as part of their "Artists on the Stump—the Road to the White House 2012" exhibition. The exhibition again drew criticism from political and religious groups. Catholic League for Religious and Civil Rights president Bill Donahue and former GOP presidential candidate Herman Cain were among those who criticized the painting.

=== Other paintings ===
D'Antuono's painting A Tale of Two Hoodies, inspired by the death of Trayvon Martin, depicted two figures wearing hooded sweatshirts and was discussed in media commentary related to race and representation. The painting was listed for sale on EBay but the website later removed it because it violated their terms and conditions. The piece was later sold on ArtFido.

In 2012, D'Antuono created Who the Hell Is Grover Norquist?, a painting referencing Grover Norquist, founder of Americans for Tax Reform, and his influence in Republican Party tax policy debates. The work highlights the influence that Norquist, the founder and president of Americans for Tax Reform, holds in the Republican Party.

According to published interviews and exhibition descriptions, D'Antuono has produced artwork addressing topics such as corporate influence, foreign oil dependence, media bias, immigration, outsourcing, and the Citizens United decision.

==== Inspirations ====
D'Antuono's website displays the Picasso quote, "Art is not meant to decorate rooms; it is an offensive weapon in the defense against the enemy." In interviews, D'Antuono has stated that he views art as a means of prompting public reflection on sociopolitical issues.
