= Deborah Willis (artist) =

American artist and photographer (born 1948)

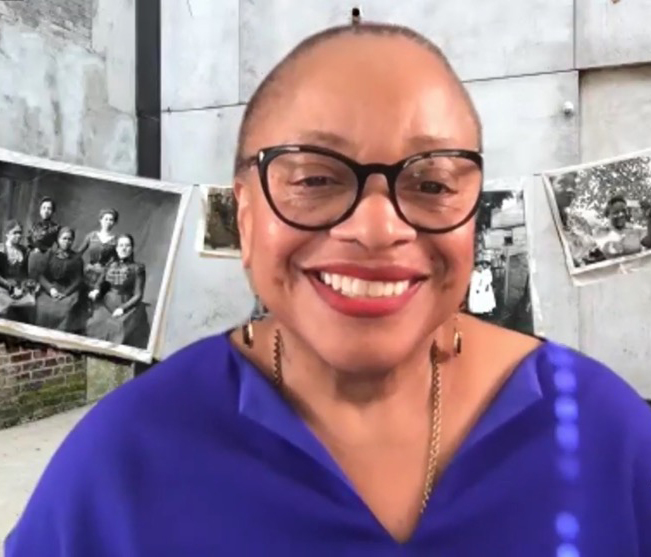
- Born: February 5, 1948 (age 78); Philadelphia, Pennsylvania, U.S.
- Education: Temple University (B.A.); Philadelphia College of Art (B.F.A.); Pratt Institute (M.F.A.); City College of New York (M.A.); George Mason University (Ph.D.)
- Occupation: Photographer, curator, educator
- Organizations: New York University Tisch School of the Arts
- Children: Hank Willis Thomas
- Awards: MacArthur Fellow (2000)
- Website: debwillisphoto.com/home.html

Deborah Willis (born February 5, 1948) is an African-American photographer, curator, and educator. She was made a MacArthur Fellow in 2000. She is University Professor and Chair of the Department of Photography & Imaging at the New York University Tisch School of the Arts. In 2024, she was elected to the American Philosophical Society.

== Life ==
Deborah Willis was born in Philadelphia, Pennsylvania, to Ruth and Thomas Willis on February 5, 1948. Photography and quilting were family traditions she learned from her parents.

Willis's degrees include a B.A. degree from Temple University in 1972, a B.F.A. in photography from Philadelphia College of Art in 1975, an M.F.A. in photography from the Pratt Institute in 1980, an M.A. from the City University of New York in 1986, and a Ph.D. from George Mason University in 2001.

Willis is the mother of conceptual artist Hank Willis Thomas. She was diagnosed with breast cancer in 2001.

== Career ==
During her early career, Willis sought to find and recognize photography created by African Americans. She aims to portray the beauty of the female body through her works. With the help of Richard Newman of Garland Publishing, she was able to create her first book Black Photographers, 1840–1940: an Illustrated Bio-bibliography (1985). It includes over three hundred photographers in the book, and she described in an interview how many of them were ready to throw out their work due to lack of recognition before the book came out. Willis released a second installment called An Illustrated Bio-bibliography of Black Photographers, 1940–1988 (1989) which also includes contemporary photographers, as she previously intended for the first installment.

Willis was the exhibitions coordinator and curator of Photographs and Prints at the Schomburg Center for Research in Black Culture at the New York Public Library between 1980 and 1992, after which she became exhibitions curator at the Center for African American History and Culture of the Smithsonian Institution for eight years. Between 2000 and 2001, she was Lehman Brady Chair professor in Documentary Studies and American Studies at Duke University and the University of North Carolina at Chapel Hill. She then joined the faculty of New York University as a professor of photography and imaging in the Tisch School of Arts, eventually become the chair of that department.

Interested in "historic and cultural documentation and preservation", she has published "some twenty books on African-American photographers and on the representation of blacks in photographic imagery". Among them are Reflections in Black: A History of Black Photographers 1840 to the Present (2002), Black: A Celebration of a Culture (2004), and Posing Beauty: African American Images from the 1890s to the Present (2009).

In 2008, she organized the exhibition Let Your Motto Be Resistance: African American Portraits for the National Museum of African American History and Culture of the Smithsonian Institution. Willis co-produced the 2014 documentary film Through a Lens Darkly: Black Photographers and the Emergence of a People, which is based on her book Reflections in Black: A History of Black Photographers 1840 to the Present. Willis's work was included in the 2015 exhibition We Speak: Black Artists in Philadelphia, 1920s–1970s at the Woodmere Art Museum.

Willis served on the jury that chose the winners of the Rome Prize for the 2023–24 cycle, co-chaired by Naomi Beckwith and Fred Wilson.

On October 9, 2018, Willis was appointed to the board of the Andy Warhol Foundation for the Visual Arts. On October 31, 2024, the Foundation announced that Willis had been appointed board chair; she was succeeded in November 2026 by Franklin Sirmans.

== Work ==
In addition to photography, Willis is also a quilter, sometimes incorporating photographic images into her pieces. Daddy's Ties: The Tie Quilt II (1992) is a fabric collage with added button, tie clips, and pins forming "a supple, irregularly shaped memorial." The work evokes memories of fathers teaching their sons, boys maturing into adulthood, and women adjusting their husbands' ties, while the cutting and reconfiguration of the ties simultaneously raises the possibility that such nostalgic references might be outmoded. The collage "also memorializes black soldiers who fought in World War II", including photos of soldiers on linen fabric collaged onto the tie fabric.

Willis's focus on the African-American experience is also displayed in Tribute to the Hottentot Venus: Bustle (1995), a fabric and photo linen collage in a triptych format. Small images of Saartjie Baartman appear in the left and right sections together with pieced fabric silhouettes of her body. The central image in the triptych is of a late 19th-century dress with prominent bustle, its shape emphasizing the buttocks. Willis has explained that her use of quilting as a technique "reminds us who we are and who and what our ancestors have been to us in the larger society".

Her exhibitions include Deborah Willis at the Hughley Gallery & Objects, Atlanta, in 1992, involving "small narrative quilts built around historical photographs, documents and family snapshots"; Deborah Willis: Tied to Memory at the Kemper Museum of Contemporary Art in 2000; Regarding Beauty at the University of Wisconsin–Madison in 2003, containing "photographs and autobiographical quilts"; Progeny at the Bernice Steinbaum Gallery, Miami, in 2008, which traveled as Progeny: Deborah Willis and Hank Willis Thomas in 2009 to New York and Sacramento; and Framing Beauty at the International Visions Gallery in 2013.

Her quilts were also included in Story Quilts: Photography and Beyond at the Black Gallery, Los Angeles, in 1999, curated by photographer Pat Ward Williams, which showcased the works of three African-American artists—Willis, Kyra E. Hicks, and Dorothy Taylor.

== Awards and honors ==
- 1995: Infinity Award for Writing, International Center of Photography
- 2000: MacArthur Fellowship, MacArthur Foundation
- 2003: Honorary doctorate, Maryland Institute College of Art
- 2005: Fletcher Fellowship, Fletcher Foundation
- 2005: Guggenheim Fellowship, John Simon Guggenheim Memorial Foundation
- 2013: Richard D. Cohen Fellowship, Hutchins Center for African and African American Research
- 2020: Award for Outstanding Service, Royal Photographic Society
- 2023: Don Tyson Prize for the Advancement of American Art, Crystal Bridges Museum of American Art
- 2023: Honorary doctorate, Yale University

== Selected exhibitions curated ==
- Constructed Images: New Photography, traveled between 1989 and 1992
- Carl Van Vechten: American Portraitist, "African Americans and Europe" conference, 1992
- Reflections in Black, Arts and Industries Building, Smithsonian Institution, 2000; traveled between 2000 and 2003
  - Reflections in Black: A Reframing, September–October 2025, Cooper Square Gallery, New York University
- Photography and the Black Arts Movement, 1955–1985, curated with Philip Brookman; National Gallery of Art, September 21, 2025–January 11, 2026; J. Paul Getty Museum, February 24–June 14, 2026; Mississippi Museum of Art, July 25–November 8, 2026

== Publications ==
- Willis-Thomas, Deborah (1985). Black Photographers, 1840–1940: an illustrated bio-bibliography. New York: Garland. ISBN 0-8240-9147-7.
- Driskell, David C; Lewis, David L.; Willis Ryan, Deborah (1987). Harlem Renaissance: art of Black America. New York: The Studio Museum in Harlem/Harry N. Abrams. ISBN 0-8109-1099-3.
- Willis-Thomas, Deborah (1989). An Illustrated Bio-bibliography of Black Photographers, 1940–1988. New York: Garland. ISBN 0-8240-8389-X.
- Willis, Deborah; Dodson, Howard (1989). Black Photographers Bear Witness: 100 years of social protest. Williamstown: Williams College Museum of Art. ISBN 0-913697-09-5.
- Willis, Deborah; Simpson, Lorna (1992). Lorna Simpson. San Francisco: Friends of Photography. ISBN 0-933286-60-0.
- Willis, Deborah (1992). Early Black Photographers, 1840–1940: 23 postcards. New York: New Press. ISBN 1-56584-007-0.
- Willis-Braithwaite, Deborah; Birt, Rodger C. (1993). VanDerZee, photographer, 1886–1983. New York: H.N. Abrams. ISBN 0-8109-3923-1.
- Willis, Deborah (1993). J.P. Ball: daguerrean and studio photographer. New York: Garland. ISBN 0-8153-0716-0.
- Driskell, David C.; Lewis, David L.; Willis, Deborah (1994). Harlem Renaissance: art of Black America. New York: Studio Museum in Harlem/Abradale Press. ISBN 0-8109-8128-9.
- Willis, Deborah (1994). Picturing Us: African American identity in photography. New York: New Press. ISBN 1-56584-107-7.
- Willis, Deborah; Lusaka, Jane (1994). Imagining Families: images and voices. Washington, DC: National African American Museum. ISBN 1-885892-00-4.
- Cottman, Michael H.; Willis, Deborah (1995). Million Man March. New York: Crown Trade Paperbacks. ISBN 0-517-88763-0.
- Willis, Deborah; Lusaka, Jane (1996). Visual Journal: Harlem and D.C. in the thirties and forties. Washington, DC: Smithsonian Institution Press. ISBN 1-56098-691-3.
- Cottman, Michael H.; Willis, Deborah; Tarrant-Reid, Linda (1996). The Family of Black America. New York: Crown Trade Paperbacks. ISBN 0-517-88822-X.
- Willis, Deborah (2000). Reflections in Black: a history of Black photographers, 1840 to the present. New York: W.W. Norton. ISBN 0-393-04880-2.
- Crouch, Stanley; Willis, Deborah (2002). One Shot Harris: the photographs of Charles "Teenie" Harris. New York: Harry N. Abrams. ISBN 0-8109-3272-5.
- Willis, Deborah; Williams, Carla (2002). The Black Female Body: a photographic history. Philadelphia: Temple University Press. ISBN 1-56639-928-9.
- Lewis, David L.; Willis, Deborah (2003). A Small Nation of People: W.E.B. Du Bois and African-American portraits of progress. New York: Amistad. ISBN 0-06-052342-5.
- Willis, Deborah; Moore, Sean; Prince, Karen (2004). Black: a celebration of a culture. Irvington, NY: Hylas. ISBN 1-59258-051-3.
- Willis, Deborah (2005). Family History Memory: recording African American life. New York: Hylas. ISBN 1-59258-086-6.
- Wallis, Brian; Willis, Deborah (2005). African American Vernacular Photography: selections from the Daniel Cowin Collection. New York: International Center of Photography. ISBN 3-86521-225-5.
- Willis, Deborah (2007). Let Your Motto Be Resistance: African American portraits. Washington, DC: National Museum of African American History and Culture. ISBN 978-1-58834-242-3.
- Willis, Deborah; Merida, Kevin (2008). Obama: the historic campaign in photographs. New York: Amistad. ISBN 978-0-06-173309-3.
- Willis, Deborah; Bernard, Emily (2009). Michelle Obama: The First Lady in Photographs. New York: W. W. Norton. ISBN 978-0393077476.
- Willis, Deborah (2009). Posing Beauty: African American images from the 1890s to the present. New York: W. W. Norton. ISBN 978-0-393-06696-8.
- Willis, Deborah; Thomas, Hank Willis; Brooks, Kalia (2009). Progeny: Deborah Willis and Hank Willis Thomas. New York: Miriam and Ira D. Wallach Art Gallery. ISBN 978-1-884919-23-7.
- Willis, Deborah; Krauthamer, Barbara (2012). Envisioning Emancipation: Black Americans and the End of Slavery. Philadelphia: Temple University Press. ISBN 978-1-43990-985-0.
- Willis, Deborah (2021). The Black Civil War Soldier: A Visual History of Conflict and Citizenship. New York University Press. ISBN 978-1-47980-900-4.
- Willis, Deborah; Raiford, Leigh; Lewis, Sarah, eds. (2025). Coreen Simpson: A Monograph. New York: Aperture. ISBN 978-1-597-11585-8.
