= James M. Mannas =

American film director (born 1941)

James "Jimmie" Mannas
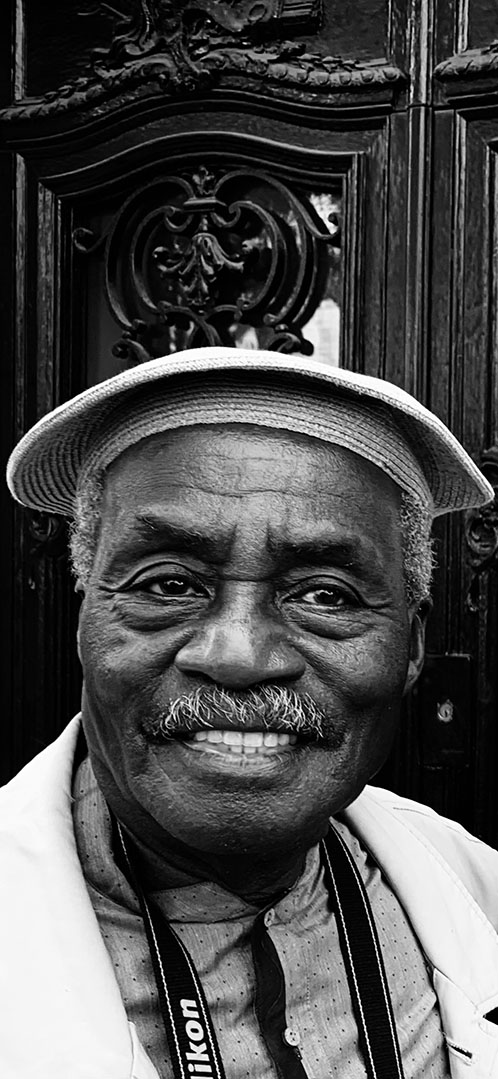
- Born: September 15, 1941 (age 84); Newark, New Jersey, U.S.
- Education: New York Institute of Photography, New York University
- Occupations: Photographer, film director, cinematographer, screenwriter

James "Jimmie" Mannas Jr. (born September 15, 1941) is an African American photographer, film director, cinematographer, and screenwriter. He is one of the fifteen founding members of the Kamoinge Workshop (1963), which evolved from the union of Kamoinge and Group 35, two groups of African American photographers based in New York City.

His black-and-white photography depicts African American New York City street life, avant-garde jazz musicians, dancers, portraits, landscapes, and post-colonial Guyana. T.T. Griffith Archives, a New York-based archivist, preserves a large number of Mannas' photography.

== Early life and education ==
Mannas' early life was shaped by his family and the community of Harlem. Born in Newark, New Jersey, on September 15, 1941, Mannas was one of nine children. His family later moved to Harlem, New York, in 1943.

Mannas grew up on 117th Street in Harlem with his friend Shawn Walker. Mannas was introduced to photography by Walker's Uncle Hoover, a photographer who frequently took images around their neighborhood and taught them how to use a camera. When Walker received his first camera, Mannas was inspired to acquire one, too. Based on an agreement with his father, Mannas worked to save money so his father could purchase his first camera, a Kodak Brownie Hawkeye at 11-years-old.

Upon graduating from high school in 1958, Mannas decided to pursue photography and enrolled in the New York Institute of Photography, where he received his degree in 1960. He received a degree in film editing from the School of Visual Arts in 1963. In 1969, Mannas received a certificate from New York University for studies in film and television.

== Career ==
=== Photography ===
While Mannas was studying commercial photography in college, he also practiced as a street photographer and worked at the Slide-O-Chrome photo lab processing film. He formed a close bond with his friends Herbert Randall and Albert “Al” Fennar during this time. Louis Draper, a pivotal figure in the group, met Randall in 1958 during a photography class taught by Harold Feinstein. In 1962, Randall introduced Fennar to Draper during a visit to the Museum of Modern Art. This visit, where they saw an exhibition of photography by Robert Frank and Harry Callahan, was a transformative experience that solidified their friendship and led to the beginning of Kamoinge.

Draper, Mannas, Fennar, and Randall began having informal Sunday evening gatherings and started calling themselves Kamoinge. After high school, Walker took a hiatus from photography. However, Mannas encouraged him to attend an upcoming meeting of Black photographers, rekindling his interest in the medium. Concurrently, Draper joined another Harlem-based photography group called Group 35 because every member used 35mm cameras. Group 35 was composed of Ray Francis, the group's founder, along with Draper, Herman Howard, Earl Jones, Calvin Mercer, and Mel Dixon.

The two photography groups officially coalesced to become one in 1963. However, Draper recalls Ray Francis being the first to suggest the groups’ formation, stating “Ray Francis has been the moving force for this gathering…Ray gave the soundest rationale for coming together as a group. He said that we were working in isolation, unaware of one another’s presence. He felt that the nurturing and sharing we could give each other as a group was critical to our growth and development."

=== Kamoinge Workshop ===
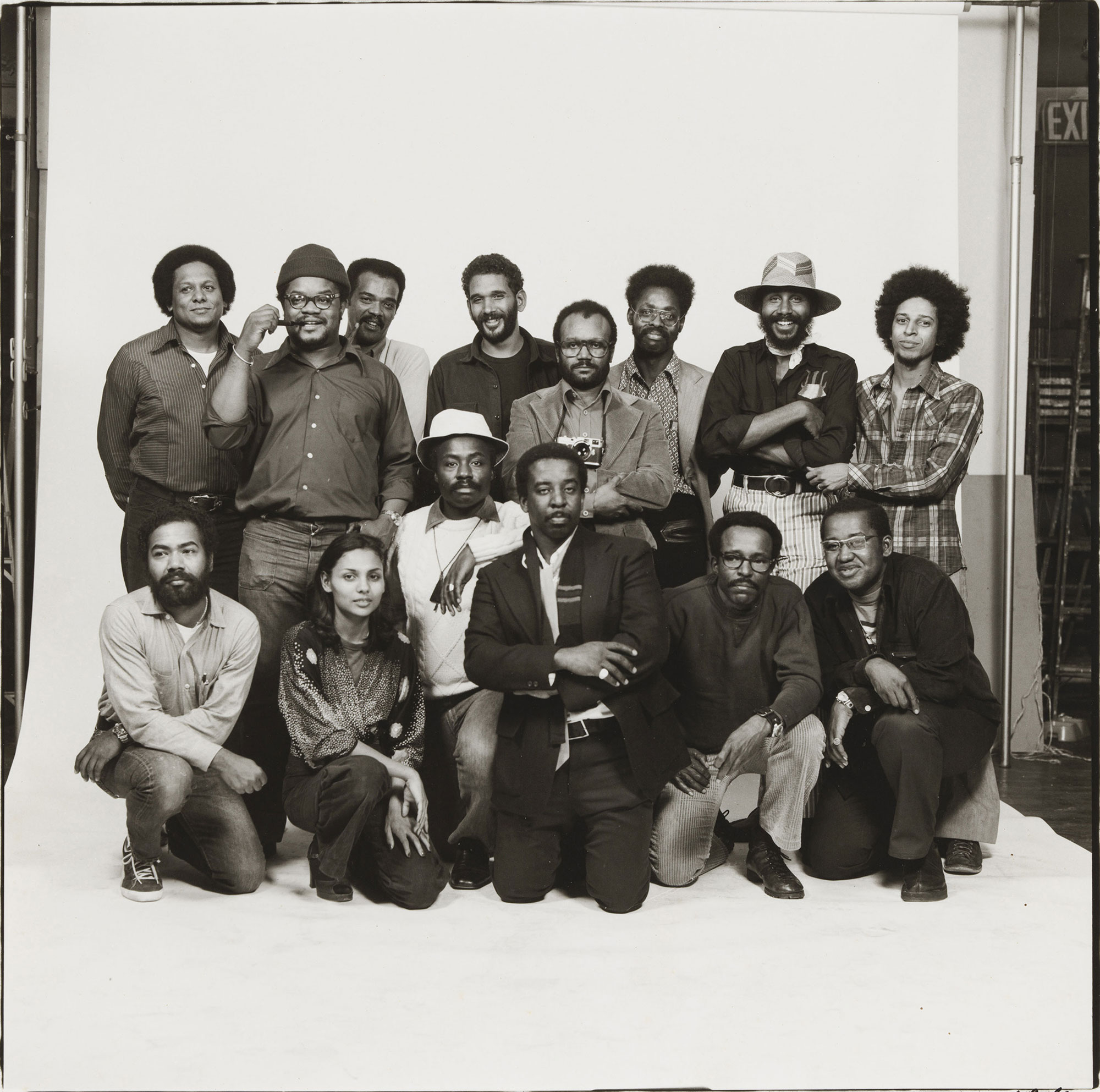
Anthony Barboza, Kamoinge Members, 1973

The Kamoinge Workshop, which was formulated in the early years of the Civil Rights era and came of age in the Black Arts Movement, consisted of fifteen members, including Louis Draper, Herbert Randall, James Mannas, Shawn Walker, Ray Francis, Al Fennar, Anthony Barboza, Adger Cowans, Daniel Dawson, Herbert Robinson, Beuford Smith, Calvin Wilson, and Ming Smith between 1963 and 1972.

The word “Kamoinge,” pronounced “kuh-moyn-gay,” was derived from the Gikuyu language of Kenya and means “a group of people acting together.” At a time when Black people were coming into their political consciousness, the name “Kamoinge” became a name that represented an “emerging African consciousness exploding within” them. “For the young artists, the word signaled their collective ambition and linked them to the global Pan-African movement, devoted to liberation struggles in colonized countries and connecting widely dispersed communities of the Black diaspora.” Collective empowerment came in the form of group critiques, educational workshops, mentorships, along with securing advertising work, producing exhibition opportunities and fostering institutional connections. Since some Kamoinge members weren't formally trained in photography, “the workshop served as an important intellectual and scholarly space.”

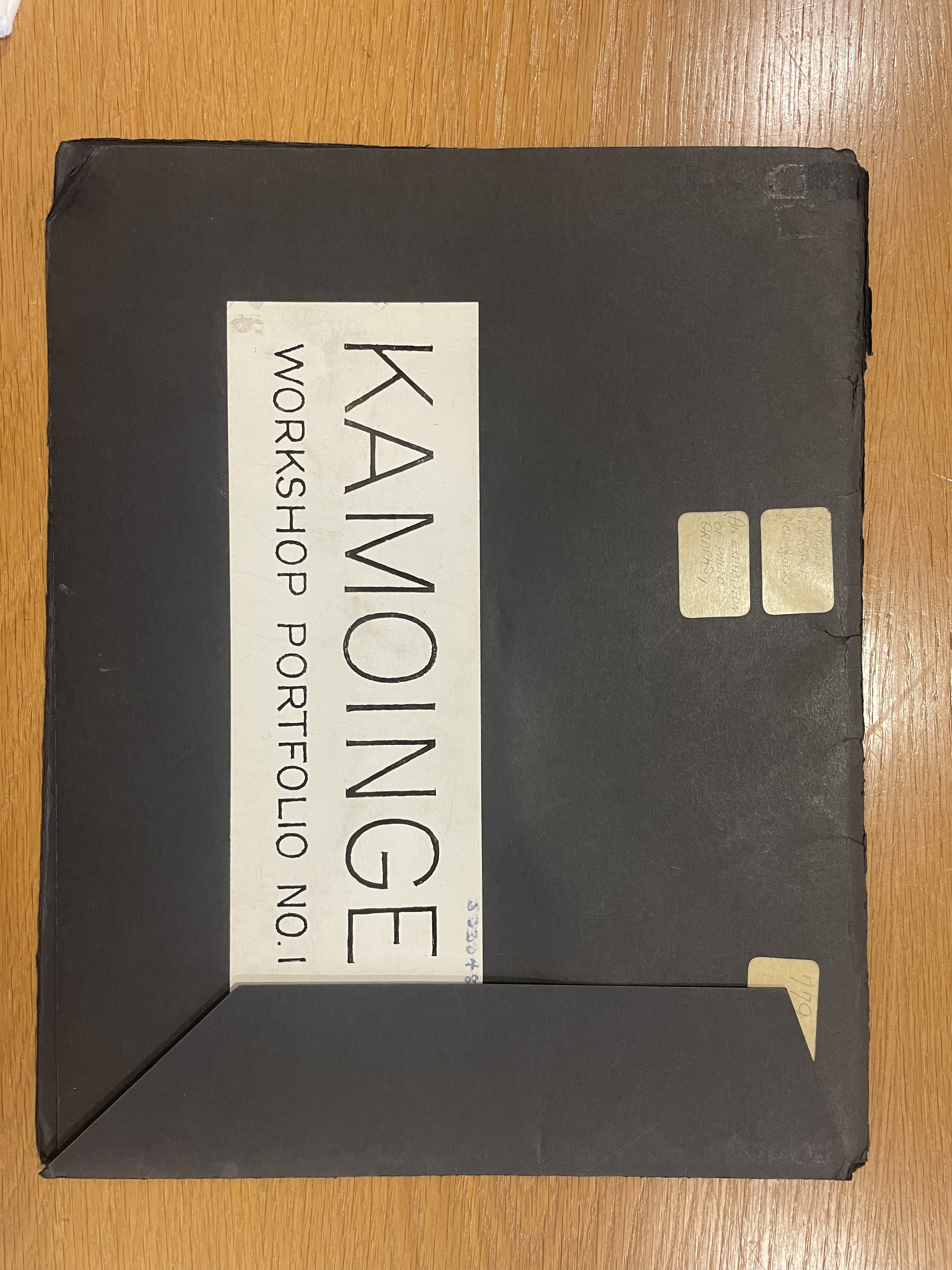
Kamoinge Workshop Portfolio, No. 1

The group's ethos was to craft a visual aesthetic that offered representations of Black people as they saw and experienced them, as beautiful and dignified, to reframe narratives around race and photography. “Most Kamoinge photographers fashioned a form of political coverage that differed from mainstream photojournalism: they avoided images of racist clashes and stereotypes of Black poverty, drugs, and violence.” In a statement originally published in the December issue of James Van DerZee Institute's Photo Newsletter, Draper writes, “It is our endeavor to produce significant visual images of our time... We speak of our lives as only we can” to incite the group's dedication to self-determination through image-making.

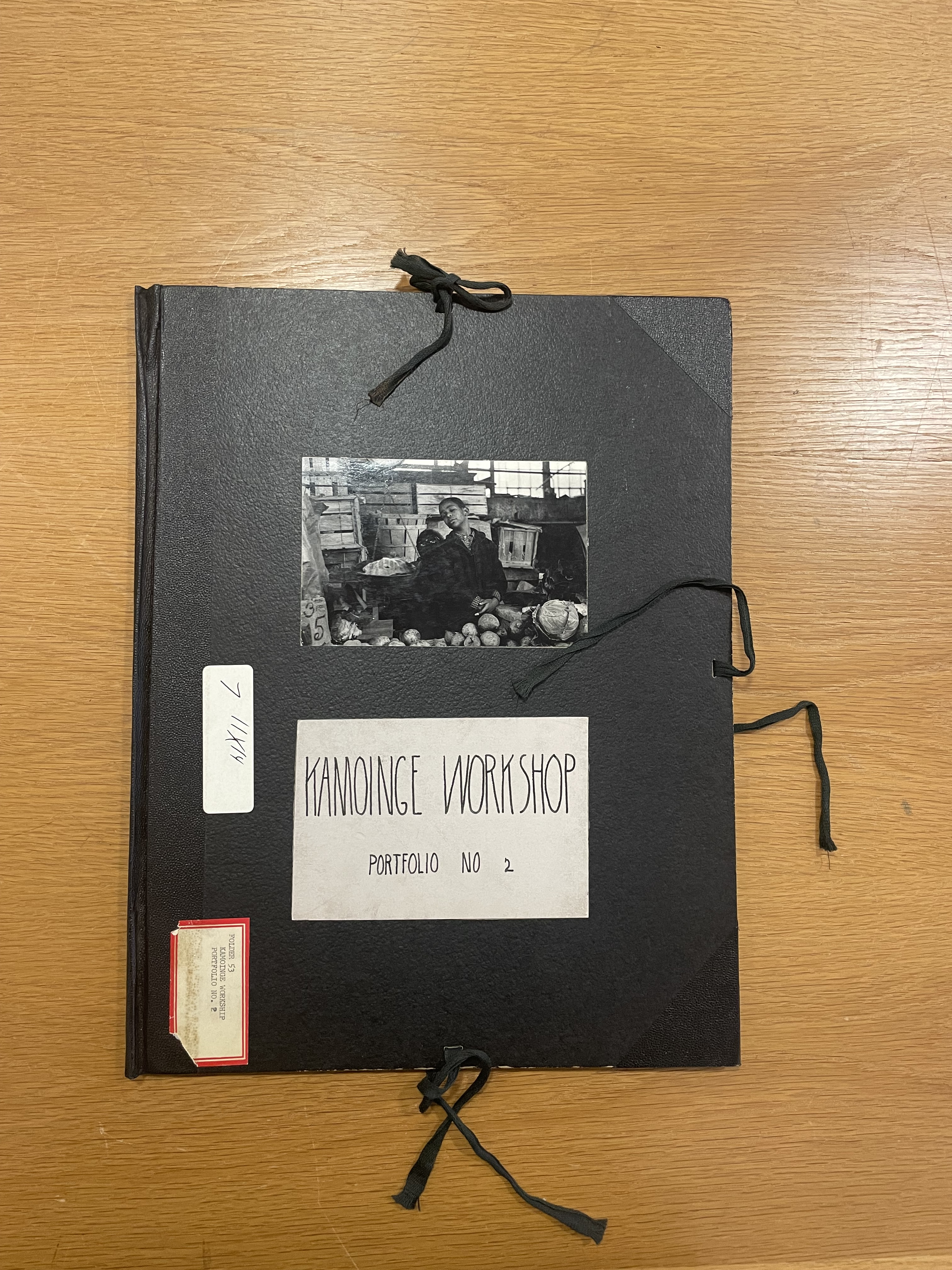
Kamoinge Workshop Portfolio, No. 2

The African American photographer Roy DeCarava was instrumental in guiding Kamoinge's visual language and philosophy. DeCarava was the collective's first director in 1963. It was at DeCarva's Sixth Avenue and West 38th Street loft that most of the group's meetings were held in the latter part of 1963. Mannas presided over the Kamoinge Workshop as president from 1976 to 1977, and was acting director in 1979.

Though DeCarava's presidency was short-lived, he remained an active mentor to the group. DeCarava's photography aesthetic left an impression on the Kamoinge photographers, who began to adopt elements of his style, from his intense blacks to his rich shadows and grayscale, along with his photo-realist perspective. The Kamoinge Workshop members developed a range of photographic styles ranging from near-abstractions, social documentary realism, street photography, and portraiture, capturing images of Black people in America and around the world in black-and-white. Members were dedicated to challenging their formal aesthetic while remaining committed to using photography for socio-political reform. Apart from photography, the collective found inspiration from jazz, a music genre that became a soundtrack for the shifting politics of Black people in America, following the philosophical register of the Civil Rights and Black Arts Movement. Jazz offered Kamoinge members the expansion they needed to make art without boundaries; it prompted them to become artistic, intellectual, and geographic explorers, as some members, like Mannas and Ming Smith, who photographed overseas in Guyana and Senegal. The improvisational spirit of jazz replicates itself in the Kamoinge photographs that offer motion and poetry that emanate from a still image. “They created art that embodied racial pride and self-assertion at the same time that, like jazz, transcended boundaries of genre and race.”

Louis Draper had a vital leadership role within the group, “writing many introductions and histories of the Kamoinge Workshop, from handwritten manuscripts on looseleaf paper to typescript drafts and published summaries.” In his statement in Photo Newsletter, Draper wrote about the collective's efforts to self-organize to support themselves and to create a forum of peers who would view their artworks with “honesty and understanding.” An example of this forum of peers manifested as Kamoinge Workshop Portfolio No. 1 (1964) and No. 2 (1965), now at the Schomburg Center for Research in Black Culture. Fourteen out of fifteen of the members are featured in the portfolio, including Mannas. The Kamoinge portfolio “represents fifteen black photographers whose creative objectives reflect the concern for truth about the world, about society and about themselves.”

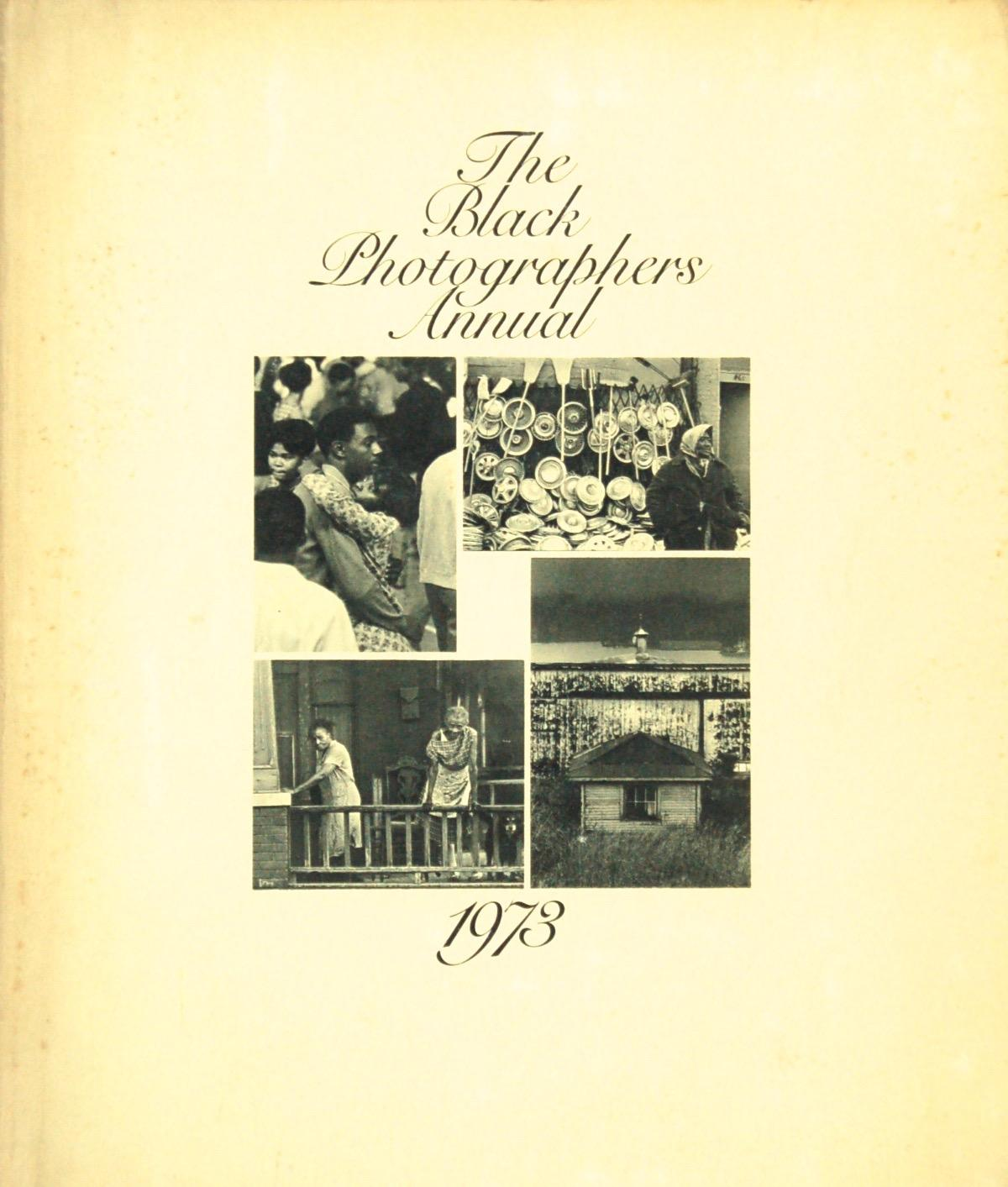
Cover photo of The Black Photographers Annual, Volume 1 (1973)

The collective continued to create open forums for themselves and other Black photographers outside the group. In 1973, Beuford Smith founded The Black Photographers Annual, a publication that featured photographs by Black artists, including Kamoinge members. With support from the book's editor, Joe Crawford, Smith published four volumes between 1973 and 1980, featuring written contributions by Toni Morrison, James Baldwin, and Gordon Parks. In Annual's first issue, the esteemed Morrison described the suite of individual works as "some of the most powerful and poignant photography I have ever seen." Stating, "It hovers over the matrix of black life, takes accurate aim and explodes our sensibilities." The publication had enlisted multigenerational voices, including P.H. Polk, a groundbreaking African American photographer, who was 74-years-old at the time. His ten-page portfolio of distinctive works documenting an earlier era preceding Mannas's. The Annual was “thought of as the realization of community in book form.” The publication circulated among young photographers such as Marilyn Nance and Dawoud Bey, who sought out the community that Kamoinge had engendered. Mannas' photographers appear in The Black Photographers Annual, Volume I (1973) and Volume 2 (1974).

After the success of the Annual, several Kamoinge Workshop members, including Mannas, Beuford Smith, and Shawn Walker, joined with other photographers in the community to throw a dinner honoring photography elders. “The organizers named themselves the International Black Photographers (IBP). Eighty photographers attended the inaugural dinner in 1979, each attendee presenting two photographs in a related exhibition.” Following these gatherings in 1979 and 1980, “IBP began publishing what they intended to be a quarterly newsletter in the winter of 1981.” An initiative led by Mannas, the International Black Photographers Newsletter was another example of the Kamoinge Workshop's interest in community-building on a much broader, international scale, stating: “We must build a membership organization so that we can provide a communication channel, through this newsletter, and a way for our own work to be shown..and preserved, through an archive and be an advocacy group for Black photographers.”

Another form of self-authorship came in the form of a larger publication called Timeless (2015), edited by Herb Robinson and Anthony Barboza and co-edited by Vincent Alablso. Published in 2015, Timeless offers reading of the Kamoinge Workshop in the new millennium. Mannas has five images from his time in Guyana, including his well-known images The Shy Girls of Anna Regina, circa 1971-1974 and Motown Lady, circa 1971–1976.

Since its founding, Kamoinge Workshop has provided many contemporary Black photographers, including Mannas, a community and creative support. The collective has been instrumental in shaping a Black aesthetic in photography, while shifting the photographic representations of African American culture.

== Artistic style and notable photographs ==
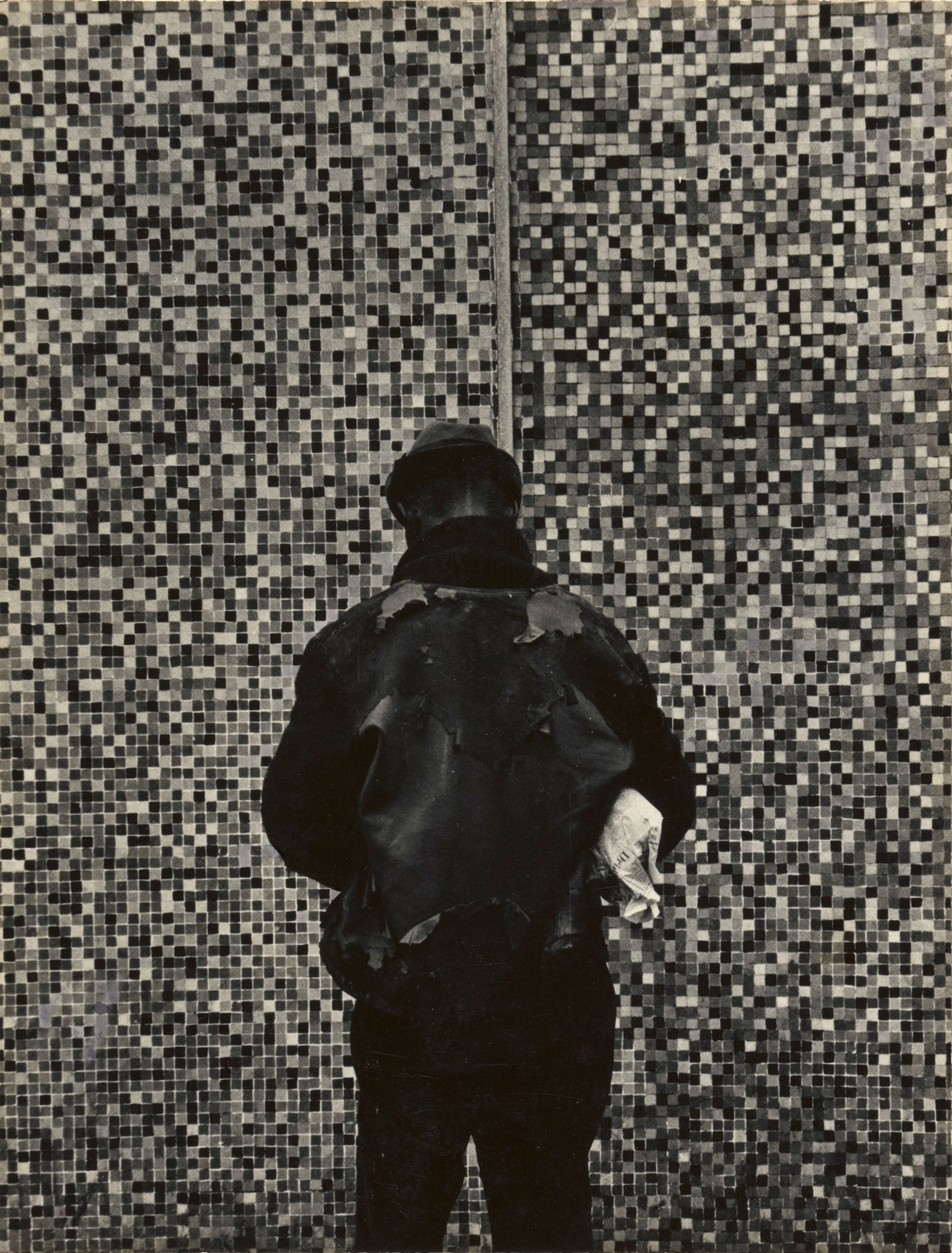
James "Jimmie" Mannas, No Way Out (1964)

Due to the influence of the Kamoinge Workshop, Mannas’ photographs span street, documentary, and abstract photography. Artworks such as No Way Out (1964), featured in the July 1966 issue of Camera Magazine, are examples of documentary and abstract photography present within Mannas’ practice. The image presents the back of an impoverished Black man with torn clothing, bowing his head in front of a gradient wall that engulfs his silhouette. The image offers a perspective of the Black male experience that confronts social and economic dispositions without exploiting one's image. Mannas recalls feeling sad when making and looking at this photograph because the wall acts as a physical and symbolic barrier between the man and his future.

Mannas’ photographs include figures captured in rich shades of black that emphasize their skin or feature a tonality that balances the darker edges of his pictorial frame. As seen in images like Untitled (Portrait of his Mother), circa 1966 and What Future? (1964), featured in the National Gallery of Art collection in Washington, D.C. Occasionally, his photographs take on a crop that he recalls fellow Kamoinge members not agreeing with but speaks to his artistic autonomy despite their collective influences.

Music Series

Mannas structured his exploration of photographic subjects into specific areas of focus. In his music series, he functioned as a fly on the wall, capturing the Free Jazz and Avant-garde movements of the 1960s. He observed cutting-edge musicians, including Ornette Coleman, Charles Mingus, Cecil Taylor, and Marzette Watts, as they pushed the improvisational boundaries of the genre.

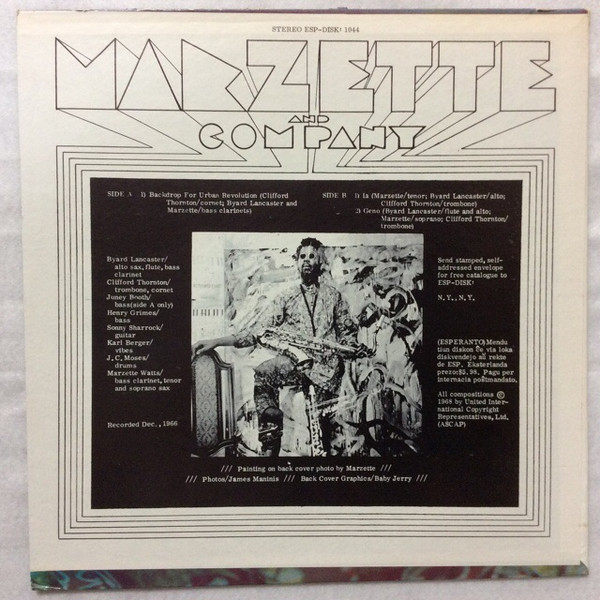
Image of Marzette Wattz by James "Jimmie" Mannas

Mannas became a part of this experimental music scene and a trusted member of Watts's entourage, thus gaining unprecedented access to photograph his professional and private lives. A low-angle torso image of Watts is featured on the 1966 ESP album Marzette Watts and Company: Backdrop for Urban Revolution (1966), which Mannas shot. It featured Watts playing the saxophone in front of one of his abstract paintings. However, he was incorrectly credited as "James Maninis." The image is featured on the back of the vinyl sleeve and on the records' label.

Drug Series

Mannas' "Drug Series" developed five years before his 1969 cinéma vérité film Kick, which examined the sweeping heroin usage prevalent in Harlem during that period. Mannas engages with his male subject's full humanity and persona in Quiet Shooting Up (1964), portraying his face and strapped arm. In Tying Up to Shoot (1964), Mannas pivots to an overhead depiction of isolated hands and limbs. The left hand injects the drug into the opposite arm, clearly bound and prepared. The glint of the needle and the clarity of four white fingernails optically resonate a powerful contrast to the blurred tile of the bathroom floor.

Years Abroad in Guyana

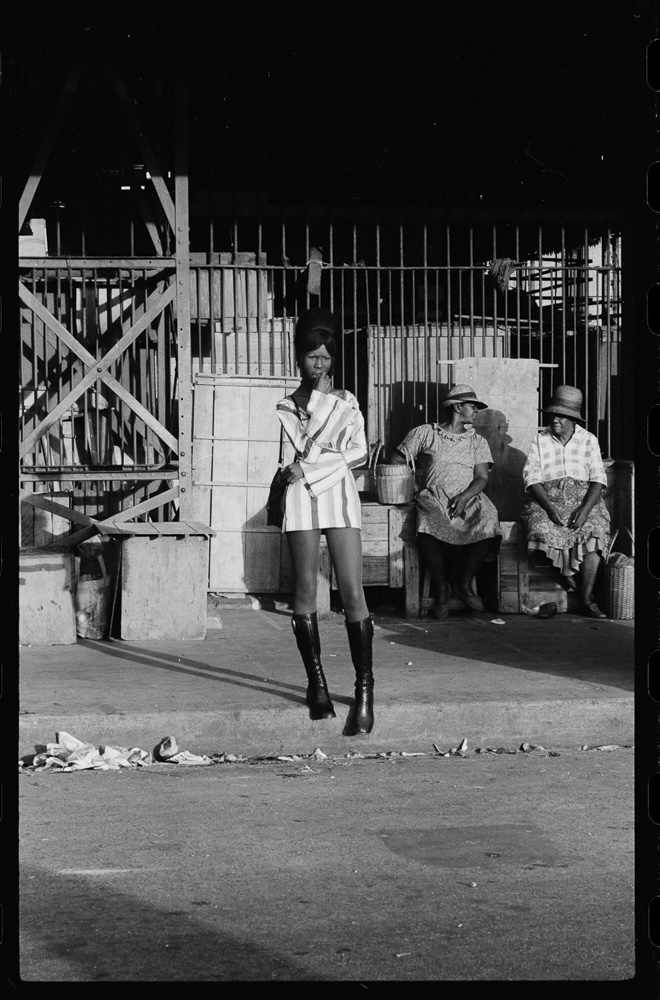
James Mannas, Motown Lady, c. 1971-1974

In the early 1970s, Mannas moved to Guyana, formerly known as British Guiana. He served as film advisor to the Ministry of Information, Culture, and Youth from 1971 to 1974 under Forbes Burnham, the country's first prime minister. Mannas' photographs and films made in Guyana were instrumental in shaping an identity for the newly independent nation. Photographs like Motown Lady, circa 1971–1974, is a visual example of a country shifting from a colonial framework into a new, modern world through the juxtaposition of women, labor, and fashion. The philosophies Mannas embodied from the Kamoinge Workshop complemented the autonomy that Burnham had envisioned for a post-colonial Guyana. Mannas's most notable images were born in Guyana, such as Peeping Seawall Beach Boy, Sea Wall, Georgetown, Guyana (1972) and Bag Lady, circa 1971–1974, featured in The Black Photographers Annual, Volume 2 (1974) and Timeless (2015). In Volume 2 of the Annual, Mannas reflects on the country's influence, stating, "The country is so exciting visually that it would take two or more years to come away with a complete image of it." The "Guyana Series," a visual record of his time spent in the country, comprises an extensive body of his still photography oeuvre. While in Guyana, Mannas worked with Guyanese photographers, taught classes there, and built studios and a darkroom with his colleague Bill Green.

== Films ==
In efforts to broaden his creative reach and garner more commercial opportunities, Mannas took up filmmaking. Following the assassination of Martin Luther King Jr. on April 4, 1968, Mannas took his camera to the street and documented the shock and anger felt in the Brooklyn neighborhood, Bedford Stuyvesant. His experimental film King Is Dead (1968) is a portrait of a community directly expressing their anger and pain, not only with the death of King, but with the abject realities for all black people throughout America. Mannas’ uses close-ups, cutaways and archival footage as key techniques in this black and white documentary. Mannas also made The Folks (1968–1969), a documentary focusing on nine residents in Bedford-Stuyvesant and Harlem. In 1970, they produced an animated film, Naifa, which presented a satirical view on integration.

Apart from taking photographs in Guyana, Mannas recorded films, including a short documentary on the award-winning artist Tom Feelings with his fellow Kamoinge member Danny Dawson called Head and Heart (1977). While in Guyana, Mannas became the managing director of Gillham Productions (1974–76). He wrote a screenplay adapted from a story by Frederick Hamley Case. The resulting movie, Aggro Seizeman (1975), is considered Guyana's first feature film with an all-Guyanese cast. It was shot on 35mm, and was co-directed by Mannas and Brian Stuart-Young. To support the production of Aggro Seizeman, Mannas invited Shawn Walker, Ray Francis, Danny Dawson, and Herman Howard to Guyana.

While studying at New York University (NYU), Mannas created Kick (1969). During his time at NYU, Mannas established Jymie Productions, his film company. Upon his return from Guyana, Mannas was awarded the National Endowment of Arts (NEA) grant in 1977 and 1978, which he used to support the production of a documentary on historic Black churches in Brooklyn.

== Selected exhibitions ==
2025

- Photography and the Black Arts Movement, 1955–1985 at the National Gallery of Art.

2022

- Working Together: Louis Draper and the Kamoinge Workshop, The J. Paul Getty Museum, Los Angeles, CA

2020

- Working Together: Louis Draper and the Kamoinge Workshop, Whitney Museum of American Art, New York, NY; Virginia Museum of Fine Arts, Richmond, VA

2016

- The Kamoinge Workshop, Kenkeleba Gallery, New York, NY

2006

- Kamoinge Workshop, Curated by Roy DeCarava, Nordstrom Department Stores

1998

- Subject Matters: Photography, Romana Javitz and the New York Public Library, New York Public Library Center for the Humanities, New York, NY

1994

- Kamoinge Workshop, Countee Cullen Library Branch of the New York Public Library, Harlem, NY

1975

- Inaugural Exhibition, International Center of Photography, New York, NY.

1973

- Black Photographers Annual Exhibit, San Francisco Museum of Modern Art, San Francisco, CA
- The Kamoinge Workshop, Harvard University Graduate School of Design, Cambridge, MA

1972

- The Kamoinge Workshop, University of Guyana, Georgetown, Guyana
- The Kamoinge Workshop, The Studio Museum in Harlem, New York, NY

1971

- Group Show, Amherst College, Amherst, MA

1970

- Solo Exhibit, Brooklyn Children's Museum, Brooklyn, NY

1965

- The Sight of the Young, Countee Cullen Library Branch of the New York Public Library, Harlem, NY

1966

- Perspective, Countee Cullen Library Branch of the New York Public Library, Harlem, NY
- The Negro Woman, The Kamoinge Gallery, Harlem, NY
- Group Show, University of Notre Dame, South Bend, IN

1965

- Group Show, Black Arts Repertory Theatre School, Detroit, MI
- Group Show, Howard University, Washington, D.C.
- Theme: Black, The Kamoinge Gallery, Harlem, NY

1961

- Theme: Final Man, Kamoinge Workshop, Glasgow Gallery, Harlem, NY

== Public Collections ==
- Museum of Modern Art, New York, NY
- Studio Museum in Harlem, New York, NY
- National Gallery of Art, Washington, D.C.
- National Museum of African American History and Culture, Washington, D.C.
- Virginia Museum of Fine Arts, Richmond, VA
- Howard University, Washington, D.C.
- Clark Atlanta University, Atlanta, GA
- New York Public Library, Schomburg Center, New York, NY
- New York Public Library, Stephen A. Schwarzman Building, New York, NY
- University of Mexico, Mexico City, MX
- University of Ghana, Accra, GN
- University of Dar es Salaam, Tanzania

== Filmography ==
A Pinch of Soul (2005), director

- An African American cooking series starring Pearl Bowser.

Head and Heart (1977) (short documentary), director and editor

- Head and Heart is a profile of the African American illustrator Tom Feelings, shot in Guyana in the 1970s. In the film, the artist describes his political ideologies that inform his artistic practice and his love for Black people and culture.

Aggro Seizeman (1975) (feature film), co-director with Brian Stuart-Young. Written by F. Hamley Case and screenplay by James "Jimmie" Mannas.

- The first Guyana-based feature film with an all-Guyanese cast. The film is about Alex Grant, nicknamed Aggro, who obtains a job as a repossession agent, otherwise known as a seizeman.

Ali the Fighter (1974), cinematographer

- A Williams Greaves' behind-the-scenes sports documentary chronicling the Fight of the Century between Joe Frazier and Muhammad Ali.

Young People (1972), director

- A film series for Guyana's Ministry of Information, Youth and Culture.

Naifa (1970), writer and director

- Naifa is the Swahili word for "nation," and the subject of this animated film is the growing spirit of Black nationalism. In a jar located in a toy store window, a black ball is harassed and outnumbered by white balls. The black ball duplicates itself and ceases to be overwhelmed by the white spheres. The black balls abandon the jar and establish an African-style village.

Kick (1969), director (short documentary)

- Following "a woman's efforts to help her husband overcome addiction," Kick documents this story against the backdrop of the heroin epidemic running rampant in 1960s Harlem.

The Folks (1968–1969), director

- A film series for NYU graduate program.

King Is Dead (1968), director (documentary)

- King Is Dead is a short documentary about the public reaction of residents of Bedford Stuyvesant, Brooklyn, following Martin Luther King Jr.'s assassination on April 4, 1968.

== Video Production ==
- Black Veterans for Social Justice, A Williams Greaves Production (1968), cameraman
- Mind Builders (1979–1981), teacher
- The Plight of Vietnam Black Vets (1983), director and cameraman
- The Cities (1984) WCBS-TV, photographer and cameraman
- Black News (1984) WNEW-TV, episodes - cameraman
- Museum of Broadcasting (1970–1971), consultant
- Brooklyn Museum (1970), consultant
- Bedford Stuyvesant Restoration Corporation (1969), film consultant

== Publications ==
Migan, Darla. "Participant Observers," Art in America, March 17, 2021.

Wallis, Brian. "The Belated Celebration of the Kamoinge Workshop," Aperture, January 14, 2021.

Mitter, Siddhartha. "Take Beautiful Pictures of Our People," New York Times, December 22, 2020.

Eckhardt, Sarah. Working Together: Louis Draper and the Kamoinge Workshop. Durham, North Carolina: Virginia Museum of Fine Arts, 2020. ISBN 978-1-934351-17-8.

Elizabeth Lewis, Sarah, ed. "Vision and Justice," Aperture, Issue 223, Summer 2016.

Schwendener, Martha. "What to See in New York Art Galleries This Week: Louis Draper and 'Timeless Photographs by Kamoing e,'" New York Times, February 4, 2016.

Meyers, William. "Kamoinge Creativity, Shadows, and Painted Portraits," Wall Street Journal, January 8, 2016.

Berger, Maurice. "Race, Civil Rights, and Photography: Kamoinge's Half-Century of African-American Photography,” New York Times, January 7, 2016.

Barboza, Anthony & Robinson, Herb, eds; Vincent Alablso, co-editor. Timeless: Photographers of Kamoinge. Atglen, Pennsylvania: Schiffer Publishing, Ltd., 2015. ISBN 978-0-7643-4974-4.

Duganne, Erina. The Self in Black and White: Race and Subjectivity in Postwar American Photography. Lebanon, New Hampshire: Dartmouth College Press. Published by University Press of New England, 2010. ISBN 978-1584658023.

Duganne, Erina. Gail Collins, Lisa & Natalie Crawford, Margo, ed. "Transcending the Fixity of Race: The Kamoinge Workshop and the Question of 'Black Aesthetic' in Photography," Thoughts on the Black Arts Movement. New Brunswick, New Jersey: Rutgers University Press, 2006. ISBN 978-0813536958.

Gysin, Fritz & Mulvey, Christopher, ed. Black Liberation in the Americas. Münster, Germany: Lit Verlag, 2001. ISBN 978-3825851378.

Taha, Halima. Collecting African American Art: Works on Paper and Canvas.New York, New York: Crown Publishing Group, 1998. ISBN 978-0517705933.

Wills, Deborah. An Illustrated Bio-Bibliography of Black Photographers 1940--1988. New York, New York: Garland Science, 1989. ISBN 978-0824083892.

Crawford, Joe, ed. Black Photographers Annual Vol. 2. Rochester, New York: Rapport Printing Corp., 1974. ISBN 0913564036.

Crawford, Joe, ed. Black Photographers Annual Vol. 1. Rochester, New York: Rapport Printing Corp., 1973.

Porter, Allan, ed. "Harlem: Kamoinge Workshop," Camera Magazine, Issue 7, July 1966.

H. Watts, Daniel, ed. "War on the Poor," Liberator, August 1965.

H. Watts, Daniel, ed. "The Myth of Negro Progress," Liberator, January 1964.

H. Watts, Daniel, ed. "Narcotics in the Ghetto," Liberator, February 1963.
