= The Sweet Breath of Life =

2004 book by Ntozake Shange

The Sweet Breath of Life: A Poetic Narrative of the African-American Family
- Author: Ntozake Shange
- Illustrator: Kamoinge Inc (photography)
- Cover artist: Kamoinge Inc.
- Genre: Poetry
- Published: 2004, Atria Books
- Media type: Print, ebook
- Pages: 192 pages
- ISBN: 978-0743478977

The Sweet Breath of Life: A Poetic Narrative of the African-American Family is a 2004 photographic poetic narrative by Ntozake Shange and the photography collective Kamoinge Inc. The Kamoinge Workshop was founded in New York in 1963 to support the work of black photographers in a field then dominated by white photographers. The book was first published on October 26, 2004, through Atria Books and was edited by Frank Steward, the president of Kamoinge Inc.

== Summary ==
The book depicts the various aspects of everyday urban African-American life through poetic narrative. Through poetic narrative and accompanying photographs, the book deals with various themes such as religion, identity, and representation.

== Contributing photographers ==
- Frank Stewart
- Anthony Barboza
- Adger Cowans
- Gerald Cyrus
- Louis H. Draper
- Albert Fennar
- Collette Fournier
- James Francis
- Steve Martin
- Toni Parks
- Herbert Randall
- Eli Reed
- Herb Robinson
- Beuford Smith
- Ming Smith
- June Truesdale
- Budd Williams

== Reception ==
Critical reception for The Sweet Breath of Life has been positive and reviewers have compared the work to that of Langston Hughes and Roy DeCarava.

Black Issues Book Review judges some of the photos to be outdated and that some of the poems felt more like journalism than poetry, but also that when the poems and photography worked together they were "powerfully made" and "breathtaking". Curve rated the book highly, citing the photography as one of the book's highlights. The Tri-State Defender praised the project as "a wonderful blend of words and images that give definition to the beauty and wonder of contemporary African-American culture."
