= Carrie Mae Weems =

African-American photographer (born 1953)

- Born: April 20, 1953 (age 73); Portland, Oregon, U.S.
- Education: California Institute of the Arts (BA); University of California, San Diego (MFA)
- Known for: Photography
- Awards: MacArthur Fellowship (2013), Anonymous Was a Woman Award (2007), Rome Prize Fellowship (2006), Pollock-Krasner Foundation Grant in Photography (2002), Honorary Fellowship of the Royal Photographic Society (2019), Hasselblad Award 2023.
- Website: www.carriemaeweems.net

Carrie Mae Weems (born April 20, 1953) is an American artist working in text, fabric, audio, digital images and installation video, and is best known for her photography. She achieved prominence through her early 1990s photographic project The Kitchen Table Series. Her photographs, films and videos focus on serious issues facing African Americans today, including racism, sexism, politics and personal identity.

She once said, "Let me say that my primary concern in art, as in politics, is with the status and place of Afro-Americans in the country." More recently, however, she expressed the view that "Black experience is not really the main point; rather, complex, dimensional, human experience and social inclusion ... is the real point." She continues to produce art that provides social commentary on the experiences of people of color, especially black women, in America.

Her talents have been recognized by Harvard University and Wellesley College, with fellowships, artist-in-residence and visiting professor positions. She taught photography at Hampshire College in the late 1980s and shot the "Kitchen Table" series in her home in Western Massachusetts. Weems is one of six artist-curators who made selections for Artistic License: Six Takes on the Guggenheim Collection, at the Solomon R. Guggenheim Museum in 2019/20. She is artist in residence at Syracuse University.

== Biography ==
=== Early life and education (1953–1980) ===
Weems was born in Portland, Oregon in 1953, the second of seven children to Carrie Polk and Myrlie Weems. She began participating in dance and street theater in 1965. At the age of 16, she gave birth to her only child, a daughter named Faith C. Weems.

Later that year (1970), she moved out of her parents' home and soon relocated to San Francisco to study modern dance with Anna Halprin at a workshop Halprin had started with several other dancers, as well as the artists John Cage and Robert Morris. Weems recalled, "I started dancing with the famous and extraordinary Anna Halprin. I was in Anna's company for I suppose, maybe a year or two ... experimenting with very deep parts of dance and ideas about dance. Anna was really interested in ideas about peace and using dance as a way to bridge different cultures together as a vehicle for multicultural expression ... I wasn't really so interested in dance, I just knew how to dance really well. I had a really, I think, deep sense of my body from a very early age." Thirty years later in 2008, Weems circled back to dance in her project Constructing History: A Requiem to Mark the Moment, at the Savannah College of Art and Design in Atlanta, noting "I'm just beginning this project of looking at blues and flamenco, and ideas about dance and movement."

She decided to continue her arts schooling and attended the California Institute of the Arts, in the Los Angeles metro, graduating at the age of 28 with a BFA degree. She received her MFA from the University of California, San Diego. Weems also participated in the folklore graduate program at the University of California, Berkeley.

While in her early twenties, Weems was politically active in the labor movement as a union organizer. Her first camera, which she received as a birthday gift, was used for this work before being used for artistic purposes. She was inspired to pursue photography after coming across The Black Photographers Annual, a book of images by African-American photographers including Shawn Walker, Beuford Smith, Anthony Barboza, Ming Smith, Adger Cowans and Roy DeCarava. This led her to New York City and the Studio Museum in Harlem, where she began to meet other artists and photographers such as Coreen Simpson and Frank Stewart, and they began to form a community. In 1976, Weems took a photography class at the Museum taught by Dawoud Bey and earned money as an assistant to Anthony Barboza. She returned to San Francisco, but lived bi-coastally and was invited by Janet Henry to teach at the Studio Museum and a community of photographers in New York.

=== 1980–2000 ===
First panel from Untitled (1996, printed 2020), National Gallery of Art, Washington, DC

In 1983, Weems completed her first collection of photographs, text and spoken word, called Family Pictures and Stories. The images told the story of her family, and she has said that in this project she was trying to explore the movement of black families out of the South and into the North, using her family as a model for the larger theme. Her next series, called Ain't Jokin', was completed in 1988. It focused on racial jokes and internalized racism. Another series called American Icons, completed in 1989, also focused on racism. Weems has said that throughout the 1980s she was turning away from the documentary photography genre, instead "creating representations that appeared to be documents but were in fact staged" and also "incorporating text, using multiples images, diptychs and triptychs, and constructing narratives." Sexism was the next focal point for her. It was the topic of one of her most well known collections called The Kitchen Table series which was completed over a two-year period (1989 to 1990), and has Weems cast as the central character in the photographs. About Kitchen Table and Family Pictures and Stories, Weems has said: "I use my own constructed image as a vehicle for questioning ideas about the role of tradition, the nature of family, monogamy, polygamy, relationships between men and women, between women and their children, and between women and other women—underscoring the critical problems and the possible resolves." She has expressed disbelief and concern about the exclusion of images of the black community, particularly black women, from the popular media, and she aims to represent these excluded subjects and speak to their experience through her work. These photographs created space for other black female artists to further create art. Weems has also reflected on the themes and inspirations of her work as a whole, saying,

... from the very beginning, I've been interested in the idea of power and the consequences of power; relationships are made and articulated through power. Another thing that's interesting about the early work is that even though I've been engaged in the idea of autobiography, other ideas have been more important: the role of narrative, the social levels of humor, the deconstruction of documentary, the construction of history, the use of text, storytelling, performance, and the role of memory have all been more central to my thinking than autobiography.

=== 2000–present ===
The Armstrong Triptych (from The Hampton Project) (2000) at the Walter E. Washington Convention Center in Washington, DC in 2022.

Weems remains active in the art world with her recent photographic project such as Louisiana Project (2003), Roaming (2006), Museums (2006), Constructing History (2008), African Jewels (2009), Mandingo (2010), Slow Fade to Black (2010), Equivalents (2012), Blue Notes (2014–2015) and the expanded bodies of works including installation, mixed media, and video project. Her recent project, Grace Notes: Reflections for Now, is a multimedia performance that explores "the role of grace in the pursuit of democracy." Her recent work Slow Fade to Black (2010) explores the lost image and memory of African-American female entertainers, including singers, dancers, and actresses, in the twentieth century by playing on the idea of cinematic fade. The freeze frame of a camera lens makes it impossible for us to tell whether or not those images are fading in or fading outs. The series of photos features a number of prominent female African-American artists from the last century, such as Marian Anderson and Billie Holiday, who faded out of our collective memory. The blurred images of the artists serves as metaphor of the on-going struggle for African-American entertainers to remain visible and relevant. In 2023 Weems became the first black woman to win the Hasselblad Award.

In September 2026, she was one of three guest editor for the October issue of Wallpaper*, focusing on race, memory and representation.

== Commissions ==
For the season 2020/2021 at the Vienna State Opera Weems designed the large-scale picture (176 sqm) Queen B (Mary J. Blige) as part of the exhibition series Safety Curtain, conceived by museum in progress.

In 2024, Bottega Veneta commissioned Weems to create an ad campaign that starred the rapper A$AP Rocky and his sons.

On February 6, 2026, the Obama Foundation announced that it had commissioned Weems to create a work for the Obama Presidential Center. Weems’s work will be a photographic collage The Cool Blue Wind that will be accompanied by original music.

== Art market ==
Weems has been represented by Jack Shainman Gallery since 2008.

== Publications ==
- Carrie Mae Weems: The Museum of Modern Art (N.Y.), 1995.
- Carrie Mae Weems : Image Maker, 1995.
- Carrie Mae Weems : Recent Work, 1992–1998, 1998.
- Carrie Mae Weems: In Louisiana Project, 2004.
- Carrie Mae Weems: Constructing History, 2008.
- Carrie Mae Weems : Social Studies, 2010.
- Carrie Mae Weems: Three Decades of Photography and Video, 2012.
- Carrie Mae Weems, Yale University Press, 2012. The first major survey of Weems's career, including a collection of essays from scholars in addition to over 200 of Weems's works.
- Carrie Mae Weems: Kitchen Table Series, 2016.
- Carrie Mae Weems: Reflections for now, 2023.

== Exhibitions ==
In 1993, the National Museum of Women in the Arts exhibited Carrie Mae Weems that displayed “a number of works that have never been seen before and features a selection of approximately 120 photographs and accompanying texts created from the late 1970s through 1992.” The exhibit was organized by Andrea Kirsh and Susan Fisher Sterling who also wrote the catalog (ISBN 978-0-940-97921-5). The exhibit was shown at the National Museum of Women in the Arts, Washington, D.C. (January 7–March 21, 1993) and later traveled to the Forum, Saint Louis (9 April–15 May); the San Francisco Museum of Modern Art (9 June–4 August); the Center for the Fine Arts, Miami (28 August–7 November); the California Afro-American Museum, Los Angeles (8 December 1993–28 February 1994); the Portland Art Museum (23 March–22 May); the Walker Art Center, Minneapolis (23 July–2 October); the Institute of Contemporary Art, Philadelphia (28 October 1994–8 January 1995); and the Contemporary Arts Center, Cincinnati (3 February–2 April 1995).

The first comprehensive retrospective of her work opened in September 2012 at the Frist Center for the Visual Arts in Nashville, Tennessee, as a part of the center's exhibition Carrie Mae Weems: Three Decades of Photography and Video. Curated by Katie Delmez, the exhibition ran until January 13, 2013, and later traveled to Portland Art Museum, Cleveland Museum of Art, and the Cantor Center for Visual Arts. The 30-year retrospective exhibition opened in January 2014 at the Solomon R. Guggenheim Museum in New York City. This was the first time an "African-American woman [was] ever given a solo exhibition" at the Guggenheim. Weems's work returned to the Frist in October 2013 as a part of the center's 30 Americans gallery, alongside black artists ranging from Jean-Michel Basquiat to Kehinde Wiley. In 2021, Weems presented The Shape of Things exhibit at the Park Avenue Armory.

Her first solo exhibition in Germany, shown in 2022 at the Württembergischer Kunstverein Stuttgart, is titled The Evidence of Things Not Seen.

In 2023, the Barbican Centre in London hosted Weems's first major UK exhibition, titled Reflections for Now and featuring photography and video installations from over three decades. Her work was also featured in the group show Spirit in the Land organized and exhibited with accompanying publication at the Nasher Museum of Art at Duke University in 2023, which later traveled to the Pérez Art Museum Miami in 2024. Carrie Mae Weems presented about her career trajectory at the Scholl Lecture Series, an artist's talk series, presented by PAMM, in February of 2024.

From September 22, 2023 — July 7, 2024 the Smithsonian American Art Museum (SAAM) exhibited Carrie Mae Weems: Looking Forward, Looking Back which two works that SAAM had recently acquired. The two works, Lincoln, Lonnie, and Me–A Story in 5 Parts (2012) and Constructing History (2008), were displayed a new gallery devoted to time-based media.

Weems's work was included in the 2025 exhibition Photography and the Black Arts Movement, 1955–1985 at the National Gallery of Art.

== Notable works in public collections ==
- Girl evidently the man plans on staying (1987), Museum of Fine Arts, Houston
- Kitchen Table Series (1990, printed 2003), National Gallery of Art, Washington, D.C.
- Shape of Things (female) (1993, printed 2000), Metropolitan Museum of Art, New York City
- See No Evil, Hear No Evil, Speak No Evil (1995), Museum of Contemporary Art, Los Angeles
- From Here I Saw What Happened and I Cried (1995–1996), Tate, London
- You Became an Accomplice (1995–1996), Museum of Modern Art, New York
- The Shape of Things (1996), Minneapolis Institute of Art; and Cleveland Museum of Art
- Untitled, after the Robert Gould Shaw Memorial (1996, printed 2020), National Gallery of Art, Washington, D.C.
- Untitled (Ella on Silk) (2014), Portland Art Museum
- The Blues (2017), Pérez Art Museum Miami

Mickalene Thomas and Weems talk with curator Eugenie Tsai about using their work to challenge conventional ideas of beauty, race, and gender (Brooklyn Museum, 2013)

== Awards ==
- Photographer of the Year by the Friends of Photography
- 2006: Rome Prize Fellowship
- 2007: Anonymous Was A Woman Award
- 2013: Congressional Black Caucus Foundation's Lifetime Achievement Award
- 2013: MacArthur Fellow, "Genius" Award
- 2014: BET Visual Arts Award
- 2014: Lucie Award
- 2015: ICP Spotlights Award from the International Center of Photography.
- 2015: Ford Foundation Art of Change Fellow
- 2015: W. E. B. Du Bois Medal from Harvard University
- 2015: Honorary Doctorate from the School of Visual Arts
- 2016: International Artist Award, Anderson Ranch Arts Center
- 2017: Honorary Doctor of Fine Arts degree from Syracuse University
- 2017: Inga Maren Otto Fellowship, The Watermill Center
- 2019: Honorary Fellowship of the Royal Photographic Society, Bristol
- 2020: Induction into the International Photography Hall of Fame and Museum
- 2022: National Medal of Arts for visual artist
- 2023: Hasselblad Award

== Personal life ==
Weems lives in Fort Greene, Brooklyn, and Syracuse, New York, with her husband Jeffrey Hoone.
