= Frank Stewart (artist) =

American photographer (born 1949)

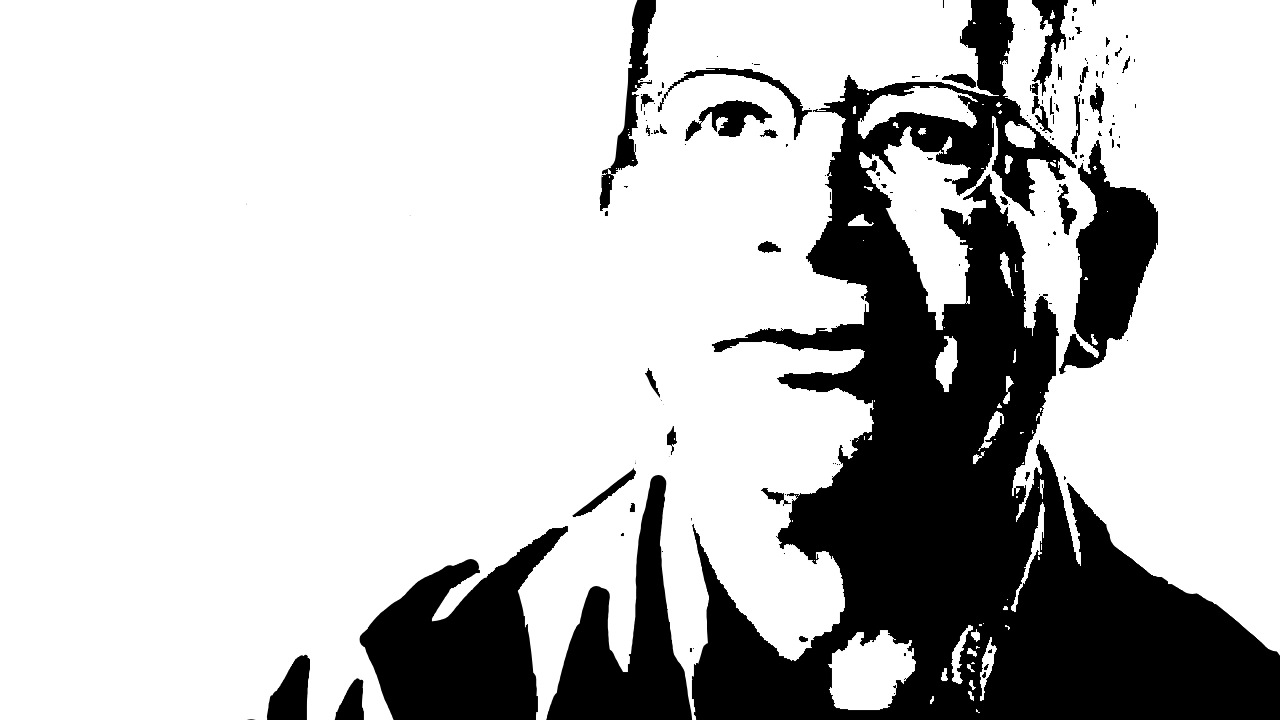
- Born: 1949 (75/76 years old); Nashville, Tennessee, U.S.
- Style: Photography
- Awards: photographic fellowship from the National Endowment for the Arts (twice), and a New York Creative Artist Public Service Award
- Website: http://frankstewartphoto.com

Frank Stewart (born 1949) is an African-American photographer based in New York. He is best known for photographing prominent Jazz musicians.

== Biography ==
Frank Stewart was born in 1949, in Nashville, Tennessee, and was raised in Memphis and Chicago. At the age of 14, he took his first photograph at the March on Washington for Jobs and Freedom. For most of his career, he has been a documentary photographer. With funding from two National Endowment for the Arts Grants, Stewart traveled the country photographing African American communities. In 1977, he was included as part of the first team of journalists allowed into Communist Cuba. Stewart worked closely with artist Romare Bearden, photographing him at home and at his studio, from 1975 until the artist's death in 1988. Stewart was invited by the Olympic Committee to be the official staff photographer for the 1984 Summer Olympics in Los Angeles. As part of Kamoinge, an African-American photography collective based in New York, he traveled to New Orleans' ninth ward to photo-document the devastation wrought by Hurricane Katrina in 2005. He was an adjunct professor of photography at the State University of New York (SUNY) at Purchase, and served as a consultant for the National Urban League.

Frank Stewart is best known for his jazz photographs. He got his start working on the road, touring clubs with jazz pianist and composer Ahmad Jamal in the mid-1970s. For almost 50 years, he has photographed some of the most notable jazz musicians including, Miles Davis, Dizzy Gillespie, Max Roach, Sonny Rollins, Dexter Gordon, Lionel Hampton, Roy Hargrove, Marcus Roberts, and Wynton Marsalis. Frank Stewart was the senior staff photographer for Jazz at Lincoln Center.

== Education ==
Stewart attended School of the Art Institute of Chicago, and received a BFA in Photography from Cooper Union in New York in 1975.

== Exhibitions ==
Frank Stewart's photographs have been featured in thirty solo shows and dozens of group exhibitions.

=== Selected solo exhibitions ===
- 2023 Frank Stewart's Nexus: An American Photographer's Journey, 1960s to the Present, The Phillips Collection, Washington, DC
- 2019 The Sound of My Soul: Frank Stewart's Life in Jazz, The Cooper Gallery, Harvard University, Cambridge, Massachusetts
- 2019 Time Capsule: Photographs by Frank Stewart, Gallery Neptune & Brown
- 2017 Their Own Harlems, The Studio Museum in Harlem
- 2016 Circa 1970, The Studio Museum in Harlem
- 2011 Traveling Full Circle: Frank Stewart's Visual Music, Jazz at Lincoln Center, New York
- 2009 The Contemporary Frank Stewart, Essie Green Galleries, New York
- 2005 Frank Stewart: Romare Bearden/The Last Years, High Museum, Atlanta, GA
- 2004 Frank Stewart, Jazz at Lincoln Center, Time Warner Building, NY, NY
- 1997 Frank Stewart: Riffs, Rectangles, and Responses: 25 Years of Photography, Leica Gallery, New York City

=== Selected group exhibitions ===
- 2025 Photography and the Black Arts Movement, 1955–1985: National Gallery of Art, Washington, D.C.
- 2010 Panopticon Gallery of Photography, Boston, MA
- 2009 Galerie Intemporel, Paris, France
- 2009 Sound: Print: Record, University Museums, Newark, Delaware
- 2006 Engulfed by Katrina, Photography Before & After the Storm, Nathan Cummings Foundation & NYU Tisch School of the Arts, NY
- 2005 Delta to Delta, Museum of Art and Origins, Harlem, New York
- 2005 Carnival, Cummings Foundation, New York
- 2004 Romare Bearden, Schomburg Center, New York
- 2003 Saturday Night Sunday Morning, Leica Gallery, New York City
- 2000 Harlem: A Group Exhibition, Leica Gallery, New York City UFA Gallery Presents Jazz Plus, Kamoinge Workshop, New York City
- 1999 Black New York Photographers of the 20th Century, Selections from the Schomburg Center Collections, New York City

== Collections ==
Frank Stewart's photographs are in the permanent collections of several major metropolitan museums, including the Smithsonian National Museum of African American History and Culture, the Museum of Modern Art (MoMA), and the High Museum.

== Honors and rewards ==
- National Endowment for the Arts Fellowship (twice)
- NIFFA Fellowship in 2002
- New York Creative Artist Public Service Award
- Jazz Journalists of America's Lona Foote-Bob Parent Award for Career Excellence

== Publications ==
- Frank Stewart’s Nexus: An American Photographer’s Journey, 1960s to the Present by Ruth Fine, et.al. (Rizzoli Electa, 2023) ISBN 978-0-847-89935-7
- Romare Bearden: Photographs by Frank Stewart (Pomegranate Communications Inc., 2004)
- The Sweet Breath of Life, poems by Ntozake Shange, photographs edited by Frank Stewart, photographs by Kamoinge (Simon & Schuster, 2004)
- Smokestack Lightning: Adventures in the Heart of Barbecue Country, written by Lolis Eric Elie with photographs by Frank Stewart (Farrar, Straus & Giroux, 1996)
- Sweet Swing Blues on the Road, written by Wynton Marsalis with photographs by Frank Stewart (W.W. Norton & Company, 1994).
