= Kamoinge Workshop =

Photography collective

The Kamoinge Workshop is a photography collective that was founded in 1963. In 2013, the group stood as “the longest continuously running non-profit group in the history of photography.” The collective was born when two groups of African-American photographers came together in collaboration. The first group, named Kamoinge was founded by Louis Draper, James "Jimmie" Mannas, Albert Fennar, and Herbert Randall. The second group, named Group 35 consisted of photographers Ray Francis, Earl Jones, Louis Draper, Herman Howard, Calvin Mercer, and Mel Dixon. Louis Draper was especially crucial to its founding. The first director of the group was Roy DeCarava, who led the collective from 1963 to 1965.

== Naming ==
Al Fennar suggested the newly united group of artists to name themselves Kamoinge, after reading Jomo Kenyatta’s book, written in 1962, called Facing Mount Kenya -- Kamoinge can be translated to “a group of people who are working together” from the Kikuyu language, which is spoken in Kenya primarily. The intent of the group is to cultivate a supportive and yet critical artistic community that captures black life in all of the photographers' vast experiences of it. Kamoinge member Deborah Willis is quoted in Timeless: Photographs by Kamoinge as saying “We have seen countless images of black life across the diaspora and I consider these photographs to be a mosaic of the black experience." The group as a unit captures photographs of black life in its complexity rather than in a stereotypical or clichéd manner.

== Membership ==
In late 1963, Kamoinge adopted members Herb Robinson, David Carter, Adger Cowans, and Anthony Barboza into the collective. Beuford Smith became a member in 1965, and the first female member to join the collective was Ming Smith, who joined in 1972—also in that year C. Daniel Dawson became a member.

In 2001, Collette V. Fournier, Budd Williams, and Eli Reed were invited by Kamoinge members to join the collective. In 2003, Spencer Burnett, June Truesdale, and Gerald Cyrus joined. In 2004, Mark Blackshear, Jerry Jack, and Russell K. Frederick joined, and in 2005 Salimah Ali, the group's second female member, and Radcliffe Roye joined. Also in 2004, Anthony Barboza became president of Kamoinge. In 2009 Darryl Sivad and Ronald Herd joined Kamoinge.

As of 2014, there had been 30 members of Kamoinge, including: Anthony Barboza (President), Adger W. Cowans (Vice President), Herb Robinson (Treasurer), Ronald Herard, Herbert Randall (founder), Collette V. Fournier, John Pinderhughes, Salimah Ali, Ming Smith, Beuford Smith (President Emeritus), Russell Frederick, Gerald Cyrus, June Truesdale, Mark Blackshear, C. Daniel Dawson, Shawn Walker (founder), Radcliffe Roye, Albert Fennar (founder), Darryl Sivad, Budd Williams, Jimmie Mannas, Eli Reed, and Frank Stewart. Deceased members include Louis Draper (founder and president from 1990 to 1997), James Ray Frances (founder), Steve Martin, Jerry Jack, Herman Howard, Calvin Wilson, and Toni Parks.

== Works, exhibitions, affiliations ==
From 1964 to 1965, Kamoinge members showed their work in two exhibitions titled Theme Black and The Negro Woman in a Harlem brownstone on a street known as Strivers Row. Since its founding in 1963, members of the collective have exhibited their works in the International Center of Photography, Countee Cullen Library, Harlem's Studio Museum, as well as a host of other sites. The collective has also hosted lectures and published numerous portfolios.

Kamoinge produced fifteen portfolios in its first year, ten of which were sent to institutions including The University of Ghana, Howard University, and Atlanta University, as well as to the Museum of Modern Art, Schomburg Library, and the Museum of Negro History.

In 1965, Roy DeCarava put on a solo show, titled US, at the Countee Cullen Library in Harlem. In 1969, he had a survey exhibition at the Studio Museum in Harlem titled Through Black Eyes, where he addressed the black experience in America and its relation to black aesthetic.

In 1972, Joe Walker, Joe Crawford, and Beuford Smith began to publish Kamoinge's work in the Black Photographers Annual. This work came out to make up four volumes and included artists from across the United States.

In 1974, Some of the photographs taken by members of Kamoinge were displayed at a gallery exhibit for the International Center of Photography, which caused the group to gain publicity.

In Harlem, NY, from 1998 to 1999, through the efforts of Kamoinge member Shawn Walkers, the collective became affiliated with the Institute for Youth Entrepreneurship (IYE).

In 2001, Kamoinge members Anthony Barboza and Beuford Smith were consultants to the Brooklyn Museum Exhibit, “Committed to the Image: A Half Century of Black Photography in America."

In 2004, Kamoinge Inc. published their first book, titled The Sweet Breath of Life. In 2006 Kamoinge's Mark Blackshear alongside artist Daniel Simmons curated “Black Music,” an exhibit for the Brooklyn Academy of Music (BAM).

In 2007, the first showing of “Revealing the Face of Katrina” at the HP Gallery at Calumet Photo, NY opened. The exhibition was curated by Kamoinge members Radcliffe Roye, C. Daniel Dawson, Russel Frederick, and John Pinderhughes. A second showing opened at the Gordon Parks Gallery at the College of New Rochelle at the Bronx Campus in 2009.

In 2013,Timeless: Photographs of Kamoinge by Anthony Barboza, Herb Robinson, Quincy Troupe, and Vincent Alabiso was published. The group had been collectively working on putting the book together since 2010.

“Working Together: The Photographers of the Kamoinge Workshop” exhibition will take place at the Whitney Museum of American Art from July until October 2020. The exhibition “chronicles the formative years of the Kamoinge Workshop” and “focuses on influential works of founding Kamoinge members during the first two decades of the collective." The exhibition will also be shown at the Virginia Museum of Fine Arts from February 1, 2020 - June 14, 2020.

== Reception ==
In July 1966, Swiss editor and photographer Allan Portei published a Kamoinge portfolio in an issue of Camera titled “Harlem,” despite the majority of pictures being taken outside of Harlem. Deborah Willis says in Timeless: Photographs by Kamoinge, “We have seen countless images of black life across the diaspora and I consider these photographs to be a mosaic of the black experience."

In 1972, Roy Gibson described the foundations of Kamoinge as deriving from “a common need to form black esthetic.” In 1996, Peter Gelassi said “The Harlem neighborhood was both its [Kamoinge’s] essential subject and intended principle audience,” despite few Kamoinge photographers living in or photographing Harlem exclusively. Beuford Smith, in a 2001 interview, reflected on the misconceptions of black aesthetic, noting, “I think black aesthetic is different for everyone… I think it is based on how you live as a black person."
