= Salimah Ali =

American photographer (born 1954)

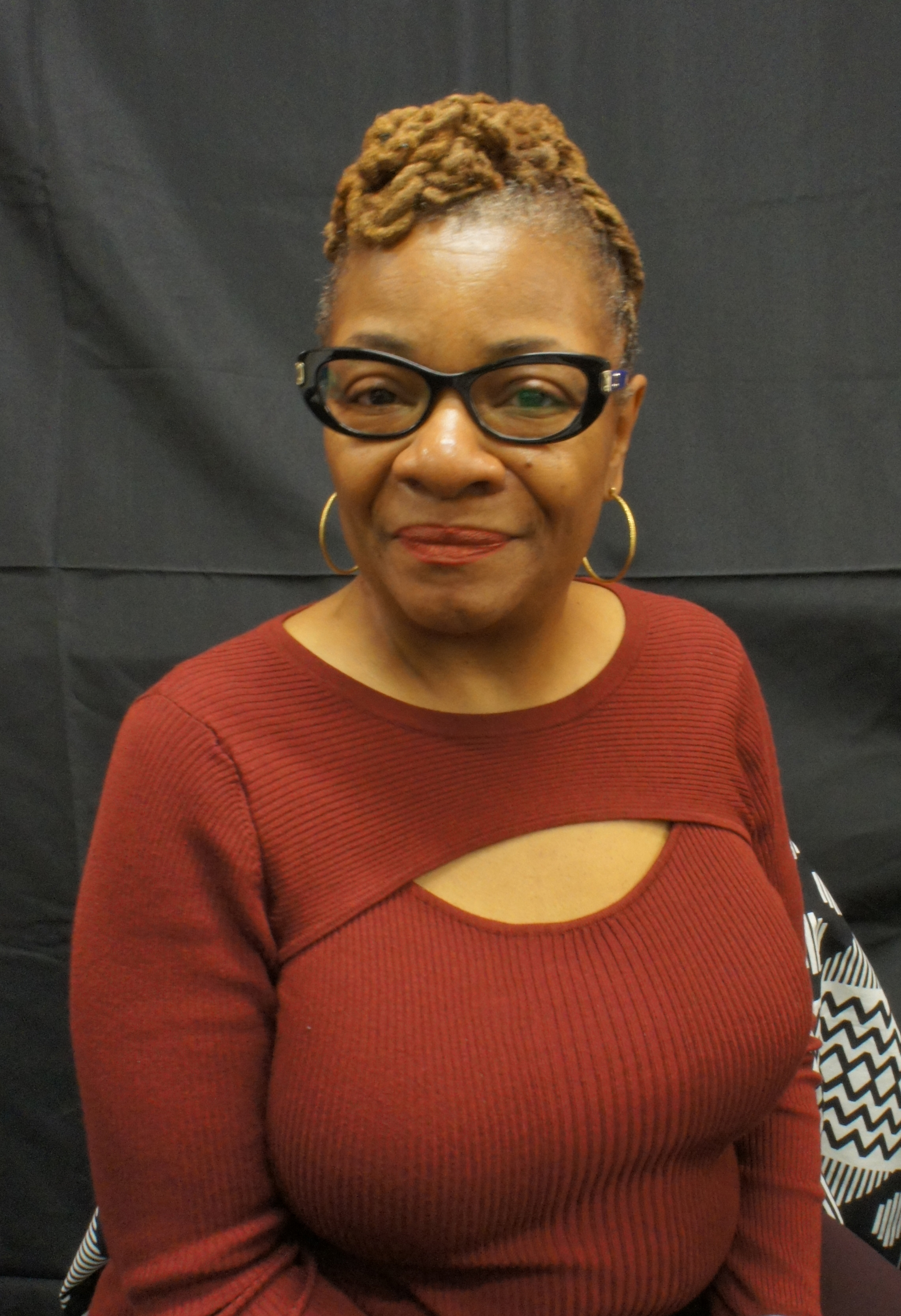
- Salimah Ali, 2010
- Born: 1954 (age 71–72); Harlem, New York City, U.S.
- Education: Fashion Institute of Technology
- Occupation: Photographer
- Awards: Shahin Shahablou Photography Award (London)

Salimah Ali (born 1954) is an American photographer working in portraiture, documentary photography, and photojournalism. She is a member of the Kamoinge Workshop, a collective of African American photographers founded in 1963, and was its second woman member after Ming Smith.

== Early life and education ==
Ali was born in 1954 in Harlem, New York City. She spent her childhood moving between Manhattan, Brooklyn, and Queens, including the Gowanus Houses in Brooklyn and the South Jamaica Houses in Queens. Her father, John Allen, was an oil painter who worked as a parts maker for Fairchild Industries; he had contracted polio as a child and remained largely self-taught as an artist. He introduced Ali to art from a young age and bought her her first camera.

After beginning her career with photographs of children and weddings, Ali received her first major assignment while a student at LaGuardia Community College. After seeing a poster for an Eddie Kendricks concert, she contacted the show's promoter for permission to photograph Kendricks; the resulting access led to commissions to photograph other musicians, including Stevie Wonder, Patti LaBelle, Earth, Wind & Fire, Bob Marley, Grace Jones, Eartha Kitt, and Teddy Pendergrass. Ali later transferred to the Fashion Institute of Technology, where she earned an associate's degree in photography.

== Career ==
Ali has worked as a freelance photographer since the late 1970s, with her photographs appearing in publications including Essence, Ms., Black Enterprise, USA Today, Newsday, The New York Times, the Los Angeles Times, and The Washington Post. Her photographs have also been published in books including Viewfinders: Black Women Photographers by Jeanne Moutoussamy-Ashe, Reflections in Black: A History of Black Photographers 1840 to the Present by Deborah Willis, Committed to the Image: Contemporary Black Photographers, Timeless: Photographs by Kamoinge, and MFON: Women Photographers of the African Diaspora.

Since 2005, Ali has been a member of the Kamoinge Workshop, becoming the collective's second woman member after Ming Smith. She was nominated by fellow Kamoinge member Collette V. Fournier. In 2007, Kamoinge received a grant from the Open Society Institute for the project Revealing the Face of Katrina, for which Ali photographed New Orleans residents amid the remains of homes destroyed by Hurricane Katrina.

Since 2001, Ali has worked as a staff photographer for the New York City Police Department, primarily producing booking photographs and official portraits.

Her ongoing series Darker Than A Paper Bag comprises portraits of dark-skinned subjects accompanied by personal narratives, examining colorism in the African American community.

== Exhibitions and collections ==
Ali's photographs have been exhibited at venues including The Studio Museum in Harlem, the Brooklyn Museum, the Soho Photo Gallery, the Aperture Gallery, the Jamaica Center for Arts and Learning, and the Schomburg Center for Research in Black Culture, which holds her work in its permanent collection. She won the inaugural Shahin Shahablou Photography Award in London.

In 2018, an installation of Ali's photographs was shown at the Queens Library as part of the first Southeast Queens Biennial. In 2019, her work was included in a group exhibition at the African American Museum in Philadelphia. In 2020, she participated in Visions 1020 at the Wilmer Jennings Kenkeleba Gallery in the East Village.
