= Herman Howard (photographer) =

American photographer (1942–1980)

- Born: 1942
- Died: 1980 (aged 37–38)
- Known for: Photography

Herman Howard (1942–1980) was an American photographer. He was a founding member of the Kamoinge Workshop.

His work is in the collection of the Museum of Modern Art.

Howard's work was included in the 2020 exhibition Working Together: The Photographers of the Kamoinge Workshop at the Whitney Museum of American Art. His was also included in the 2025 exhibition Photography and the Black Arts Movement, 1955–1985 at the National Gallery of Art.
