= The Sweet Flypaper of Life =

Book by Roy DeCarava and Langston Hughes

- Front cover of the first edition, with a photo by DeCarava and text by Hughes
- Authors: Roy DeCarava and Langston Hughes
- Language: English
- Set in: Harlem, New York City
- Publisher: Simon and Schuster
- Publication date: November 1, 1955
- Publication place: United States of America
- OCLC: 228684724

The Sweet Flypaper of Life is a 1955 fiction and photography book by American photographer Roy DeCarava and American writer Langston Hughes. DeCarava's photos and Hughes's story, told through the character Sister Mary Bradley, depict and describe Black family life in Harlem, New York City, in the 1950s.

== Overview ==
Hughes's story is narrated by the fictional Sister Mary Bradley, a grandmother of ten living in Harlem. It is set shortly after the US Supreme Court decision Brown v. Board of Education in May 1954, soon before DeCarava and Hughes began their collaboration. Early in the text, Bradley expresses her desire to see the outcome of the integration ordered by the court. The first of DeCarava's photos are close-ups of children and intimate scenes of Harlem family life. To match them, Hughes writes Bradley's monologue in Black Vernacular and has her begin with a description of her large family and their lives in Harlem. Her grandson Rodney is her favorite, despite his being unemployed and living in her basement.

Later, the photographs move outdoors and the narrative follows. DeCarava captures children playing in the spray of a fire hydrant; Hughes describes Rodney as the first to open them each summer. The images show portraits of Harlemites engaged in their occupations as Bradley expresses pride in the variety of work done by her family and race. Bradley's discussion of the changing nature of her neighborhood is set to photos of construction, picketing, and protests. At the end of the book, Bradley recalls falling ill and reflecting on the death of her first husband. Visited by her janitor, Bradley contemplates a new romance with him and insists that she will keep on living: "I done got my feet caught in the sweet flypaper of life—and I'll be dogged if I want to get loose."

== Background and publication ==
In 1952, DeCarava became the first Black photographer to receive a Guggenheim Fellowship, and he spent the next year taking a series of photos of daily life in Harlem. He photographed outdoor scenes in the city's streets, sidewalks, and stoops along with close-ups of individuals and families. DeCarava later said they "just accepted me and permitted me to take their photographs without any self-consciousness." He took around 2,000 such photographs. In July 1954, he brought a selection of his Harlem photos to the home of Hughes, who was known to provide advice to younger artists and writers. DeCarava showed Hughes approximately three to four hundred images.

Hughes was impressed with the photos and promised his support in getting them published. DeCarava's wife later quoted Hughes as saying: "'We've had so many books about how bad life is, maybe it's time to have one showing how good it is.'" He wrote to fellow Harlem Renaissance artist Aaron Douglas, who was unable to help, and to a series of New York publishers. Multiple publishing houses rejected the proposal, including Doubleday, despite its editor-in-chief describing DeCarava as "a Rembrandt of the camera". In late 1954, Hughes wrote to Simon & Schuster, which initially rejected the photo collection—co-founder Richard L. Simon described it as "unpublishable in book form"—before accepting on the conditions that the size of the book be small and that Hughes write an accompanying story. According to DeCarava,

Langston did not want to know any facts about the persons I had photographed on the streets. He told me he knew them already, although he had never met them. And of course he did! He said he would simply meditate on the pictures, and write what came into his head.

The book was published on November 1, 1955. It includes 140 of DeCarava's photographs. Hughes selected which photos to include. Simon & Schuster initially printed 3,000 cloth-bound books and 22,000 paperbacks, selling them for $2.95 (equivalent to $35 in 2025) and $1 ($12), respectively. DeCarava was crestfallen on seeing the small size of his photographs, describing the first edition as a "puny little book that you actually could put into your back pocket."

== Reception ==
DeCarava's disappointment with the quality of the printing was immediately assuaged by The Sweet Flypaper of Life's critical success upon release. It received positive reviews from publications including the New York Herald Tribune, the Los Angeles Tribune, the New York Age Defender, and the New York Times. The Times reviewer praised the union of photography and text and wrote that "chances are it could accomplish a lot more about race relations than many pounds of committee reports." They further wrote that "A book like 'The Sweet Flypaper of Life' should be bought by a great many people and read by a good many more." The Times also included it in its December list of 250 Outstanding Books of the Year. Arnold Rampersad, author of a Hughes biography, wrote in 1988 that "No book by Hughes was ever greeted so rhapsodically."

The initial printing run soon sold out, and the publisher printed a second run of 10,000 copies. The low pricing of the book led to low royalty payments to DeCarava and Hughes, and a lawsuit from one subject of DeCarava's photographs cost the pair $500 to settle. Despite the popularity of the book, it remained out of print for almost twelve years. Shortly before Hughes's death in May 1967, DeCarava notified him that a patron was supporting a second edition of the book. It was published in November by Hill & Wang. From 1983 to 2018 the book was reprinted four times, including a 2018 publication by First Print Press. That year critic Sean O'Hagan described the book as "a pioneering exercise in merging image and text as well as a revealing glimpse into the everyday lives of Harlem's black community."

== Analysis ==
Since its publication, the book has not been extensively analyzed by critics. In 1993 Thadious M. Davis compared the book to Twelve Million Black Voices (1941), a collaboration between the author Richard Wright and the photographer Edwin Rosskam. Davis studied Hughes's decision to use the fictional Mary Bradley as the book's narrator, noting that for Hughes the Black woman played a major part in keeping traditions and memories alive. Sister Mary specifically provides a window through which to view the society of Harlem. Three years later Maren Stange wrote that Hughes's story was "A conscious moc- and anti-documentary," which chronicled Mary's life as a way to present life in Harlem. Peter Galassi felt that Hughes's words "mask[ed] the eloquence of photographs so complete in themselves that they require no elucidation", noting that some of DeCarava's best images saw their power "dilute[d]" in order to fit with the text. In 2012 the scholar Sonia Weiner analyzed the book for the connection between art and prose it creates.
