= Ray Francis (photographer) =

American photographer (1937–2006)

- Born: 1937
- Died: 2006 (aged 68–69)
- Known for: Photography

James Ray Francis (1937 – 2006) was an American photographer. He was a founding member of the Kamoinge Workshop in New York.

Francis's work was included in the 2020 exhibition Working Together: The Photographers of the Kamoinge Workshop at the Whitney Museum of American Art. Francis's work was also included in the 2025 exhibition Photography and the Black Arts Movement, 1955–1985 at the National Gallery of Art.

His work is in the collection of the Museum of Modern Art, and the National Gallery of Art.

In 2024 a retrospective of his work Waiting to Be Seen: Illuminating the Photographs of Ray Francis was held at the Bruce Silverstein Gallery.
