= Herb Robinson =

American photographer born 1942

- Born: 1944 (age 81–82); Kingston, Jamaica
- Known for: photography
- Website: herbrobinsonphotography.com

Herb Robinson (born 1944) is a Jamaican-born American photographer.

Robinson was born in 1944 in Kingston, Jamaica. He moved to New York as a child. He studied at City College of New York and the Fashion Institute of Technology. He was a member of the Kamoinge Workshop.

In 2022 Robinson's work was included in the exhibition Working Together: The Photographers of the Kamoinge Workshop organized by the organized by the Virginia Museum of Fine Arts. Robinson's work was included in the 2025 exhibition Photography and the Black Arts Movement, 1955–1985 at the National Gallery of Art.

His work is the collections of Museum of Modern Art, the National Gallery of Art, and the Whitney Museum of American Art.
