= Shawn Walker (photographer) =

American photographer (born 1940)

- Born: 1940 (age 85–86); New York City
- Known for: photography, filmmaking

Shawn Walker (born 1940) is an American photographer and filmmaker. He is a founding member of the Kamoinge Workshop.

In 2018 the Steven Kasher Gallery held a retrospective of his work.

In 2022 Walker's work was included in the exhibition Working Together: The Photographers of the Kamoinge Workshop organized by the organized by the Virginia Museum of Fine Arts. Walker's work was included in the 2025 exhibition Photography and the Black Arts Movement, 1955–1985 at the National Gallery of Art. His photographs are in the collection of the Museum of Modern Art, Whitney Museum of American Art.

In 2020 the Library of Congress obtained Walker's artifacts of the Kamoinge Workshop as well much of his personal archive.
