= Ming Smith =

African-American photographer

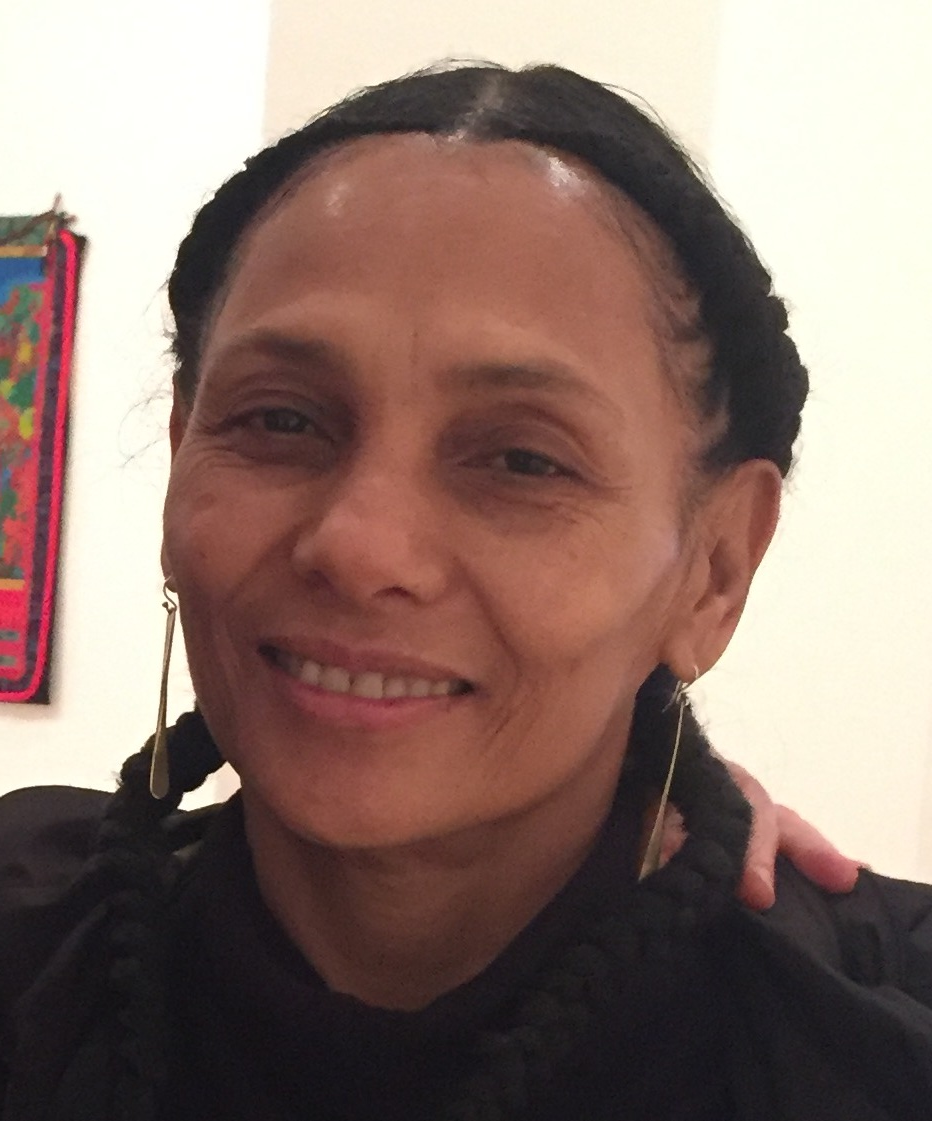
- Smith at Brooklyn Museum
- Born: Detroit, Michigan, U.S.
- Education: B.S. Howard University, Washington, DC (1973)
- Occupations: Photographer, artist
- Website: mingsmithstudio.com

Ming Smith is an American photographer. She was the first African-American female photographer whose work was acquired by the Museum of Modern Art (MOMA) in New York City.

== Biography ==
Smith was born in Detroit, Michigan, and raised in Columbus, Ohio. Her father was a pharmacist, with a passion for photography, who inspired her own photography. Smith was a pre-med, microbiology major at Howard University. After graduating from Howard University in 1973, she moved to New York City, where she found work modeling. In her early days of photographing in New York, she met photographer Anthony Barboza, who was an early influence on her.

== Artistic style ==
Smith's approach to photography has included in-camera techniques such as playing with focus, darkroom techniques like double exposure, collage techniques and paint on prints. Her work is less engaged with documentation of events than with expression of experience. It has been described as surreal and ethereal, as The New York Times observed: "Her work, personal and expressive, draws from a number of artistic sources, preeminently surrealism. She has employed a range of surrealist techniques: photographing her subjects from oblique angles, shooting out of focus or through such atmospheric effects as fog and shadow, playing on unusual juxtapositions, even altering or painting over prints." Smith's early work was composed of photos that were shot quickly to produce elaborate scenes, and due to this process many of her photos have double dates. She has used the technique of hand-tinting in some of her work, notably her Transcendence series.

Some of Smith's work displayed in the Museum of Modern Art depicts motherhood in Harlem. These photos are taken using a documentary style of photographing these subjects.

== Career ==
Smith has photographed many important black cultural figures during her career, including Alvin Ailey and Nina Simone. In 1973, Smith was featured in the first volume of the Black Photographers Annual, a publication closely affiliated with the Black Arts Movement of the 1960s and early 1970s. Smith had her first exhibition at Cinandre, a hairdressing salon, in 1973 as well. At Cinandre, she met Grace Jones, whom she photographed wearing a black and white tutu on occasion. Smith recalls that she and Jones would talk about surviving as black artists. Smith reflects on the memories by saying: "We came out of Jim Crow. And so just coming to New York and trying to be a model or anything was new."

Two years later (1975), Smith became the first female member of the Harlem-based photography collective Kamoinge, under director Roy DeCarava. The Kamoinge Workshop was founded in New York in 1963 to support the work of black photographers in a field then dominated by white men. The collective, which still exists today, has undertaken a range of initiatives, including exhibitions, lectures, workshops, and the publishing of portfolios for distribution to museums. Smith participated with Kamoinge in three groups shows in New York and Guyana.

Smith dropped off a portfolio at the Museum of Modern Art (MOMA), where the receptionist mistook her for a messenger. When she returned, she was taken into the curator's office. Susan Kismaric named a price for Smith's work, which Smith declined because the price did not even cover her materials. Kismaric asked Smith to reconsider, which she eventually did. Shortly after, she became the first Black woman photographer to be included in the collections of the Museum of Modern Art in New York City. In addition to the MOMA, Smith's art has been featured at the Schomburg Center for Research in Black Culture and the Smithsonian Anacostia Museum & Center for African American History and Culture in Washington, D.C.

Smith's photographs are included in the 2004 Ntozake Shange book The Sweet Breath of Life: A Poetic Narrative of the African-American Family and Life.

== Exhibitions ==
Smith has twice exhibited at the Bellvue Hospital Centre in Morristown, New Jersey, through their Art in the Atrium exhibitions. The first was in 1995, for Cultural Images: Sweet Potato Pie, an exhibit curated by Russell A. Murray. In 2008, she contributed as part of the exhibition New York City: In Focus, part of Creative Destinations 2008 Exhibition of African American Art.

In 2010, her work was included in MOMA's exhibition Pictures by Women: A History of Modern Photography. This exhibition recontextualized Smith's work alongside that of Diane Arbus and marked a growing interest in Smith's work. Organized by curator Roxana Marcoci, it was curated by Sarah Meister through the Department of Photography. In 2017, a major survey exhibition of Smith's work was held at the Steven Kasher Gallery in New York. The exhibition featured 75 vintage black-and-white prints that represented Smith's career.

Smith has collaborated with filmmaker Arthur Jafa in the Serpentine Sackler Gallery's 2017 show, Arthur Jafa: A Series of Utterly Improbable, yet Extraordinary Renditions (Featuring Ming Smith, Frida Orupabo and Missylanyus). That same year, Smith was featured in the Tate Modern group exhibition Soul of a Nation: Art in the Age of Black Power, curated by Mark Godfrey and Zoé Whitley. The show received international acclaim, before traveling to Crystal Bridges Museum of American Art, Brooklyn Museum, The Broad, the de Young Museum of San Francisco and the Museum of Fine Arts, Houston. Since then, Smith's work has been featured in solo presentations by Jenkins Johnson Gallery both at Frieze New York and Frieze Masters in 2019, the former of which receiving the Frieze Stand Prize.

Smith's work was included in the 2025 exhibition Photography and the Black Arts Movement, 1955–1985 at the National Gallery of Art.

== Collections ==
Smith's work is held in the following permanent collections:

- Brooklyn Museum of Art: 1 print (as of 3 May 2023)
- Philadelphia Museum of Art: 5 prints (as of 3 May 2023)
- Whitney Museum of American Art: 6 prints (as of 2 April 2023)
