= Sanford R. Leigh =

American activist

Sanford Rose Leigh (born 1934, Bridgeport, Connecticut), also known as Sandy Leigh (and after his amnesia Guy Wilson) was an activist during the Civil Rights Movement and the director of the largest project in Mississippi Freedom Summer, the Hattiesburg Project.

== Early life ==
Leigh was born in 1934, in Bridgeport, Connecticut to West Indian parents who died in an automobile accident when he was in his teens. His older sister and her husband assumed his care. After college, and Reserve Officers' Training Corps, Leigh, who was fluent in five languages, attended Army Language School at Yale, served as a lieutenant, mostly at Fort Leonard Wood, and rose to captain. He then worked as a technical writer in Connecticut.

Leigh became the assistant to Bayard Rustin, when Rustin was organizing the 1963 March On Washington. After the March, Leigh joined the Student Nonviolent Coordinating Committee in Atlanta. In SNCC he worked at times with Communications Director, Julian Bond, and manned the WATS-line. WATS was SNCC's main means of communicating with the activists in the hamlets of the South. WATS saved money and had the advantage of avoiding putting calls through the local telephone operators, who could listen to the calls and were often very friendly with the constabulary and the Ku Klux Klan. Leigh could type 120 words a minute and his efficiency and competence made him invaluable to the organization.

== The Hattiesburg Project ==
In January 1964, Leigh went to Hattiesburg, Mississippi to work on Freedom Day, a massive Voting Rights action in the town. Shortly thereafter, when a SNCC Field Secretary had to leave the Hattiesburg project, it was felt that Leigh's maturity, diplomacy and firmness made him the best candidate for the job. He became almost a son to Mrs Lenon E. Woods, who sponsored the project by housing the office downstairs from her Woods Guest House, in which she lived. Hers was the only "Negro" hotel — the only lodging for African-American travelers — in all Southern Mississippi. Mrs Woods owned most of the land under the Negro business district of Hattiesburg. She was also a silent partner as a landowner in parts of the White downtown area, which she, as a person of color, could not own publicly. On the eve of Freedom Day, Mrs Woods chased off a crowd of lawmen, firemen and city officials who had come to arrest Leigh just before the massive Voter Registration drive.

Under Leigh, the Hattiesburg Project grew to be the largest and most diverse in Mississippi Freedom Summer. It had seven Freedom Schools, two community centers and three libraries (persons of color could not use the town library and had no borrowing privileges). The Freedom Summer project provided legal services donated by lawyers from three organizations, medical services provided by specialists who rotated through, usually during their summer vacations, and teams of ministers who came to work on voter registration under the direction of Rev. Bob Beech of the National Council of Churches Ministry, which also sponsored a local Ministers' Union.

Leigh also helped manage the U.S. Senate campaign of Mississippi Freedom Democratic Party candidate Victoria Gray Adams who sought to oppose the segregationist, John Stennis. Mississippi Freedom Democratic Party registered Negro voters, who were barred from voting in Mississippi, and ran candidates opposing the Democratic Party nominees. The campaign was to challenge the Mississippi Democratic Party at the 1964 convention in Atlantic City. The segregationist Democratic Party ran the state, and MFDP sought to unseat them and show the national party that people of color would be a voting bloc equal to the segregationists, if allowed to register to vote.

When the Department of Economic Opportunity launched Head Start in 1965, newspapers, segregationist congressmen, and local governments denounced it as a Communist conspiracy. Leigh managed the program in Southeastern Mississippi. Head Start was a natural successor to the Freedom Schools. Funding was controlled through local governments, which tried to sabotage the program. They refused the grants and funding. In Congress and locally, governments struggled to wrest control from the local people who had staffed the new program.

== Later life ==
Leigh later worked as aide de camp for Stokeley Carmichael until Carmichaels' marriage to Miriam Makeba. He then became an assistant to Walter Washington, the first Black Mayor of Washington, DC. Leigh relocated to New York, was employed as an Administrative Assistant by Bechtel, and as an organist at the Abyssinian Baptist Church.

In 1972 police found Leigh in a subway in Harlem, brutally beaten. He developed amnesia, and his friends searched in vain for six months, until he told Harlem Hospital social workers the name someone called him in a dream. When he began to regain his memory he was found beaten near his room in the YMCA in 1974. He sustained brain damage, never recovered his memory, and was placed in adult home care.
