= Herbert Randall =

American photographer (born 1936)

Herbert Eugene Randall Jr. (born December 16, 1936, in the Bronx) is an American photographer who had documented the effects of the Civil Rights Movement. Randall is of Shinnecock, African-American and West Indian ancestry.

== Education ==
Randall studied photography under Harold Feinstein in 1957. From 1958 to 1966, he worked as a freelance photographer for various media organizations. His photographs were used by the Associated Press, United Press International, Black Star, various television stations, and other American and foreign publications. Randall was also a founding member of the Kamoinge Workshop, a collective of African-American photographers, in New York City in 1963.

== Freedom Summer ==
In 1964, Sanford R. Leigh, the Director of Mississippi Freedom Summer's Hattiesburg project, persuaded Randall to photograph the effects of the Civil Rights Movement in Hattiesburg, Mississippi. Randall had a Whitney Fellowship for that year, and had been looking for a project. He spent the entire summer photographing solely in Hattiesburg, among the African-American community and among the volunteers in area projects such as the Freedom Schools, Voter Registration, and the Mississippi Freedom Democratic Party campaign.

Only five of Randall's photographs were published in the summer of 1964. One seen worldwide was the bloodied, concussed Rabbi Arthur Lelyveld, head of a prominent Cleveland congregation and former conscientious objector to World War II. However, most of his photographs sat in a file at the Shinnecock Reservation, on Long Island, New York.

In 1999, Randall donated 1800 negatives to the archives of The University of Southern Mississippi in Hattiesburg. He and Bobs Tusa, the archivist at USM, wrote Faces of Freedom Summer, which was published by the University of Alabama Press in 2001. Faces is the only record of a single town in the midst of the Civil Rights revolution in America. At the time, the Hattiesburg Project was overlooked and unpublicised by the Civil Rights Movement.

== Later Work ==
Randall returned to New York after Freedom Summer, to continue his career in photography. He served as Coordinator of Photography for the New York City Board of Education and as a Photographic Consultant to the National Media Center Foundation. He was awarded the Creative Artist's Public Service Grant for Photography for 1971–72.

Randall's photographs have appeared in exhibitions at the San Francisco Museum of Modern Art, The Brooklyn Museum, The Art Institute of Pittsburgh, and other notable museums. His photographs are in the permanent collections of the Metropolitan Museum of Art, the Museum of Modern Art, Brooklyn Museum and Parrish Art Museum. He has also served on numerous museum boards.

Randall's work was included in the 2025 exhibition Photography and the Black Arts Movement, 1955–1985 at the National Gallery of Art.

== Publications ==
- Faces of Freedom Summer / photographs by Herbert Randall; text by Bobs M. Tusa; foreword by Victoria Jackson Gray Adams and Cecil Gray. Tuscaloosa : University of Alabama Press, c2001. ISBN 0-8173-1056-8

== See also ==
- List of photographers of the civil rights movement
