= Eli Reed =

American photographer born 1946

- Born: 1946 (age 79–80); Perth Amboy, New Jersey
- Other names: Ellis, Eli
- Occupations: Photographer & Photojournalist
- Known for: First black photographer at Magnum Agency, Photojournalism

Ellis (Eli) Reed (born 1946) is an American photographer and photojournalist. Reed was the first full-time black photographer to join Magnum Agency and is the author of several books, including Beirut: City of Regrets and Black In America.

== Early life and education ==
Reed was raised in Perth Amboy, New Jersey. He took his first photograph at the age of 10, documenting his mother by the Christmas tree. He earned a degree in illustration in 1969 from the Newark School of Fine and Industrial Art, but attributes his direction as a photographer to mentor Donald Greenhaus rather than to formal studies. In 1982–83 he was a Nieman Fellow at Harvard University, studying political science and urban affairs at the Kennedy School of Government.

== Career ==
Reed became a freelance photographer in 1970. After photographing military conflict in Central America, he joined Magnum Photos, becoming its first full-time black member. While working for the San Francisco Examiner, he was a runner-up for the 1982 Pulitzer Prize for Feature Photography for documentation of life in a public housing project.

While a Nieman Fellow, he made his first journey to Beirut to photograph the Lebanese Civil War; he returned there several times and was once mistaken for a militant and kidnapped. In 1988 he published Beirut: City of Regrets. He also covered the 1986 Haiti coup against "Baby Doc" Duvalier, the 1989 US military action in Panama, and unrest in Zaire in 1992, as well as the Million Man March and African-American life in the US. His book Black in America, which also includes poetry by Reed, was published in 1997; several photographs from that project have been recognized in juried shows and exhibitions.

Reed has also worked as a still photographer for the film industry, and is a member of the Society of Motion Picture Still Photographers.

In January 2005 Reed became the clinical professor of photojournalism at The University of Texas at Austin. He has also taught at the Maine Photographic Workshop; the Wilson Hicks Symposium, Miami University; the Southeastern Museum of Photography, Daytona, Florida; the Smithsonian Institution; San Francisco State University; Harvard University; Boston Institute of Art; the Academy of Fine Art, San Francisco; Columbia University; Empire State College, New York; New York University; and the International Center of Photography, New York; as well as an annual photojournalism workshop for the United States Department of Defense.

Reed mainly uses the Olympus E-3, E-30, and EP-1 for his work. He is a Sony Global Imaging Ambassador. In October 2015, Reed was invited to speak at the Schomburg Center for Research in Black Culture as part of their "Visually Speaking" series. In January 2016, he was a keynote speaker at National Geographic Magazine's Photography Seminar in Washington, D.C.

Reed's work was included in the 2025 exhibition Photography and the Black Arts Movement, 1955–1985 at the National Gallery of Art.

== Awards ==
- 1992 W. Eugene Smith Grant in Documentary Photography
- 1992 Kodak World Image Award for Fine Art Photography
- 1988 World Press Photo award
- 1988 Leica Medal of Excellence
- 1983 Overseas Press Club Award
- 1982 Nieman Fellowship at Harvard
- 1981 Mark Twain Associated Press Award
- 1981 Pulitzer Prize, runner-up
- 2011 Lucie Foundation Award for Documentary Photography

== Exhibitions ==
- 1973, The Black Photographer, Syracuse University
- 1973, New Jersey Photographs
- 1975, New Jersey Prisons, Newark Museum of Art
- 1975, The Whole Sick Crew, Newark-Rutgers University
- 1993, Visa pour l'image, Perpignan, France
- 1996, Bruce Museum, Greenwich, Connecticut (first major solo exhibition by a living artist)
- 1997, Leica Gallery, New York
- 1997, Magnum World exhibition and catalogue
- 1999, Black New York Photographers of the 20th Century Exhibition, Schomburg Center for Research in Black Culture
- 2000, Indivisible
- 2000, Reflections in Black, and A History of Black Photographers 1840 to the Present, Smithsonian Museum, Washington, D. C.
- 2014, Eli Reed Retrospective, A Long Walk Home, Leica Gallery, New York
- 2014, 2015, Visa pour l'image Festival Du Photoreportage, Perpignan, France

== Publications ==
- John Singleton, Poetic Justice: Film Making South Central Style. United States: Delta, 1993. ISBN 978-0-385-30914-1
- Tom Rankin, Local Heroes Changing America, New York: W. W. Norton & Company, Inc., 2000. ISBN 978-0-393-05028-8
- Homeless in America, 1987.
- Black in America, New York: W. W. Norton & Company, Inc., 1997. ISBN 978-0-393-03995-5
- Beirut: City of Regrets, New York: W. W. Norton & Company, Inc., 1988. ISBN 978-0-393-30507-4
- A Long Walk Home, Austin: University of Texas Press, 2015. ISBN 978-0292748576

== Films ==
=== Production ===
- 1988 America's Children: Poorest in the Land of Plenty, photo essay for NBC.
- 1992 Getting Out, director, produced for Tokyo TV, shown at the New York Film Festival

=== Specials/stills ===
- 1991 The Five Heartbeats, stills, directed by Robert Townsend
- 1992 Poetic Justice, stills, directed by John Singleton
- 1994 Higher Learning, stills, directed by John Singleton
- 1995 Kansas City, stills and specials, directed by Robert Altman
- 1996 Rosewood, stills, directed by John Singleton
- 1996 Ghost of Mississippi, specials, directed by Rob Reiner
- 1996 Day of the Jackal, stills and specials, directed by Michael Caton-Jones
- 1998 One True Thing, still photographer, directed by Carl Franklin
- 2000 Shaft, still photographer, directed by John Singleton
- 2001 Baby Boy, still photographer, directed by John Singleton
- 2001 A Beautiful Mind, still photographer, directed by Ron Howard
- 2002 8 Mile, still photographer, directed by Curtis Hanson
- 2002 Two Weeks Notice, still photographer, directed by Marc Lawrence
- 2003 2 Fast 2 Furious, still photographer, directed by John Singleton
- 2005 Stay, still photographer, directed by Marc Forster
- 2014 One Hundred Years of Freedom, video and still photographer, directed by Daniel Ostroff
- 2017 Natasha, still photographer, directed by David Bezmozgis
