= Beuford Smith =

American photographer (1936–2025)

- Born: April 12, 1936; Cincinnati, Ohio
- Died: June 7, 2025 (aged 89); Brooklyn
- Known for: photography

Beuford Smith (1936–2025) was an American photographer.

Smith was born in Cincinnati, Ohio. Sources differ on his birth year. the African American Registry and the New York Times list his birthday as April 12, 1936. Several sources list his birth year as 1941.

Smith was a member of the Kamoinge Workshop. He was also a founding editor of the Black Photographers Annual.

In 2020 his work was included in the traveling exhibition Working Together: The Photographers of the Kamoinge Workshop. His work was included in the 2025 exhibition Photography and the Black Arts Movement, 1955–1985 at the National Gallery of Art. In 2026 the Keith de Lellis Gallery held a retrospective entitled Beuford Smith : A Retrospective of Community, Witness, and History.

Smith's photographs are in the collections of the J. Paul Getty Museum, the Museum of Modern Art,the National Gallery of Art, and the Whitney Museum of American Art.
