= Louis H. Draper =

American photographer (1935–2002)

- Louis H. Draper in the 1970s
- Born: Louis Hansel Draper; September 24, 1935; Richmond, Virginia, U.S.
- Died: February 18, 2002 (aged 66); Trenton, New Jersey, U.S.
- Education: Virginia State College; New School for Social Research

Louis Hansel Draper (September 24, 1935 – February 18, 2002) was a New York-based American photographer known for his images of Harlem in the 1960s and was founding member of the Kamoinge Workshop. His work was featured in several volumes of the publication, The Black Photographers Annual. In addition to his images of everyday people in urban settings, Draper photographed significant artists, intellectuals, and civil rights leaders like Fannie Lou Hamer, John Coltrane, Malcolm X, Miles Davis, and Langston Hughes. Draper's work is in the collection of the Museum of Modern Art, The Schomberg Center for Research in Black Culture, the Virginia Museum of Fine Arts, among many other museums, public and private collections.

== Early life and education ==
Louis Hansel Draper was born in Richmond, Virginia, on September 24, 1935. He and his sister Nell attended a private Catholic school near Richmond, the Van deVyver Institute and Virginia Randolph High School in Glen Allen, VA, which was the first high school for African Americans established in Henrico County. In 1953, he enrolled in Virginia State College (now University) in Petersburg, VA where he became a history major. While he was an undergraduate student, Draper's father, who was an amateur photographer, gave him his first camera. After seeing the exhibition catalog for the 1955 show The Family of Man, Draper decided to become an art photographer. In 1957, he left school without finishing his final semester to move to New York. In New York, Draper studied with Harold Feinstein and W. Eugene Smith. Draper lived in the New York area for almost thirty years.

== Career ==
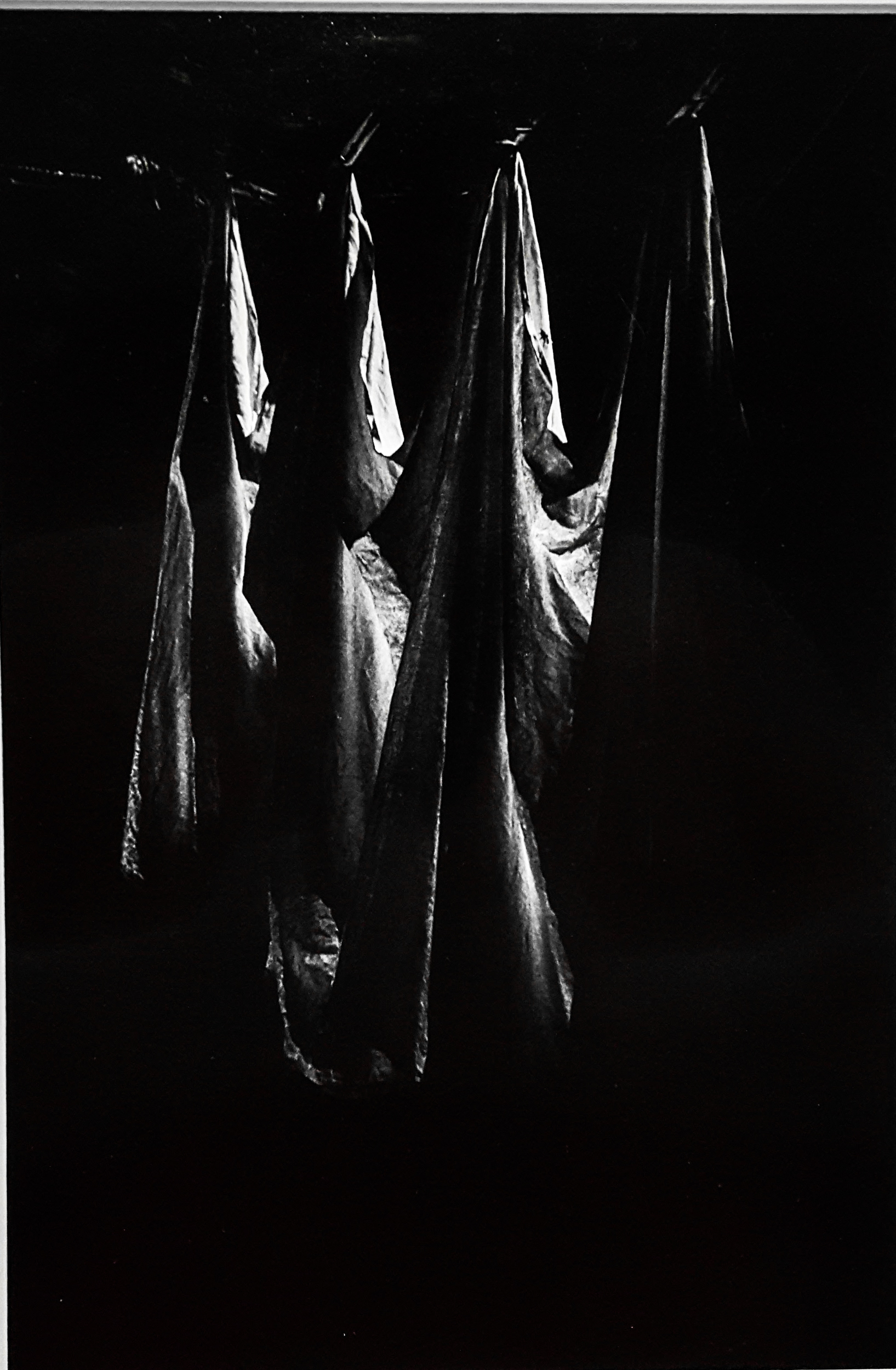
Louis H. Draper, Congressional Gathering, c. 1959, gelatin silver print.

In 1959, Draper created one of his most famous images, Congressional Gathering, a black and white photograph that depicts hanging drapery arranged to resemble Ku Klux Klan hoods. This photograph has been interpreted as referencing the violence committed by the KKK during the civil rights movement as well as a specific reference to the Massive Resistance movement in Virginia.

Draper's work was included in the 2025 exhibition Photography and the Black Arts Movement, 1955–1985 at the National Gallery of Art.

=== Teaching ===
In addition to his mentoring of younger Kamoinge Workshop photographers, Draper taught at Mercer County Community College in New Jersey beginning in 1982.

=== Kamoinge Workshop ===
In 1963, Draper helped to form the Kamoinge Workshop, a group of African American photographers living in New York who wanted a community of like-minded artists that would provide mutual support and mentorship. Many of the younger members of the group identified Draper as a key mentor and educator within Kamoinge. Draper served as the group's president from and kept an extensive archive of the group's exhibition history, meetings, and other materials. In 1972, Draper published a history of Kamoinge in Photo Newsletter.

== Exhibitions ==
- 2020–2022: Working Together: The Photographers of the Kamoinge Workshop

== Collections ==
- Museum of Modern Art
- Virginia Museum of Fine Arts holds a special collection of numerous works by Draper
- Whitney Museum of American Art
