= Albert Fennar =

American photographer (1938–2018)

- Born: April 22, 1938; New York City
- Died: June 3, 2018 (aged 80); Long Beach, California
- Known for: Photography
- Website: alfennarphotography.com

Albert Fennar (1938–2018) was an American photographer.

Fennar was born in New York City on April 22, 1938. He was a member of the photography collective, the Kamoinge Workshop. Fennar died in Long Beach on June 3, 2018.

In 2020 Fennar was one of the photographers featured in the Whitney Museum exhibition Working Together: The Photographers of the Kamoinge Workshop. That exhibit traveled to the J. Paul Getty Museum and the Cincinnati Art Museum in 2022.

His work was included in the 2025 exhibition Photography and the Black Arts Movement, 1955–1985 at the National Gallery of Art.

Fennar's photographs are in the collection of the J. Paul Getty Museum, and the Museum of Modern Art.
