= Adger Cowans =

American photographer and painter

- Born: September 19, 1936 (age 90); Columbus, Ohio
- Education: Ohio University
- Website: adgercowans.com

Adger Cowans is an American fine arts photographer and abstract painter.

== Life and work ==
Cowans was born in Columbus, Ohio, on September 19, 1936. He obtained a Bachelor of Art degree in photography from Ohio University in 1958 and also an alumnus of School of Motion Picture Arts and School of Visual Arts in New York. While serving in the United States Navy, he worked as a photographer before moving to New York, where he later worked at Life magazine with photographer Gordon Parks and fashion photographer Henry Clarke. While in New York, he joined the Kamoinge Workshop, an artists collective dedicated to showing the African Diaspora though photography, soon after it was established in 1963. He moved to Bridgeport, Connecticut after leaving New York.

In 2001, he was awarded the Lorenzo il Magnifico alla Carriera in recognition of his Distinguished Career at Florence Biennale of Contemporary Art and also a recipient of the John Hay Whitney Fellowship and the Martin Luther King Jr Visiting Scholars Award, Wayne State University.

His work has been shown by the Metropolitan Museum of Art, the Museum of Modern Art, the Harvard Fine Art Museum, the International Museum of Photography, and numerous other art institutions. The legendary photographer Gordon Parks, called him one of the most significant artists of our time and noted, “Adger’s individualism sets him apart, simply because he follows his own convictions”. The 2020 Whitney Museum exhibition about the Kamoinge Workshop, Working Together chronicles Cowans' and other founding members' photographs of their communities during the 1960s social changes.

Cowans' work was included in the 2025 exhibition Photography and the Black Arts Movement, 1955–1985 at the National Gallery of Art.
