= Anthony Barboza =

African American artist and writer

- Born: 1944 (age 81–82); New Bedford, Massachusetts
- Known for: Photography

Anthony Barboza (born 1944, New Bedford, Massachusetts) is a photographer, historian, artist and writer. With roots originating from Cape Verde, and work that began in commercial art more than forty years ago, Barboza's artistic talents and successful career helped him to cross over and pursue his passions in the fine arts where he continues to contribute to the American art scene.

Barboza has a prolific and wide range of both traditional and innovative works inspired by African-American thought, which have been exhibited in public and private galleries, and prestigious museums and educational institutions worldwide. He is well known for his photographic work of jazz musicians from the 1970s – '80s. Many of these works are in his book Black Borders, published in 1980 with a grant from the National Endowment for the Arts. In an article printed in 1984 in The City Sun, he said, "When I do a portrait, I'm doing a photograph of how that person feels to me; how I feel about the person, not how they look. I find that in order for the portraits to work, they have to make a mental connection as well as an emotional one. When they do that, I know I have it." Many of his photographs achieve his signature effect through the careful use of lighting and shadows, manipulation of the backdrop, measured adjustments to shutter speeds, composition, and many other techniques and mediums at his command.

Black Dreams/White Sheets, has toured internationally and was shown for the first time in New York City at the Bill Hodges Gallery in November and December 2010. Barboza takes a critical look at the role and experiences of the African diaspora in the historical as well as contemporary context of race, sexuality, gender, politics, and social issues in American society and culture.

== Career ==
Barboza came to New York City directly after graduating high school in 1963 at the age of 19 to study photography with Hugh Bell, a successful Black fashion photographer who became his mentor and allowed Barboza to work for free in exchange for the opportunity to gain experience in the field. Prior to that, he met Adger Cowans, another of the few successful Black commercial photographers of the time, who would introduce Barboza to a group of Black professional photographers who were members of The Kamoinge Workshop. This group was originally directed by Roy De Carava and was created to promote serious dialogues about photography at a time when African-American photographers were still being discriminated against and excluded from mainstream professional photography. They were professionals who joined forces to support and help promote each other's work by offering group commentary and criticism, and by mounting exhibitions together. Barboza carries on this tradition as the current president of what is now known as Kamoinge, Inc. and continues to support other Black professional and aspiring photographers in their work.

In 1965, Barboza was drafted into the Navy and became a full-time photographer for the Jacksonville, Florida-based newspaper The Gosport. It was there that he developed his craft and launched his career in a one-man exhibition at the Pensacola Art Museum and the Emily Lowe Gallery at the University of Miami.

In 1970, his brother Ken Barboza after serving four years in the US Navy started working part-time and eventually became his full-time agent, representing him and helped opened up his world to fashion and beauty magazine and commercial advertising agencies in New York City where he started.

His work was included in the 2024 exhibition The ’70s Lens: Reimagining Documentary Photography and the 2025 exhibition Photography and the Black Arts Movement, 1955–1985 both at the National Gallery of Art.

Also in 2025 the New Bedford Art Museum held a retrospective of Barboza's work entitled I Return With A Feeling Of Us: The Photography of Anthony Barboza.

== Photojournalism/editorial spreads ==
Barboza's work has appeared in photojournalist and editorial spreads for: The New Yorker, Newsweek, Business Week, TV Guide, National Geographic, Town and Country, Village Voice, Vibe, US, Vanity Fair, People, Esquire, GQ, Home, Elle (US, Canadian, French, and Spanish editions), Elle Decour, Vogue, McCalls, Interview, Details, Black Book, Harper's Bazaar, Self, Glamour, Ms., Woman's Day, Cosmopolitan, Playboy, Ebony, Black Enterprise, Geo (Germany), Art News, Washingtonian, Modern Maturity, Mode, Audubon, Redbook, Telegraph Magazine (U.K.), The Sunday Times Magazine (U.K.) Forbes, Fortune, USA Weekend, Dance Magazine, Life Magazine, and The New York Times Sunday Magazine.

== Advertising ==
Other work Barboza has done has been for Coca-Cola, Pepsi, General Motors, Kraft Foods, HBO, Kodak, Revlon, AT&T, the U.S. Army, the U.S. Marines, Sony, Miramax Films, Burger King, Aetna Life Insurance, Arista Records, Nissan, Coors, Absolut Vodka, Reebok, Random House, Hanes, Clairol, Amtrak, Bahamas Tourist Board, Avon, Columbia Records, L'Oreal, and many more.

== Television ==
Barboza was a co-director for a TV commercial featuring his friend and jazz legend Miles Davis for Dentsu Advertising of Japan.

=== Permanent collections ===
- Brooklyn Museum, Brooklyn, NY
- Cornell University Library, Ithaca, NY
- Mott-Warsh Collection, Detroit, MI
- Museum of Modern Art, NYC, NY
- National Portrait Gallery, Smithsonian Institution, Washington, DC
- National Gallery of Art, Washington, DC
- Schomburg Center, New York Public Library, NYC, NY
- Studio Museum of Harlem, NYC, NY
- The Baltimore Museum of Art
- The Museum of Fine Arts, Houston, Houston, TX

== Personal life ==
Anthony Barboza is married to Laura Carrington, a starring actress in the 1984 Lionel Richie video number one hit, "Hello". She is also a groundbreaking daytime soap opera actress who played the role of Simone Ravelle Hardy on the soap opera "General Hospital" from 1987 to 1989. They have been married for more than 25 years and live in Westbury, New York with their three children Danica Barboza, Alexio Barboza and Lien Barboza. He also has two children, Leticia Barboza and Laryssa Gobets from his first marriage to Maria Correa.

== Sources and further reading ==
- Wilmer, Val, Barboza: The Music of Ourselves, Ten.8, No.24, 1986
