= Roy DeCarava =

American photographer (1919–2009)

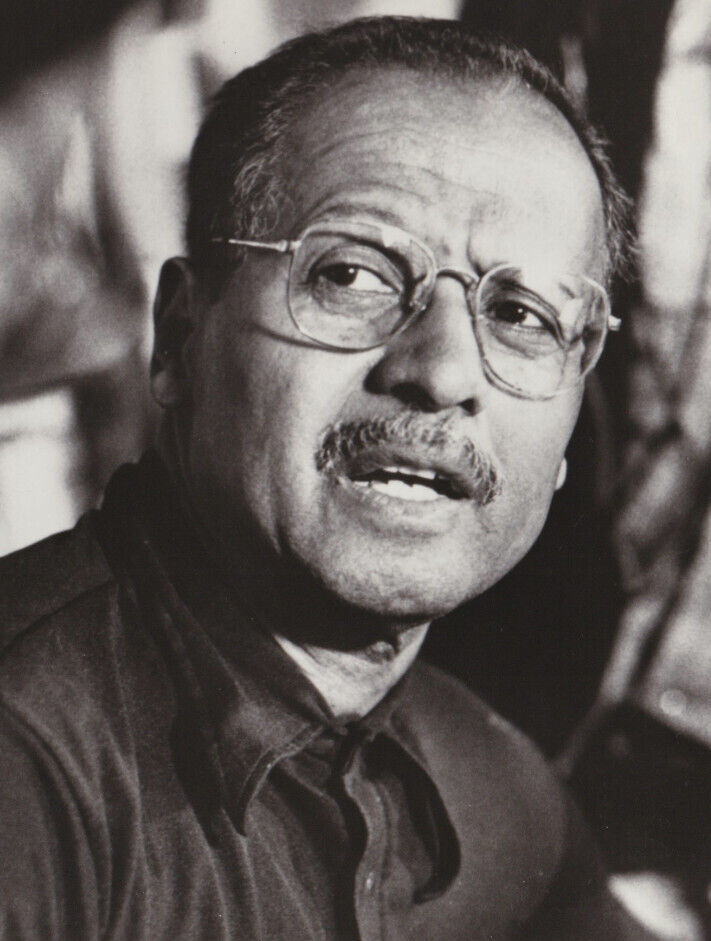
- DeCarava in 1984
- Born: Roy Rudolph DeCarava; December 9, 1919; New York City, U.S.
- Died: October 27, 2009 (aged 89); New York City, U.S.
- Known for: Fine-art photography
- Notable work: The Sound I Saw, The Sweet Flypaper of Life
- Awards: Guggenheim Fellowship; National Medal of Arts

Roy Rudolph DeCarava (December 9, 1919 – October 27, 2009) was an American photographer. DeCarava received early critical acclaim for his fine-art photography, initially engaging and imaging the lives of African Americans and jazz musicians in the communities where he lived and worked. Over a career that spanned nearly six decades, DeCarava came to be known as a founder in the field of black and white fine art photography, advocating for an approach to the medium based on the core value of an individual, subjective creative sensibility, which was separate and distinct from the "social documentary" style of many predecessors.

== Early life and education ==
Roy DeCarava was born in Harlem, Manhattan, New York City on December 9, 1919. DeCarava came of age during the Harlem Renaissance, when artistic activity and achievement among African Americans flourished across the literary, musical, dramatic, and visual arts. After graduating from Textile High School in New York City in 1938, DeCarava independently began working as a visual artist. He continued his formal education at Cooper Union (1938–1940), where he studied painting, architecture, and sculpture. DeCarava expanded upon this early training at the Harlem Art Center (1940–1942) as well as the George Washington Carver Art School, where in addition to painting he began to experiment with printmaking. DeCarava first began to use photography as a means to record and as reference for his paintings, but was so enthralled by the medium that he began devoting all of his time to it and championed black and white silver gelatin photography as an art form of its own. He used his camera to produce striking studies of everyday black life in Harlem, capturing the varied textures of the neighborhood and the creative efflorescence of the Harlem Renaissance. Resisting explicit politicization, DeCarava used photography to counter what he described as “black people...not being portrayed in a serious and artistic way.”

DeCavara was drafted in the Army in 1942, where he would first be sent to Virginia, and then stationed in Fort Claiborne, Louisiana, in the Jim Crow South. There, DeCarava experienced racism so intense that he broke down. In Peter Galassi's biographical essay for the MoMA show, the artist recalled: "The only place that wasn’t segregated in the army was the psychiatric ward of the hospital. I was there for about a month. I was in the army for about six or seven months altogether, but I had nightmares about it for twenty years." DeCarava was married for forty years to art historian Sherry Turner DeCarava. The two collaborated on exhibitions and publications while DeCarava was alive and she continued to promote his work upon his death. According to his obituary, the two met when Turner DeCarava interviewed him for a public program at the Brooklyn Museum.

== Career in fine art photography ==
DeCarava produced five published art books, including The Sound I Saw and The Sweet Flypaper of Life, as well as landmark museum catalogs and retrospective surveys from the Friends of Photography and the Museum of Modern Art in New York. The subject of at least 15 solo art exhibitions, DeCarava was the first African-American photographer to win a Guggenheim Fellowship and as a result of the fellowship, was able to photograph his community and New York City for one year; expressing early creative impressions through the black and white silver gelatin process. His first photo exhibit was in 1950, at the Forty-Fourth Street Gallery in New York City, and he soon found a mentor in Edward Steichen, director of photography at the Museum of Modern Art. Gradually, DeCarava became known for his dedication to the field of visual art and for his own work within it, including many distinctive black and white, silver gelatin photographs of great American musicians. His work also appeared on several record album covers, such as Porgy and Bess, by Miles Davis, Bless this House, by Mahalia Jackson, Flamenco Fire by Carlos Montoya, and Big Bill's Blues, by Big Bill Broonzy. DeCarava received honorary degrees from Rhode Island School of Design, the Maryland Institute of Art, Wesleyan University, The New School for Social Research, The Parsons School of Design and the Art Institute of Boston for contributions to American art.

In 2006, he was awarded the National Medal of Arts from the National Endowment for the Arts, the highest award given to artists by the United States Government.

DeCarava encouraged other fine art photographers and believed in the accessibility of the medium. From 1955 to 1957, at his own expense, he established and supported A Photographer's Gallery in his apartment in a brownstone block at 48 West 85th Street, New York, in which was shown artwork by the great names of American photography of the period. In 1963, he co-founded and became the first director of the Kamoinge Workshop, a Harlem-Based collective that supported the work of black photographers through exhibitions, public programs, group critiques, and published portfolios. He taught for many years at Hunter College, in both its undergraduate and MFA programs.

In 1972 DeCarava received the Benin Creative Photography Award for his contributions to the black community as a creative photographer. Roy DeCarava received the 1996 Cooper Union President's Citation Award and the 2007 and the Cooper Union Alumni Association(CUAA) Augustus Saint Gaudens Award. He was inducted into the Cooper Union Hall of Fame in 2009. DeCarava won a Gold Medal in Photography from the National Arts Club on Gramercy Park April 26, 2001.

DeCarava died in New York City, on October 27, 2009.

== Art historical context and commentary ==
Coming of age in the 1940s, DeCarava appears nothing short of iconoclastic in both his approach to photography, a medium strenuously identified with evidentiary truth, and in his aesthetic ambitions to, as he said, “break through a kind of literalness,” and “express some things I felt.” Maintaining his quest to create a visually autonomous photographic subject of color, DeCarava endured decades of embittering misunderstanding. He has pointed out over and over that despite his “reputation as a documentar[y] photographer, … I really never was,” and reiterated his steadfastly modernist concern to achieve “a creative expression,” rather than a “documentary or sociological statement.” While DeCarava never worked in the field of cinema himself, he grew up in the era of black-and-white filmmaking and, in an interview much later in his career, noted, “I think I absorbed the visual aesthetic of black-and-white films, so that when I started taking pictures, it was natural.”

His largest work is Roy DeCarava: A Retrospective, over 200 black and white photos spanning the late 1940s to the 1990s. Another work is The Sweet Flypaper of Life. Published in 1955, it is a pictorial narrative of family life in Harlem with photographs by DeCarava and text by Langston Hughes. DeCarava wrote ”in spite of poverty, you see people with dignity and a certain quality that contrasts with where they live and what they’re doing.” His Guggenheim fellowship helped fund the project while he spent a full year shooting the photographs for the book. DeCarava's work was included in the 2025 exhibition Photography and the Black Arts Movement, 1955–1985 at the National Gallery of Art.

== Exhibitions ==
- 1950-One man photography show at Fourth Street Photo Gallery (Formerly Forty-Fourth Street Gallery), New York City
- 1951-One man photography show at Countee Cullen Library, New York City
- 1953-"Always the Young Stranger"-Museum of Modern Art, New York City
- 1955-"Family of Man"-Museum of Modern Art, New York City
- 1957-"70 Photographers Look at New York"-Museum of Modern Art, New York City
- 1960-"New Acquisitions"-Museum of Modern Art, New York City
- 1964-"The Photographer's Eye"-Museum of Modern Art, New York City
- 1965-"Edward Steichen Center/Fine Art Photographs"-Museum of Modern Art, New York City
- 1965-"Photography in the Fine Arts #1"-Museum of Modern Art, New York City
- 1969-"Thru Black Eyes"-Studio Museum, Harlem
- 1970-"Roy DeCarava/Photographs"-Sheldon Museum of Art, University of Nebraska
- 1974-"Photography in America"-Whitney Museum of American Art, New York City
- 1976-"The Nation's Capital in Photographs"-The Corcoran Gallery of Art, Washington D.C.

== Collections ==
DeCarava's work is held in the following permanent public collections:

- The Metropolitan Museum of Art, New York
- The Museum of Modern Art, New York
- Art Institute of Chicago
- Sheldon Museum of Art, University of Nebraska, Lincoln
- Addison Gallery of American Art, Andover-Phillips Academy, Massachusetts
- Atlanta University, Georgia
- Joseph E. Seagram & Sons, Inc., New York
- Belafonte Enterprises, Inc., New York
- Detroit Institute of Arts
- Portland Art Museum
- San Francisco Museum of Modern Art
- The Museum of Fine Arts, Houston
- Philadelphia Museum of Art, Pennsylvania
- Museum of Fine Arts, Boston
- Harvard Art Museums, Massachusetts
- Cantor Arts Center, Stanford University, California
- National Gallery of Art, Washington, D.C.

== Works consulted ==
- The Nation's Capital in Photographs, Corcoran Gallery of Art, 1976. By John Gossage. Edition of 3000 copies.
- Roy DeCarava, Photographs. Edited by James Alinder, Friends of Photography, 1981. ISBN 9780933286276.
- Roy DeCarava, A Retrospective. Museum of Modern Art, New York, NY 1996. ISBN 9780870701269.
- The Sound I Saw: Improvisation on a Jazz Theme. Phaidon, 2000. ISBN 9780714841236.
- Ralph Eugene Meatyard. New York: International Center of Photography, 2004. ISBN 9783865210654. Introduction by Cynthia Young.
