= List of black photographers =

This is a list of notable black photographers.

== A ==
- Edmund Abaka
- Felicia Abban
- Fati Abubakar
- Harry Adams
- Dayo Adedayo
- Brenda Agard
- Ajamu X
- Jenevieve Aken
- Lola Akinmade Åkerström
- Jim Alexander
- Salimah Ali
- Khalik Allah
- Devin Allen
- James Latimer Allen
- Jules T. Allen
- Winifred Hall Allen
- Solomon Osagie Alonge
- Kelechi Amadi-Obi
- Esther Anderson
- Bert Andrews
- Philip Kwame Apagya
- Thomas E. Askew
- Aisha Augie-Kuta

== B ==
- James Presley Ball
- Alvin Baltrop
- Ray Barbee
- Anthony Barboza
- James Barnor
- C. M. Battey
- Norman Baynard
- Arthur P. Bedou
- Thony Belizaire
- TY Bello
- Dawoud Bey
- Nydia Blas
- Kwame Brathwaite
- Sheila Pree Bright
- Dudley M. Brooks
- Syd Burke
- Vanley Burke

== C ==
- Dario Calmese
- Dwight Carter
- Don Hogan Charles
- Roland Charles
- Barron Claiborne
- Andrea Clark
- Carl Clark
- Linda Day Clark
- Florestine Perrault Collins
- Darryl Cowherd
- Renee Cox
- Bob Crawford
- Guy Crowder

== D ==
- George Da Costa
- Frank Dandridge
- Roy DeCarava
- Doris Derby
- Andrew Dosunmu
- Louis H. Draper
- Barbara DuMetz

== E ==
- Victor Ehikhamenor
- Edward Elcha
- Darrel Ellis
- Yagazie Emezi
- Isaac Emokpae
- Andrew Esiebo

== F ==
- Rotimi Fani-Kayode
- James C. Farley
- Sharon Farmer
- Albert Fennar
- Mikki Ferrill
- Tam Fiofori
- Lola Flash
- Robert Fletcher
- Rahim Fortune (born 1994)
- Ray Francis
- LaToya Ruby Frazier
- Armet Francis
- Roland Freeman
- Diallo Javonne French
- Howard W. French

== G ==
- Rahima Gambo
- Bill Gaskins
- Wilda Gerideau-Squires
- Robert A. Gilbert
- Leo Antony Gleaton
- Lonnie Graham
- J. A. Green
- Stanley Greene

== H ==
- Austin Hansen
- Elise Forrest Harleston
- Charles Harris
- LeRoy W. Henderson, Jr.
- Paul Henderson
- R.C. Hickman
- Chester Higgins Jr.
- James E. Hinton
- Robert Houston
- Herman Howard
- Letitia Huckaby
- Earlie Hudnall, Jr.

== I ==
- Janna Ireland
- Novo Isioro

== J ==
- Vera Jackson
- Atiba Jefferson
- Ulysses Jenkins
- David Johnson
- Lou Jones

== K ==
- Kamoinge
- Roshini Kempadoo
- Seydou Keïta
- Neil Kenlock
- Hakeem Khaaliq
- Charles Kinkead

== L ==
- Wayne Lawrence
- Deana Lawson
- David Lee
- Quil Lemons
- Roy Lewis
- Jules Lion

== M ==
- Hiram Maristany
- Louise Martin
- John Clark Mayden
- Bruce McNeil
- Robert H. McNeill
- Willie Middlebrook
- Tyler Mitchell
- John W. Mosley
- Jeanne Moutoussamy-Ashe
- Ozier Muhammad
- Aïda Muluneh

== N ==
- Marilyn Nance
- Amarachi Nwosu

== O ==
- David Ogburn
- J. D. 'Okhai Ojeikere
- Emeka Okereke
- Lukman Olaonipekun
- Bayo Omoboriowo
- Ifeoma Onyefulu
- Horace Ové
- Zak Ové
- Mikael Owunna

== P ==
- Gordon Parks
- Charlie Phillips
- Irving Henry Webster Phillips Sr.
- Bob Pixel (Emmanuel Yeboah Bobbie)
- Michael B. Platt
- P. H. Polk

== Q ==
- Terri Quaye

== R ==
- Herbert Randall
- Eli Reed
- Isaiah Rice
- Herb Robinson
- Bayeté Ross Smith
- Radcliffe Roye

== S ==
- Richard Saunders
- Jeffrey Henson Scales
- Addison N. Scurlock
- Mark Sealy
- Taiye Selasi
- Robert A. Sengstacke
- Andres Serrano
- Jamel Shabazz
- John Shearer
- Yinka Shonibare
- Malick Sidibé
- Coreen Simpson
- Lorna Simpson
- Moneta Sleet Jr.
- Clarissa Sligh
- Beuford Smith
- Ming Smith
- Morgan and Marvin Smith
- Frank Stewart
- Chanell Stone
- Maud Sulter
- Isaac Sutton

== T ==
- Bruce Talamon
- Ron Tarver
- Hank Willis Thomas

== U ==
- Uche James-Iroha
- Iké Udé
- August Udoh
- David Uzochukwu

== V ==
- James Van Der Zee
- Raven B. Varona

== W ==
- Shawn Walker
- Augustus Washington
- Lewis Watts
- Carrie Mae Weems
- John H. White
- Pat Ward Williams
- Pep Williams
- Deborah Willis (artist)
- Ernest Withers
- LeRoy Woodson
