= A Movement in Every Direction: Legacies of the Great Migration =

American contemporary art exhibition

- Original 2022 exhibition catalogue, featuring A Song for Travelers (2022) by Robert Pruitt
- Date: April 9–September 11, 2022; October 30, 2022–January 29, 2023
- Venue: Mississippi Museum of Art; Baltimore Museum of Art
- Location: Jackson, Mississippi; Baltimore, Maryland
- Theme: Contemporary art; Great Migration
- Touring dates: March 3–June 25, 2023; August 5, 2023–March 3, 2024; April 13–September 22, 2024
- Touring venues: Brooklyn Museum; California African American Museum; Berkeley Art Museum and Pacific Film Archive
- Touring locations: New York; Los Angeles; Berkeley, California

A Movement in Every Direction: Legacies of the Great Migration is the title of a touring contemporary art exhibition organized jointly by the Mississippi Museum of Art (MMA) and the Baltimore Museum of Art (BMA) in 2022. The exhibition comprises works by 12 African-American artists commissioned by the museums to examine "the profound impact of the Great Migration on the social and cultural life of the United States." Ranging mediums including painting, photography, sculpture, fiber, installation, and video art, the works in the exhibition explore themes of migration, displacement, and community, often through the lens of the artists' own family histories during or after the Great Migration. The exhibition was first shown at the MMA, followed by the BMA, before touring to several other American museums.

== History ==
A Movement in Every Direction was planned around the question, "What would happen if today’s leading artists were given the space to think about the intersections of the Great Migration in a wholistic, expansive, and dynamic way?" The Great Migration was the mass migration of millions of African Americans from the rural American South to urban areas in the North, Midwest, and West, often to escape state-sanctioned racial violence and seek economic opportunity.

The Mississippi Museum of Art (MMA) in Jackson, and the Baltimore Museum of Art (BMA) jointly commissioned the art for the exhibition in 2020, during the COVID-19 pandemic. Artists in the exhibition were asked "to research and reflect on their personal histories and migration narratives through the lens of their contemporary practices." The exhibition was co-curated by Jessica Bell Brown, Curator and Department Head of Contemporary Art at the BMA, and Ryan N. Dennis, Chief Curator at the MMA's Center for Art & Public Exchange.

The show was accompanied by the publication of a two-volume catalogue, published by Yale University Press in association with the MMA and BMA: A Movement in Every Direction: A Great Migration Reader, and A Movement in Every Direction: Legacies of the Great Migration (both 2022). The first volume includes contemporary and historical texts along with archival documents and photographs from and about the Great Migration, while the second is a fully illustrated catalogue of works from the exhibition, accompanied by several commissioned texts.

The exhibition was shown at the MMA from April through September 2022 and at the BMA from October 2022 through January 2023. Following the original showing, the exhibition toured to the Brooklyn Museum, New York, from March through July 2023; and the California African American Museum (CAAM), Los Angeles, in August 2023. The exhibition was open at CAAM for less than two weeks when the museum was forced to close due to extensive storm damage, and the show did not reopen at the museum. The exhibition opened at the Berkeley Art Museum and Pacific Film Archive beginning in April 2024.

== Themes and styles ==
The works in the exhibition vary widely in medium but largely focus on overlapping themes. In particular, works in the exhibition examined issues like land's relationship to identity and community; forced migration and violence; and the connections between family histories and broader cultural and national histories.

Each artist contributed one or more works to the exhibition. The works range widely in style, including minimalist, abstract, and conceptual art, as well as figurative, immersive, and interactive act.

== Participating artists and works ==
The museums commissioned 12 artists to produce work for the exhibition:

- Akea Brionne (b. 1996)
  - An Ode to (You)'all series (2022): School Children (2022), Porch Sittin' (2022), Reflections in the Grass (2022), Rest in Peace (2022), Love's Trio (2022), and How I Hate to Leave (2022), Jacquard tapestry, Poly-fil, rhinestones
- Mark Bradford
  - 500 (2022), Mixed media on panel
- Zoë Charlton
  - Permanent Change of Station (2022), Collage on wood panel, graphite, gouache, and collage on paper
- Larry Cook
  - Let My Testimony Sit Next to Yours series (2022), Mixed media, photographic prints
- Torkwase Dyson
  - Way Over There Inside Me (A Festival of Inches) (2022), Painted steel, glass, painted aluminum, dry-erase marker
- Theaster Gates
  - The Double Wide (2022), Spruce framing, armory flooring, metal roofing, Mississippi reliquary, bronze sculpture, tar, pickled goods, two-channel video (color, sound), 6:18 min. and 2:02 min.
- Allison Janae Hamilton
  - A House Called Florida (2022), Three-channel film installation (color, sound), 34:46 min.
- Leslie Hewitt
  - Untitled (Imperceptible, Slow Drag, Barely Moving) (2022), Hot-rolled steel, red oak, inherited glass objects
- Steffani Jemison
  - A*ray (2022), Single-channel HD video (color, sound), 29:37 min.
- Robert Pruitt
  - A Song for Travelers (2022), Charcoal, conté crayon, and pastel on paper mounted on aluminum
- Jamea Richmond-Edwards (b. 1982)
  - This Water Runs Deep (2022), Mixed media and collage on canvas, with recorded sound, 2:18 min.
- Carrie Mae Weems
  - Leave! Leave Now! (2022), Single-channel digital video (color, sound) installation with mixed media, 25 min.
  - The North Star (2022), Inkjet prints

== Reception ==
Writing in The New York Times after the exhibition's opening in Mississippi, critic Holland Cotter called the show "richly varied" and designated it a critic's pick, praising works by Bradford, Charlton, and Richmond-Edwards, among others. Cotter later included the show on his list in the Times of the best exhibitions of 2022. Journalist Veronica Esposito, writing in The Guardian, praised the exhibition's range and said the show "is important in that it aspires to put agency back into the story of the great migration, as well as engage with the larger story of how Black individuals have found their homes in the US."

Reviewing the show for 4Columns, critic and professor Aruna D'Souza praised the curatorial strategy, saying "It doesn’t offer up Black history as an object to be consumed by hungry visitors but rather as a process of thoughtful creation, over time, in and for community." Writing in Art in America, professor Noah Simblist of Virginia Commonwealth University said the exhibition "brought together artists who act like historians but blur the boundary between the institutional and the personal," and praised Weems' works as "key" to the exhibition's themes.

The exhibition was included on several year-end lists of best art and art exhibitions in 2022, including the ARTnews year-end list and Holland Cotter's year-end list in the Times.
