= Palmerstown, U.S.A. =

- Also known as: Palmerstown
- Genre: Drama
- Created by: Alex Haley
- Developed by: Norman Lear
- Starring: Jonelle Allen; Bill Duke; Star-Shemah Bobatoon; Jermain Hodge Johnson; Beeson Carroll; Janice St. John; Michael J. Fox; Brian Godfrey Wilson; Kenneth White; Iris Korn (1981)
- Composers: Al Schackman (season 1); Jerrold Immel (season 2)
- Country of origin: United States
- Original language: English
- No. of seasons: 2
- No. of episodes: 17

Production
- Executive producers: Norman Lear; Alex Haley; Ronald Rubin
- Running time: 60 minutes
- Production companies: Haley Productions; T.A.T. Communications Company

Original release
- Network: CBS
- Release: March 20, 1980 – June 9, 1981

Palmerstown, U.S.A. (shortened to Palmerstown in March 1981) is a drama television series that aired on CBS from March 20, 1980 to June 9, 1981. It was created by Norman Lear and Alex Haley, whose childhood was the basis for the series. It tells the story of two nine-year-old boys in the rural Southern community of Palmerstown who become best friends during the Great Depression, despite one being black and the other being white.

== Cast ==
- Jonelle Allen as Bessie Freeman
- Bill Duke as Luther Freeman
- Star-Shemah Bobatoon as Diana Freeman
- Jermain Hodge Johnson as Booker T. Freeman
- Beeson Carroll as W.D. Hall
- Janice St. John as Coralee Hall
- Michael J. Fox as Willy-Joe Hall
- Brian Godfrey Wilson as David Hall
- Kenneth White as The Sheriff
- Iris Korn as Widder Brown (1981)

== Episodes ==
=== Season 1 (1980) ===
No. overall	No. in season	Title	Directed by	Written by	Original release date
1	1	"Palmerstown, U.S.A."	Peter Levin	Ronald Rubin	March 20, 1980
2	2	"Palmerstown, U.S.A."	Peter Levin	Ronald Rubin	March 20, 1980
3	3	"The Lesson"	Larry Elikann	Noreen Stone	March 27, 1980
4	4	"A Place for Bo"	Jeffrey Hayden	Robert E. Price	April 3, 1980
5	5	"The Black Travelers: Part 1"	Jeffrey Hayden	Story by : Jim Tisdale; Teleplay by : Ronald Rubin & Alex Haley	April 10, 1980
6	6	"The Black Travelers: Part 2"	Jeffrey Hayden	Story by : Jim Tisdale; Teleplay by : Ronald Rubin & Alex Haley	April 17, 1980
7	7	"Kidnapped"	Gilbert Moses	Alex Haley & Ronald Rubin	April 24, 1980
8	8	"The Old Sister"	Jeffrey Hayden	Story by : Saundra Sharp; Teleplay by : Odie Hawkins, Ronald Rubin, & Alex Haley	May 1, 1980

=== Season 2 (1981) ===
No. overall	No. in season	Title	Directed by	Written by	Original release date
9	1	"Vendetta"	Ivan Dixon	Ernie Wallengren	March 17, 1981
10	2	"Scandal"	Peter Levin	Juliet Packer	March 24, 1981
11	3	"The Hobo"	Kenneth Gilbert	Max Hodge	March 31, 1981
12	4	"Future City"	Ivan Dixon	Ronald Rubin	April 7, 1981
13	5	"Epidemic"	Larry Elikann	Story by : Frank Dandridge; Teleplay by : Frank Dandridge & Michael McGreevey	April 14, 1981
14	6	"The Threat"	Joseph Pevney	Michael McGreevey	April 21, 1981
15	7	"Roadhouse"	Larry Elikann	Bud Freeman	May 5, 1981
16	8	"Dry Hole"	Georg Stanford Brown	Bud Freeman	May 19, 1981
17	9	"The Suitor"	Kenneth Gilbert	Juliet Packer	June 2, 1981
18	10	"Crossroads"	Larry Elikann	Noreen Stone	June 9, 1981

== See also ==
- Any Day Now
