= Dawn D. Bennett-Alexander =

American lawyer (born 1951)

- Born: Dawn D. Bennett; January 2, 1951 (age 75); Washington, D.C.
- Spouses: Willie M. Alexander (m. 1976-1980); Saeid El Manglify (m. 2001-2006)
- Partner(s): Linda F. Harrison (1980-1993), also linda f. harrison
- Parent(s): Ann Pearl Frances (née Liles) Bennett and William H. Bennett
- Awards: Fulbright fellowship (2000–2001)

Academic background
- Education: Defiance College (1968-70).; Federal City College (now the University of the District of Columbia, B.A. 1972); Howard University School of Law (J.D., 1975)

Academic work
- Notable works: Employment Law for Business
- Website: www.practicaldiversity.com

External image
- Dawn D. Bennett-Alexander

Dawn D. Bennett-Alexander (born 1951) is a lawyer, academic, author and consultant who created the first course in employment law addressing workplace discrimination for colleges of business and led in the development of what is now known as Diversity, Equity, Inclusion, and Belonging (DEIB).

In the 1970s, Bennett-Alexander was a law clerk for the District of Columbia Court of Appeals and Federal Trade Commission and was an assistant to the associate director and counsel at the White House Domestic Policy Council. She was an advisor and attorney to the Federal Labor Relations Authority from 1981 to 1982.

Bennett-Alexander taught business law, law studies, and employment law at the Antioch School of Law (now the University of the District of Columbia David A. Clarke School of Law), University of North Florida, and the University of Georgia's Terry College of Business.

Bennett-Alexander was awarded the Fulbright Scholar fellowship and researched and taught at the Ghana School of Law from October 2000 to August 2001. Following the racially motivated murders of George Floyd and others, she taught Diversity and Inclusion in a Post-COVID World: Does it Still Matter.

Working in the employment law field for more than 40 years, she is an expert in legal studies, inclusion, diversity, and sexual harassment. She published works about gender, race, and sexual orientation, particularly as they relate to employment law.

== Early life and education ==
Born January 2, 1951 in Washington, D.C., Dawn D. Bennett is the daughter of Ann Pearl Frances (née Liles) Bennett and William H. Bennett, who served in the military during World War II. After the war and university, William was a clerk at the National Bureau of Standards and Harry Diamond Laboratories. Beginning in 1955, and for 22 years, her father was a pastor at Galilee Baptist Church in Washington D.C. Bennett-Alexander had four siblings, Jean, Gale, Brenda, and William. Bennett-Alexander's mother died in 1971. When William married Pearl Thompson, Bennett-Alexander acquired two stepsisters, Roberta and Rosalyn, and a step brother, Donnell Thompson.

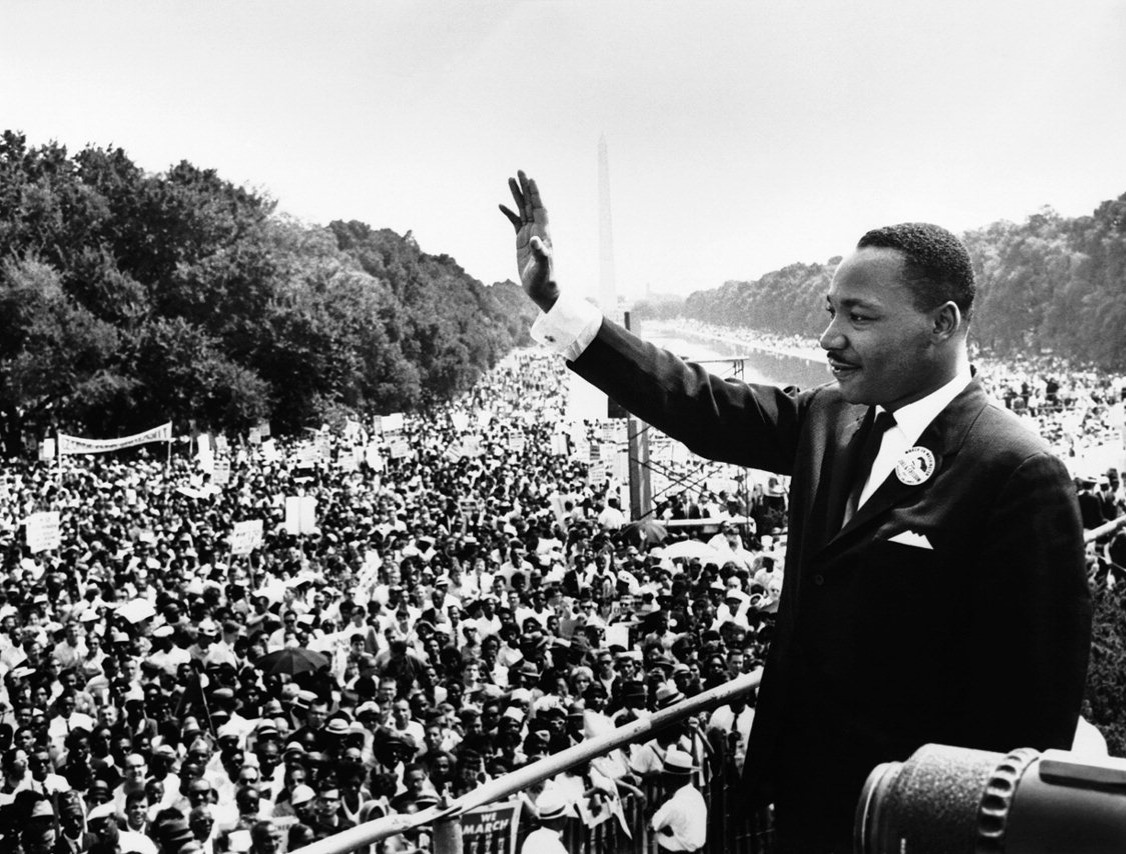
Martin Luther King Jr. addresses a crowd from the steps of the Lincoln Memorial, Washington, D.C.

External audio
- I Have a Dream, Martin Luther King Jr., March on Washington for Jobs and Freedom, August 28, 1963

Bennett-Alexander was 12 when she attended the March on Washington for Jobs and Freedom and heard Martin Luther King Jr.'s "I Have a Dream" speech (August 28, 1963). She said "he took not only the country to a new place as regards to race, but he totally changed the expectations that we have now come to take for granted as to how people should be treated."

Bennett-Alexander attended Defiance College from 1968 to 1970 and she earned her B.A. from Federal City College (now the University of the District of Columbia) in 1972. She earned her J.D. from the Howard University School of Law in 1975.

== Career ==
=== Lawyer, consultant, and educator ===
Bennett-Alexander was a law clerk to Honorable Julia Cooper Mack at the District of Columbia Court of Appeals from 1975 to 1976. Mack was the first African American female appointed under the District of Columbia's new Home Rule Act of 1973 to the highest court in D.C., the District of Columbia Court of Appeals. The Honorable Julia Cooper Mack was the first African American female appointed to a court of last resort in the United States.

From there, Bennett-Alexander was assistant to associate director and counsel at the White House Domestic Policy Council until 1977. She was a law clerk at the Federal Trade Commission from 1977 to 1978. Bennett-Alexander taught at the Antioch School of Law (now the University of the District of Columbia David A. Clarke School of Law) from 1979 to 1980. After that, she was an advisor and attorney at the Federal Labor Relations Authority from 1981 to 1982, when she was hired at the University of North Florida as an associate professor of business and employment law. In 1984, she received a fellowship from the McKnight Foundation, Florida Endowment Fund, and McKnight Jr. Faculty Award.

Bennett-Alexander taught employment law at colleges of business based on Title VII of the Civil Rights Act of 1964. At the University of Georgia's Terry College of Business since 1988, she was the school's first African American female professor and the only tenure-track African American female professor. Even though there have been improvements since the civil rights era, there has not been a lot of integration of races at social events. Bennett-Alexander has encouraged her students to go to events that might make them uncomfortable, like a white student going to "step shows" at black fraternities and sororities.

Bennett-Alexander was awarded the Fulbright Scholar fellowship and researched and taught at the Ghana School of Law from October 2000 to August 2001. Her project was "Race and Gender as Factors in Employment in a 'Homogeneous' Society".

She presented "Practical diversity: taking inclusion from theory to practice" in a TEDx talk panel discussion on March 27, 2015. Bennett-Alexander consulted with organizations and companies about equity and inclusion after the racially motivated killings of Breonna Taylor, Ahmaud Arbery, and George Floyd. The purpose of her work was to identify ways in which the organizations may have fallen short in the past and what they can do now to be more equitable and inclusive. Stunned by emotional toll that the deaths have had on blacks, and Americans as a whole, Bennett-Alexander presented a course at Osher Lifelong Learning Institute (OLLI) of University of Georgia entitled Diversity and Inclusion in a Post-COVID World: Does it Still Matter. She entered the field of teaching to model being kind, nonjudgmental, and to live according to one's principles and beliefs. Bennett-Alexander has applied these intentions to her work with her consulting firm Practical Diversity. In the OLLI course, she seeks to build a common understanding about racial relations with assigned reading and open-minded discussions, and to understand the tolls that systemic policies and laws play in perpetuating dissension.

Bennett-Alexander noted that the Clinton–Lewinsky scandal brought unprecedented levels of detail to the discussion of sexual scandals and harassment, so that some people feel freer to share their own experiences. Bennett-Alexander retired from University of Georgia in 2020. Bennett-Alexander taught the Anti-Racist Courtroom course at the National Judicial College and became a member of its faculty.

=== Writer ===
Bennett-Alexander met Laura Hartman at an Academy of Legal Studies in Business conference in the 1990s and they co-authored college text books, beginning with Employment Law for Business, the first Employment Law textbook for colleges of business. Linda P. Hartman, has been the associate vice-president for academic affairs at DePaul University. Other important publications written by Bennett-Alexander are: "Sexual Harassment in the Office", in Personnel Administrator in 1988; "The State of Affirmative Action in Employment: A Post Stotts Retrospective" in the American Business Law Journal in 1990, "Hostile Environment Sexual Harassment: A Clearer View" in the Labor Law Journal in 1991; and The Legal, Ethical & Regulatory Environment of Business, published in 1996.

Bennett-Alexander, author of "Reflections on being an out African American lesbian on a Southern campus" in Lesbians in academia (1997), has published about affinity orientation, including her experiences as an out faculty member. In 2011, Bennett-Alexander co-authored The Legal, Ethical and Regulatory Environment of Business in a Diverse Society. Bennett-Alexander wrote My Hair Is Not Like Yours: Workplace Hair Grooming Policies for African American Women as Racial Stereotyping in Violation of Title VII in 2016 with Linda F. Harrison.

External image
- The Boss, photograph by P. H. Polk, taken during the Harlem Renaissance, 1932, Corcoran Collection

Bennett-Alexander and her three daughters contributed to the book Children of the Dream : our own stories of growing up Black in America. Her daughters are Jennifer Dawn Bennett-Alexander, Anne Alexis Bennett-Alexander, and Tess Alexander Bennett-Harrison. Bennett-Alexander, who is driven by the men and women who walked and struggled before her, researched her family's history to share with her daughters. She learned the strength of her enslaved great-grandmother who bore a lifetime scar on her face that she received fighting off a sexual attack by the landowner. Bennett-Alexander states that her ancestors created the opportunities that led to her success today. She has been inspired by the photograph of The Boss, taken by Prentice (P. H.) Polk. Dressed in clothing of enslaved women, the woman in the photograph "has more dignity and more common sense than many people whose wealth or academic degrees indicate in their stature".

=== Foster tolerance and acceptance ===
To teach her students the "reality besides their own", Bennett-Alexander has studied the Holocaust and the ways in which Americans have treated African Americans during the years of slavery and Native Americans during the forced displacement conducted with the Trail of Tears.

In 2016, Bennett-Alexander and Cas Mudde, also a professor at the University of Georgia, spoke at the viewing of Hate: A Film by Israeli Nadav Eyal at the school. About Islamophobia in northern Europe, the hatred against Muslims is also intertwined with anti-Semitism. Mudde has an interest in extremism and Bennett-Alexander teaches her students how to "operationalize diversity."

=== Membership ===
Bennett-Alexander was the president of the Southeastern Academy of Legal Studies in Business from 1992 to 1993. She was a co-chair of the Employment Law Section of the organization from 1992 to 1994. Bennett-Alexander has been a member of National Council of Negro Women and National Organization for Women since the 1980s, and also joined legal, political action, and theater organizations. She served as a board member for the Girls Clubs of Jacksonville, Inc., Consumer Credit Counseling Services of Northeast Florida, and the Friends of Athens Creative Theater.

=== Awards and scholarship ===
Bennett-Alexander received the National Elizabeth Hurlock Beckman Excellence in Teaching Award and President's Martin Luther King Jr. Fulfilling the Dream Award while she was at the University of Georgia. She has received other awards for research and teaching excellence and multi-party dispute resolution.

An annual award was created in her name, the Dawn D. Bennett-Alexander Inclusive Community Award, for faculty members at the University of Georgia. She founded the Dawn D. Bennett-Alexander Building Bridges Scholarship for qualified students who pursue diversity and inclusiveness in their studies. She started the scholarship fund with the $25,000 award that she received when received the National Elizabeth Hurlock Beckman Excellence in Teaching Award.

== Publications ==
=== Legal books ===
- Employment Law for Business (10th ed.). McGraw-Hill Publishing Company. 2022 [1995]. ISBN 978-1-260-73427-0.
- The Legal, Ethical & Regulatory Environment of Business. South-Western Publishing Company. 1996. ISBN 978-0-538-83728-6.
- The Legal, Ethical and Regulatory Environment of Business in a Diverse Society. McGraw-Hill Publishing. 2011. ISBN 978-0-07-352492-4.

=== Non-fiction book chapters and articles ===
- Life Notes: Contemporary Writings of Black Women. Norton Press. 1995. ISBN 978-0-393-31206-5. (two chapters)
- Lesbians in Academia. Routledge Press. 1997. ISBN 978-0-415-91701-8. (personal narrative)
- "Sexual Harassment entry". Academic Americana Encyclopedia 1998. Grolier Enterprises. 1999. ISBN 978-0-7172-0321-5.
- "(R)evolution of Black and White". Children of the Dream: Growing Up Black in America. Pocket Books/Simon Schuster. 1999. ISBN 978-0-671-00803-1.
- Laura Pincus Hartman, ed. (February 2004). "Affirmative Action". Perspectives in Business Ethics. McGraw-Hill. ISBN 978-0-07-288146-2.
- Encyclopedia of Business Ethics and Society (2nd ed.). SAGE Publications. 2018 [2007]. ISBN 978-1-4833-8152-7. Five entries: Employment Discrimination, Equal Opportunity, National Origin Discrimination, Comparable Worth, and Race Discrimination.
- My Hair Is Not Like Yours: Workplace Hair Grooming Policies for African American Women as Racial Stereotyping in Violation of Title VII, 22 Cardozo J.L. & Gender 437, 2015–2016, with linda f. harrison

=== Fictional books ===
The Quilt Journeys Mystery Series with Renée T. H. Patterson

- The Wandering Quilt (Book 1). IUniverse. 2022. ISBN 978-1-6632-4397-3.
- Hidden in Plain Sight: Brian's Quilt (Book 2). Quilted Hearts. 2023. ISBN 979-8-3974-4428-6.
- Not All Diamonds are Gems, Not All Stars Are in the Sky: Eden's Quilt (Book 3). Quilted Hearts. 2023. ISBN 979-8-3974-5280-9.
