= Tonika Lewis Johnson =

American photographer and activist

Tonika Johnson
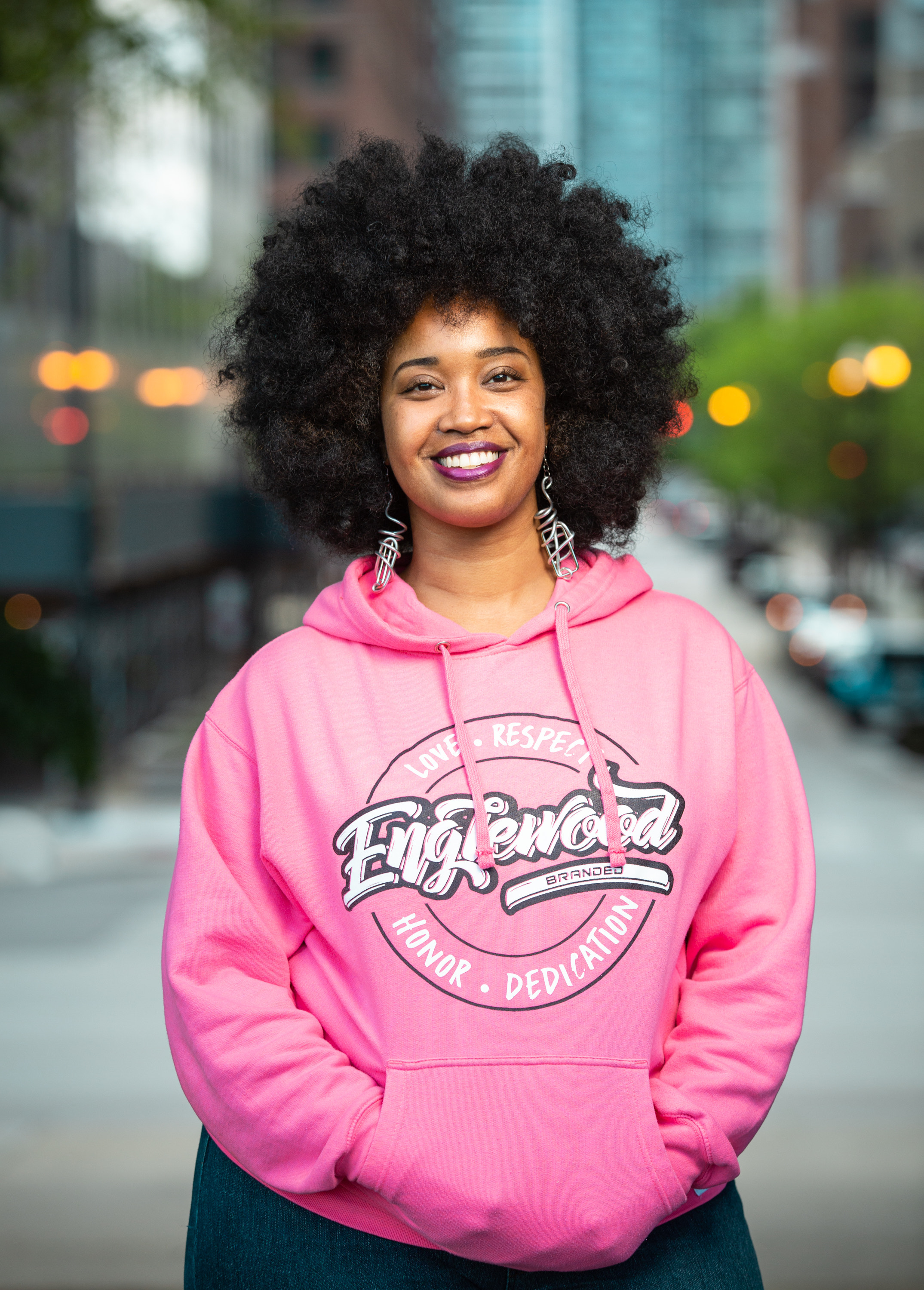
- Born: Tonika Lewis Johnson; Chicago, Illinois, U.S.
- Education: Columbia College Chicago (BA, 2003); National Louis University (MBA, 2005)
- Occupations: Photographer; Social justice artist; Community activist
- Known for: Folded Map Project; Inequity For Sale; Englewood Rising; UnBlocked Englewood; Belonging
- Style: Photography
- Awards: MacArthur Fellow (2025); Gordon Parks Foundation Fellow (2024)
- Website: www.tonikajohnson.com

Tonika Lewis Johnson is an American photographer, social practice artist, and community organizer based in the Englewood neighborhood on Chicago’s South Side. Her work focuses on the historical and contemporary effects of racial segregation, housing discrimination, and disinvestment in Black communities, using photography, mapping, public art, and participatory projects.

Johnson is best known for The Folded Map Project, a multi-year initiative that examines residential segregation in Chicago by documenting properties with identical street addresses located in racially and socioeconomically different neighborhoods on the city’s North and South sides. Johnson has developed related projects including Inequity For Sale, UnBlocked Englewood, and Belonging. She is a co-founder of the Englewood Arts Collective and the Resident Association of Greater Englewood.

Johnson has received national recognition for her work, including being named a Chicago Magazine Chicagoan of the Year in 2017, an Architect Magazine Gamechanger in 2021, and a MacArthur Fellowship in 2025.

== Early life and education ==
Johnson was raised as an only child in an artistic household; her mother was a writer, her father practiced photography, and several members of her extended family were visual artists. She grew up in the Englewood neighborhood on Chicago’s South Side, where her maternal grandmother had lived since the 1960s. She lived in Englewood until the age of seven, when her mother moved the family to the Uptown neighborhood on Chicago’s North Side; they later returned to Englewood when Johnson was eleven.

Throughout her childhood, she attended schools on the city’s North Side, including Lane Technical High School, a selective-enrollment public school. Her daily commute between Englewood and the North Side contributed to her awareness of racial and economic inequalities across Chicago neighborhoods. While in high school, Johnson began pursuing photography and participated in Young Chicago Authors. She went on to earn a Bachelor of Arts in journalism from Columbia College Chicago in 2003. She later completed an MBA at National Louis University in 2005.

== Career ==
After graduating from college, Johnson worked as a grant writer for nonprofit and social service organizations. During this period, she continued photographing her surroundings independently, initially viewing photography as a personal practice rather than a professional art career.

In 2010, Johnson co-founded the Resident Association of Greater Englewood, a resident-led organization focused on neighborhood advocacy and leadership. Alongside her artistic practice, she worked extensively as a teaching artist from 2011 to 2015, leading photography and media programs in Chicago Public Schools and community-based settings, including partnerships with Changing Worlds.

Johnson’s photographic work gained broader recognition after it was described as art by viewers online. In 2016, she received a grant from the Chicago Department of Cultural Affairs and Special Events, which she used to produce large-scale photographic prints exhibited at the first Englewood Art Fair, marking her entry into public exhibition.

In 2017, Johnson co-founded the Englewood Arts Collective, an artist-led initiative supporting cultural production and creative placemaking in Greater Englewood and beyond. Her work increasingly combined photography with public engagement and public presentation. In 2019, she was appointed to the Cultural Advisory Council for the City of Chicago.

== Major works ==
The Folded Map Project

First exhibited in 2018, The Folded Map Project is a multi-media project examining Chicago’s residential segregation using the city’s street grid. Johnson photographs properties with the same street address located miles apart in racially and socioeconomically different neighborhoods on Chicago’s North and South sides and brings the property owners—whom she refers to as “map twins”—together for recorded conversations reflecting on their lived experiences.

The project includes documentary photography, facilitated meetings, recorded conversations, a short film, and an educational curriculum. In 2020, The Folded Map Project was organized as a nonprofit organization, with Johnson as chief executive officer.

Inequity For Sale

In 2021, Johnson developed Inequity For Sale, a public art and research project documenting the effects of mid-20th-century discriminatory land sale contracts imposed on Black homebuyers in Greater Englewood. The project installed life-size markers on South Side homes to share the history of contract selling and expanded to include documentary photography, oral histories, interviews with residents and descendants, and a podcast.

UnBlocked Englewood

Johnson launched UnBlocked Englewood in 2023 in partnership with the Chicago Bungalow Association. The initiative focuses on a single residential block in Englewood and seeks to “[reimagine] home improvement and neighborhood revitalization as public art.”

Initially centered on 22 homes, the project had repaired more than half of the participating properties by 2025, supported in part by a grant from the City of Chicago.

Belonging (Chicago)

Belonging (Chicago) is a photographic and audio project examining how race, class, and place shape young people’s experiences of inclusion and exclusion in urban environments. The project features portraits and recorded interviews with Black and Latinx youth reflecting on experiences of misperception, surveillance, and belonging within the city.

Belonging: France

Johnson expanded this inquiry internationally through Belonging: France, a continuation of the project documenting experiences of belonging and exclusion in Paris and its surrounding suburbs, including Clichy-sous-Bois. The project situates Chicago’s patterns of segregation within a broader global context.

Don’t Go

Johnson is the co-author, with sociologist Maria Krysan, of Don’t Go: Stories of Segregation and How to Disrupt It (2025), which examines residential segregation in Chicago through narratives addressing long-standing warnings to avoid the city’s South and West Side neighborhoods.

Other work

Johnson’s photography was the centerpiece of Englewood Rising, a resident-led billboard campaign conceived with community activists and funded by Englewood residents. The campaign used large-scale public imagery to counter narratives of poverty and crime by highlighting the neighborhood’s cultural and visual landscape.

== Awards and recognition ==
- 2025: MacArthur Genius Fellow
- 2025: Visiting Pritzker Fellow, University of Chicago
- 2025: Social Justice Impact Hero, American Red Cross
- 2024: Fellow, Gordon Parks Foundation
- 2023: Community Impact Award, Metropolitan Planning Council
- 2022: Influencer, Landmarks Illinois
- 2022: City of Chicago's Together We Heal Creative Placemaking Grant
- 2021: Gamechanger, Architect Magazine
- 2021: Artist-As-Instigator Residency, National Public Housing Museum
- 2020: Corlis Benefideo Award, North American Cartographic Information Society
- 2020: Planning Advocate Award, American Planning Association
- 2019: Leaders for a New Chicago Award, Field Foundation
- 2017: Chicagoan of the Year, Chicago Magazine

== Selected exhibitions ==
- The Long Dream, Museum of Contemporary Art, Chicago (Fall 2020)
- Envisioning Justice Exhibition, Sullivan Galleries at the School of the Art Institute of Chicago (Summer 2019)
- Folded Map, Loyola University Museum of Art (Summer 2018)
- Everyday Englewood, Loyola University Museum of Art (Spring 2018)
- From the INside, Harold Washington Library (April - June 2017)
- Chicago: Places, People & Possibilities, Chicago Cultural Center (Feb - April 2017)

== Works ==
- Johnson, Tonika Lewis; Krysan, Maria (November 19, 2024). Don't Go. Cambridge Hoboken (N.J.): Polity. ISBN 978-1-5095-6444-6.

== Personal life ==
Johnson lives in Englewood, Chicago. She has two children.
