= Gordon Parks Foundation =

American foundation

The Gordon Parks Foundation is an American foundation dedicated to the legacy and work of photographer Gordon Parks which is headquartered in Pleasantville, New York. In addition to preserving Parks' work, it also runs several initiatives dedicated to the preservation and advancement of art, such as its annual Foundation Dinner, its Legacy Initiative, and its annual fellowships. As of 2025, the foundation is directed by Peter W. Kunhardt Jr.

== Namesake ==
Parks was an African American photographer most known for his work in capturing "civil-rights issues and race relations in the 1950s and '60s," among other parts of Black life in the twentieth century. He was the first Black photographer to work for magazines like Vogue and Life, as well as the first Black filmmaker to direct a Hollywood feature film.

In 2006, prior to his death, Parks established the foundation with Philip B. Kunhardt, his longtime friend and colleague, as well as current director Peter w. Kunhardt's grandfather. Parks tasked it to "Take what I've built and push it forward. Take what I’ve started and carry it into the future." Both Parks and Kunhardt passed away within two weeks of each other that year.

== Initiatives ==
=== Foundation Dinner and Award ===
Ever since 2007, a year after Parks' death, the foundation has annually hosted the Gordon Parks Foundation Awards Dinner in New York City. In addition to bringing together members of the art community, as well as remembering the legacy of Parks, it also serves as an auction and fundraiser event. It also provides the Gordon Parks Foundation Award to those who exemplify the foundation's mission of diversity and justice, among other values.

Every year, high-profile community members attend, facilitate, and receive honors at the dinner. In 2025, honorees included Bethann Hardison, Rashid Johnson, Anna Wintour, and Andrew Young. Andra Day and Dave Guy of The Roots delivered performances, while Colman Domingo, Hank Willis Thomas, Aurora James, Tyson Beckford, and Jeanne Moutoussamy-Ashe served as presenters. The event was co-chaired by Alicia Keys and Swizz Beatz, as well as Spike Lee and Tonya Lewis Lee.

=== Legacy Initiative ===
In January 2025, the foundation announced the Legacy Initiative, also known as the Gordon Parks Foundation Legacy Fund, which is a fund dedicated to annually identifying and purchasing works from "mid- and late-career artists whose practices are reflective of Parks's own life and legacy." Purchased works become part of the foundation's collection for research and exhibition purposes; Mikki Ferrill and LeRoy Henderson, two photographers once close with Parks, were the first artists to have their work acquired.

=== Art fellowships ===
Since 2017, the foundation has annually selected artists, writers, and/or activists to receive art fellowships, specifically those in line with Parks' creative and justice-oriented values. All fellows are given honors at the annual Gordon Parks Foundation Dinner.

In 2024, Larry Cook and Tonika Lewis Johnson received fellowships. D. Watkins received a Genevieve Young Fellowship in Writing, a specific fellowship honoring book editor and Parks' former wife Genevieve Young.

In 2025, Derek Fordjour, Scheherazade Tillet, and Salamishah Tillet received awards of $25,000 toward "new and ongoing projects centered around representation and social justice." Fordjour and Scheherazade Tillet were provided solo shows at the foundation's gallery, while also having their work acquired by its collection.

=== Gordon Parks Foundation–Steidl Book Prize ===
Since the foundation's release of its centennial book in 2012, the Gordon Parks Foundation has partnered with Gerhard Steidl to annually publish "an exhibition catalog in collaboration with a museum" to support artists and their photographic projects. LaToya Ruby Frazier, Jamel Shabazz, Devin Allen, and Moutoussamy are among the prize's past recipients.

=== Exhibits ===
At the foundation's headquarters in Pleasantville, a gallery frequently shows limited-time exhibitions related to Parks' work. In early 2025, an exhibit dedicated to the photography of Ralph Ellison, author of Invisible Man and close friend of Parks, was displayed.

As the archive of Parks' photographs, the foundation also frequently collaborates with art venues to showcase works by the photographer. In 2024, a Parks exhibit opened at the Syracuse University Art Museum. In 2025, the foundation partnered with the Bowdoin College Museum of Art to exhibit 65 photographs from early on in Parks' career prior to joining Life in 1948. An exhibition with Howard University was scheduled for later that year.
