= Robert Fletcher =

Robert Fletcher may refer to:

- Robert Fletcher (writer), 16th-century English verse writer
- Robert Fletcher (East India Company officer) (c. 1738–1776)
- Robert Fletcher (North Carolina politician) (1815–1885), American politician
- Robert Fletcher (priest) (1850–1917), archdeacon of Blackburn
- Robert Fletcher (New Zealand politician) (1863–1918), New Zealand politician of the Liberal Party
- Robert Virgil Fletcher (1869–1960), justice of the Supreme Court of Mississippi
- Horace Fletcher (footballer) or Robert Fletcher (1876–1931), English football forward
- Robert Fletcher (poet) (1885–1972), uncredited lyricist to Cole Porter's "Don't Fence Me In"
- Robert Fletcher (costume designer) (1922–2021), costume and set designer
- Bob Emmett Fletcher (1911–2013), farmer who helped interned Japanese during WWII
- Robert H. Fletcher (1900–1968), American football player and coach
- Robert L. Fletcher (1920–2020), Arizona farmer and businessman who helped develop the Phoenix area
- Robert Fletcher (photographer) (born 1938), American photographer, filmmaker, writer, and educator
