= Leslie Hewitt =

American artist (born 1977)

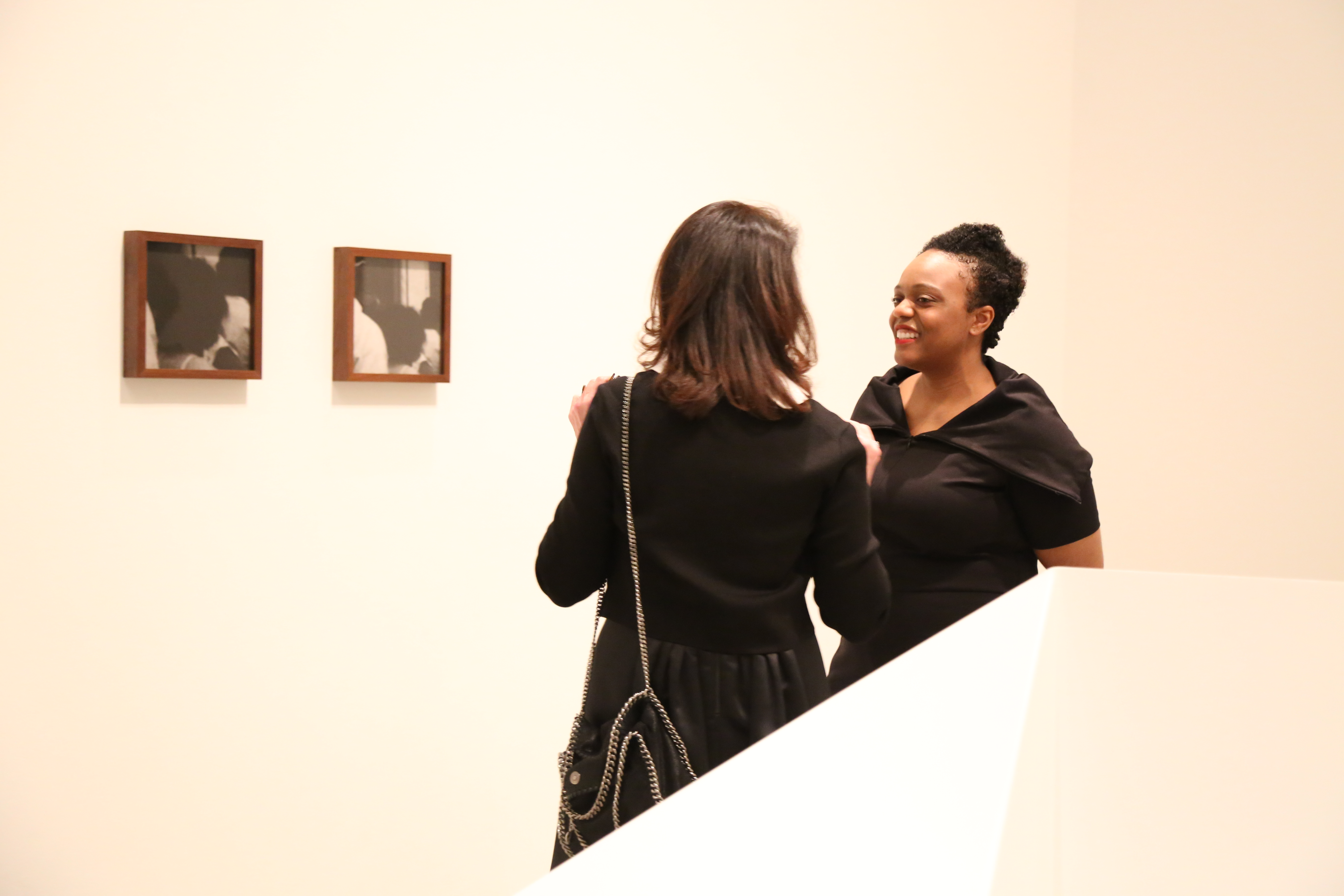
- Leslie Hewitt Exhibition at Power Plant
- Born: 1977 (age 48–49); Saint Albans, New York, United States
- Education: The Cooper Union For the Advancement of Science and Art (B.F.A.); Yale University (M.F.A.); New York University, Africana Studies/Cultural Studies
- Website: lesliehewitt.info

Leslie Hewitt (born 1977, Saint Albans, Queens) is an American contemporary visual artist.

== Education ==
Leslie Hewitt was born in 1977 in Saint Albans, Queens, in New York City. Hewitt received a B.F.A. from the Cooper Union's School of Art in 2000 and later received an M.F.A. from Yale University in 2004. She studied Africana Studies and Cultural Studies at New York University from 2001 to 2003. Hewitt has held residencies at the Core Program at The Museum of Fine Arts, Houston, The Studio Museum in Harlem, and Skowhegan School of Painting and Sculpture.

== Personal life ==
"Hewitt has been described as a member of the post–civil rights generation, which understands the civil rights movement through images and text rather than direct experience. More specifically, she is of a generation growing up just outside the immediate shadow of pressing political change, and one which also has a particular relationship to photography."

== Career ==
Hewitt explores political, social, and personal narratives through photography, sculpture, and site-specific installations. Her work varies in scale from small compositions to billboard-sized photographs which rest in wooden frames that lean against the wall and invite viewers to experience a space that rests between sculpture and traditional photography. She references notions of non-linear perspective and double consciousness through arrangements of objects from popular culture and personal ephemera. She is interested in how much we rely on images to provide memories of personal experience, how collective memory of past events is shaped and preserved, and in how the two overlap, coexist, and inform each other. Hewitt draws much of her material from black popular culture of the 1970s and ’80s. Items such as VHS tapes of black cinema, graffitied documents, and books by Alex Haley and Eldridge Cleaver often appear in her photographs or reside within her installations.

Hewitt has an extensive residency and exhibition history. In 2007, she spent a significant amount of time in Houston participating in the Core Program and served as the Project Row Houses/ Core Fellow from 2006 to 2007. Hewitt participated in the 2008 Whitney Biennial with her piece Make it Plain and received a 2008 Art Matters research grant to travel to the Netherlands to research Dutch still-life paintings created during the period of the Trans-Atlantic slave trade at the Rijksmuseum in Holland. From 2009 to 2010, Hewitt was the Mildred Londa Weisman fellow as part of the Radcliffe Institute Fellowship at Harvard University. During her fellowship Hewitt examined the origins of the camera obscura and used the camera as a tool to explore cultural memory through the construction of temporary still lifes. By repeatedly composing and photographing her arrangements she captured changes in daylight, gravity, and perception.

She was the recipient of the Guna S. Mundheim Berlin Prize in the Visual Arts and Fellow at the American Academy in Berlin for Spring 2012. In the fall of 2012 a solo exhibition of her work, Leslie Hewitt: Sudden Glare of the Sun, was presented at the Contemporary Art Museum St. Louis. Hewitt was the 2014 USA Artists Francie Bishop Good and David Horvitz Fellow in Visual Arts. Her work is in the public collection at the Museum of Modern Art, New York, NY; Guggenheim Museum, New York, NY; Los Angeles County Museum of Art, Los Angeles, CA; The Studio Museum in Harlem, New York, NY, among others. In 2016, her work was included in Photo-Poetics: An Anthology at the Guggenheim Museum, New York, NY. Leslie Hewitt: Collective Stance, a solo exhibition with collaborative works made with cinematographer Bradford Young, was presented at Sculpture Center in Queens, NY, in 2016.

Hewitt is represented by contemporary art gallery Perrotin.

== Work ==
=== Riffs on Real Time (2006–2009) ===
Hewitt's exhibition featured a collection of 10 highly stylized photographs from an ongoing series started in 2002. Shown together for the first time by the same name in a sleek installation, Untitled, 2011. Described as "postmodern takes on the still life", Riffs on Real Time is an exploration of how the juxtaposition of different materials can comprise a cultural identity. Created from 2002 to 2009, a primary image, usually culled from the American media and sociopolitical in bent, is centrally placed on a larger book, photo, or other document so that the image appears framed; in turn, this arrangement is photographed laid out on a hardwood or carpeted floor, which adds yet another frame. "Hewitt operates within an unvarying compositional structure. Each image includes a document showing clear evidence of use—perhaps a book with worn corners, a magazine folded open to a particular page, or a sheet of paper with inscrutable writing. On top of this document a snapshot of American life is placed. These layered constructions are arranged and photographed directly on the floor, which serves as a literal ground for the composition. Whether soft, grainy wood or richly textured domestic carpet, this ground speaks to the interior nature of Hewitt’s work and its metaphoric and physical location within the built spaces of human construction and occupation." Also, riffing on the premise of "same but different" was the photo installation Untitled, in which a large starch-white slab was propped against the wall, scaled to the dimensions of the gallery's doorway. Here, Hewitt's iconography and conceptual choices echoed her previous work, as she insinuated this particular offering into the material legacies of the 1960s and 1970s. This exhibition confirms Hewitt's rightful place among a generation of artists confronting the historical legacies of the 1960s through an amalgamation of artistic strategies that test the premises of photography. It also raises the perplexing issue of what happens when formerly radical strategies have been tamed and naturalized into a generational style.

=== Midday (2009) ===
"Hewitt's work has been said to pose questions about 'the conundrum of the past and its connection to the contemporary moment.' In Midday [2009], Hewitt's latest series, a mandarin orange sits next to a copy of Manchild in the Promised Land, a nearly autobiographical account of the challenges of urban life for African Americans in 1950s New York. As with Hewitt’s earlier works, elements from the past are placed in relationship to more recent photographs, and thereby introduced into a contemporary context."

=== Untitled (Structures) ===
The exhibition at the Menil Collection, Untitled (Structures) (2013), was a collaboration with cinematographer Bradford Young and producer Karen Chien. Untitled is a series of short silent film vignettes created in 2012. The films include footage from 2010 to 2012 of locations where iconic civil rights photographs were taken in the 1950s and 1960s in Chicago, Memphis, and parts of Arkansas, which were all palpably transformed by the Great Migration. "Individual frames span 15 to 24 seconds and center around single details isolated from the archival images—a black body bent, a crack in the white marble stairs—that are then “restaged” and filmed on the same consecrated grounds." The works are 35mm film transferred to HD video, dual-channel video installation. In an Artforum interview, Hewitt says of the dual-channel video projection: "You can decide to look at one or the other, but your eyes have to contend with both." “Hewitt draws the tradition of the still life and combines it with the camera's ability to "shift the view of the world and hold it still".

=== Still-life series ===
In 2013, Hewitt released a series of photographs that were displayed at Sikkema Jenkins & Co. within tilted maple box-frames, that brings into focus the morphing of images in a studio into object-like artworks shown in a gallery. In Untitled (Perception), 2013, the block of maple that rests on a stack of three books, the only identifiable one being a collection of James Baldwin's essays, matches the work's wooden frame. Also nearby was an untitled work comprising two free-floating walls leaning against the gallery architecture. These minimalist objects are made of drywall and wood and were modeled on the texture and size of the gallery walls. They assert a content-free physicality that harmonized with the rest of the exhibition's pictorial and physical material.

== Exhibitions ==
Hewitt has staged a large number of solo shows at galleries and museums in the United States and internationally. Her notable solo shows include Make It Plain (2006), LAXART Gallery, Los Angeles; Momentum Series 15: Leslie Hewitt (2011), Institute of Contemporary Art, Boston; Sudden Glare of the Sun (2012), Contemporary Art Museum St. Louis; New Pictures: Leslie Hewitt, A Series of Projections (2016), Minneapolis Institute of Arts; Collective Stance: Leslie Hewitt (2016), The Power Plant, Toronto, Canada; Contemporary Focus: Leslie Hewitt (2018), The Menil Collection; and Leslie Hewitt (2022–2023), Dia Bridgehampton, Bridgehampton, New York

Hewitt has also participated in many group exhibitions, including the Whitney Biennial (2008); and A Movement in Every Direction: Legacies of the Great Migration (2022).
