= Songs of My People =

1992 book and multimedia project

- Publication date: February 1992
- ISBN: 978-0316109819

Songs of My People was a book, exhibition and multimedia project created and edited by organizers Eric Easter, Dudley M. Brooks and D. Michael Cheers. The book was published in February 1992 by Little, Brown, with an introduction by famed African American photographer Gordon Parks.

The project was named after an essay by Paul Robeson. It was launched in January 1990 as an attempt to record African American life through the eyes of 50 prominent African American photographers. It was defined as an effort to deliver balanced images of African Americans in response to what the organizers perceived as frequently negative portrayals of the community. During the first week of June 1990, project photographers were flown across the United States to capture various aspects of African American life. From 190,000 photographs taken for the project, 200 were selected for the book.

Of the project's photographs, 150 formed the basis of a highly attended international photo exhibition that opened in February 1992 at the Corcoran Gallery of Art in Washington, D.C. The exhibition traveled to the Afro-American Historical and Cultural Museum in Philadelphia between April and May 1992. For a show at the California Afro-American Museum beginning in May 1992, eight photographs by D Stevens and others related to the Los Angeles riots of 1992 were added.

The major tour and a second, smaller "paper" tour of 60 selected photographs was sponsored by Time Warner and shown at major museums and galleries including the Museum of the City of New York, the DuSable Museum in Chicago, and the Uffizi in Italy, among others. The Smithsonian Institution Traveling Exhibition Service (SITES) oversaw the international tour.

Notable contributing photographers included Pulitzer Prize winners Michel du Cille, Mathew Lewis, Ozier Muhammad, John H. White, and Keith Williams. Among the other photographers involved in the project were Howard Bingham, New York Times photographer Chester Higgins, Jr., Magnum member Eli Reed, Marilyn Nance, Bob Black, Jeffrey Salter, former White House photographer Sharon Farmer, Robin Tinay Sallie and Jeanne Moutoussamy-Ashe. The African-American people who appeared in the project's photographs included Zina Garrison, Quincy Jones, Jacob Lawrence, Thurgood Marshall, Gordon Parks, Colin L. Powell, Willy T. Ribbs, and Louis Wade Sullivan.

Film rights to a documentary based on the project were optioned by producer Quincy Jones, but the film was never produced. After the 1992-1994 tour, D. Michael Cheers donated the photographs to the Museum of Art and Archaeology at the University of Missouri.

The Museum of Fine Arts, Houston Archives houses the Songs of My People exhibition archive, 1990–1994. The archive includes approximately one-thousand working photoprints, including all images from the publication and the exhibitions. There are also extensive photographs and contact sheets created in the course of the project. Photographic subjects include Colin Powell, Nelson Mandela, Winnie Mandela, Roy DeCarava, Muhammad Ali, Jessie Jackson, Jacob Lawerence, John Lee Hooker, Bo Diddley, Quincy Jones, Cleo Fields, Thurgood Marshall, Atallah Shabazz, David Dinkins, Marion Barry, George Clinton and Willie T. Ribbs. Many other photographs capture life as lived by ordinary African Americans.
