= Janna Ireland =

American photographer (born 1985)

Janna Ireland (born 1985) is an African-American photographer based in Los Angeles.

== Biography ==
Janna Ireland was born in 1985 in Philadelphia. She studied photography at NYU, received her MFA at UCLA, and now lives and works in Los Angeles. Ireland photographs a wide range of subject matter from portraits and still lifes to the urban landscape, and her photographs have been exhibited internationally. Since 2016, she has photographed the buildings designed by African-American architect, Paul R. Williams, who was the first black architect admitted to the American Institute of Architecture (AIA). In 2020, she published a book featuring 200 of these photographs, which were collected in a volume titled, Regarding Paul R. Williams: A Photographer's View. Ireland continued her work on Paul R. Williams as a Peter E. Pool Research Fellow at the Nevada Museum of Art. In 2022, an exhibition of her photographs of Williams' Nevada buildings opened at the Nevada Museum of Art. She is an assistant professor in the Department of Art and Art History at Occidental College.

== Education ==
Janna Ireland is a graduate of the Philadelphia High School for Creative and Performing Arts in 2003, where she earned her major in creative writing. She received her BFA in Photography and Imaging from NYU Tisch School of Arts in 2007. She earned her MFA in art in 2013 from the University of California, Los Angeles.

== Artworks ==
Ireland has an extensive career in editorial photography, and her work has appeared in The New York Times Magazine, The Atlantic, Architectural Digest, Introspective Magazine, the Los Angeles Review of Books, The New Yorker, Harper's Magazine, and L.A. Magazine.

She is best known for her series of photographs of buildings designed by African-American architect, Paul R. Williams. Beginning in 2016, she traveled around southern California photographing the buildings that he designed at the height of his career, from the 1920s-1940s. She has photographed several dozen structures designed by Williams.

== Exhibitions ==
=== Solo exhibitions ===
2013	"The Spotless Mirror," Schneider Gallery, Chicago, IL
2014	"The Spotless Mirror," Tyler Wood Gallery, San Francisco, CA
2017	"There is Only One Paul R. Williams," WUHO Gallery, Los Angeles, CA
2018	"Open Studio," Arlene Schnitzer Gallery, Harvard-Westlake School, Los Angeles, CA
2019	"Familiar Presence," Agility, Los Angeles, CA "The Valley Below," Antenna Works, New Orleans, LA
2021	"Looking In, Looking Out," Carolyn Glasoe Bailey Foundation, Ojai, CA
2022	"Janna Ireland on the Architectural Legacy of Paul Revere Williams in Nevada," Nevada Museum of Art, Reno, NV

=== Selected group exhibitions ===
2005	"Common Grounds," Steinhardt School of Education, New York University, New York, NY
2007	"Access," Harriet's Alter Ego, Brooklyn, NY "Show 3," Tisch School of the Arts, New York University, New York, NY
2008	"The Lack of Desire," Brooklyn Arts Council, Brooklyn, NY
2012	"BOOM," Pacific Design Center/d.e.n. contemporary, Los Angeles, CA
2013	"The Photographic Self," Woman Made Gallery, Chicago, IL "Face of California," Santa Paula Art Museum, Santa Paula, CA
2014	"If We Came From Nowhere Here, Why Can't We Go Somewhere There?" Vivid Solutions, Washington, DC
2015	"On Being Black," Arnika Dawkins Gallery, Atlanta, GA
2016	"If We Came From Nowhere Here, Why Can't We Go Somewhere There?" Trenton Artworks, Trenton, NJ
2017	"Clickbait," The Front, New Orleans, LA
2018	"Odds and Ends Art Book Fair," Yale University Art Gallery, New Haven, CT
2019	"Photoville LA," Annenberg Space for Photography, Los Angeles, CA "The BEACON Project," Torrance Art Museum, Torrance, CA "Inter/Section," Rotterdam Photo Festival, Rotterdam, Netherlands "Awareness," DNJ Gallery, Santa Monica, Los Angeles, CA "Beacon," Torrance Art Museum, Torrance, CA
2020	"What Does Democracy Look Like?," Museum of Contemporary Photography, Chicago, IL "Sanctuary: Recent Acquisitions to the Permanent Collection," California African American Museum, Los Angeles, CA "Binder of Women," Track 16, Los Angeles, CA
2021	"Sanctuary: Recent Acquisitions to the Permanent Collection," California African American Museum, Los Angeles, CA

== Collections ==
Janna Ireland's photographs are held in the permanent collections of major metropolitan museums including, the Los Angeles County Museum of Art, the California African American Museum, the Santa Barbara Museum of Art, and the Museum of Contemporary Photography.

== Honors and awards ==
2002	Pennsylvania Governor's School for the Arts, Erie, PA
2011	Eddie Adams Workshop, Jeffersonville, NY Look3 Festival of the Photograph Student Scholarship, Charlottesville, VA
2013	Snider Prize, Museum of Contemporary Photography, Columbia College Chicago, Chicago, IL
2014	LOOKbetween Festival participant, Charlottesville, VA New York Times Portfolio Review participant, New York, NY
2018	DCA Trailblazer, Department of Cultural Affairs, Los Angeles, CA Arlene Director Schnitzer '47 Visiting Artist, Harvard-Westlake School, Los Angeles, CA
2020	Paris Photo - Aperture Foundation PhotoBook Awards, First PhotoBook shortlist

== Authored books ==
- Janna Ireland, Regarding Paul R. Williams: A Photographer's View. Santa Monica: Angel City Press, 2020

== See also ==
- List of black photographers
