= Sharon Farmer =

American photographer

Chief Official White House Photographer
- In office September 1998 – January 20, 2001
- President: Bill Clinton
- Preceded by: Bob McNeely
- Succeeded by: Eric Draper

Personal details
- Born: June 10, 1951 (age 75) Washington, D.C., U.S.
- Education: Ohio State University
- Occupation: Photojournalist

Sharon Camille Farmer (born June 10, 1951) is an American photographer. She was the first African-American woman to be hired as a White House photographer and the first African American and first female to be Director of the White House Photography office.

== Biography ==
Farmer was born and raised in Washington, D.C., and graduated from Ohio State University in 1974 with a degree in photography. While a student she became a member of Delta Sigma Theta sorority, vice president of the student government, and served as editor for the school newspaper, Our Choking Times.

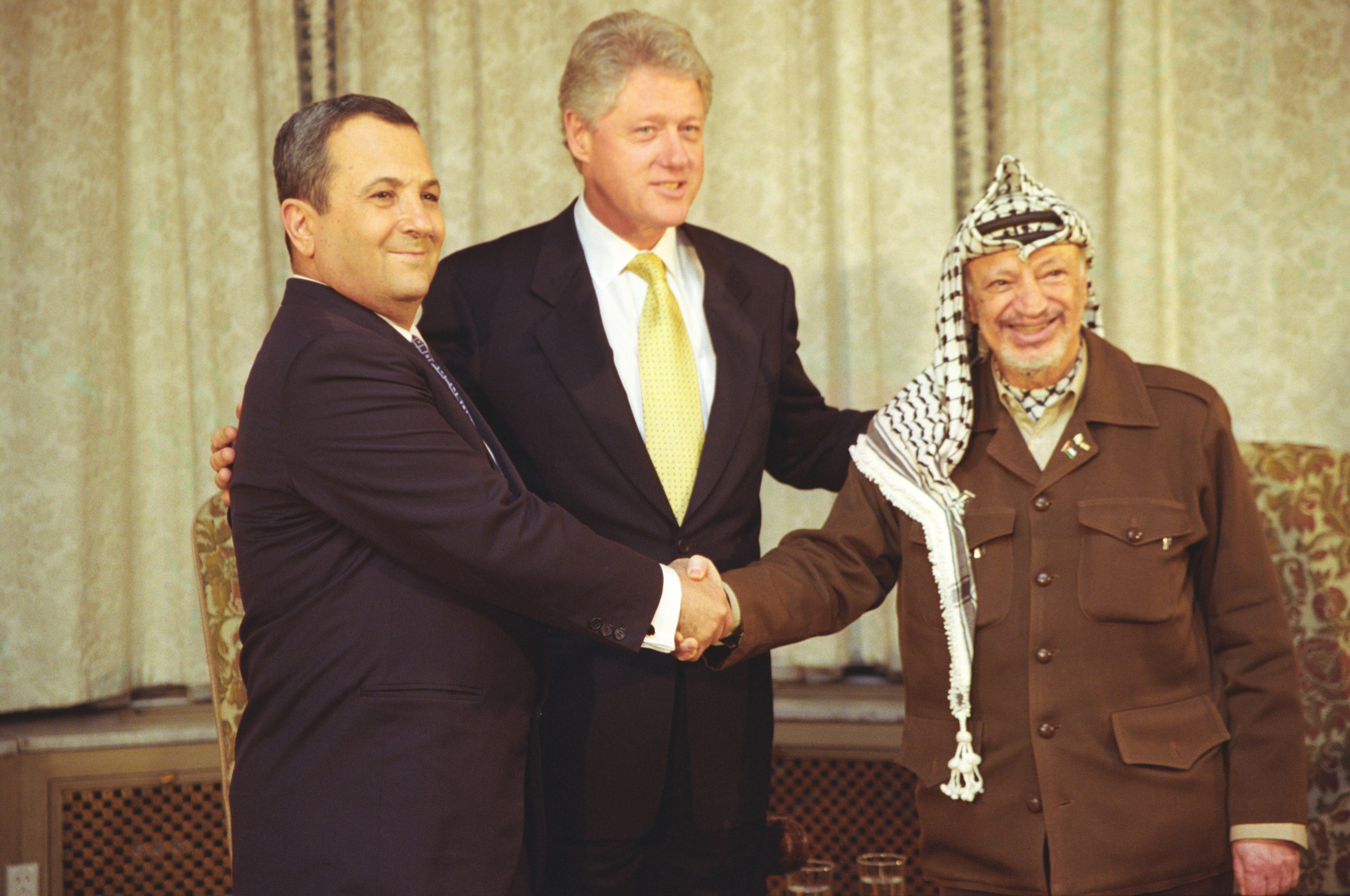
Sharon Farmer photo of Palestinian Authority chairman Yasser Arafat, U.S. President Bill Clinton and Israeli Prime Minister Ehud Barak who came together for peace negotiations in 2000.

== Career ==
Farmer started her career in 1974 shooting album covers. Her freelance photography grew to photojournalism and she worked for Smithsonian Institution, The Washington Post and the American Association for the Advancement of Science.

In 1993, Sharon Farmer was hired to photograph for The White House covering President Bill Clinton and first lady Hillary Rodham Clinton. Later, Farmer was promoted to Director of White House Photography and became the first African American and first woman to hold this position.Farmer has stated that one reason why the White House Photography Office used so much film during the first six and one-half years of the Clinton presidency is because "Our purpose is to serve the American democracy by creating a visual record of its presidency...We are creating a legacy, not for public relations purposes, but as an archive for the future."

Farmer's work has been included in multiple exhibits, including: "Songs of My People," "Art against AIDS," "Gospel in the Projects," "Twenty Years on the Mall," "Washington, DC-Beijing Exchange," and "Our View of Struggle."Her work has also been featured in numerous books, including Martin Duberman's Hold Tight Gently: Michael Callen, Essex Hemphill, and the Battlefield of AIDS; Dave Marsh's Bruce Springsteen on Tour: 1968-2005; Hilary Clinton's An Invitation to the White House: At Home with History; Sharon Rosier Hyson's President Clinton's Legacy to Africa; and Songs of My People, the book, exhibition, and multimedia project edited by Eric Easter, Dudley M. Brooks, and D. Michael Cheers.

== Education ==
Sharon Farmer majored in photography and minored in music at Ohio State University in Columbus, Ohio, where she received her Bachelor of Arts degree.
