= Lukman Olaonipekun =

Nigerian photojournalist

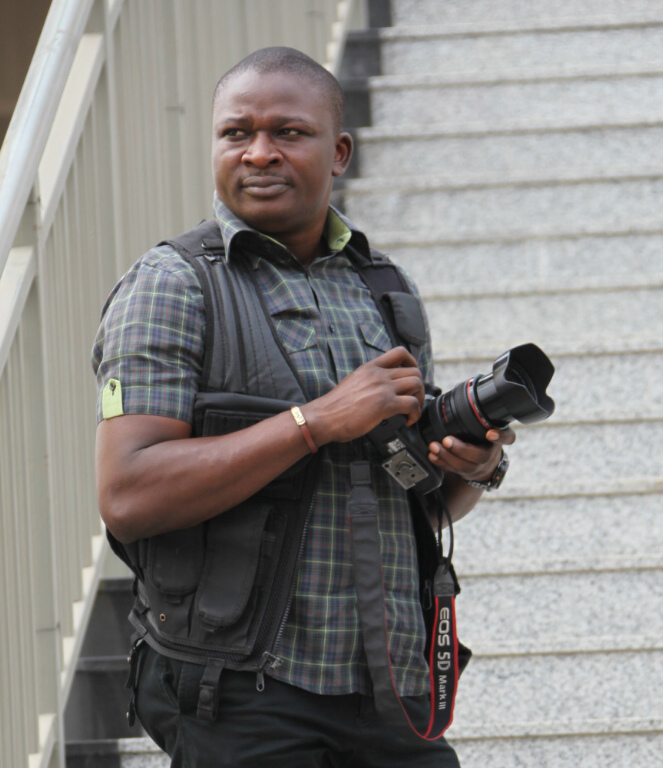
- Born: December 7, 1975 (age 50); Itesiwaju
- Citizenship: Nigeria
- Occupation: Documentary Photographer
- Website: www.lukeshphoto.com

Lukman Olaonipekun, popularly known as Lukesh, is a Nigerian documentary photographer born on December 7, 1975, in Itesiwaju Local Government, Oyo State, Nigeria. He began his photography career in 1998. Olaonipekun is the official personal photographer to the former governor of Lagos State Babatunde Fashola SAN who went on to become Nigeria's Minister Power, Works and Housing between 2015 and 2023.

== Career ==
Lukman is one of Nigeria's pioneering political photographer, standing at the forefront of Nigeria's visual documentation tradition. He boasts of an archive of about seven million images with extensive visual records of governance spanning official engagements, policy milestones and the human dimensions of leadership.

In 2003, he became the personal photographer to Honourable Idowu Obasa, the Onigbongbo Local Government Chairman in Ikeja, Lagos and just three years later, he became the personal photographer of the Governor of the State, His Excellency Babatunde Fashola in 2006.

Lukman is the author of BRF: A Story in Photographs, a book which documents the life of a serving governor in Nigeria. His book The Fashola Years was published in 2015 by Quramo Publishing under the Qbooks imprint. His other project include Beginning with Buhari: A New Beginning (2016), Infrastructure Renewal in Nigeria: A Photographic Journey through the Power, Works and Housing Sectors, Beyond Infrastructure, This is Lagos, This is Buhari, Katsina: Its History, People and Governance, and Discover Nigeria.

His portfolio and expertise has positioned him as a visual historian, archivist, curator, publisher and author, chronicling power, governance and national transformation in Nigeria's Fourth Republic through imagery.

== Exhibitions ==
- 2009 - Then and Now at City Hall, Lagos Island
- 2013 - My Contract with Lagos at Blue Roof, Lagos
- 2013 - Lagos: Being and Becoming at City Hall, Lagos
- 2015 - Eyes of History

== Awards ==
- 2011 – Nigeria Photography Awards Best Culture Photo of the Year
- 2011 – Nigeria Photography Awards Best Current Affairs Photo of the Year
- 2012 – Nigeria Photography Awards Best Lifestyle Photo of the Year
- 2012 – Nigeria Photography Awards Best Nature Photo of the Year
- 2012 – Nigeria Photography Awards Best Wild Life Photo of the Year
- 2012 – Nigeria Photography Awards Best Advertising and Commercial Photo of the Year
