= David Ogburn =

American photographer born 1942

- Born: December 14, 1942 (age 83); Brooklyn, New York
- Known for: photography

David "Oggi" Ogburn (born 1942) is an American photographer. He is known for his photographs of Washington, DC as well as his photographs of musicians.

Ogburn was born in Brooklyn, New York on December 14, 1942. He studied at Howard University where he obtained his Bachelor of Arts degree and his Master of Arts degree.

Ogburn's work was included in the 2025 exhibition Photography and the Black Arts Movement, 1955–1985 at the National Gallery of Art.
