= Edward Elcha =

American photographer

William Edward Elcha (1885 – November 3, 1939) was an American photographer known for his Jazz Age Broadway photographs of Harlem performers and celebrities in the 1920s and 1930s. The Harry Ransom Center has his photographs in its collection. He also partnered with Percy Tappin, and The National Museum of African American History and Culture has a photo postcard from their studio of the Jenkins Orphanage Band from Charleston, South Carolina.

== Early life ==
Elcha was born and grew up in Springfield, Massachusetts. His father William was a waiter at the Haynes Hotel and his mother Cornelia A. Vandall was a painter.

== Career ==
Elcha apprenticed with Springfield photographer George Van Norman. He established his own studio in 1913. In 1915 he joined Aime Dupont Studio, a performing arts portrait studio in Manhattan where he worked for two years before joining Bachrach Studio and then Strand Studio in 1918. He partnered with J. Montanya in 1920 before becoming New York staff photographer for the Pittsburgh Courier. Elcha had various other studios and partnerships during his career.

Elcha documented performers and social gatherings in Jazz Age New York City. He married jazz singer Mary Elcha. He was friends with fellow photographer James VanDerZee.

He also painted, including nudes, and was busted by New York Society for the Suppression of Vice in 1930, but a judge Simpson referred to his paintings Sleeping Venus, Springtime, and Annunciation as masterful and he was back in business. He photographed Bessie Smith and her funeral procession, Helene Denizon, Kay Hamilton, Don Dickerman, Eva Tanguay, and Johnny Hudgins. In the summer of 1928 he became the Majestic Theatrical Circuit's photographer. He operated Progress Studio.

Elcha died of a heart attack November 3, 1939, at his home at 225 West 112th Street.

Photographer Anthony Barboza researched Elcha and wrote an article illustrated with a couple of dozen Elcha photos in American Legacy magazine in 2007.
