= August Udoh =

Nigerian photographer

- Citizenship: Nigeria
- Occupation: Photographer

August Udoh is a Nigerian photographer best known for his photography of the Dambe traditional boxers in Nigeria. He has done many celebrity portraits including those for M.I Abaga, eLDee, Eva Alordiah, Burna Boy, YCee, Iceprince and others. In 2017, he created a photo series about athletes with disabilities to shed light on their struggles. In 2018, he did a photography series "Dambe" highlighting the underground martial arts club called Dambe. He created the series as a way for the photographs to be "shedding light upon such regional disparities."
