= Novo Isioro =

Nigerian photographer

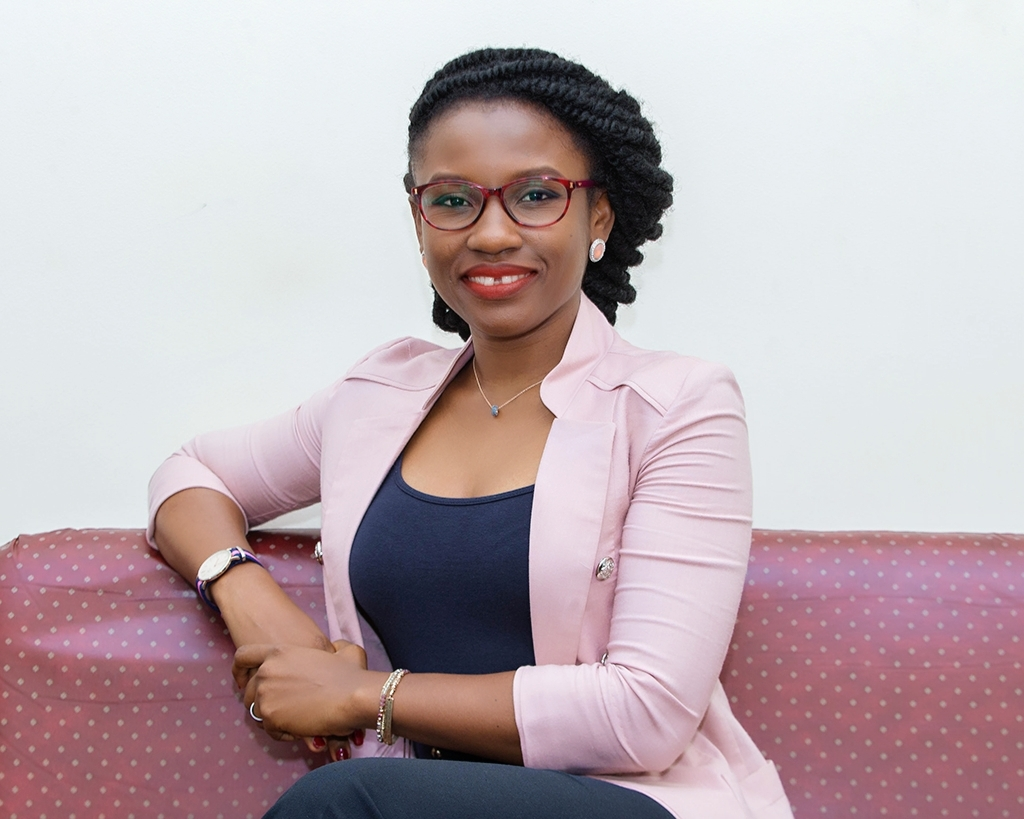
- Novo Isioro
- Born: Lilian Novo Isioro; Ogba, Lagos, Nigeria
- Education: New York Film Academy
- Occupation: Visual Communication Strategist/Photographer
- Notable work: Nigeria Unity Story

Novo Isioro (born on 9 February) is a Nigerian visual communication strategist and photographer. Between 2015 and 2019, Novo was Nigeria's Presidential Documentary Photographer in the Office of the Vice President Yemi Osinbajo, SAN. She was the first female to hold this position. She combined this with her role as Special Assistant on Visual Communication.

In 2018, Novo founded ANISZA Foundation and Gallery, and serves as its curator. ANISZA is focused on educating secondary school students Nigeria's history using photography to illustrate its trajectory to advance the cause of peace and unity in Nigeria.

== Career ==
Novo started her career at the age of 17 just after her high school education and at age 25 she became the CEO of NOVOIMAGES (a photography and image management company located in Lagos, Nigeria).

Novo advanced her photography career in 2012 shortly after her compulsory one-year National Youth Service Corps service. She participated in several photography workshops and master-classes around the world.

Novo's 2012 documentary series “the corporate life of a market woman” led her to the screens of Al Jazeera; airwaves of BBC –the strands; and feature stories in Le-Monde, Paris; Tarkett, Paris, and others.

=== Work with the Nigerian government ===
Novo Isioro was appointed as Special Assistant on Visual Communication to the President, under President Muhammadu Buhari administration. A role she carried on with Vice President Yemi Osinbajo, SAN, as his personal photographer from 2016-2019.

== Peace and Unity Project ==
In 2018, Novo founded the ANISZA Foundation and Gallery, and serves as its curator. She convened Nigeria's first ever unity story exhibition. The aim of the foundation is to educate secondary school students in Nigerian history using photography, in addition to other tools.

== Workshops and projects ==
- ANISZA, Abuja 2018
- NIPHEC – Nigeria Photography Expo & Conference, Nigeria 2015
- Bakassi Pennisul’Art, Cameroon 2014
- Masterclass with Akinbode Akinbiyi (Sudanese Photographers Organisation/Invisible Borders) Sudan, 2013
- Invisible Borders Trans-African Photography Project 4th Edition Road trip Nigeria-Cameroon-Gabon, 2012
- TNI-ACP, Lagos 2014
