= Zoë Charlton =

American artist (born 1973)

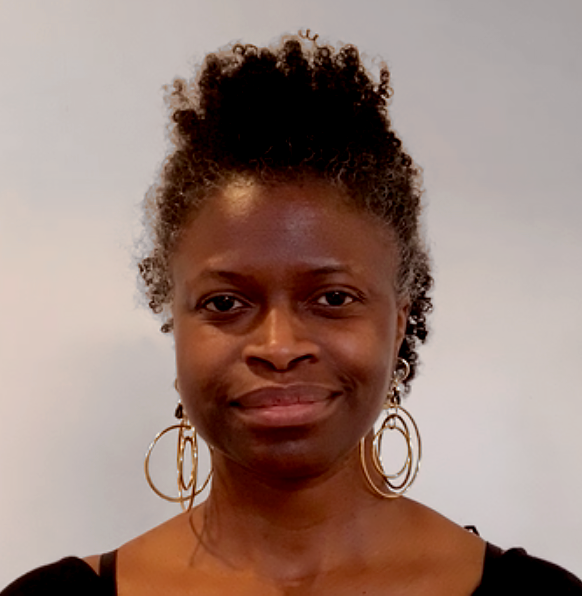

Zoë Charlton (born 1973) is an American contemporary artist and the direct of the School of Art and a tenured full professor of Art at George Mason University.

== Biography ==
Charlton was born at Eglin Air Force Base, Florida in 1973. She obtained a Bachelor of Arts degree in painting and drawing from Florida State University and went on to receive a Master of Arts degree from the University of Texas at Austin. She has participated in residencies at Ucross Foundation (WY, 2019), Artpace (TX, 2018), the Skowhegan School of Painting and Sculpture (ME, 2001), Creative Alliance in Baltimore|The Patterson Residency for the Creative Alliance (MD, 2003). Charlton also participated in the Drawing Center's Viewing (NY) program from 2001 to 2003.

From 2003-2022, Charlton taught full-time at American University (DC) and received tenure in 2009. She served as Chair of the Department of Art from 2015-2018 and was the first Black American tenured, Full Professor in the Department. She is currently a tenured, Full Professor of Art and Director of the School of Art at George Mason University.

Charlton's work has been in group exhibitions including the Zacheta National Gallery of Art (Warsaw, Poland), Haas & Fischer Gallery (Zurich, Switzerland), the Contemporary Arts Museum Houston, the Studio Museum in Harlem (NYC, NY), Clementine Gallery (NYC, NY), the Wendy Cooper Gallery (Chicago, IL), the Delaware Contemporary (DE), the Harvey B. Gantt Center (NC), Crystal Bridges Museum of American Art (AR), Studio Museum of Harlem (NY), and Contemporary Art Museum (TX).

She was included in the first cohort of the Collaborative Residency for Artists and Apprentices at Morgan Conservatory in Cleveland.

== Collections ==
Works by Charlton are in the collections of the Crystal Bridges Museum of American Art, the Herbert F. Johnson Museum of Art, The Phillips Collection, the Rose Art Museum and the Birmingham Museum of Art.

== Awards ==
- Pollock-Krasner Grant (2012)
- Rubys Artist Grant (2014), to support a series of figure drawings called Cultural Currency: Tourists, Trophies, and Tokens
