= Arthur P. Bedou =

African-American photographer

- Born: July 6, 1882; New Orleans, Louisiana
- Died: June 2, 1966 (aged 83)
- Known for: Documentary and portrait photography
- Spouse: Lillia Bedou

Arthur Paul Bedou (July 6, 1882 – July 2, 1966) was an African-American photographer based in New Orleans. Bedou was, for a time, the personal photographer of Booker T. Washington, and documented the last decade of Washington's life. He also documented campus life at Xavier University of Louisiana, the Tuskegee Institute, and the city life of New Orleans, especially the city's black residents.

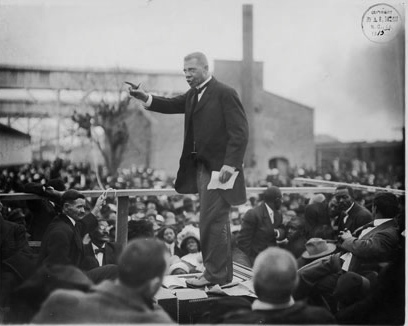
Booker T. Washington, New Orleans, 1915; photograph by Arthur P. Bedou.

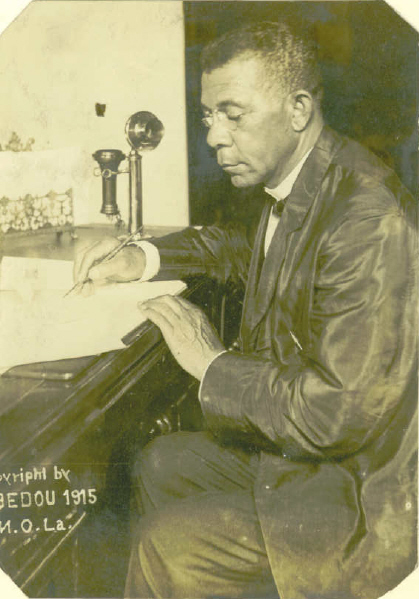
Booker T. Washington at desk, 1915; photograph by Arthur P. Bedou

== Biography ==
Arthur Paul Bedou was born in New Orleans, Louisiana, in 1882, one of five children of Armand Bedou and Marie Celeste Coustaut. His family was poor and he received very little education; as a photographer he was largely self-taught. Bedou worked for a time as a clerk, but by 1899 he was taking pictures, and his career started in earnest when a photograph he took of a solar eclipse in 1900 received wide notice.

In 1903 Bedou documented a conference at Tuskegee Institute in the hope of gaining visibility for his work. Booker T. Washington saw some of his photographs and invited Bedou to accompany him as his personal photographer, preferring Bedou over other candidates like C. M. Battey in part for his ability to produce dynamic images of unfolding events. Most of Bedou's photographs of Washington were taken between 1908 and 1915, the year of Washington's death. Among other tasks, he accompanied Washington on his summer tours with the object of producing an album of each trip. To supplement his uncertain income from these travels, he had some of the photographs he took made into postcards, Christmas cards, and calendars. His position brought him further commissions to photograph notables both black and white, including George Washington Carver, Theodore Roosevelt, Andrew Carnegie, and Julius Rosenwald.

Through the connection to Washington, who was the school's founding principal, Bedou was invited to become official photographer of the Tuskegee Institute. Shortly after Washington's death, however, he was replaced as the school's official photographer by Battey, who at the time was favored by campus officials for various reasons. He was also in demand by other black colleges and schools such as Fisk University to document life on their campuses, and by professional organizations such as the National Negro Business League, the National Medical Association, and the National Baptist Convention.

In the 1920s, Bedou opened his own photography studio in New Orleans, where he photographed everything from black families and their children to the laying of the cornerstone at Corpus Christi Church to the visits of jazz bands and celebrity speakers. His photographs often appeared in both the Louisiana Weekly (a newspaper with a primarily black circulation) and the general-circulation newspaper Louisiana Times-Picayune. His photographs won several awards over the years, including the gold medal at the 1907 Jamestown Tercentennial Exposition.

Bedou prospered and invested in real estate and companies like the People's Industrial Life Insurance Company of Louisiana, of which he was for many years a director and vice-president.

Bedou photographed numerous events, activities, and portraits around the Xavier University of Louisiana campus from about 1917 to the late 1950s. When he died in 1966, he left much of his fortune to educational institutions, and his wife, Lillia Bedou, founded a scholarship in his honor at Xavier University of Louisiana. Since her death, the scholarship has been known as the Arthur and Lillia Bedou Scholarship. Xavier University Archives & Special Collections also holds an extensive collection of his photographs.

== Personal life ==
Bedou was a devout Catholic, a parishioner at the former St Katherine Church on Tulane Ave.
