= John H. White (photojournalist) =

American photojournalist (born 1945)

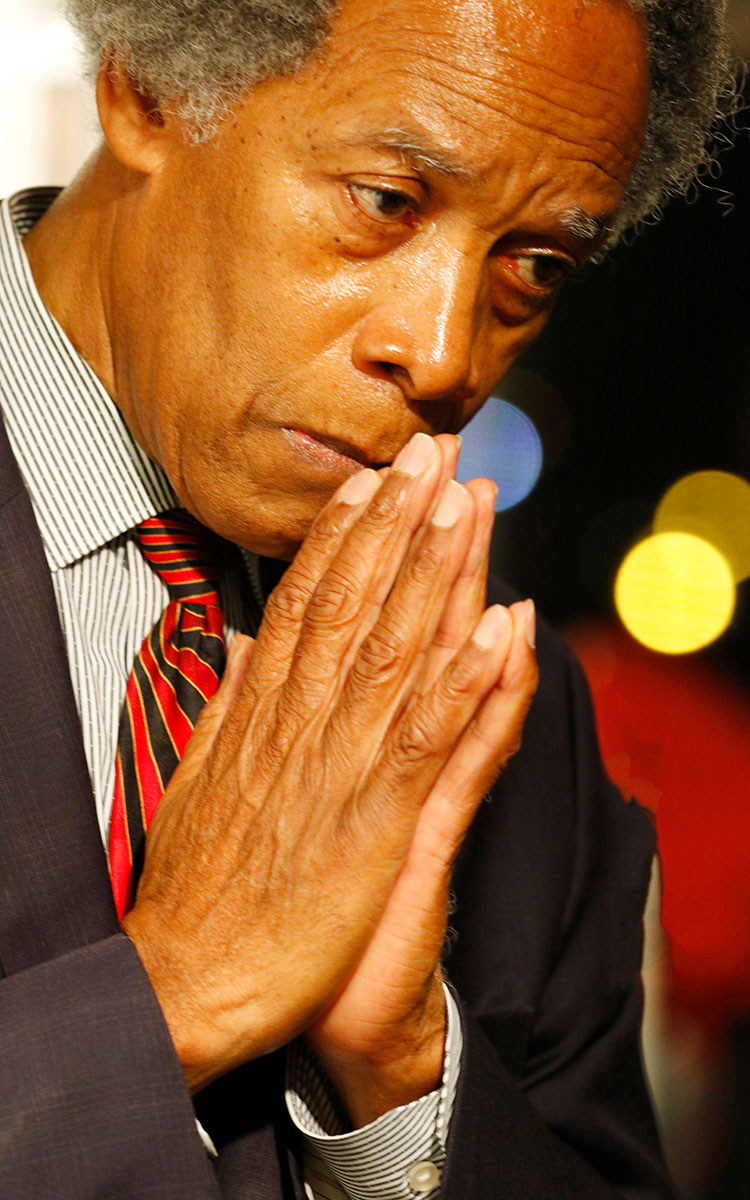
- White at Columbia College Chicago in 2017
- Born: March 18, 1945 (age 81); Lexington, North Carolina, U.S.
- Education: Central Piedmont Community College (AAS)
- Occupations: Photojournalist, educator
- Employers: Chicago Daily News (1969–1978); Chicago Sun-Times (1978–2013); Columbia College Chicago
- Awards: Pulitzer Prize for Feature Photography (1982)
- Military career
- Allegiance: United States
- Branch: United States Marine Corps
- Service years: 1966–1968
- Website: keepinflight.com

John H. White (born March 18, 1945) is an American photojournalist. He was a staff photographer for the Chicago Daily News from 1969 to 1978 and for the Chicago Sun-Times from 1978 until 2013. He won the 1982 Pulitzer Prize for Feature Photography for "consistently excellent work on a variety of subjects".

In 1973 and 1974, White photographed African American life in Chicago for the Environmental Protection Agency's Documerica project, and those photographs are now held by the National Archives. He began teaching photojournalism at Columbia College Chicago in 1978, and he published two books of photographs of Cardinal Joseph Bernardin.

== Early life and education ==
White was born on March 18, 1945, in Lexington, North Carolina, the son of Reid Ross White, a minister. When he was nine, a teacher told him that he would grow up to work on a garbage truck; his father replied that this would be fine as long as he was the one driving it. At 13, he bought his first camera with 50 cents and ten Bazooka bubble gum wrappers. After the family's church burned down, his father asked him to photograph its ruins and rebuilding, which White has described as his first assignment.

White earned an Associate of Applied Science degree in commercial art and advertising design from Central Piedmont Community College in Charlotte in 1966.

He served as a photographer in the United States Marine Corps from 1966 to 1968, then worked as a darkroom technician from 1968 to 1969.

== Career ==
=== Chicago Daily News and Chicago Sun-Times ===
White joined the Chicago Daily News as a photographer in 1969. He was president of the Chicago Press Photographers Association from 1977 to 1978. When the Daily News ceased publication in 1978, he moved to the Chicago Sun-Times, becoming one of the first African Americans hired by the paper.

In 1982, White won the Pulitzer Prize for Feature Photography for "consistently excellent work on a variety of subjects". White is one of six Black photojournalists to have won an individual Pulitzer Prize.

White published two books of photographs of Joseph Bernardin, the Archbishop of Chicago: This Man Bernardin (1996), with text by Eugene Kennedy, and The Final Journey of Joseph Cardinal Bernardin (1997).

On May 30, 2013, the Sun-Times laid off its entire photography staff of nearly 30 people, including White, and said it would rely on freelancers and on reporters taking photographs. In an interview with NPR after the layoff, White said, "I will not curse the darkness. I will light candles," and said he lived by "three 'F' words: faith, focus and flight".

=== Documerica ===
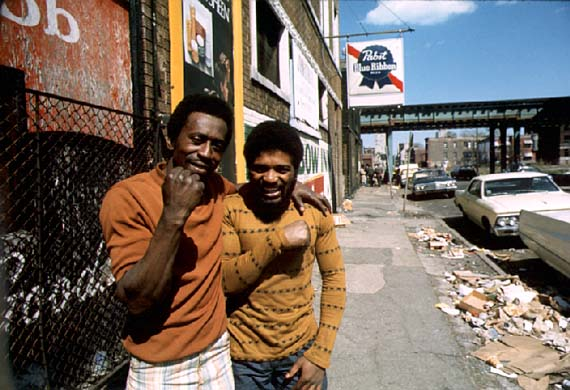
A photograph by White of Chicago's South Side, taken for Documerica in May 1974

Documerica was a photography project run by the Environmental Protection Agency from 1972 to 1977. While still working for the Daily News, White photographed Chicago for the project from June to October 1973 and again in the spring of 1974. His photographs focused on the city's African American communities and covered activism, music and the arts, youth, housing, employment, religion, and street life. They are held by the National Archives' Still Pictures Branch and have no copyright restrictions.

=== Teaching ===
White began teaching photojournalism part-time at Columbia College Chicago in 1978, and he later became an artist in residence there; he was still teaching at the college in 2016. Contemporary Black Biography lists him as head of the college's photojournalism department from 1988. He was also an adjunct lecturer in photojournalism at Northwestern University's Medill School of Journalism, and an instructor at the Eddie Adams Workshop.

== Exhibitions ==
In 1973, White and fellow African American photojournalists Ovie Carter, Bob Black, and Howard Simmons taught photography at the South Side Community Art Center in Chicago and mounted an exhibition there titled Through the Eyes of Blackness. The center restaged the exhibition fifty years later, opening it on September 16, 2023.

White was one of the photographers selected for the 1990 project Songs of My People. His work was included in the 2025 exhibition Photography and the Black Arts Movement, 1955–1985 at the National Gallery of Art.

== Publications ==
- White, John H.; Kennedy, Eugene (1996). This Man Bernardin. Chicago: Loyola Press. ISBN 9780829409093.
- White, John H. (1997). The Final Journey of Joseph Cardinal Bernardin. Chicago: Loyola Press. ISBN 9780829409673.

== Awards and honors ==
- 1982 Pulitzer Prize for Feature Photography
- Three National Headliner Awards
- Photographer of the Year, Chicago Press Photographers Association (1972, 1973, 1975, and 1986)
- 1989 Joseph A. Sprague Memorial Award, National Press Photographers Association
- 1993 induction into the Chicago Journalism Hall of Fame
- 1999 Chicago Medal of Merit
- 1999 Studs Terkel Award
- 2013 Lucie Award for Achievement in Photojournalism
