= Roy Lewis (photographer) =

American photographer born 1937

- Born: July 24, 1937 (age 88); Natchez, Mississippi
- Known for: photography

Roy Lewis (born 1937) is an American photographer. He is known for his photojournalism as well as videography.

Lewis was born in Natchez, Mississippi on July 24, 1937. He led a peripatetic life as a young man, residing in Illinois, Kansas, and Texas as well as serving in the United States Army. His early photo-journalistic carer included working as a photographer for the Johnson Publishing Company. Lewis also created photographs of Chicago's Wall of Respect. One of his images of the Wall of Respect is included in the collection of the National Museum of African American History & Culture.

In 1974 Lewis traveled to Zaire, Africa to video the Foreman vs. Ali, boxing match referred to as The Rumble in the Jungle. Some of his footage was included in the 1996 documentary film When We Were Kings.

In 1995 his photos were included in the book The Million Man March published by Three Rivers Press.

Lewis's work was included in the 2025 exhibition Photography and the Black Arts Movement, 1955–1985 at the National Gallery of Art.
