= Darrel Ellis =

American painter and photographer (1958–1992)

- Born: 1958; Bronx
- Died: 1992 (aged 33–34)
- Known for: Photography

Darrel Ellis (1958–1992) was an American painter and photographer.

Ellis was born in 1958 in Bronx, New York. In 1979 Ellis was the recipient of a P.S.1 Contemporary Art Center studio residency. He shared the space with fellow artist James Wentzy. Ellis also studied at Cooper Union and the Whitney Independent Study program.

Ellis participated in the 1989 exhibition Witnesses: Against Our Vanishing at the Artists Space gallery in New York. In 1992 Ellis work was included in the Museum of Modern Art's New Photography 8 exhibition. Ellis died the same year at the age of 33 from an AIDS-related illness.

A 2022 retrospective of Ellis's work entitled Darrel Ellis: Regeneration was organized by the Baltimore Museum of Art and the Bronx Museum. The exhibition traveled to the Columbia Museum of Art, and the Milwaukee Art Museum,

His work was included in the 2025 exhibition Photography and the Black Arts Movement, 1955–1985 at the National Gallery of Art.

Ellis's works are in the collection of the Museum of Modern Art, and the Whitney Museum of American Art.
