= Dayo Adedayo =

Nigerian photographer (born 1964)

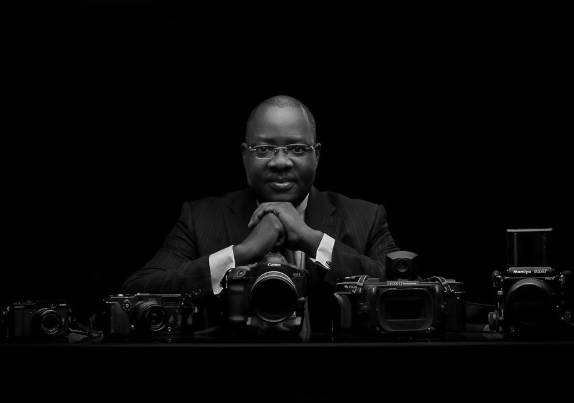
- Born: 1 July 1964 (age 62); Ijebu-Ife, Ogun State, Nigeria
- Education: Westminster University Westminster College
- Occupations: Photographer; Travel writer
- Years active: 40 years
- Notable work: Founder of Dayo Adedayo (DAP) Experience Centre, Lagos, Nigeria Photography: "See Dubai and Die" Ovation Magazine Books: "Nigeria 2.0", "Nigeria - A Timeless Beauty" Other Photography: One-Hundred Naira Centenary Note, Nigeria Centenary Monopoly Board, Nigerian e-Passport
- Spouse: Kudi Badmus (m.1 July 2009 - present)
- Website: dayoadedayo.com

Oladayo Mukaila Adedayo, known as 'dayo Adedayo (born 1 July 1964) is a Nigerian documentary photographer, author and cultural anthropologist known for his photographic documentation of Nigeria's landscapes, cultures and heritage.

He is the author of several books on Nigerian culture, tourism and heritage, including Nigeria 2.0.

Over the span of more than two decades, Adedayo has travelled across and documented all 36 states in the country.

== Education ==
Adedayo had his primary education in Nigeria at Children's Home School, Molete, Ibadan, Oyo State, and Moslem Primary School, Idofe, Oke-Ife, Ijebu Ife, Ogun State. He passed his secondary school certificate at Ijebu Ife Community Grammar School. He went on to study Photography Arts at Westminster College and the University of Westminster, U.K. He is the author of Rivers State Our Proud Heritage, Tour Nigeria, and Lagos State, A Visual Portrait. According to published reports, Adedayo has created an archive comprising millions of photographs documenting Nigeria..

== Career ==
Adedayo started out as a social photographer, later freelancer for Ovation Magazine International, before venturing into documentary photography. Published sources report that Adedayo has travelled across Nigeria documenting its landscapes, communities and cultural heritage.

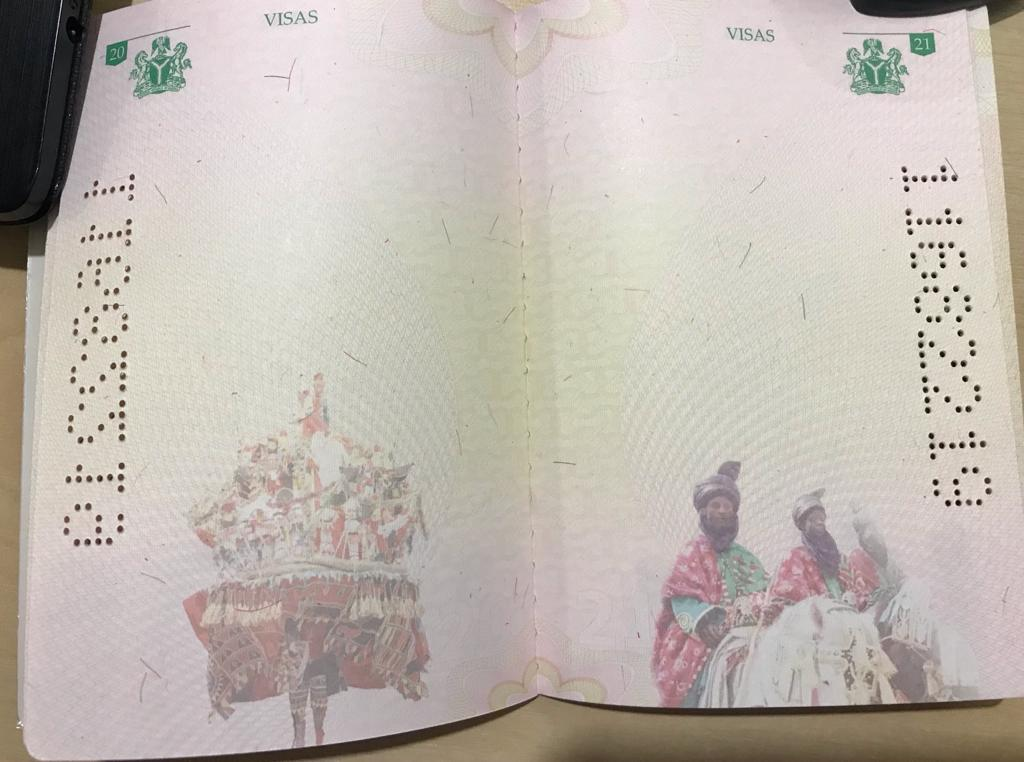
Nigeria's e-passport showing Adedayos images

Photographs by Adedayo have been used in the Nigerian e-passport and displayed at Lagos and Abuja international airports.

In 2013, Dayo Adedayo provided images used in City of Lagos Edition Monopoly board and for Centenary Edition Monology Nigeria.

In 2014, to commemorate Nigeria's nationhood, he was commissioned to produce images for the centenary One hundred Naira note. During this period his photographs were being displayed at the Presidential Wing of the Nnamdi International Airport, Abuja.

He was a member of a committee saddled with the responsibility of setting up photography in the pilot project curriculum for the National Board for Technical Education (NBTE), the regulatory body for Nigerian Polytechnics.

'dayo Adedayos DAP Experience Centre

In 2023, Adedayo opened the Dayo Adedayo Photography (DAP) Experience Centre, located along the Lekki–Epe Expressway in Lagos. The facility includes photographic exhibition spaces, a studio, a café and a library.

Africa's Best Tourism Photographer of The Year 2026

In 2026, Adedayo received the Africa's Best Tourism Photographer of the Year award from the Africa Tourism Awards. at the Africa Tourism Awards (also known as The Balearica Awards) held in Hilton, Canary Wharf, London, in recognition of his contributions to tourism photography and the documentation of Nigeria's cultural heritage. Commentators in Nigerian media have described Adedayo's work as a significant visual record of the country's cultural heritage and tourism assets. His photography projects have focused on documenting communities, traditions and landscapes across Nigeria.

== Publications ==
Dayo Adedayo is the author of many books including:

- Nigeria (2010) inc. Foreword by Professor Ahmed Yerima
- Nigeria The Magical: A Photographic Journey (2014)
- Òwe Yorùbá (Yoruba Proverbs) (2014)
- Òwe Yorùbá 2.0 (Yoruba Proverbs)(2014) inc. Foreword by Báṣọ̀run Délé Mọ́mọ́dù
- Nigeria 2.0 (2015) inc. Foreword by Bisi Onasanya
- Rivers State - Our Proud Heritage
- Enchanting Nigeria
- Tour Nigeria(2018)
- Lagos State - The Centre of Excellence (2019) inc. Foreword by Atunyota Alleluya Akpobome
- Ogun State - The Gateway State (2020) inc. Foreword by Otunba Bimbola Ashiru
- Window Seat (2024) inc. Foreword by Olubunmi Kuku
- Nigerian Tourism Development Corporation - Tourism is Life
- Nigerian National Petroleum Corporation 37 Years in Pictures
- Nigeria - A Timeless Beauty(2025)
- Nigeria - A Visual Portrait (2026) inc. Foreword by Bola Ahmed Adekunle Tinubu
