= Robert Houston (photographer) =

American photographer (1935–2021)

- Born: December 13, 1935; Baltimore
- Died: April 26, 2021 (aged 85)
- Known for: Photography

Robert Houston (November 13, 1935 – April 26, 2021) was an American photographer born in East Baltimore. He documented the civil rights movement in the U.S., including Martin Luther King Jr.'s Poor People's Campaign and Resurrection City in Washington, D.C.

Days after Martin Luther King Jr. was assassinated in 1968, Houston left his job to become a full-time documentary photographer. Hoping to capture social movements and to contribute social commentary through his photographs, he showed his work to publishers and agencies in New York. After meeting the photographer Gordon Parks, he was hired by the Black Star photography agency. Beginning in May 1968, he worked as a photojournalist for Life magazine, where he was assigned to photograph the Poor People's Campaign in Washington, D.C. During the Campaign, Resurrection City was constructed as a tented community that held nearly 3,000 residents on the National Mall. Houston lived in and photographed residents of Resurrection City for more than a month. He left before the full 43 days because of the birth of his third child.

Due to the news of the assassinations of Martin Luther King Jr. and Robert F. Kennedy, many of Houston's photographs of the Poor People's Campaign for Life were never published.

Houston's work has been shown at the Smithsonian National Museum of African American History and Culture in the exhibition “City of Hope: Resurrection City & the 1968 Poor People’s Campaign.” The Museum holds his photographs of Resurrection City in their collection, as well as a journal he kept.

Houston died on April 26, 2021, at the age of 85.

Houston's work was included in the 2025 exhibition Photography and the Black Arts Movement, 1955–1985 at the National Gallery of Art.

== See also ==
- List of photographers of the civil rights movement
