= Robert Fletcher (photographer) =

American photographer, filmmaker, writer, and educator - born 1938

- Born: 1938 (age 87–88); Detroit, Michigan
- Known for: Photography

Robert Fletcher (born 1938) is an American photographer, filmmaker, writer, and educator. He is known for his photographs of the activities of the Student Nonviolent Coordinating Committee (SNCC).

Fletcher was born in Detroit, Michigan in 1938. He attended Fisk University and Wayne State University. In 1964 he became the photographer for SNCC.

Fletcher's work has been included in major Black photojournalism exhibits including the 1980 Smithsonian exhibition We'll Never Turn Back, and the traveling exhibition This Light of Ours: Activist Photographers of the Civil Rights Movement.

Fletcher's work was included in the 2025 exhibition Photography and the Black Arts Movement, 1955–1985 at the National Gallery of Art.
