= Dudley M. Brooks =

American photographer and photo-editor

- Born: December 26, 1957 (age 68); Baltimore, Maryland
- Occupation: Photographer

Dudley M. Brooks is the co-creator of Songs of My People African Americans: A Self-Portrait, a historic photo documentary of the world of African Americans, and he is currently the deputy director of photography for The Washington Post and photo editor for The Washington Post Magazine.

== Biography ==
Brooks was born on December 26, 1957, in Baltimore, Maryland. He attended Morgan State University in Baltimore and graduated in 1980 with a Bachelor of Fine Arts degree.

== Career ==
Brooks started working for The Washington Post in 1983. He left in 2005 to become the Assistant Managing Editor for Photography at The Baltimore Sun. In 2007, he became the Photo Director for Jet (magazine) and Ebony (magazine). While working at Ebony, he had the opportunity to photograph Michael Jackson in 2007 and make a tribute for him on the cover of the magazine. He also directed and was the photographer for the first photo shoot with Barack Obama as the newly elected president of the United States. Brooks returned to work at the Washington Post in 2014. Another part of his career was becoming the co-director for Songs of My People.

== Awards ==
Brooks won multiple World Press Photo awards. He won third prize in the sports stories category in 1998 with images that showed the Silver Gloves boxing competition in Lennea, Kansas. In 1999 he won third prize in the general news stories category with images that revealed the damage in Nicaragua from Hurricane Mitch. The judges liked that it brought awareness. He won third prize in the general news singles category in 2001 with images of the mass suicide of The Movement for the Restoration of the Ten Commandments - a church that murdered hundreds of its cult members after falsely predicting the end of the world in the year 2000.

== Books and exhibitions ==
Addis Foto Fest in Addis Ababa, hosted a gallery of Brook's photos of the Haiti earthquake and its effects in 2010. Also, with Eric Easter and D. Michael Cheers, he co-directed "Songs of my People" which was a photo project that eventually toured as an exhibition and was made into a book, (ISBN 0316109819) published in 1992. In 1990, 53 photographers from around the country were assigned to cover various aspects of black American life. The resulting photographs were edited down to 214 pictures in the book and 150 in the show. According to the NY Times review, "Songs of my People" was exhibited at the Museum of the City of New York and the images are notable because they display everyday life in African-American culture instead of the urban problems often seen in mass media.
