= P. H. Polk =

American photographer (1898–1984)

Prentice Herman Polk Sr. (November 25, 1898 – December 29, 1984) was an American photographer known for his portraits of African Americans. He also served for several years as head of the Tuskegee Institute's Department of Photography.

== Biography ==
Prentice Herman Polk was born on November 25, 1898, in Bessemer, Alabama, one of four children of Jacob Prentice Polk and Christine Romelia Ward. Originally named Herman Polk, he adopted his father's given name after his death and was known as P. H.

In 1916, he enrolled at the Tuskegee Institute intending to become a painter. His plans changed when he heard photographer C. M. Battey—who headed Tuskegee's Photography Department from 1916 to 1927—talk about the potential of that field and encourage interested students to come see him. After speaking with Battey, Polk went on to study photography with him by correspondence. In 1924, Polk moved to Chicago, Illinois, where he furthered his studies with a white photographer, Fred A. Jensen.

=== Photography career ===
Polk returned to Tuskegee in 1927 to open his own studio in his home in the town. His mentor Battey died that same year, and the following year Polk joined the school's faculty. In 1933, he took over as head of the Photography Department, remaining in that capacity until 1938. He left for a year in an attempt to open a branch of his photography studio in Atlanta, GA, before returning to Tuskegee to serve as the college's official photographer for four decades. He documented famous visitors such as Paul Robeson and Langston Hughes and events such as the Civil Rights Movement on campus. At the same time, he continued to run his own studio in town.

Shot in black and white, Polk's subjects ranged from famous African Americans such as George Washington Carver to working-class and poor Alabamians. One series, "Old Characters", focused on documenting formerly enslaved men and women from Macon County. Like Battey, Polk strove to portray his sitters with dignity and sensitivity. Unlike Battey—who preferred soft-focus shots and idealizing poses—Polk developed a style in which sharp details and strong lighting showcased his subjects' individuality. His approach is evident in a comment he made about a 1932 photograph from the "Old Characters" series entitled The Boss:

"Portrayed in her own matter-of-factness: confident, hard working, adventuresome, assertive and stern. The pose, at an angle, and her expression, authoritative and firm, are not the result of my usual tactics to encourage a response. She wears her own clothes. She is not cloaked in victimization. She is not pitiful; therefore, she is not portrayed in pitiful surroundings. She is not helpless, and she is not cute."

In his early work, Polk used a Kodak box camera with a Graphex lens. Critics have commented on his technical mastery of the medium despite not always having the best equipment.

One of Polk's most influential images was a 1941 photograph of First Lady Eleanor Roosevelt in a plane with pilot Charles Anderson, who was the Tuskegee Institute's chief flight instructor. The photograph was used to promote the newly established Tuskegee Airmen "experiment" that would ultimately train some 450 black pilots for deployment in World War II as the Tuskegee Airmen.

Polk's photographs have been exhibited at the Corcoran Gallery (Washington, D.C.), the Museum of Natural History (New York), the Studio Museum in Harlem, and a range of galleries and other institutions. In 1980 he was awarded the Black Photographer’s Annual Testimonial Award, and the following year he won a National Endowment for the Arts fellowship.

Polk retired from Tuskegee in the early 1980s and died in Tallassee, Alabama, on December 29, 1984.

== Personal life ==
Polk married Margaret Blanche Thompson in Chicago in 1926; the couple had nine children, including Prentice Polk Jr., who was briefly a seminarian for the Josephites, and Reginalda Polk, a member of the Dominican Sisters of Sinsinawa.

== Publications on Polk's work ==
- Polk, P.H. P.H. Polk—A Portfolio of Eleven Original Photographs. South Light/Ohio State University, 1981. (Signed limited edition)
- Polk, P.H. P.H. Polk. Corcoran Gallery catalog, 1981.
- Chapp, Belena S., et al. P.H. Polk: Through These Eyes: The Photographs of P.H. Polk. University Gallery, 1998.
