= Mikki Ferrill =

American photographer b. 1937

- Born: 1937 (age 88–89); Chicago, Illinois
- Known for: Photography

Valeria “Mikki” Ferrill (born 1937) is an American photographer.

Ferrill was born in Chicago, Illinois in 1937. She attended the School of the Art Institute of Chicago.

In 1986 her work was included in the exhibition Two Schools: New York and Chicago Contemporary African-American Photography of the 60s and 70s at the Kenkeleba Gallery as well as the exhibition On Freedom: The Art of Photojournalism at the Studio Museum in Harlem. Ferrill's work was part of the 2024 exhibition Transformations: American Photographs From the 1970s at the Philadelphia Museum of Art. In the 2025 her work was included in the exhibition Photography and the Black Arts Movement, 1955–1985 at the National Gallery of Art.

Fanner's photographs are in the collection of the Art Institute of Chicago, The National Gallery of Art, and the Philadelphia Museum of Art.
