= Frank Dandridge =

American photographer

- Born: 1938 (age 87–88)
- Known for: Photography

Frank Dandridge (born 1938) is a photojournalist and television writer. He is best known for his photographs of the civil rights movement. Many of his photographs appeared in Life magazine.

In 2017 Time magazine ran an essay discussing Dandridge's coverage of the 1967 Newark riots.

Dandridge's work was included in the 2025 exhibition Photography and the Black Arts Movement, 1955–1985 at the National Gallery of Art. His portrait of James Baldwin is in the archives of the National Museum of African American History and Culture. His iconic image Birmingham Bombing Victim Sarah Jean Collins, 1963 is in the Princeton University Art Museum.
