= Larry Cook (artist) =

Larry Cook is a Washington, D.C.–based conceptual, video, and photo artist. Cook's work often explored Black identity, race relations, and community.

== Education ==
Cook received a B.A. degree from State University of New York at Plattsburgh in 2010. He then attended George Washington University, receiving a M.F.A. degree in 2013.

== Career ==
He has taught art in a Maryland High School and has served as an adjunct professor at multiple D.C. universities. He is currently Assistant Professor of Art at Howard University.

Cook is the 2017 winner of the Best of Show honor in the Trawick Prize: Bethesda Contemporary Art Awards.
