= Ryan N. Dennis =

American curator and writer

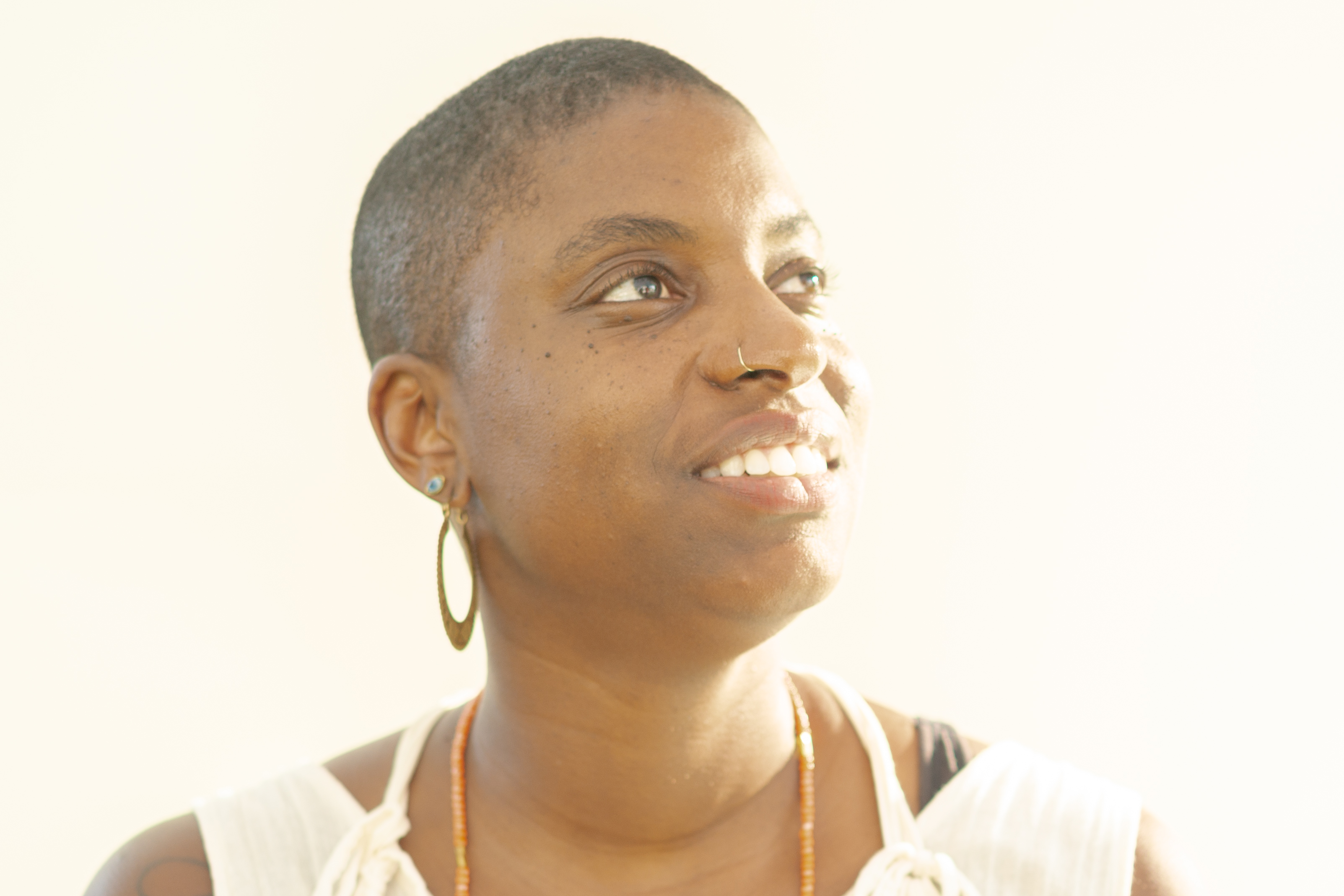
- Curator Ryan N. Dennis at Black Lunch Table + Project Row Houses Juneteenth Photobooth, 2021.
- Born: Houston, Texas
- Education: University of Houston; Pratt Institute
- Known for: Artistic director and chief curator
- Notable work: Mississippi Museum of Art Center for Art and Public Exchange (CAPE); Project Row Houses
- Awards: 2019 Center for Curatorial Leadership Fellowship
- Elected: 2019 Whitney Museum of American Art Bucksbaum Award Juror; 2021 Texas Biennial Co-Curator
- Website: https://www.ryanndennis.com/

Ryan N. Dennis is an American curator and writer who currently serves as Co-Director and Chief Curator at the Contemporary Art Museum Houston (CAMH). She was appointed in June 2023 after serving as Chief Curator and Artistic Director at the Mississippi Museum of Art's Center for Art and Public Exchange (CAPE). She previously served as Curator and Programs Director (2017-2020) and Public Art Director and Curator (2012-2017) at Project Row Houses in Houston, Texas. Dennis focuses on African American contemporary art with an emphasis on site-specific projects and community engagement.

== Early life and education ==
Ryan N. Dennis was born in Houston, Texas. In 2007, she received a Bachelor of Arts degree from the University of Houston where she was in the African American studies program and the art history program. She received a M.A. degree in arts and cultural management from the Pratt Institute in New York City in 2011. Dennis interned in the curatorial department of the Menil Collection in Houston, where she would later work professionally.

== Professional career ==
Early in her career, Ryan N. Dennis worked as a curatorial assistant at the Menil Collection (2007-2009). She moved to New York City to pursue her degree, where she was a fellow at The Laundromat Project in 2009, worked in public programs at the New Museum, and was traveling exhibition and artists-in-residence manager at the Museum for African Art (now The Africa Center) from 2010 to 2012.

Dennis joined Project Row Houses in 2012 as Public Art Director and Curator. In 2017, she was promoted to Curator and Programs Director. During her tenure at Project Row Houses, she organized and co-organized ten rounds of exhibitions, including Round 41: Process and Action: An Exploration of Labor (2015), Round 43: Small Business/ Big Change: Economic Perspectives from Artists and Artrepreneurs (2015), Round 44: Shattering the Concrete: Artists, Activists, and Instigators (2016), Round 45: Local Impact (2016), Round 46: Black Women Artists for Black Lives Matter at Project Row Houses (2017), Round 47:The Act of Doing: Preserving, Revitalizing and Protecting Third Ward (2018), Round 48: Beyond Social Practice (2019), Round 49: penumbras: sacred geometries (2019), and Round 50: Race, Health and Motherhood (2019). Artists who have participated in these rounds include Simone Leigh, Tatyana Fazlalizadeh, Autumn Knight, Lovie Olivia, Ayanna Jolivet McCloud, Kameelah Janan Rasheed, Martine Syms, Erika DeFreitas, Michelle Barnes, Robert Pruitt, and Regina Agu.

Dennis was selected for the 2019 Center for Curatorial Leadership annual Fellowship, where she completed a weeklong residency at the Brooklyn Museum. In 2019, she was selected, along with Evan Garza, to co-curate the seventh edition (2021) of the Texas Biennial, a "geographically-led, independent survey of contemporary art in Texas." She was a juror for the 2019 Whitney Museum of American Art Bucksbaum Award, which every two years awards $100,000 and is one of the largest cash awards for individual visual artists.

In April 2020, she became the Chief Curator and Artistic Director at the Mississippi Museum of Art's Center for Art and Public Exchange (CAPE). It is the largest art museum in the state.

Ryan N. Dennis' written works appear in Prospect.3 Notes for Now (2014) as part of Prospect New Orleans, Gulf Coast: A Journal of Literature and Fine Arts (2015), the Miami Rail (2017). She also contributed to the monograph of Autumn Knight published in 2018.

== Other activities ==
- Whitney Museum of American Art Bucksbaum Award, juror (2019)
- The Kenneth Rainin Foundation Open Spaces Program grants, member of the jury (2019)
- Houston Artadia Awards, member of the jury (2017)
