= Jesse Lott =

American artist (1943–2023)

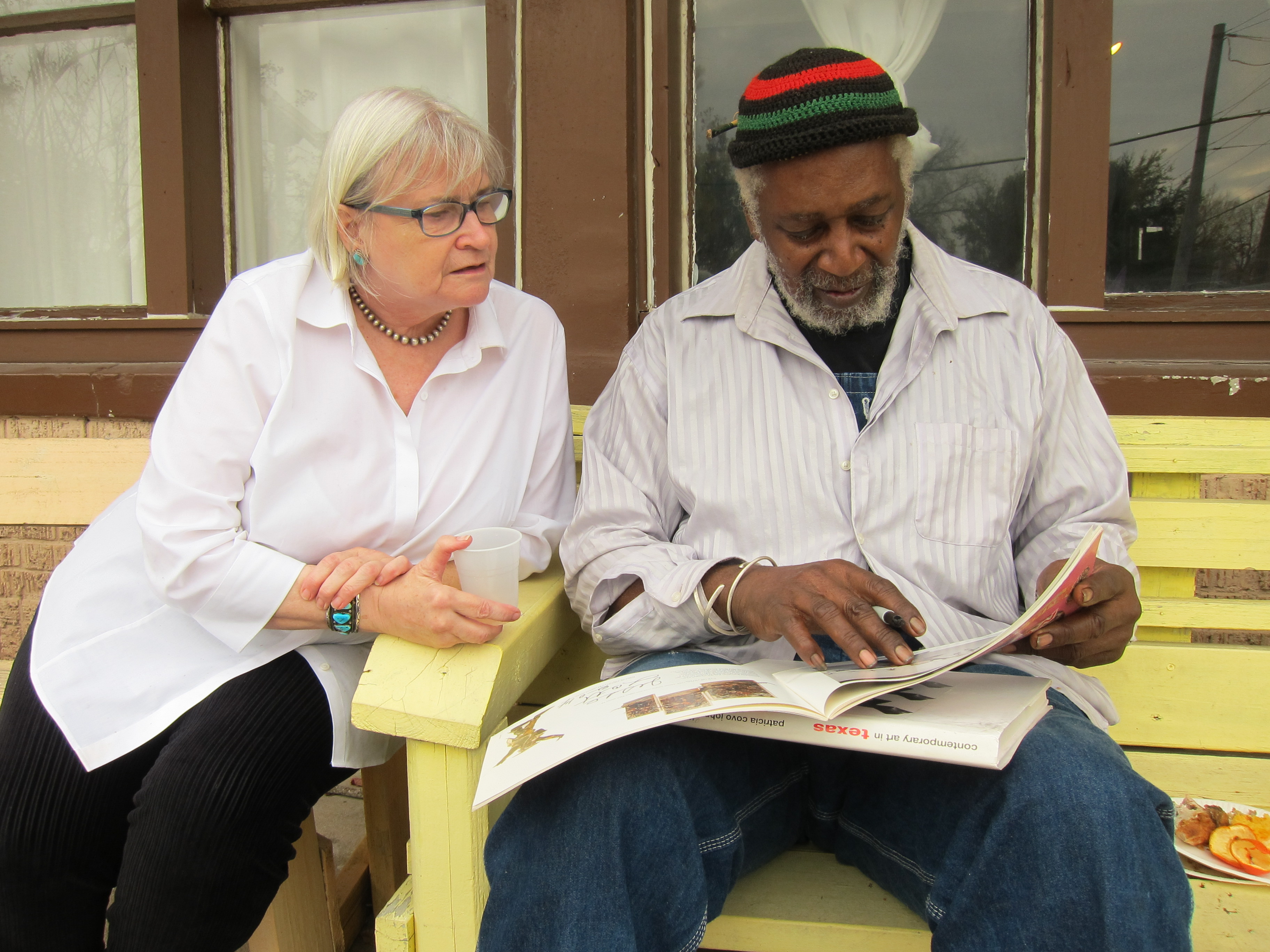
- Lott (right) with Linda Shearer (left) in 2014
- Born: 1943; Simmesport, Louisiana, U.S.
- Died: July 24, 2023 (aged 80); Houston, Texas, U.S.
- Education: Hampton Institute; California State University; Otis Art Institute
- Known for: Sculpture; Collage; Drawing
- Movement: Black Arts Movement; Urban Frontier Art

Jesse Lott (1943 – July 24, 2023) was an American visual artist known for his wire and wood sculptures, papier mâché figures, and collages made from found materials within a style he called "urban frontier art".

== Early life and education ==
Jesse Lott was born in Simmesport, Louisiana, in 1943. He was African American. During the 1950s, his family relocated to Texas, eventually settling in Houston's Fifth Ward. He attended E.O. Smith Elementary School and Kashmere Gardens High School. In 1957, at the age of 14, he sold his first artwork, a painting. Lott said that this event marked the beginning of his professional art career.

At the time, people of color were only allowed to visit Houston's Fine Arts Museum on one specified day each week. Galleries, too, generally prohibited viewings. The exhibition of black artists' work was virtually unheard of.

Muralist John Biggers was an early mentor. Biggers was founding chairman of the art department at Texas Southern University (formerly Texas State University for Negroes). Following a trip to Africa, he visited area high schools, including Lott's, and expounded on art, specifically the role of the black artist. Biggers taught that African American artists should turn to the motherland rather than Europe for inspirational models.

On Biggers recommendation, Lott enrolled in the historically black college Hampton Institute. He studied there during 1963 and 1964. From Virginia, he moved across the country to California State University (1965) and then Otis Art Institute in Los Angeles. During his time at Otis, 1967 to 1969, social realist Charles White was his drawing teacher and personal advisor. Lott fell in with the Black Arts Movement, a group of conceptual artists and collagists which included White, David Hammons, and Joe Overstreet.

While Lott was skilled at painting and drawing, he soon discovered his true gift, turning trash to treasure and combining it with the spirit of activism. In Collision: The Contemporary Art Scene in Houston, 1972–1985, author Pete Gershon writes, "Very much in line with the Black Arts Movement, Lott's work involved a kind of community-building social practice. It was common for him to hire a pack of loitering kids to dismantle a castoff bedspring and sort out its components. As Lott says, 'There's one kid that didn't become a juvenile delinquent that day...'"

== Career ==
In 1974, Lott returned to the Fifth Ward. In the summer of 1977, Robinson Galleries held a major exhibition of his work, Relics of the Future, the first large solo show for Lott. It included 40 works, including 14 sculptures, 5 paintings, and a 30-minute video tape by Andy Mann that documented the original installation and opening. The gallery also produced a 19-page catalog that accompanied the exhibit. Robinson Galleries presented Relics of the Future, Part Two the following year.

In 1979, Lott's 9-foot, 200-pound figurative wire and rebar sculpture Zoroastera: Fire Spitter was included in Fire, a show of 100 Texas artists curated by James Surls for Contemporary Arts Museum Houston. At Surls' invitation Art in America editor Lucy Lippard covered the exhibit for the international magazine. Her review was measured, but would be instrumental in bringing nationwide attention to Texas artists.

Dozens of solo exhibits and group shows, often surveys of African American artists, would follow. While some black artists bristle at being labeled, Lott saw it as an opportunity to recognize a racially divided country. Large touring exhibits that focused on black artists and featured Lott include Next Generation: Southern Black Aesthetics (1990–1992) and Stop Asking, We Exist: 25 African American Crafts Artists (1998–2000). A solo exhibit Jesse Lott: Urban Frontier Artist visited the Museum of Contemporary Art in Washington D.C. and the Art Car Museum in Houston. His work has also been shown at The Studio Museum in Harlem and The Alternative Museum (now closed) in Lower Manhattan.

On the role of the artist, Lott stated, "Artists are entrusted with a metaphysical vision. It is said that a picture is worth a thousand words. That means that many words have been entrusted to those to whom God has given the ability to create. When a pebble hits a pool, it starts a wave that covers the whole pool. The pebble is the concept. An artist puts out a concept and the concept changes the consciousness of the viewer, leading to a positive change in the pattern of his activity."

In addition to his visionary artwork, Lott's shaman-like presence in Houston's art community had widespread impact. Many Texas artists including Rick Lowe, James Surls, Bert Long Jr., Robert Pruitt, Angelbert Metoyer, and Robert Hodge name Lott as an important influence. In the catalog for Jesse Lott: Urban Frontier Artist (1999), longtime friend and supporter Jim Harithas wrote, "He is respected for the integrity and mojo power of his art and greatly admired for his many private acts of compassion to the homeless, to poverty-stricken seniors, to the young and to artists throughout the community. His all-ages workshops held over the years in his studio as a community service inspired many students who would otherwise have no exposure to art." Lott was also involved in other "significant community activities including Adept, the first museum devoted to African American culture in Houston [now closed], The Midtown Art Center, the Ann Robinson Gallery, and the Art Car Museum. Lott's community oriented philosophy and his Artists in Action program helped spark the creation of the now famous Project Row Houses."

== Urban frontier art ==
In the catalog for his first exhibit at Robinson Galleries, Lott outlined the tenets of his art making process, which he referred to at the time as "urban folk art".

"The concept of urban folk art is based on four universal principles which are to me:

- 1. the law of existence: all things that exist are the best possible evidence of themselves
- 2. the law of opposition: all things that exist, exist in terms of their opposite
- 3. the principle of activity: the end result of all processes is simply activity and the awareness of that activity
- 4. the principle of order: the basic order existing in the universe (biological, geometric, cosmic, etc.)

When these principles are added to the urban artist's approach, the result is a sculptural technique which is directly related to their environment. The sculptural technique, represented here, is a combination of the natural resources of the urban community along with the skill of a trained artist and the attitude of the primitive."

=== Found materials ===
A distinctive feature of the Lott's work is the use of found materials. He realized early on that the cost of art materials was prohibitive, not only for him, but also for all artists of limited means. At the same time, he saw that in a commodity-driven culture, a wealth of materials, in the form of discards, is available to any artist for the taking. Lott employed these urban castoffs: wire, broken glass, tree roots and branches, scraps of costume jewelry, furniture legs, metal bed frames and springs, and discarded paper in his sculptural work.

"It's political," Lott said about this artmaking process, "Transforming trash into a classical figure is a political action. Rich people don't have time to go through the garbage - their job is to make the garbage. But when a mother of two has to buy cereal boxes for her kids, and she transforms those cereal boxes into paper dolls and sells them, she is entering a different economic system. Art is political when you use it to solve economic problems."

=== El Piñatero Method ===
Another low cost technique Lott used for sculpting is known as El Piñatero Method because of its similarity to piñata making as layers of papier mâché are applied over frameworks (sometimes combined with discarded, reclaimed objects) to create human, animal, and other forms. Instead of wire armatures, he began with a paper or cardboard cone for the primary structure. Additional cones were employed by Lott to form the limbs, then more paper of all types and colors were layered on top to build the figures, which range from 3 inches to 10 feet tall.

== Project Row Houses ==
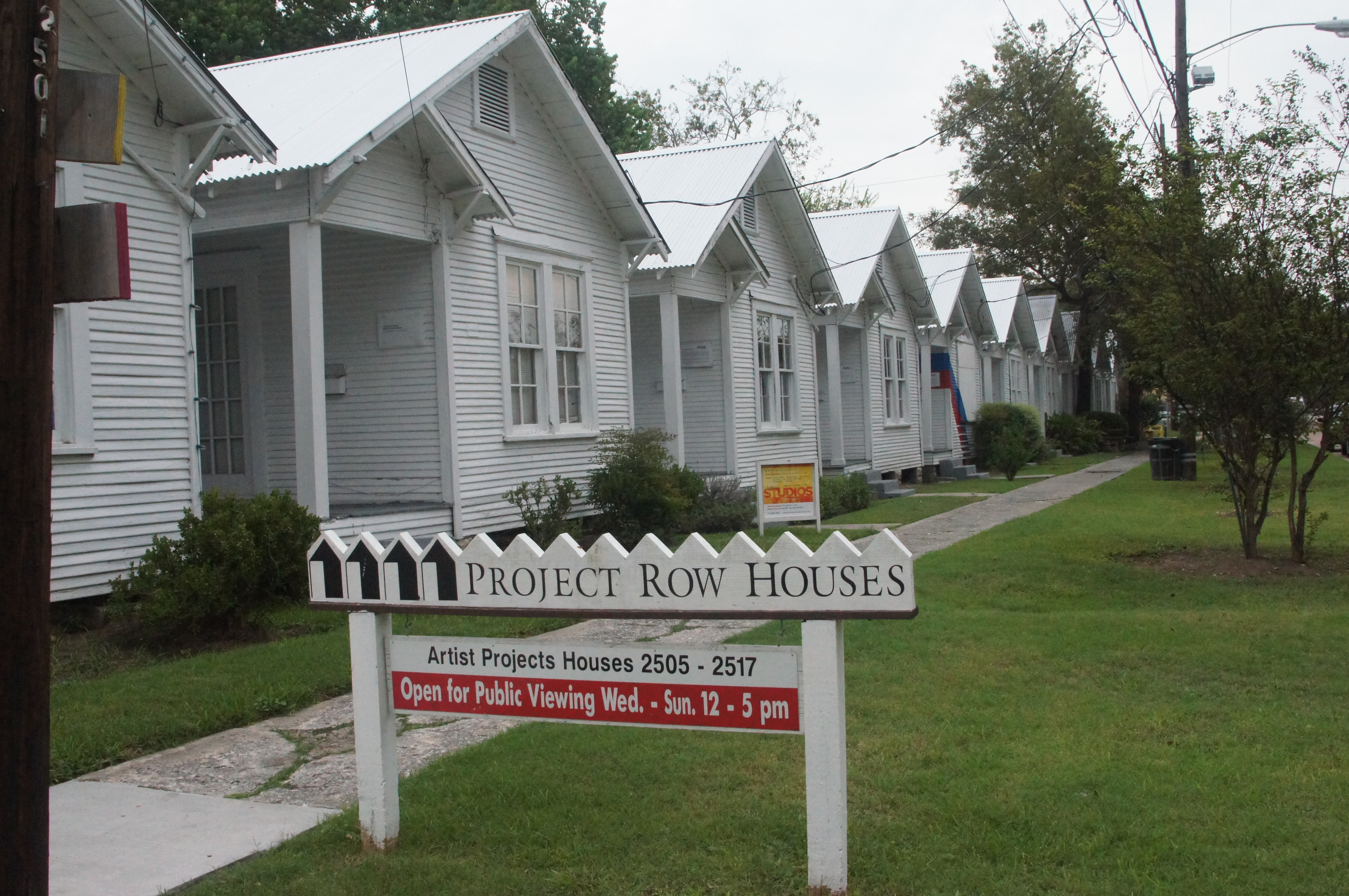
Project Row Houses studios

Lott was pivotal in the founding of Project Row Houses (PRH), a landmark urban reclamation project located in Houston's Third Ward. In 1993, a coalition of black artists led by Rick Lowe and including James Bettison, Bert Long Jr., Floyd Newsum, Bert Samples, and George Smith raised the funds to purchase 22 derelict shotgun houses built in the 1930s. Seven of the buildings were transformed into a center for contemporary African American art that hosts changing exhibitions and performances. Five of the houses are used as residences for single mothers and their children. One serves as PRH's office and as a community gathering place.

The project's five pillars of social art practice are: art and creativity, education, social safety net, good and relevant architecture, and economic sustainability. An exhibit on Project Row Houses is on permanent display at the Smithsonian's National Museum of African American History and Culture.

== Art League Houston Lifetime Achievement Award ==
In 2016, Art League Houston named Lott the recipient of the Lifetime Achievement Award in Visual Arts.

The accompanying exhibition featured a detailed survey of more than 30 pieces: sculpture, drawing, and collage, highlighting the three key materials in Lott's work: paper, wire, and wood. The work was drawn from art historical, political, and personal perspectives, and evidenced Lott's profound engagement with the creative process and his commitment to the value of lifelong learning and community building. The show also referenced Lott's significant influence as both a teacher and mentor by including work by longtime students and co-collaborators of his.

While the Art League show ran, Lott also had work up at three other venues: Friendly Fire at the Station Museum of Contemporary Art, From Space To Field at the SITE Gallery, and at another location as part of Houston Sculpture Month.

== Jesse Lott: Art and Activism ==
Lott is the subject of a 28-minute documentary Jesse Lott: Art & Activism released in 2017. The short was shot by students from the 14 Pews Film Academy and directed and edited by 14 Pews founder Cressandra Thibodeaux. The video won numerous national awards, including Best Short Documentary in both the International Black Film Festival and the Tulsa American Film Festival.

The piece follows Lott from an unexpected hospital stay, through his preparation for the 2016 Art League exhibit to the show's opening at which he received the lifetime achievement award from longtime friend, artist Mel Chin. Houston art community notables that sat for interviews for the film include Rick Lowe, Jim and Ann Harithas, Allison Greene, Dan Allison, and Pete Gershon. The documentary also contains previously unseen archival footage shot by the late video artist Andy Mann.

== Selected solo exhibits ==
Lott's solos shows include:

- 2016, Jesse Lott: Artist in Action, Art League Houston, Houston Texas
- 2004, Jesse Lott Retrospective, New Braunfels Museum of Art & Music, New Braunfels, Texas
- 1999, Jesse Lott: Urban Frontier Artist, Art Car Museum, Houston, Texas
- 1998, Jesse Lott: Urban Frontier Artist, Museum of Contemporary Art, Washington D.C.
- 1997, Hello Again, Oakland Museum of Art, Oakland, California
- 1995, Project Row Houses, Houston, Texas
- 1991, Lone Star Visions: Jesse Lott, Art Museum of Southwest Texas, Beaumont, Texas
- 1991, Relics of the Future, Part Four: Evolution of Imagery, Midtown Art Center, Houston, Texas
- 1989, Jesse Lott: The Pinatero Method, Lawndale Art and Performance Center, Houston, Texas
- 1987, Jesse Lott, Hiram Butler Gallery, Houston, Texas
- 1982, Tower of Light, Houston Festival, Houston, Texas
- 1978, Relics of the Future, Part Two, Robinson Galleries, Houston, Texas
- 1977, Relics of the Future, Part One, Robinson Galleries, Houston, Texas

== Notable group shows ==
Group shows of note include:

- 2018, Identifiably Houston – Foundations III, Deborah Colton Gallery, Houston, Texas
- 2017, Focus on the 70s and 80s: Houston Foundations Part II, Deborah Colton Gallery, Houston, Texas
- 2016, Friendly Fire, Station Museum of Contemporary Art, Houston, Texas
- 2008, Houston Collects: African American Art, Museum of Fine Arts, Houston, Houston Texas
- 2007, Amistad: Texas Art in Peru, Museo de la Nación, Lima, Peru
- 1999, Ex Patria, Art Car Museum, Houston, Texas
- 1998–2000, Stop Asking, We Exist: 25 African American Crafts Artists, The Society of Contemporary Crafts, Pittsburgh, Pennsylvania; also visited American Craft Museum, New York, New York; New Bedford Museum of Art, New Bedford, Massachusetts; Mobile Museum of Art, Mobile, Alabama
- 1992, Re-Creation (Art From Found Objects), Laguna Gloria Arts Museum, Austin, Texas
- 1991–1992, The Perfect World in Contemporary Texas Art, San Antonio, Texas
- 1991, Black Creativity in Texas, The Lubbock Fine Arts Center and the Lubbock Black Cultural and Heritage Center, Lubbock, Texas
- 1990–1992, Next Generation: Southern Black Aesthetics, Southeastern Center for Contemporary Art, Winston-Salem, North Carolina, also visited Samuel P. Harn Museum of Art, University of Florida, Gainesville, Florida; Hunter Museum of Art, Chattanooga, Tennessee; Contemporary Arts Center, New Orleans, Louisiana; Orlando Museum of Art, Orlando, Florida
- 1990, Day of the Dead, Lawndale Art and Performance Center, Houston, Texas
- 1988, Texas Artists, Staten Island Art Center, New York, New York
- 1987, The First Texas Triennial, Contemporary Arts Museum, Houston, Texas
- 1986, Emerging Artists of the Southwest, Studio Museum, New York, New York
- 1984, Collision, Lawndale Art and Performance Center, Houston, Texas
- 1982, Showdown, Alternative Museum, New York, New York
- 1981, Gun Show, Pomona Fairgrounds, Pomona, California
- 1979, Fire, Contemporary Arts Museum, Houston, Texas
- 1978, Houston/Philadelphia Exchange, Institute of Contemporary Art, Philadelphia, Pennsylvania

== Permanent public art ==
Lott's work is featured in several public spaces around the City of Houston.

In 2013, he was one of twenty-two artists commissioned to create sculpture for METRORail's Arts in Transit program. Constructed from stainless steel and mixed metals, Lott's piece depicts a figure with its arms in the air. It was originally titled The Spirit of Transportation, but was renamed Hands Up, Don't Shoot! by the community. It is installed on METRORail's Purple Line at Scott St. and Elgin St. in the Third Ward.

The same year, he was invited to participate in the Texan-French Alliance for the Arts citywide "Open-The-Door" public art project, for which he created a tribute painting to Houston artist Bert Long.

In 2010, he was commissioned by Hermann Park to make a public art piece for Lake Plaza where he integrated art objects and materials found around the city into the plaza's walkways.

== Personal life and death ==
Lott was famously private about his personal life. He was known to have at least two children. Son Vida assisted the artist in his Fifth Ward studio/home.

Jesse Lott died in Houston, Texas, in July 2023, at the age of 80.
