= Floyd Newsum =

American artist (1950–2024)

Floyd Newsum Jr.
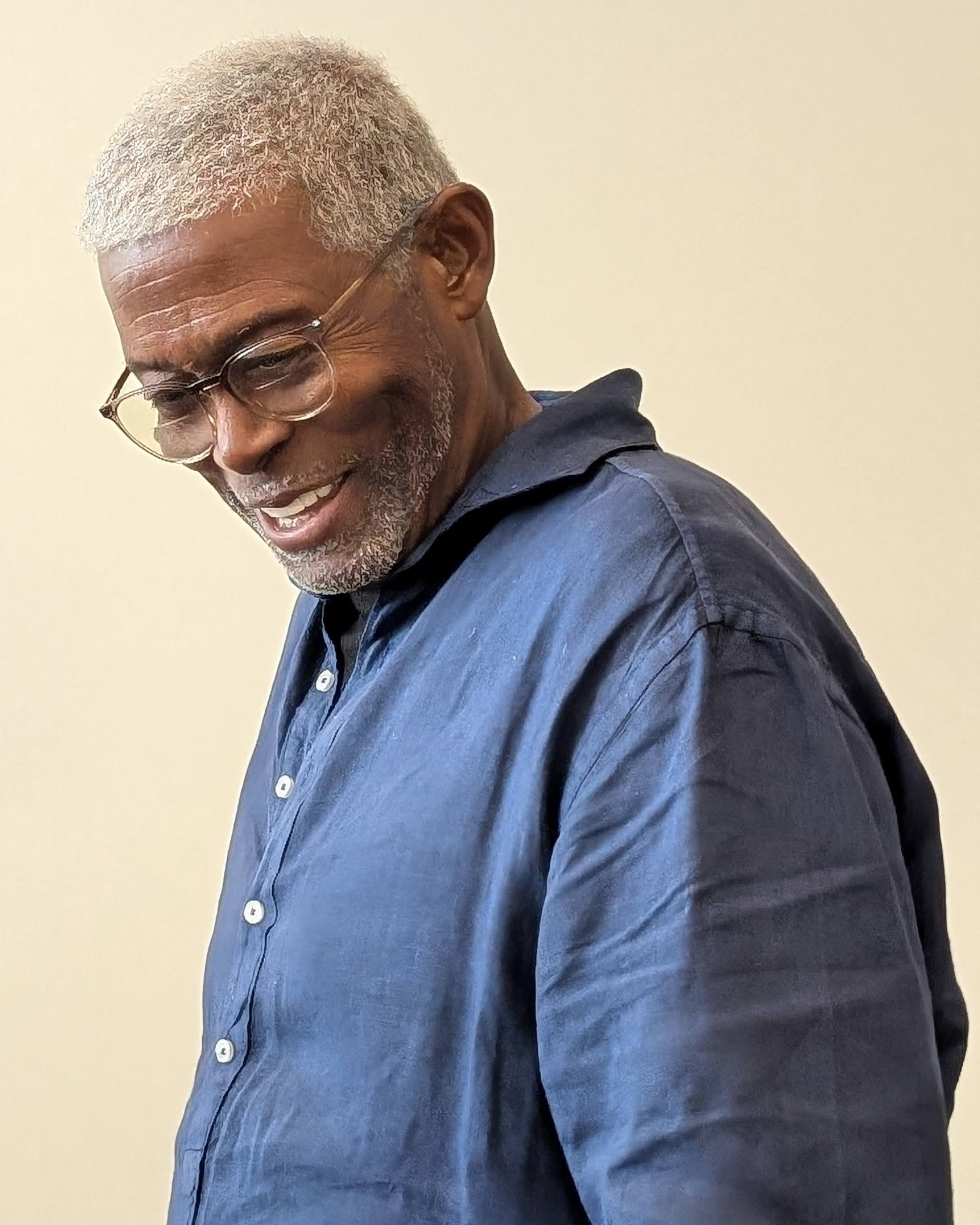
- Newsum in June 2024
- Born: Floyd Elbert Newsum, Jr. November 3, 1950; Memphis, Tennessee
- Died: August 14, 2024 (aged 73); Houston, Texas
- Education: Memphis College of Art; Temple University
- Known for: Painting; Sculpture
- Movement: Black Arts Movement

Floyd Elbert Newsum Jr. (November 3, 1950 – August 14, 2024) was an American artist, educator and co-founder of Project Row Houses, a development merging art, cultural identity and community action in Houston, Texas' Third Ward.

As an artist he was best known for his large, colorful, childlike paintings filled with personal iconography and West African motifs. Two of his pieces are in the collection of the Smithsonian National Museum of African American History and Culture. He is also noted for several large public sculptures in Houston and Ft. Worth, Texas.

== Early life and education ==
The oldest of three siblings, Floyd Elbert Newsum Jr. was born in Memphis, Tennessee, to Floyd Elbert Newsum Sr. and Evelyn Forestine LaMondue Newsum. Newsum Sr. was the first black firefighter in the city. Both parents were involved in Memphis' Civil Rights Movement. As a teen, Newsum Jr. learned about the Memphis sanitation strike and assassination of Martin Luther King Jr. Like Floyd, Newsum's younger brother H. Ike Okafor-Newsum became a painter, sculptor and professor.

Newsum attended then-segregated Hamilton High School. He practiced martial arts and played briefly on the football team. After graduation, he was accepted to Lincoln University in Jefferson City, Missouri. But, instead of enrolling there, he decided to follow his love for art and register at Memphis College of Art (formerly Memphis Academy of Arts). He initially majored in graphic arts, but switched to studio arts. During his time in school, Newsum was influenced by the Black Arts Movement, an art and activism movement focused on Black pride.

Through his college studio-mate, Newsum met his future wife, Janice Moore. They were married on Christmas Eve, 1972. He received his Bachelor of Fine Arts degree the following year. The newlyweds then moved to Philadelphia so Newsum could pursue a Master of Fine Arts degree from the Tyler School of Art at Temple University.

Throughout his graduate and undergraduate years, Newsum fought against racial oppression and discrimination. During his time at Temple, he was part of an effort to establish a chapter of the Black Panther Party, thereby attracting the attention of the FBI. He received a master's degree in 1975. In 1976, the Newsums welcomed their first child, a son. (Their second child, a daughter, was born in 1984.)

To support his growing family, Newsum worked as a retail salesperson, postal employee and community college instructor. While attending a College Art Association conference, he was offered an assistant professorship at the University of Houston–Downtown (UHD). He would remain at UHD for nearly 50 years.

== Career ==
Newsum's work has been featured in more than 100 solo and group exhibitions, including shows at the Philadelphia Museum of Arts, Pennsylvania; the Taft Museum, Cincinnati, Ohio; the Contemporary Arts Center, New Orleans, Louisiana, the Studio Museum in Harlem, New York City|New York; the Contemporary Arts Museum Houston, Texas; the Polk Museum, Lakeland, Florida; the David C. Driskell Center, University of Maryland, College Park, Maryland; the Museum of Fine Arts Houston and other venues across the U.S. He exhibited internationally at the Califia Gallery, Horazdovice, Czech Republic; and the American Center in St. Petersburg, Russia.

The Smithsonian National Museum of African American History and Culture has two of Newsum's paintings in its permanent collection. One of them, After the Storm CNN (2008), depicts a landscape of scattered objects on a background of deep blue. The piece refers to news coverage of Hurricane Katrina and the racial disparity associated with the event. It was acquired in 2013 and was on display at the 2016 opening of the museum. The second painting, Ghost Series Sirigu, Janie's Apron, a piece inspired by his grandmother, was acquired in 2012.

The first large-scale retrospective of his work was held from May through October 2023 at the Madison Museum of Contemporary Art in Wisconsin. Floyd Newsum: Evolution of Sight presented early foundational pieces through work made shortly before his death, tracing his journey from realism to more surrealistic and abstract paintings. Newsum explained the exhibition as an examination of a career covering "50-plus years of creating works of art that are exploring color, marks and surfaces in various mediums. I call my evolution in creativity a problem-solving event of expression of the soul.”

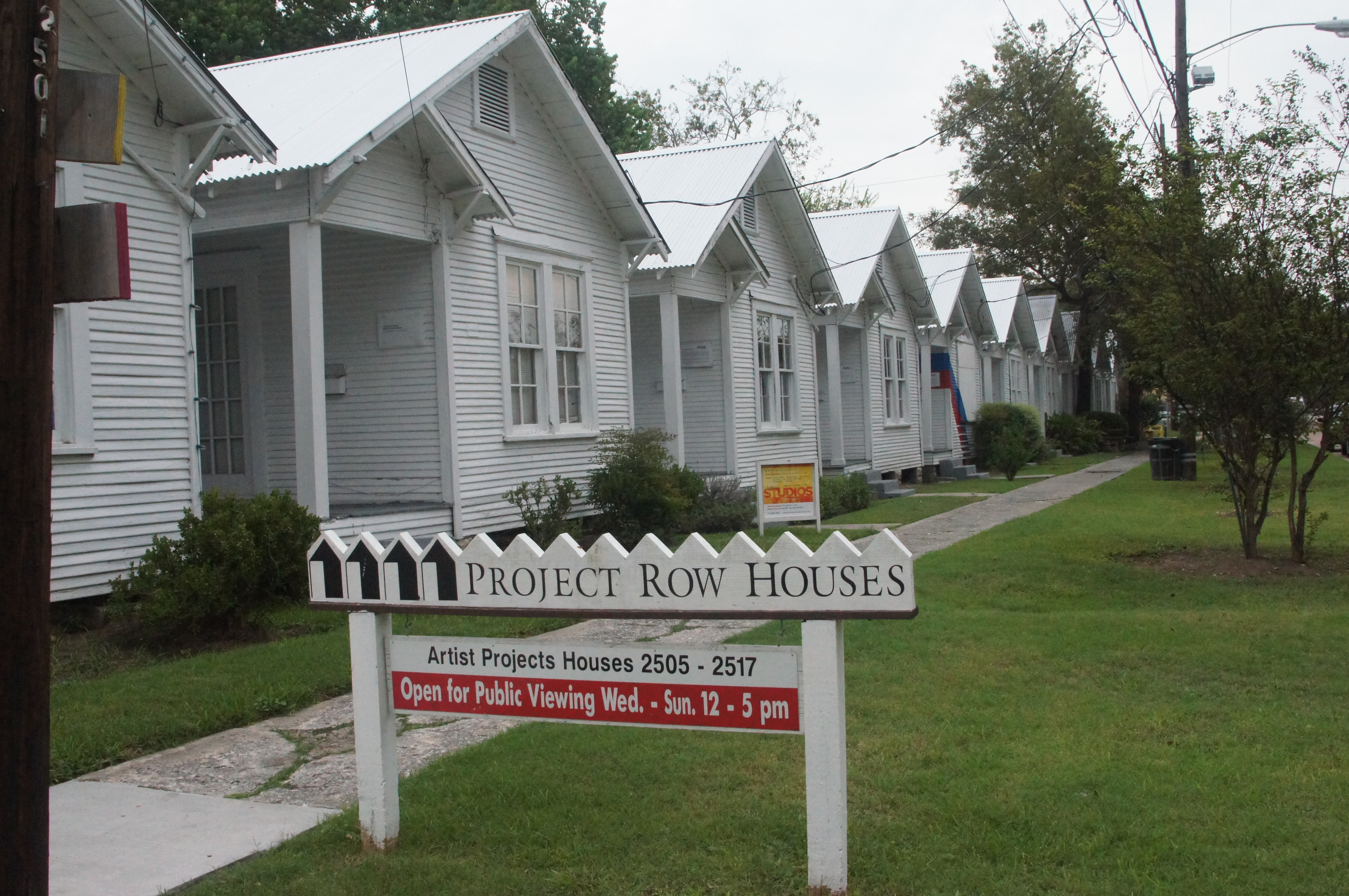
Project Row Houses

During the 1990s, Newsum was one of seven artists to rehabilitate and repurpose 22 shotgun houses in Houston's Third Ward neighborhood. In addition to Newsum, Project Row Houses founders were Rick Lowe, Bert Long Jr., Jesse Lott, James Bettison, Bert Samples and George Smith. The group took what had been a cluster of rundown shacks used by prostitutes and drug dealers and turned them into art studios, galleries and temporary housing for resident artists and single teenaged mothers.

From 1976 to 2024, Newsum taught art at UHD. His courses included drawing, painting, printmaking and art appreciation. He also held a range of administrative positions. As a teacher, he was an encouraging force, his “office” an artist's studio with numerous works mounted on and leaning against the walls as examples for his students. In 2017 and 2003, Newsum received UHD's Scholarship/Creativity Award for his contributions to the field of visual art across a variety of media and thematic explorations. In 2008, he was an Artadia awardee.

When UHD began expanding and renovating the original campus at One Main Street, Floyd played a large part in arranging for renowned artist John Biggers to paint one of his last murals in the refurbished space.

== Work ==
Newsum considered Romare Bearden, Jacob Lawrence, Charles White, Henri Matisse and Marc Chagall among his artistic influences.

Beginning in the early 1970s, most of his work was produced using oil, acrylic, gouache or watercolor paint on paper. Later, he would sometimes mount the paper onto canvas. He enjoyed making tactile surfaces with different colored paints applied to multiple papers combined into a single composition. Less commonly, Newsum made lithographs and silkscreen prints. A term he often used when describing his work was "fractured landscapes."

During his career, he explored numerous styles. His early work largely consists of highly detailed, realistic watercolor portraits. At some point, he abandoned realism in favor of a more surrealistic approach. These richly-colored paintings feature personal, perhaps unconscious, symbols set in complex, loosely defined spaces. A signature pattern of marks and abstract patterns are interwoven with family photos and symbols: fish, birds, dogs and ladders, into layered, textural paintings rendered with a vibrant palette. Though Newsum's style and composition are naïve, his subject matter deals with complex concepts: African American history, black culture, politics, world events, ancestors, spirituality and, "above all, freedom, faith, joy and hope."

== Selected solo exhibits ==
Newsum's solo shows include the following:

- 2023, Floyd Newsum: Evolution of Sight, Madison Museum of Contemporary Art, Madison, Wisconsin
- 2009, Compositions, Marks and Arrangements, HGC Gallery, Dallas, Texas
- 2008, Primary Concerns, Joan Wich Gallery, Houston, Texas
- 2007, Evolution, College of the Mainland, Texas City, Texas
- 2002, One person exhibition, The University of Memphis Art Museum, Memphis, Tennessee
- 2000, One person exhibition of paintings and drawings, O’Kane Gallery, UHD, Houston, Texas
- 1998, One person exhibition, Winston-Salem University, Winston-Salem, North Carolina
- 1989, Floyd Newsum, Barnes-Blackman Gallery, Houston, Texas

Less than a year after his death, Dixon Gallery and Gardens in Newsum's hometown of Memphis mounted the show Floyd Newsum: House of Grace. The exhibition featured large paintings on paper and maquettes for sculptures made between 2002 and 2024.

== Public art projects ==
Newsum's public artworks include two pieces for Houston Metro Light Rail Stations and seven sculptures for Main Street Square in Houston. Four paintings are installed in the Commerce Building of UHD, a suspended sculpture hangs in the lobby of Acres Home Multi-Service Center (Houston) and five suspended sculptures decorate the lobby of the Hazel Harvey Peace Building in Ft. Worth, Texas.

- 2009, Better Living (five hanging sculptures), Hazel Harvey Peace Building, Fort Worth, Texas
- 2005, Ladder of Hope (painted stainless steel sculpture in entrance lobby), Acres Home Multi-Service Center, Houston, Texas
- 2004, Contemplating Success (four paintings for the lobbies of four floors), University of Houston-Downtown, Commerce Building
- 2003, Planter and Stems (seven painted stainless steel sculptures), City of Houston, Main Street Square, Main Street between Dallas and McKinney
- 2002, Houston Metro Light Rail Stations, Main at McGowen and Main at Berry Stations

== Personal life and death ==
Newsum was married for 51 years and had two children, a son and a daughter. He was a deacon at Wheeler Avenue Baptist Church for 22 years. He reportedly tithed a portion of his art sales to the church.

Newsum died unexpectedly in 2024. Friends and former students remembered him as optimistic, humble and dedicated to a purposeful life. He was also known for his colorful personality and playful wit.

Following his death, UHD established an endowed scholarship, the Floyd Newsum Visionary Artist and Humanitarian Scholarship, for students pursuing degrees focused on art or social justice.
