= Rick Lowe =

Houston-based artist and community organizer (born 1961)

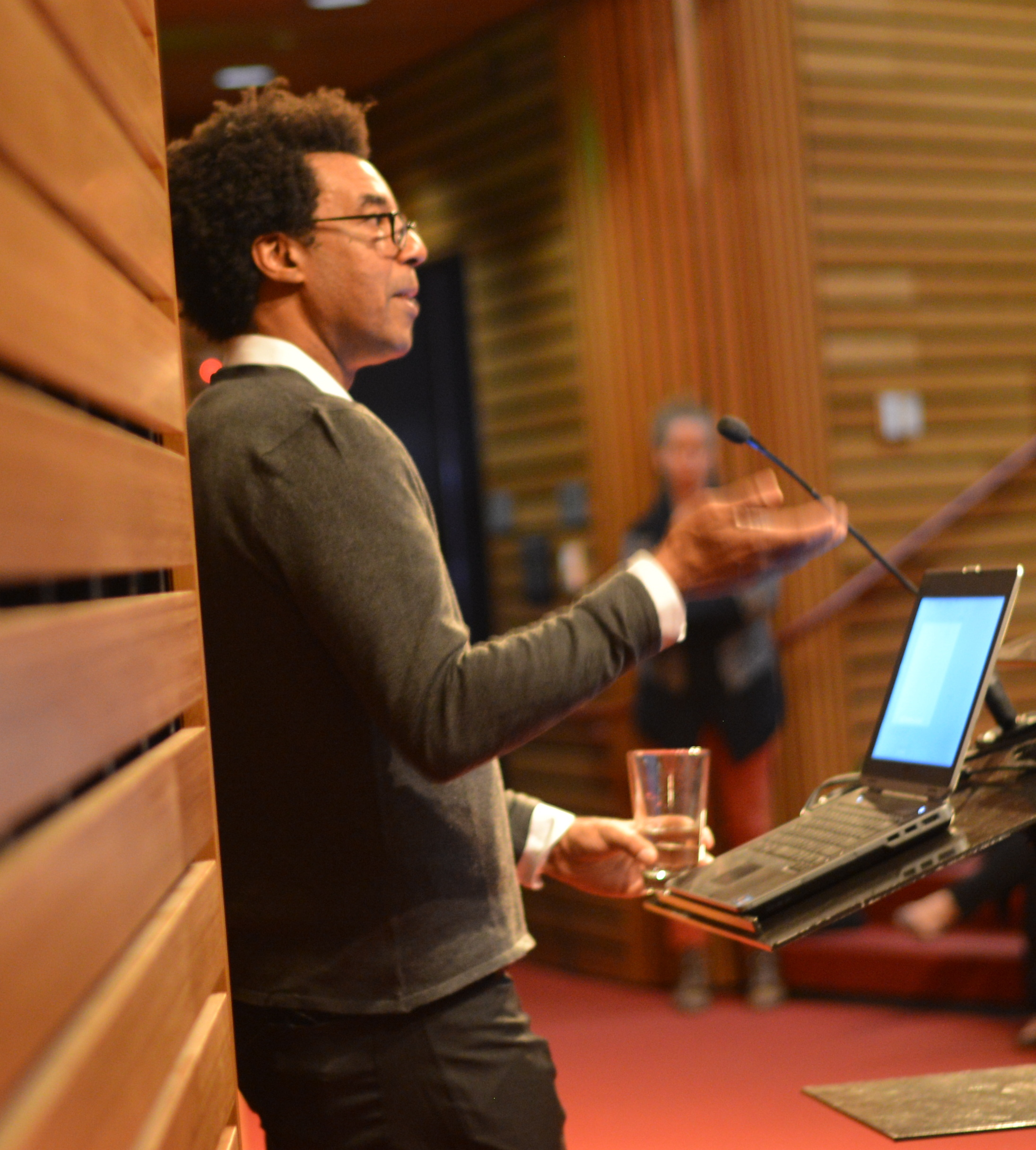
- Education: Columbus State University (then Columbus College); Texas Southern University
- Occupation: artist
- Known for: Social Practice Art
- Awards: Heinz Award in the Arts and Humanities (2002); MacArthur fellowship
- Website: ricklowe.com

Rick Lowe (born 1961) is a Houston-based artist and community organizer, whose Project Row Houses is considered an important example of social-practice art. In 2014, he was among the 21 people awarded a MacArthur "genius" fellowship.

== Early life and education ==
Lowe was born in Eufaula, Alabama as the eighth of twelve children on a sharecropping farm. He was trained as a landscape painter, attending Columbus College in Georgia, before moving to Houston in 1985. There, he created politically charged installations and studied with muralist and painter John Biggers at Texas Southern University.

- 1979-1982: Columbus State University, Columbus, GA.
- 1990-1992: Texas Southern University, Houston, TX.
- 2001-2002: Loeb Fellow, Harvard Graduate School of Design, Cambridge, MA.
- 2013-2015: Mel King Community Fellow, Massachusetts Institute of Technology, Cambridge, MA.

== Work ==
=== Project Row Houses ===
Project Row Houses' mission is " to be the catalyst for transforming community through the celebration of art and African-American history and culture." Employing the terminology of the German artist Joseph Beuys, Lowe describes the project as "social sculpture." He also draws inspiration from the work of artist John T. Biggers (whose own paintings depicted Houston's shotgun houses), working from his Five Pillars: Art and Creativity; Education; Social Safety Nets; Architecture; and Sustainability.

PRH dates from 1993, when Lowe and fellow founding six artists James Bettison, Bert Long Jr., Jesse Lott, Floyd Newsum, Bert Samples, and George Smith, alongside community organizers, arranged for the "purchase and restoration of a block and a half of derelict properties — 22 shotgun houses from the 1930s — in Houston's predominantly African American Third Ward." With funding from the National Endowment for the Arts and the Elizabeth Firestone Graham Foundation, these houses were then converted to arts spaces, revitalizing the neighborhood and providing community development for the blighted neighborhood. More than 20 years later, according to an ArtNews article, the project has grown to 49 buildings spread out over 10 blocks and has a support program for young mothers.

This unusual amalgam of arts venue and community support center has served as a model for Lowe to expand into other neighborhoods in need of revitalization. The artist has initiated similar projects in the Watts Housing Project in Los Angeles, in post-Katrina New Orleans, and in a North Dallas neighborhood with a dense immigrant population.

In 1997 Project Row Houses won the Rudy Bruner Award for Urban Excellence, a national design award that seeks to identify and honor projects that address social and economic concerns of urban design.

=== Other projects ===
In 1999, Lowe served as a selection committee member for the Rudy Bruner Award for Urban Excellence. He received the 8th Annual Heinz Award in the Arts and Humanities in 2002. In 2008, He was a featured speaker at the inaugural Great Lakes ReUse Conference.

Lowe developed Trans.lation: Vickery Meadow for the Nasher Sculpture Center's 10th anniversary exhibition "Nasher XChange" and Victoria Square Project in Athens, Greece as a part of documenta 14 in 2017.

Lowe served as a visiting artist at University of California, Berkeley Arts Research Center, a Loeb Fellow at Harvard University, Haas Center Distinguish Visitor at Stanford University, a Mel King Community Fellow at the Massachusetts Institute of Technology, Breeden Scholar at Auburn University, and a Neubauer Collegium Visiting Fellow at the University of Chicago. In 2016 he joined the faculty at the University of Houston's Kathrine G. McGovern College of the Arts. in 2014. He also sits on the board of Mark Bradford’s Art + Practice Foundation. Lowe had a critically reviewed inaugural exhibition at Storage Art Gallery by artist Onyedika Chuke in 2021, which was Lowe's Manhattan debut exhibition, described by Artforum as "paradigmatic". His first exhibition at Gagosian Gallery in the fall of 2022 further solidified his work interrogates social structures, probing questions on wealth disparity, architectural inequity, and aerial discrepancies.

== Art market ==
Lowe has been represented by Gagosian Gallery since 2021.

== Honors and awards ==
- 1997: Silver Medal by the Rudy Bruner Awards in Urban Excellence (jointly with Project Row Houses)
- 2000: American Institute of Architecture Keystone Award
- 2001–2002: Loeb Fellow at Harvard University (September 2001-June 2002)
- 2002: Theresa Heinz Award in the Arts and Humanities
- 2005: Skowhegan School of Painting and Sculpture Governors Award
- 2005-2006: Osher Fellow at the Exploratorium in San Francisco
- 2006: Brandywine Lifetime Achievement Award
- 2007: Innovator Fellow with the Japan Society
- 2009: Skandalaris Award for Art and Architecture
- 2009: US. Artists Booth Fellowship
- 2010: Creative Time Annenberg Prize for Art and Social Change
- 2011: Visual arts “master artist” at the Atlantic Center for the Arts in New Syrmna Beach, Florida.
- 2013: President Barack Obama appointed Rick to the National Council on the Arts
- 2014: MacArthur "Genius" Fellowship
- 2015: Auburn University Breedan Scholar
- 2015: Honorary Doctorate, Otis College of Art, Los Angeles, CA.
- 2015: Honorary Doctorate, Maryland Institute College of Art, Baltimore, MD.
- 2015: University of Houston’s President’s Medallion Award
- 2016: Distinguished Visitor, Stanford University Haas Center
