= Project Row Houses =

Development in Houston

Coordinates: 29.7320°N 95.3652°W

- Founded: 1993
- Founders: Rick Lowe, James Bettison, Bert Long Jr., Jesse Lott, Floyd Newsum, Bert Samples, George Smith
- Type: Arts and culture organization
- Purpose: Engaging neighbors, artists, and enterprises in collective creative action to help materialize sustainable opportunities in marginalized communities.
- Location: Houston, Texas
- Region served: Third Ward
- Website: projectrowhouses.org

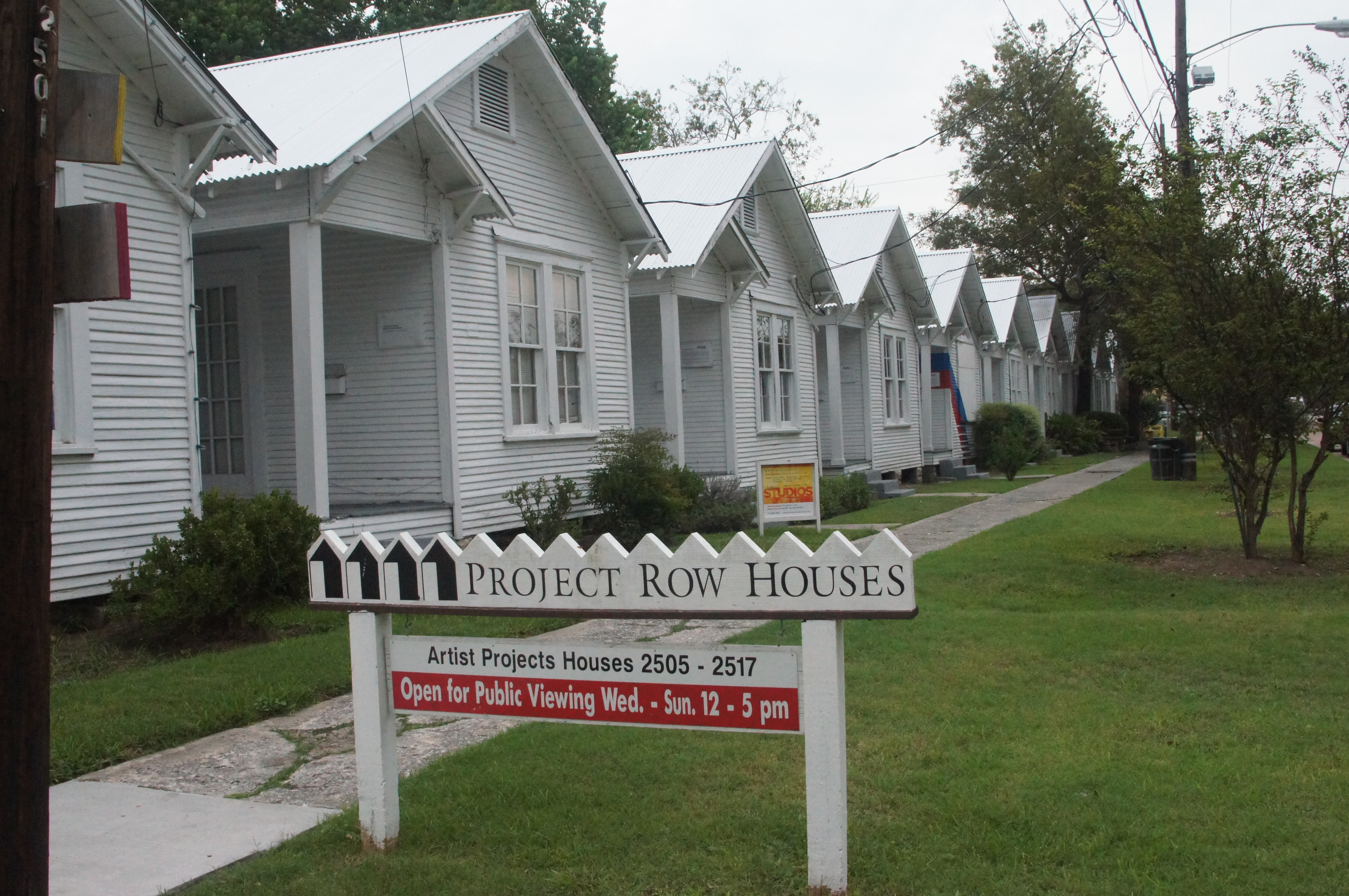
Project Row Houses

Project Row Houses is a development in the Third Ward area of Houston, Texas. Project Row Houses includes a group of shotgun houses restored in the 1990s. Eight houses serve as studios for visiting artists. Those houses are art studios for art related to African-American themes. A row behind the art studio houses single mothers.

== History ==
Rick Lowe, a native of Alabama and 2014 MacArthur "genius" grant winner, founded Project Row Houses in 1993 with James Bettison, Bert Long Jr., Jesse Lott, Floyd Newsum, Bert Samples, and George Smith. In 1990, according to Lowe, a group of high school students approached Lowe and asked him to create solutions to problems instead of creating works that tell the community about issues it is already aware of. Lowe and a coalition of artists purchased a group of 22 shotgun houses across two blocks that were built in 1930 and, by the 1990s, were in poor condition.

Inspired by the work of John T. Biggers, the group used seed money funds from the Elizabeth Firestone Graham Foundation and the National Endowment for the Arts to restore the houses. Corporate sponsor Chevron renovated the outside of several shotgun houses. The director of the Menil Foundation allowed Monday to be a day off of work for the employees so that they could help renovate the shotgun houses. Volunteers numbering in the hundreds fortified porches, removed trash and used needles from lots, and hung wallboard. Several individuals and families from the area and one local church "adopted" individual houses. Garnet Coleman adopted one house. The houses first opened in 1994.

Deborah Grotfeldt created the concept of the Young Mothers Residential Program, which began operations in 1996; Grotfeldt had worked with Lowe since the Project Row Houses project started. The program gives single mothers one year of housing to allow them to finish their education and organize themselves.

As of 2009 the Project Row Houses campus had 40 properties. As of that year, some houses have art exhibitions and some houses provide housing space for resident artists. Newer low income housing blocks, using designs provided by the Rice Building Workshop, are now a part of the campus. The program for young mothers uses seven shotgun houses. A playground is adjacent to those houses. In addition, several shotgun houses built in the Victorian era, moved there earlier from historically black communities under development, are a part of the campus. The Eldorado Ballroom and the Bert Long sculpture "Field of Vision" are a part of the campus. Lisa Gray of the Houston Chronicle said during that year "Driving around, this writer found it's hard to tell where the Row Houses campus begins and ends."

== Housing ==
The Young Mothers Residential Program was a year-long program for women between ages 18–25. The participants for the program were recruited using a thorough screening process. The women were required to continue their formal education and attend counselling and parenting sessions during their residency. The program was financed by private funds. The five houses, 540 square feet each were designed free of charge by local interior designers for the women and their children.

The School of Architecture at Rice University created the Rice Building Workshop (RBW) in collaboration with Project Row Houses to address the unavailability of affordable accommodation in Third Ward. RBW engaged in conversations with residents of Third Ward and participants of the Young Mothers Residential Program. The architecture students analysed the styles of the houses and the appeal of the neighbourhood and gained insights through their exchange with community residents.

== Art ==
In 1994, Project Row Houses hosted its first eight residents artists each of whom received a compensation of $2,000.The artists' were David Magee, Tierney Malone, Annette Lawrence, Floyd Newsum, Jesse Lott, Colette Veasey, Vicki Meek and Steve Jones.

== Community Support ==
Project Row Houses has assisted entrepreneurs through a small business incubation program by providing premises at very low rent. This financial aid is aimed to facilitate the growth of small businesses. A product of the incubation program was Kindred Stories, a bookstore that moved to a new space at Project Row Houses in 2021. Another store Gulf Coast Cosmos Comicbook Co. opened right beside Kindred Stories in the same year.

In 2025, Project Row Houses also completed a $9.7 million renovation for the Eldorado Ballroom. The ballroom was donated to Project Row Houses by its owner in 1999.

Small businesses receiving mentorship through the Business Residency Program in 2025 include Third Ward Blooms, Piano Vibes, Back to Naturel and Come Bee Well House.

== Education ==
Children living in the houses attend schools in the Houston Independent School District. Zoned schools include Blackshear Elementary School, Cullen Middle School, and Yates High School. Students were previously zoned to Ryan Middle School before 2013; students were reassigned to Cullen after it closed. Beginning in 2018 the magnet middle school Baylor College of Medicine Academy at Ryan also serves as a boundary option for students zoned to Blackshear, Lockhart, and MacGregor elementary schools.

== Funding ==
In 2006, the Houston City Council gave Project Row Houses a grant of $975,000.

MacKenzie Scott, former wife of Jeff Bezos and her second husband Dan Jewett named Project Row Houses as a beneficiary of their charitable gifts in 2021. The amount has not been disclosed.

== Resident alumni of Artist Rounds ==
- Terry Adkins
- Edgar Arceneaux
- Michelle Barnes
- William Cordova
- Erika DeFreitas
- Brendan Fernandes
- Coco Fusco
- Charles Gaines
- Leslie Hewitt
- Ayana Jackson
- Ayanna Jolivet McCloud
- Rodney McMillian
- Charles Huntley Nelson
- Mendi & Keith Obadike
- Lovie Olivia
- Robert Pruitt
- Kameelah Janan Rasheed
- Martine Syms
- Tatyana Fazlalizadeh
- Autumn Knight
- Otobong Nkanga
- Tricia Ward
- Question Bridge: Black Males ( Chris Johnson, Bayete Ross Smith, Hank Willis Thomas and Kamal Sinclair)
- In-Situ, William Titley, Kerry Morrison, and Paul Hartley

== Honors ==
- 1997: Rudy Bruner Award for Urban Excellence silver medal
