= Onyedika Chuke =

Nigerian-American artist and curator

- Born: Onitsha, Nigeria
- Known for: Visual Art
- Movement: Contemporary art
- Website: http://onyedikachuke.com

Onyedika Chuke (born in Onitsha, Nigeria) is a Nigerian-American art dealer, artist, and curator, living in New York City. He is the founder of Storage, an art gallery in Manhattan and was an assistant professor of art at the Columbia University School of the Arts.

== Career ==
Chuke was born in Onitsha, Nigeria and raised in New York City. He graduated from Cooper Union in 2011 with a Bachelor of Arts, and also attended the Skowhegan School of Painting and Sculpture. Chuke has also partipicpated at fellowships including at the Yale School of Art, Department of Cultural Affairs, and American Academy in Rome. Art critic Jerry Saltz described Chuke's work as "material-and-intellectual genius akin to Bruce Nauman." As an artist, Chuke has had solo presentations at The Arts Center at Governors Island, Pioneer Works, The Shed (arts center), and the Bronx Museum of the Arts.

== Gallery ==
In 2020, in response to the Black Lives Matter protests, Chuke founded Storage, a gallery in Tribeca. With a focus to support artists from marginalized communities, Chuke also supports his local New York City community as an arts educator for Studio in a School, Foster Pride, and the Rikers Island jail complex "to help offer avenues for self-expression and healing through access to art for prison inmates." Chuke has worked with and shown artists including William Cordova, Rick Lowe, and Emory Douglas, the minister of culture for the Black Panther Party at Storage. Through the gallery he has launched (ART) Application Readiness and Techniques, a mentorship that supports arts education, job readiness, and financial literacy for BIPOC teens, Foster youth, and young adults.

== Collections ==
Chuke's work is collected by the Verbier Sculpture Park, American Academy in Rome, Socrates Sculpture Park, The Shed (arts center), Drawing Center, and SCAD Museum of Art.
