= Bucksbaum Award =

- Description: Awarded to an artist in the Whitney Biennial for talent and imagination
- Country: United States
- Presented by: Whitney Museum of American Art

The Bucksbaum Award was established in 2000 by the Bucksbaum Family Foundation and the Whitney Museum of American Art. It is awarded biannually "to honor an artist, living and working in the United States, whose work demonstrates a singular combination of talent and imagination." The $100,000 prize is the world's largest award given to an individual visual artist.

The Bucksbaum Award is always give to an artist whose work is displayed in that year's Whitney Biennial, a showcase for young and lesser known American artists. The award recognizes an artist who "has the potential to make a lasting impact on the history of American art."

== laureates ==
Previous Bucksbaum laureates include:

- 2000 Paul Pfeiffer
- 2002 Irit Batsry
- 2004 Raymond Pettibon
- 2006 Mark Bradford
- 2008 Omer Fast
- 2010 Michael Asher
- 2012 Sarah Michelson
- 2014 Zoe Leonard
- 2019 Tiona Nekkia McClodden

Previous Bucksbaum jurors include:

- 2019 David Breslin
- 2019 Ryan N. Dennis
- 2019 Rujeko Hockley
- 2019 René Morales
- 2019 Jane Panetta
- 2019 Scott Rothkopf
- 2019 Lumi Tan
