= Viktor Lowenfeld =

Austrian-born art educator

Austrian Viktor Lowenfeld (1903–1960) was an Austrian-born professor of art education at the Hampton Institute and the Pennsylvania State University. His ideas influenced many art educators in the post-World War II United States. In particular, he emphasized "ways in which children at different stages of artistic development should be stimulated by appropriate media and themes, and ... the curriculum ... guided mainly by developmental considerations."

== Biography ==
Born in Linz, Austria, in 1903, Viktor Lowenfeld had always been drawn to the arts. Through his personal narration, Lowenfeld mentioned that he was pulling toward music at an early age – probably four or five. He started to play violin at the age of nine or ten. And because he used to play by ear, rather than reading notes, he was often called a “Gypsy.” That same year Lowenfeld started painting. This early exposure to the visual and performing arts led him to a career devoted to the practice of educating himself and the public in art.

Dr. Lowenfeld graduated from the College of Applied Arts in Vienna, as well as the Academy of Fine Arts in the same city. He later received his doctorate in Education from the University of Vienna, and during this time served as an elementary and secondary school teacher. While in Vienna, he also served as the director of art in the Blind Institute. In 1938 Lowenfeld fled to England before arriving in the United States. He became a citizen in 1946 after serving in the Navy as a wartime visual aids consultant.

Lowenfeld joined the Hampton Institute in Virginia in 1939 as assistant professor of Industrial Arts, studio art teacher, and later Chairman of the Art Department. In 1945 he was named curator of the distinguished collection of Black African Art at the Hampton Institute. Lowenfeld came to The Pennsylvania State University as professor of Art Education in 1946. Ten years later he became head of the newly founded Department of Art Education. He stayed in this position until his death in 1960. Dr. Lowenfeld is well known for his Visual-Haptic theory in Art Education which was assimilated from Viennese sources. He always regarded good teaching as a dialogue, therefore his motivation and evaluations had a strong Expressionist bias. His psychological training enabled him to gain a therapeutic position in his early months in America, labeling him a “Viennese Psychologist” in Time. He was an active leader in the National Art Education Association and The National Committee on Art Education.

According to Peter Smith, “Lowenfeld is still a name of power in American art education. Although his own death, and the deaths and retirements of his disciples, have lessened Lowenfeldian political in academia (and therefore in teacher education), his concepts go marching on.” Lowenfeld’s philosophy reached a large audience through the theories documented in his books: Genesis of Sculpturing, 1932; Sculptures by the Blind, 1934; The Nature of Creativity, 1938; Creative and Mental Growth, 1947; and Your Child and his Art. He also published numerous articles on art education aesthetics, art for the handicapped, black art, and testing. He published more than one hundred articles.

Among his students was the American muralist John T. Biggers.

== Creative and Mental Growth ==
Lowenfeld's 1947 Creative and Mental Growth was published and became the single most influential textbook in art education. Many elementary school teacher preparation programs used this book since it described characteristics of child art. Lowenfeld believed evidence of aesthetic, social, physical, intellectual, and emotional growth is reflected in the art of children.

He further developed a theory of stages in artistic development. The stages consisted of

1. scribble;
2. preschematic;
3. schematic;
4. Dawning Realism;
5. Pseudorealism; and
6. Period of decision/crisis.

Lowenfeld's ideas of art as a catalyst of creativity have prompted many research dissertations in the field of art education.

== The Lowenfeld Memorial Collection ==
Viktor Lowenfeld left behind an association of friends and followers including Edward L. Mattil who helped establish the Viktor Lowenfeld Memorial Fund. Dr. Mattil, at the time of Dr. Lowenfeld’s death, was also asked to serve as head of the Department of Art Education. The Memorial Fund was administered by a local committee composed of Elizabeth Yeager, Yar Chomicky, George Pappas, Walter C. Reid, and George S. Zoretich; and by the National Committee which included Kenneth R. Beittel, Mayo Brice, F. Louis Hoover, Edward L. Mattil, Charles M. Robertson and D. Kenneth Winebrenner. The national memorial provided moneys for research papers by eminent scholars every second year at the NAEA convention. About five such papers have been delivered. The money of the local committee was spent to purchase sculpture, trees, and plaques for a memorial garden area at Penn State College of Education. During this drive, graduated students contributed paintings, sculptures, and drawings to the Lowenfeld Memorial Collection.

The contributions are still welcomed today. The collection which amounts to more than seventy works is located within the Arts Cottage, the Chambers Building, the Cedar Building, and the Rackley Building at the University Park Campus.

== Bibliography ==
- "Lowenfeld Speaks of His Life." A lecture given at The Pennsylvania State University, Part A and B.
- Smith, P. "The Hampton Year: Lowenfeld's Forgotten Legacy," Journal of Art Education, vol. 41, no. 6, 1988, 38–42.
- Smith, P. "Lowenfeld in a Viennese Perspective: Formative Influences for the American Art Educator," Journal of Studies in Art Education, vol. 30, no. 2, 1989, 104–114.
