= Ayanna Jolivet McCloud =

Artist from Houston, Texas, US (b. 1978)

Ayanna McCloud
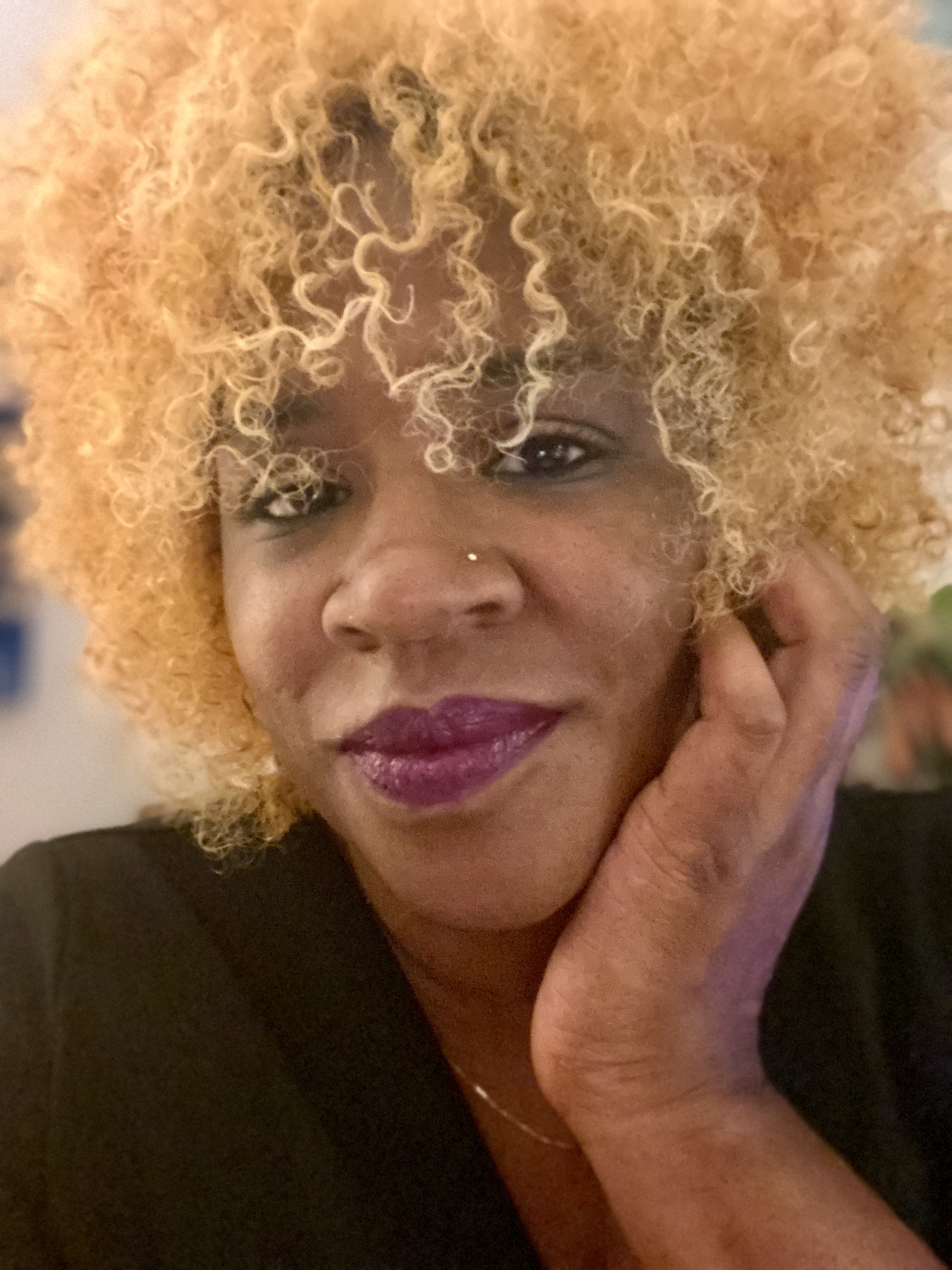
- Born: 1978 (age 47–48); Houston, Texas
- Education: School of Art Institute of Chicago
- Occupation: Artist
- Style: Minimalist; installation art; land art
- Awards: Houston Arts Alliance Individual Artist Grant Idea Fund Stimulus Grant; 2015 labotanica
- Website: www.ayannannaya.com

Ayanna Jolivet McCloud (born 1978) is a visual and performance artist, writer, and educator from Houston, Texas. She is known for her minimalist aesthetic and multimedia sound performances.

== Early life and education ==
McCloud grew up in Houston. She received a BA in visual and critical studies from the Art Institute of Chicago. Although she trained as a painter, McCloud evolved her art practice into multimedia work combining sound, text, and performance.

For over fifteen years, McCloud worked in non-profit administration at various arts organizations around the United States. She currently works as the director of education & public programs at Houston Botanic Garden.

== Career ==
McCloud has participated in residencies and exhibitions throughout the Americas, including the United States, Caribbean Islands, and Central and South America. She was a participating artist in Project Row Houses, Round 42: The One and the Many: A Self-portrait in Seven Parts, which was organized by curator Sally Frater as a response to and reflection on the Project Row Houses mission and her time in Houston and Houston's Third Ward. For this project, McCloud created a piece titled Score [how to hold on to chasms and fill with matter], in which she used sound, sculpture, and text in an effort to create a meditative environment to explore trauma, hollowness, and grieving. This project was reflective of much of McCloud's work as minimal at least on the surface but full of layers if one looks beyond the surface. The project also included a workshop, Writing in the Margins, hosted by McCloud.

McCloud was also the founder and director of La Botanica, a collaborative arts workspace and community planning hub in Houston. In addition to creating space for artists and community to collaborate, McCloud herself has done collaborative work, including work with other artists and audience participation. In 2017, McCloud's Score: Field Work opened at Art League Houston. The installation included visual components and experimental sound scores created by women artists, along with live performances by McCloud and others.

Early in her career, McCloud began playing with themes of spirituality and the body, often incorporating symbols and ritual imagery from Vodou and other diasporic religions. This can be seen in her 2006 installation and performance Goofer Dust at Miami's Diaspora Vibe Gallery, in which visual elements such as chickens, earth, and ritualistic performance, along with the concept of collective dreaming and the title of the show itself (Goofer Dust), reflect Vodou's aesthetics and beliefs. Inviting audience members to participate during the original performance of Goofer Dust, McCloud aimed to evoke the spiritual and supernatural potential that collective dreaming is thought to possess. With this participation and the surrounding symbols, Goofer Dust explored the body's relation to space, time, nature, community, the celestial, and ultimately itself. In some of her work, McCloud uses veves, line drawn symbols used in Vodou to invoke the Iwas (Loas). This can be seen in Damballah Study, in which McCloud drew the symbols on a field of grass, as well as in Delete/Borrar/Efase and Crossroads, where veves for specific Iwas are used to create installations.

She was an advisory council member of the Mayor's Art and Cultural Plan for the City of Houston. Currently, she is director of education and public programs at the Houston Botanic Garden, creating the organization's first-ever public programs that will link plants, nature, people, and culture.

McCloud was the recipient of an Individual Artist Grant Award funded by the city of Houston through Houston Arts Alliance. In 2015, she also received a Stimulus Grant from the Idea Fund for the online launch of La Botanica with an online store and blog featuring artists and ecologists.

== Work ==
From McCloud's CV:

=== Solo exhibitions/performances ===
- 2006 - goofer dust, Diaspora Vibe Cultural Arts Incubator, Miami, Florida (performance)
- 2006 - one: sugar blood ( canibala series), PoPop Studios, Nassau, Bahamas (performance)
- 2004 - under, Polvo Art Studio, Chicago, Illinois
- 2003 - Marks, Base Space, School of the Art Institute of Chicago, Chicago, Illinois

=== Group exhibitions ===
- 2020 - Slowed and Throwed: Records of the City Through Mutated Lenses, Contemporary Arts Museum Houston, Houston, Texas
- 2006 - International Conceptual Video Screening, Commerce Street Warehouse, Houston, Texas
- 2006 - The Ephemeral and the Remaining, State University of New York, Oswego, New York
- 2006 - Memorias de un Mexicano: Homage to Francisco Mora, Chicago State University, Chicago, Illinois
- 2005 - Out Castes: Crossing the line to the Model Majority: Contemporary Art of the Caribbean Diaspora, Miami, Florida 2005 Complement, Art Center/ South Florida, Miami Beach, Florida
- 2005 - Off the Main: The Show of Contemporary African, Caribbean, and Latin American Art, Puck Building, New York
- 2005 - Casket Factory, Dallas, Texas
- 2005 - Memorias de un Mexicano: Homage to Francisco Mora, Gallery 214, Northern Illinois University, De Kalb, Illinois
- 2004 - Memorias de un Mexicano: Homage to Francisco Mora, Max Von Isser Gallery of Art, Elgin College, Elgin, Illinois
- 2004 - Theft, Galeria Tinta Roja, Chicago, Illinois
- 2004 - function : assimilate, functionvariable, Barcelona, Spain
- 2003 - Turn On, Artist Relief/ Harem, Chicago, Illinois
- 2002 - Siragusa Gallery, Chicago, Illinois
- 2000 - freshmix, Community Artists' Collective, Houston, Texas
- 1999 - Urban Girls, El Museo Francisco Oller y Diego Rivera, Buffalo, New York

Some more of her projects include Hear Her Ear, a series devoted to women in sound art; School of Latitudes, an artist residency, and workshops including Writing in the Margins presented at Project Row Houses and How to Frame Pauses, Holism, and Magical Thinking in New Arts Infrastructures at Art League Houston.
