= Robert Pruitt (artist) =

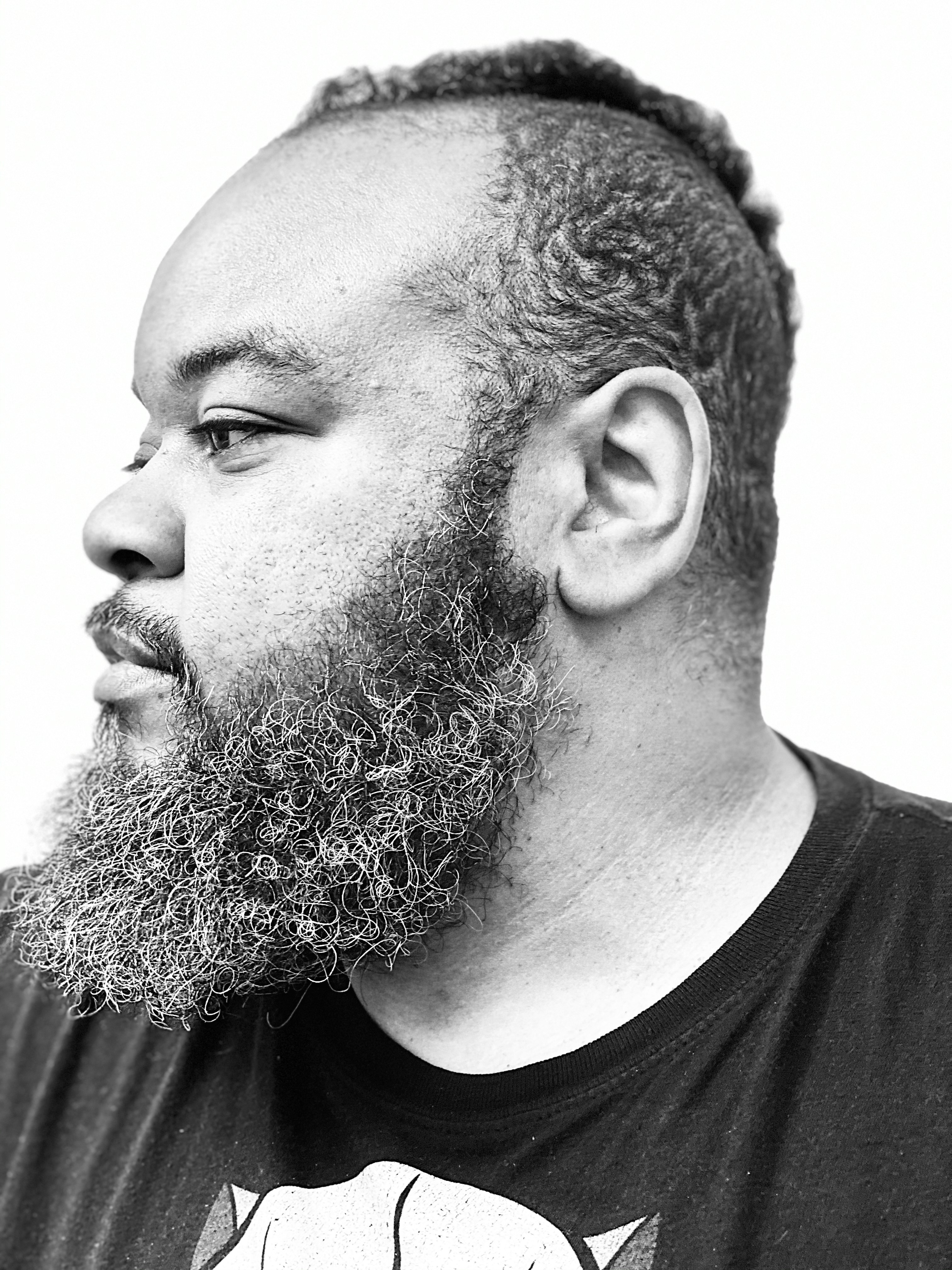
- Born: 1975 (age 50–51); Houston, Texas
- Education: 2003 MFA, University of Texas at Austin; Austin Texas 2002 Skowhegan School of Painting and Sculpture; Skowhegan, Maine 2000 BA, Texas Southern University; Houston, Texas 1999 Tougaloo College Tougaloo Art Colony; Jackson, Mississippi
- Known for: Drawing, painting, photography, sculpture, animation
- Notable work: Otabenga Jones & Associates; MF Problem
- Style: Large scale drawings
- Partner: Autumn Knight
- Website: robert-pruitt.com

Robert Pruitt (born 1975) is a visual artist from Houston, Texas living in New York City who is known for his figurative drawings and who also works with sculpture, photography, and animation.

== Early life and education ==
Born in 1975 in Houston, TX, Pruitt grew up in Houston's Third and Fourth Wards, frequently in and around his family's funeral home, Pruitt and Pruitt. He earned a Bachelor of Arts from Texas Southern University in Houston, Texas in 2000 and Master of Fine Arts from the University of Texas at Austin in 2003. From 2004–2008, he was a curator at Project Row Houses.

== Artistic career ==
A participant in both the 2010 SITE Santa Fe Eighth International Biennial: The Dissolve and the 2006 Whitney Biennial: Day for Night, Pruitt was awarded residencies at the Tamarind Institute in Albuquerque, New Mexico in 2014 and 2015, the Bemis Center for Contemporary Arts in Omaha, Nebraska in 2015, Gallery MOMO in Johannesburg, South Africa in 2015, and The Joan Mitchell Center in New Orleans, Louisiana in 2016.

== Otabenga Jones & Associates ==
Pruitt is a founding member of the Houston artist collective, Otabenga Jones & Associates, alongside Dawolu Jabari Anderson, Jamal Cyrus, and Kenya Evans. Initially created in 2002, they worked in a studio underneath the Eldorado Ballroom and the name comes from Ota Benga, an African pygmy who in 1906 was put on display at the Bronx Zoo. A century later in 2006, all four members of the OBJA were individually selected for the Whitney Biennial, and the collective was chosen to participate as well. They follow in the legacy of John Biggers, who founded the art program at Texas Southern University, where the four associates met in 1994 in the drawing class taught by Harvey Johnson.

== MF Problem ==
Formed in 2012 in Houston with Autumn Knight, fellow artist and Pruitt's partner, the collective has been based in New York, New York since 2016. Together, they focus on "collaborative, conceptual, visual and performative strategies that critique the divisions of race, power, and inequalities found in national and global social structures. MF Problem creates artwork in response to their real life as an artist couple, as visionaries, and as black magicians, and as time travelers."

== Selected Exhibition History ==
- Day for Night, Whitney Biennial 2006, New York
- Lessons from Below: Otabenga Jones & Associates, 2007, The Menil Collection
- Robert Pruitt: Women, 2013, Studio Museum, Harlem, New York
- Robert Pruitt: Planetary Survey, 2017, Koplin Del Rio Gallery, Seattle
- Robert Pruitt: Benediction, 2017, Ulrich Museum of Art, Wichita State University, Wichita Kansas
- Robert Pruitt: Devotion, 2018–19, California African American Museum, Los Angeles
- The Majesty of Kings Long Dead, 2019, Koplin Del Rio Gallery, Seattle
- The Banner Project: Robert Pruitt, 2019–20, Museum of Fine Arts, Boston
- Hear Me Now: The Black Potters of Old Edgefield, South Carolina, The Metropolitan Museum of Art, New York, 2022. Traveled to Museum of Fine Arts, Boston, March 4–July 9, 2023,
- Robert Pruitt: Infinite, 2026–27, Contemporary Arts Museum Houston

== Awards ==
- The Arch and Anne Giles Kimbrough Fund Award, 1999
- Cultural Arts Council of Houston Award Emerging Artist Grant, 1999
- Artadia Award, Houston, 2004
- Louis Comfort Tiffany Foundation Award, 2007
- Creative Capital Foundation Award, 2007
- Art Matters Foundation Grant, 2009
- Artist of the Year, Houston Art Fair, 2013
- William H. Johnson Foundation for the Arts Prize, 2013
- Idea Fund Grant, 2014
- Bemis Center for Contemporary Arts Artist In Residence, 2015
- Joan Mitchell Foundation Award, 2016
- Medal of Arts, Art in Embassies, U.S. Department of State, 2023
