= Eldorado Ballroom =

Building in Houston, Texas, US

Coordinates: 29°44′4.4″N 95°21′55.6″W

Eldorado Ballroom is a former nightclub in the Third Ward, Houston, on the other side of the road from Emancipation Park. The white brick and stucco Art Moderne building has 10,000 square feet (930 m^{2}) of space.

Caroline Love of Houston Public Media described it as "A pillar of Houston’s historic music scene". Leigh Cutler, in Houston History Magazine, stated that the Eldorado Ballroom "was representative of the last pinnacle of black culture in Houston before Jim Crow laws dissoived."

The name refers to a nickname of the Savoy Ballroom in New York City.

Musical styles at the venue included blues and jazz.

== History ==
It was established in 1939, by Anna and Charles Dupree. Lenard Gabert designed the building. The club itself was on the second floor while five storefronts, housing various businesses, were on the first floor. Windows were used for cooling as the facility did not yet have air conditioning. Black newspapers frequently carried notices for events at the Eldorado Ballroom. It had the advertising tagline "Home of Happy Feet".

The club closed circa 1972.

In 2001 Project Row Houses had a plan to renovate the Eldorado Ballroom so it would become a Third Ward arts site.

In 2022 there was a plan to renovate the Eldorado Ballroom, which would cost $9.7 million. Forney Construction was responsible for the project, which included a proposal for a 5,000-square-foot (460 m^{2}) annex building for events and a restaurant. Project Row Houses directed the renovation. The plans called for revamping the plumbing and wiring.

On July 22, 2022, the African American Cultural Heritage Action Fund gave the Eldorado Ballroom a $3 million grant.

The Eldorado Ballroom reopened on March 30, 2023.

== See also ==
- History of African-Americans in Houston
