= Houston Botanic Garden =

Botanic garden in Houston, Texas

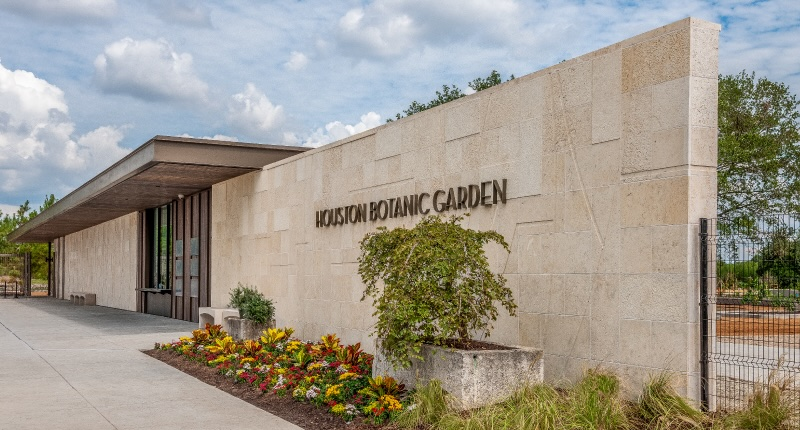
- Houston Botanic Garden Entrance
- Interactive map of Houston Botanic Garden
- Type: Botanic
- Location: 1 Botanic Lane, Houston, Texas
- Coordinates: 29°41′15″N 95°16′12″W
- Area: 132 acres (53 ha)
- Opened: 2020; 6 years ago
- Status: Open year-round
- Website: hbg.org

The Houston Botanic Garden is a public botanic garden located in the Park Place neighborhood of Houston, Texas, along the Sims Bayou. The 132-acre (530,000 m^{2}) garden contains a variety of cultivated gardens, including the Global Collection Garden and Culinary garden, and also hosts seasonal events like "Radiant Nature".

Opened in 2020, the Garden is located on the former site of the Glenbrook Golf Course. The Garden is operated as a 501(c) non-profit organization and is a member of the American Public Gardens Association and Botanic Gardens Conservation International.

== See also ==
- List of botanical gardens in the United States
