= Erika DeFreitas =

Canadian multidisciplinary artist

- Born: 1980 (age 45–46); Toronto, Ontario, Canada
- Education: University of Toronto, York University
- Website: http://www.erikadefreitas.com

Erika DeFreitas (born 1980) is a Toronto-based artist who works in textiles, performance and photography.

== Early life ==
Erika DeFreitas was born in Toronto, Canada, with ancestry in Guyana. Her grandmother taught baking and cake decorating classes at home in Guyana, which later influenced DeFreitas' work The Impossible Speech Act (2007). DeFreitas' mother has featured heavily in her work as both collaborator and subject, beginning in 2007 as DeFreitas was researching loss and mourning, with a focus on relationships and her own fear of losing her mother. Her relationship with her mother has been a large part of her work. Says DeFreitas, "Some of the major themes in my practice are mourning and loss, matrilineal narratives, post memory, and cultural identity".

== Education ==
DeFreitas earned a Master of Visual Studies from the University of Toronto (2008); a Bachelor of Education from York University (2004) and a Bachelor of Art and Art History from the University of Toronto (2003).

== Career ==
Through a postcolonial lens, Erika DeFreitas explores language, cultural loss and identity politics and places emphasis on process, the gesture and documentation. She has been awarded the 2016 Finalist Artist Prize from the Toronto Friends of Visual Arts and the 2016 John Hartman Award from the MacLaren Art Centre in Barrie, ON. DeFreitas was artist-in-residence at Alice Yard, Port of Spain, Trinidad and Tobago (2017; Also As Well Too, Winnipeg, MB (2015); and Mentoring Artists for Women's Art (MAWA), Winnipeg, MB (2010).

DeFeitas created a series aptly named Pass-port where she manipulated her passport to explore the ambiguities of her own identity and nationality.

In 2003 DeFreitas completed a project called Something Pretty Cozy, literally covering street fixtures with yarn cozies. She created the tatting tradition by exhibiting doilies but in the contemporary format of digital prints depicting the artist manipulating the objects with her body. DeFreitas continued the manipulation and examination of her body versus objects in a series of photographs called I Am Not Tragically Colored (after Zora Neale Hurston) where she distorted her face against a piece of glass that separated the viewer and herself.

DeFreitas' work can be found in many permanent collections, including Wedge Curatorial Projects; Hart House Permanent Collection; Feminist Art Gallery (F.A.G.); Canada Council Art Bank; and TD Canada Trust Art Collection.

DeFreitas is the recipient of several municipal, provincial and federal awards and grants from the Toronto Friends of Visual Arts, the Toronto Arts Council, the Ontario Arts Council, and the Canada Council for the Arts.

Erika DeFreitas' work has been exhibited in Canada and the United States of America. Solo exhibitions explore ideas of absence, loss, memorialization and ritual, including the 2015 exhibition The Work of Mourning, Art Gallery of Mississauga, Mississauga, ON and Deaths/Memorials/Births, presented in 2013 at the Centre for Print and Media Arts, Hamilton, ON. and 2008 at Platform Centre for Photographic + Digital Arts, Winnipeg, MB.

DeFreitas was inspired by her mother's obsession with reading newspaper obituaries and created her work, Deaths/Memorials/Births, where she unpacked the concept of memorialization in newspapers and manipulated these ideas through intuitively cutting and not cutting text from the obituaries to create works evoking found poetry. She continued to be inspired by and sometimes work in collaboration with her mother, such as in the work presented in the 2016 exhibition ; it was in the air, as they say and the 2009 exhibition In The Bedroom, both at Gallery 44, Toronto ON. Their collaborative textile work entitled Sometimes the Metonymic Object Is an Absence, a crochet blanket mimicking those in their family home, that visitors are invited to unravel, was included in The One and the Many: A Self-Portrait in Seven Parts, a 2015 group exhibition at Project Row Houses (Houston, TX).

Her work has also been presented in many group exhibitions, including at the Art Gallery of Windsor (Windsor, ON); Aljira, a Center of Contemporary Art (Newark, NJ); Justina M. Barnicke Gallery (Toronto, ON), and Houston Museum of African American Culture (Houston, TX)

Her work was featured alongside artists Sheila Pree Bright, Kwesi Abbensetts and Hew Locke in an issue of Transitions Magazine themed around Black childhood.

== Solo exhibitions ==
- 2020: an object, a gesture, a scene, Visual Arts Centre of Clarington, Bowmanville, ON.
- 2019: an object, a gesture, a scene, Open Studio, Toronto, ON
- 2019: It is now here that I have gathered and measured yes, Gallery TPW, Toronto, ON.
- 2018: like a conjuring, Platform Centre for Photographic + Digital Arts, Winnipeg, MB
- 2017: Like a conjuring (bringing water back to Bradley), The Anchorage Bradley Museums, Mississauga, ON.
- 2016: ; it was in the air, as they say, Gallery 44, Toronto, ON.
- 2015: The Work of Mourning, Art Gallery of Mississauga, Mississauga, ON.
- 2013: Deaths/Memorials/Births, Centre for Print and Media Arts, Hamilton, ON.
- 2009: In The Bedroom Series, Gallery 44, Toronto, ON.
- 2008: Deaths/Memorials/Births, Platform Centre for Photographic + Digital Arts, Winnipeg, MB.

== Reviews/essays/interviews ==
- Nicholls, Sophie. "Battling against in-school discrimination." 24 Hours, December 4, 2005, p. 6.
- Whyte, Murray. " Random acts of weirdness." The Toronto Star, March 26, 2005, Sec. H, p. 1 and 12.
