= Bert Samples =

American visual artist

- Born: 1955 (age 70–71); Houston, Texas
- Education: Texas Southern University, University of Houston

Bertram "Bert" E. Samples (born Houston, Texas, 1955) is a contemporary American artist who works in various visual art media, including charcoal, graphite, acrylic, pen and ink, brush and ink, installation art, and public murals. His art incorporates imagery inspired by dreams, myth, movies, music, and potent magic. He is one of the founders of Project Row Houses.

== Early life and education ==
Samples was born in Houston, Texas, in 1955, and attended Jesse H. Jones High School (now Jones Futures Academy) in the South Park neighborhood. He enrolled at Texas Southern University (TSU), studying under legendary muralist Dr. John T. Biggers, and completed his Bachelor of Fine Arts in 1978. After attending TSU, he studied with Kermit Oliver. Samples went on to pursue graduate studies at the University of Houston, learning from artists including James Surls and John Alexander and earning his Master of Fine Arts in 1985. From 1987 to 1989, he received an independent study fellowship through the Core Residency Program at the Glassell School of Art, part of the Museum of Fine Arts, Houston.

== Work ==
Samples is one of the seven co-founders of Project Row Houses, a historic, community-based arts and social impact organization in Third Ward, Houston. The co-founders raised money to buy 22 shotgun houses and renovate them for artists' residencies and community use. The project later expanded to include low-to-moderate income duplex residencies and local social programs.

Samples also co-founded the Union of Independent Artists (UIA) with Rick Lowe. Intended to prevent exploitation of artists, the union had 350 members at its high point in 1990.

While a student at TSU, Samples contributed to the university's famous murals, completing the mural My Life After the Death of My Mother on the first floor of Hannah Hall in 1977. The work depicts Samples sleeping on his desk following the death of his mother, exploring memory and dream symbolism. Samples' senior notebook includes his written philosophy of art and photographs of his works, including the mural. Senior notebooks were created as part of the TSU art curriculum under Dr. John T. Biggers and Professor Carroll Harris Simms.

Outside of his artistic practice, Samples has worked at the Museum of Fine Arts, Houston, first as a preparator and then as a conservation technician. His conservation work began during preparation for the museum's 1995 retrospective The Art of John Biggers: View from the Upper Room.

== Selected collections ==
- The City of Houston Civic Art Collection, Houston Airports System (HAS) Collection
- The City of Houston Civic Art Collection, General Services Department (GSD) Collection
- Museum of Fine Arts, Houston
- The University Museum at Texas Southern
- University of Houston Public Art Program
