= William Cordova =

Interdisciplinary artist

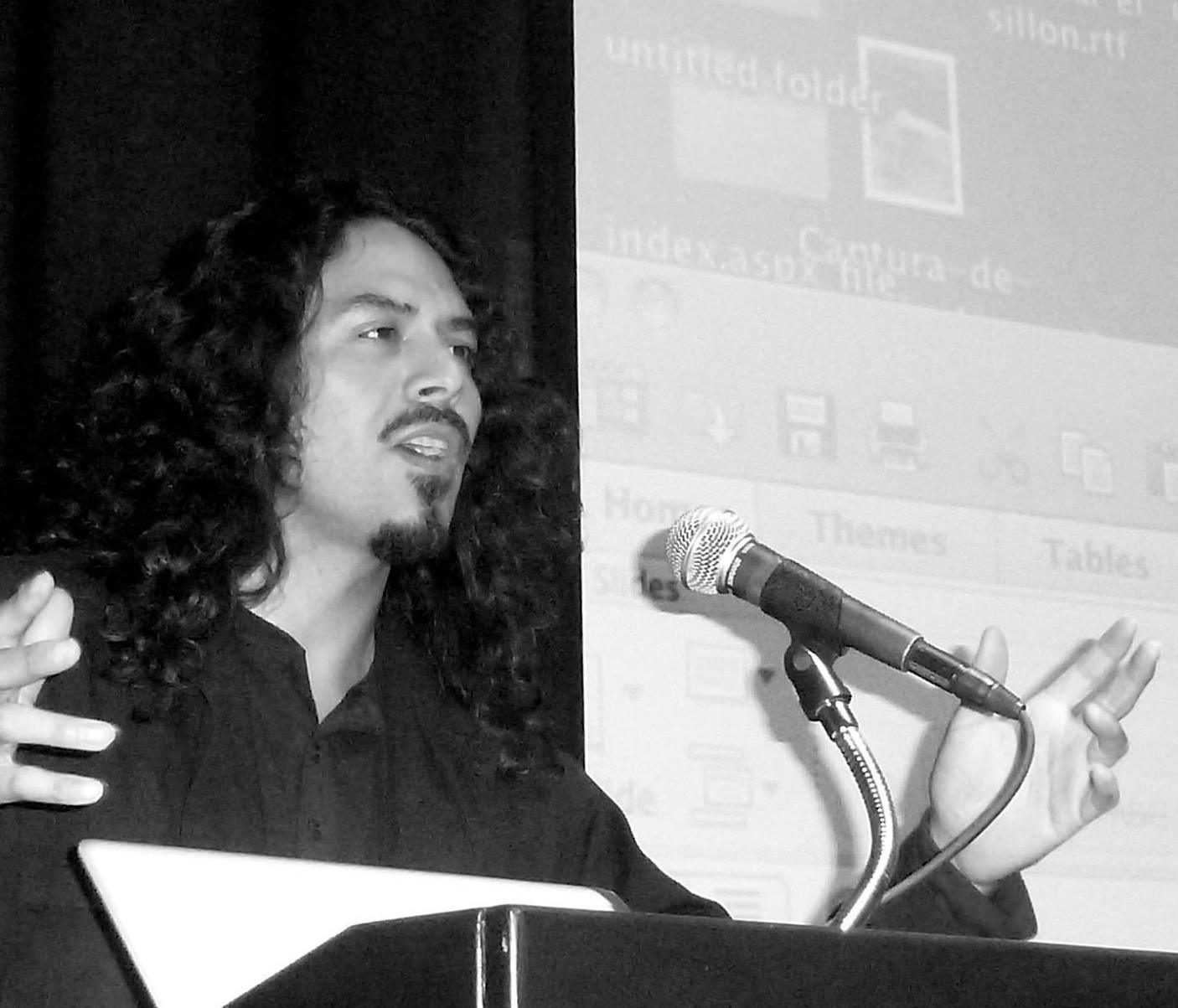
- Born: 1971 (age 54–55); Pueblo Libre (Lima), Peru
- Education: MFA, Yale School of Art; BFA, School of the Art Institute of Chicago; Miami Central High School

William Cordova (born 1969) is a contemporary cultural practitioner and interdisciplinary artist currently residing between Lima, Peru; North Miami Beach, Florida; and New York.

== Education ==
William Cordova received a B.F.A. degree from The School of the Art Institute of Chicago in 1996 and later received an M.F.A. degree from Yale University in 2004. He graduated from Miami Central High School in 1988 and studied Visual Art at Miami Dade Community College (North Campus) from 1991 to 1994.

Currently, William Cordova is in the School of the Art faculty at Columbia University, New York.

== Career ==
William Cordova has been an artist in residence at The Studio Museum in Harlem, the American Academy in Berlin, Germany, Museum of Fine Art in Houston's CORE program, Headlands Center for the Arts, Artpace, Skowhegan School of Painting & Sculpture, Lower Manhattan Cultural Council among others. He has exhibited in the US, Latin America, Europe and Asia.

=== Group exhibitions ===
Cordova was represented in the 2008 Whitney Biennial, 2010 Museum of Modern Art/PS1 Greater New York exhibition, an overview presentation of contemporary artists whose contributions to the arts have had a significant influence in society. In 2011, Cordova was invited for his first one person museum exhibition in Europe, yawar mallku: royalty, abductions y exiles at La Conservera, Murcia, Spain and also awarded the Joan Mitchell Foundation Grant. Cordova was included in Prospect.3 New Orleans Biennial in 2014 and the 12th Havana Biennial in 2015 at Casa de Africa, Havana, Cuba. In 2016 included: SITE Santa Fe Biennial, New Mexico, Southern Accents, Nasher Museum, Durham, NC. In 2017 Cordova was awarded the Michael Richards Artist Award by LMCC, NY and the Florida Prize by the Orlando Museum, Orlando, FL. In 2024 he exhibited in the Culture exhibition at the Ontario Art Gallery, Ontario, Canada and Avant-Garde, Museum moderner Kunst Stiftung Ludwig Wien, Vienna, Austria. In 2025, he had his first solo exhibition, 2 tienes santo pero no eres babalao, at the MALI Museum in Lima, Peru, and participated in Parallelos, Museo de Arte Contemporáneo, Universidad de Chile, Santiago, Chile.

=== Solo exhibitions ===
Solo exhibitions include kuntur: transmissions & portals, Illinois State University, IL and his first career survey exhibition, now’s the time: narratives of southern alchemy, Pérez Art Museum Miami, FL. Group shows include Pacha, Llaqta, Wasichay, Whitney Museum of American Art and the 13th Havana Biennial, Havana, Cuba 2019.

Cordova was co-curator of the Prizm Art Fair, focused on African Diaspora Artists, during 2017–2022.

In 2018, he was featured in an episode of Art21 alongside artist Kerry James Marshall. The artists were included in the contemporary art show Prospect.3: Notes for Now, in New Orleans.

In 2020, he founded the South Florida AIM Biennial. A statewide site-specific outdoor expo as a response to the COVID pandemic and to bring attention to Floridas environmental crisis. “I wanted to prod practitioners to be more resourceful, more improvisational, to not let them forget that they are creative problem solvers,” said Cordova.

Cordova co-curated and organized, along with artist Rick Lowe, The Greenwood Art Project in Tulsa, Oklahoma inviting Tulsans to creatively respond to the 1921 Greenwood Centennial. Cordova was the recipient of the 2021 Guggenheim Fellowship Award. In 2023 he was awarded a Creative Capital Grant.

== Collections ==
His work is in the public collection at the Whitney Museum of American Art, Guggenheim Museum, Walker Art Center, Harvard University, Yale University, Museo de Arte de Lima, Ellipse Foundation, Pérez Art Museum Miami, La Casa de las Americas in Havana, Cuba among others.

== Work and critical reception ==
"William Cordova's practice threads forward and back through time, tethering seemingly disparate relations to one another, and analyzing the echoes of history through the devices of their transmission. His work speaks to 'excluded discourses, silenced radicalisms, and insurgent practices' and with this, suggests relationships between these past moments and our own, given that what circulates in public knowledge is always already an unfinished portrait of a culture."

"William Cordova does not simply give up, but diligently or perhaps doggedly, uses fund materials to offer a conceptual map to global relations that has no natural beginning or end, no fixed borders, no national allegiances. He offers a micro-economy of signs that invites us to reflect on the macro-economies of history. His method is not strictly speaking a Foucauldian genealogy, but it shares a similar commitment to finding these uncommon histories, connections, and intersections frequently overlooked in the dominant discourse of government and school text books."

"Cordova has been preoccupied with issues of transformation and interpretation since his youth, owing partly to his own transitions between countries, economies, and languages. Having recently moved from Lima to Miami, the six-year-old found comfort in the sight of what he thought were familiar Peruvian cajón drums scattered on the streets, but which were in fact discarded speaker boxes. The hulking Badussy (or Machu Picchu after dark) (2004–05) dominates the gallery with some two hundred old speakers stacked to suggest a pre-Columbian monolith."

"Much of Cordova’s work induces similarly uncanny interpretive spirals, abetted not by arbitrary Surrealist juxtapositions but the all-too-common strangeness of our own detritus and the too-often repressed histories they conceal."

"William Cordova, who comes to us by the way of the Incas, Jimi Hendrix and Miami Bass and, for oppositional sake, MTV and Yale, too, now operates in this Harlem game as cultural manufacturer of multiple self-possessed signposts (sic), less ethnographic or geographic than steatopygic. Phat yes, like dub sound system speakers, but fully cognizant of the pluripotential pregnancy of the pause button, too. The pause for the cause that allows one to stop time and affirm."

"The act of reclaiming in Cordova's work is not about holding onto an old way, but of apprehending the lessons of the relationships that interacted and produced these objects. This apprehension leads to appreciation, an increase in the value of what is at hand. It is in this process of making familiar and sitting-with that social change is possible and Cordova's attempts at sparking those conversations is to be lauded."

"In trying to navigate a complex, interconnected web of meaning, these open-ended works connect these particular histories to the personal histories of each viewer. The introductory text to the exhibition suggests that such a conceptual practice “may ultimately lead to social change, which only happens when we change our perspective.” While small and seemingly open-ended, Cordova’s exhibition provides a platform for social change, one that is more capable than other, more traditional curatorial models."

"This sense of duality or even multiplicity of reading is a critical component of Cordova’s work, which he frequently creates by using puns and double meanings in both his titles and images."

"He wants us to slow ourselves below a blur, so that we might again see people appear in our blind spots. He wants us to question lost relations, to listen into the emptiness, to consider the unsung circuits of influence and ideas that have made our survival possible, to become enamored once again of the sights and sounds of our path-making, and of the mystery of our continuing. He wants us to think about the sovereignty of communities, a process that moves in its own time. Cordova had reached his thirties by the time his work began attracting critical attention. But he came to the art world the way he approaches his art—purposefully, methodically, attuned to his own cadence and tempo."

In a 2020 exhibition review for Artforum magazine, the New York-based art historian and critic Jan Avgikos wrote:

William Cordova is a storyteller—a recuperator of ancestral memories. The artist invites us to question how we might revisit belief systems that vanished eons ago. Themes that animate his installations, objects, and collages are intoned in the material dimensions of his work, along with undulating titles that refer to sound, occult secrets, warriors, ghosts, ancient architectures, folkloric music, textiles, and the landscape of Peru.

== Solo shows ==
Year	Location
2025	2 tienes santo pero no eres babalao, MALI, Lima, Peru
2024	can’t stop, won’t stop: geometria sagrada, Sikkema Jenkins, NY
2023	up against the wall, Rice University, Houston, TX
2023	este futuro es otro futuro, Livia Benavides 80M2, Lima, Peru
2020	on the lower frequencies I speak 4U, Sikkema Jenkins & Co. New York, NY
2018	now’s the time: alchemy of southern narratives, PAMM Museum, Miami, FL
2018	kuntur: sacred geometries, Illinois State University, IL
2017	ankaylli: spatial and ideological terrane, Marfa Contemporary, Marfa, TX chaka: ideological terraine, 80M2 Livia Benavides, Lima, Peru smoke signals: sculpting in time, Sikkema Jenkins. NY
2016	ceiba: reconsidering ephemeral spaces, Davidson College, Davison, NC
2015	yawar mallku: metaphysics of time and space, 80M2, Lima, Peru
2014	ceiba: ephemeral landscapes, MDC Museum of Art + Design, Miami, FL
2013	yawar mallku: temporal landscapes, Sikkema Jenkins & Co, New York, NY
2012	smoke signals: viviendo pa’ la ciudad, Yerba Buena Center for the Arts, SF, CA revisiting radicalism: Espacio Aglutinador, Havana, Cuba this one’s 4U (pa’ nosotros), Boston Center for the Arts, Boston, MA
2011	buscame en el torbellino: but also time itself, Saltworks Gallery, Atlanta, Georgia yawar malku, (royalty, abduction & exile) La Conservera, Murcia, Spain
2010	untitled (chincanas), LA><ART, Los Angeles, CA
2009	More Than Bilingual, Fleming Museum, University of Vermont, Burlington, VA laberintos, Sikkema Jenkins & Co. New York, NY
2007	Pachacuti (stand up next to a mountain) Arndt & Partner, Zurich
2006	P’alante, Arndt & Partner, Berlin, Germany Drylongso (Pichqa Suyo) PS.1 Contemporary Art Center, Long Island, NY

== Group shows ==
Year	Location
2025	Parallelos, Museo de Arte Contemporáneo, Universidad de Chile, Chile
2024	The Culture, Ontario Art Gallery, Toronto, Canada
2024	Avant-Garde, Museum moderner Kunst Stiftung Ludwig Wien, Vienna, Austria
2023	Unseen, Galerija Dots, Beograd, Serbia
2021	Black American Portraits, LA County Museum, LA
2020	A Very Anxious Feeling, Taumban Museum of Art, West Virginia Rituals of Regard and Recollection, Macalester College, St. Paul, MN The Southern Center for Contemporary Arts (SECCA), Winston-Salem, NC
2019	13th Havana Biennial, Havana, Cuba
2018	Pacha, Llaqta, Wasichay, Whitney Museum of American Art, NY
2017	Levanta el telon, Galeria Moises Perez de Albeniz, Madrid, Spain Florida Prize, Orlando Museum, FL Monarchs, Bemis Center for Contemporary Arts, Omaha, NE
2016	All Power to the People, Oakland Museum of California, CA Southern Accent, Nasher Museum, Durham, NC Site Santa Fe Biennial, Santa Fe, New Mexico
2015	MetaModern, Museum of Art, Champaign, IL
2014	Prospect.3 Biennial, Dillard University, New Orleans, LA
2013	Pop Politics, Activism at 33rpm, Centro de Arte Dox de Mayo, Madrid, Spain Hook, Line and Sinker: Contemporary Drawings, Nevada Museum, NV
2012	Now’s the Time, Guggenheim Museum, New York, NY The Storytellers, Stenerson Museum, Oslo, Norway It is What it Is. Or is it? Contemporary Museum of Art Houston, TX
2011	Arte al pas:Colecao de MALI, Pinacoteca de São Paulo, São Paulo, Brazil Halleluhwah! Hommage a CAN, Kunstlerhaus Bethanien GmbH, Berlin, Germany
2010	The Record, Nasher Museum, Duke University, Durham, North Carolina Greater New York, PS.1 Contemporary Art Center, Long Island, NY
2009	San Juan Triennial, Instituto de Cultura Puertorriqueña, San Juan, Puerto Rico
2008	Whitney Biannual, Whitney Museum, New York, NY Prague Triennial, Prague, Czech Republic Neo-HooDoo, Menil Collection, Houston, TX Street Level, Nasher Museum, Duke University, Durham, NC
2005	Scratch, The Studio Museum in Harlem, New York, NY
2003	Utopia Station, 50th Venice Biennale, Venice, Italy

== Awards ==
Year	Location
2023	Creative Capital
2021	Guggenheim Fellowship Award, New York, NY
2020	Oolite Arts Award, Miami, FL Art Matters Award, New York, NY Joan Mitchell Foundation Grant, NY
2017	Florida Prize in Contemporary Art, Orlando, FL Michael Richards Artist Grant, LMCC, New York, NY
2014	Knights Foundation Grant, Prospect.3 New Orleans, LA
2013	Guna S. Mudheim Visual Arts Fellow, Berlin, Germany
2011	Joan Mitchell Foundation Grant, New York, NY
2009	Art Matters Grant, New York, NY
2005	Rema Hort Mann Foundation, New York, NY New York Community Trust, New York, NY
2003	Yale Graduate Skowhegan Scholarship, New Haven, CT
2001	South Florida Cultural Consortium, Miami, FL
