= Kameelah Janan Rasheed =

American writer, educator and artist

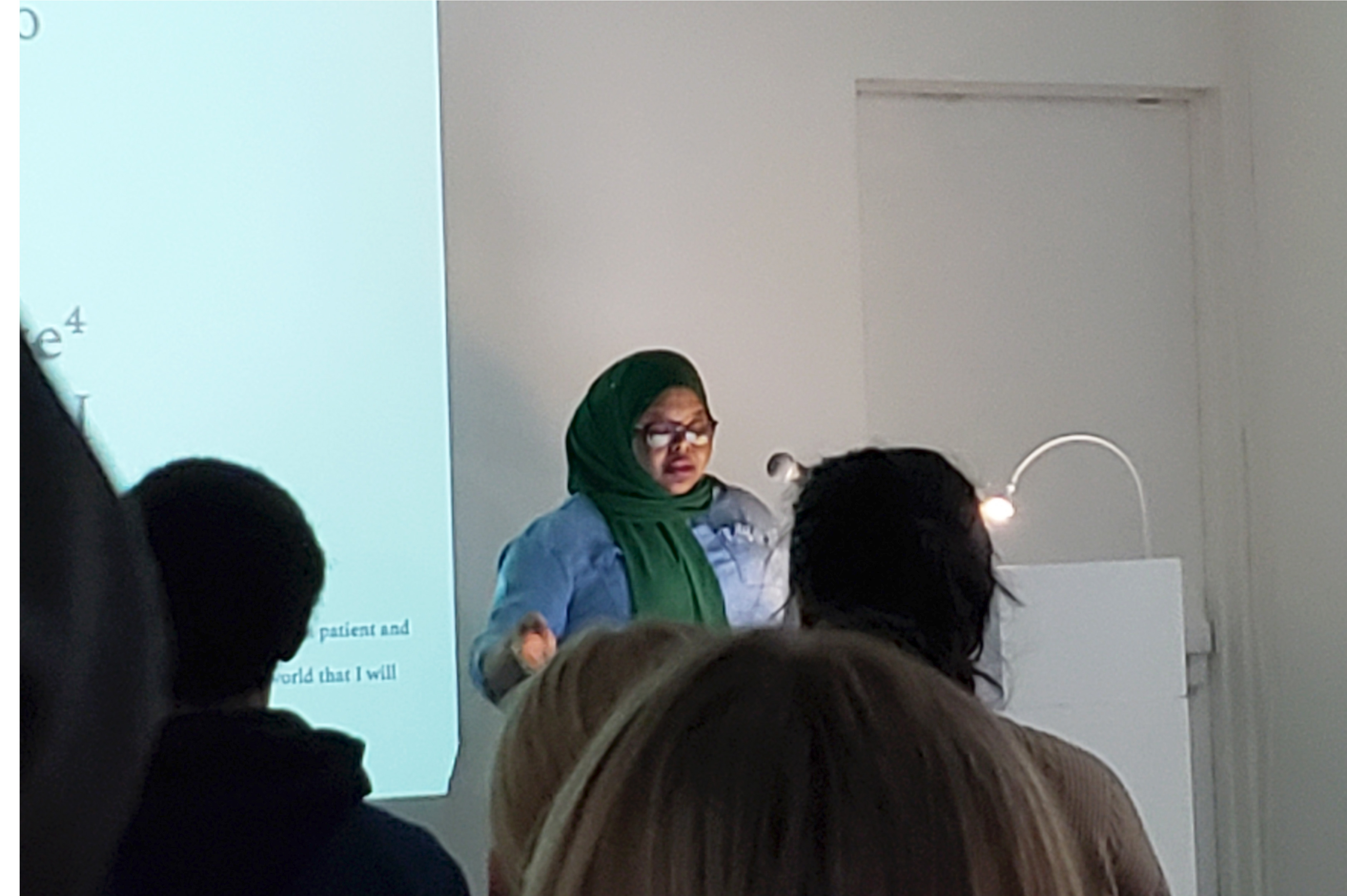
- Kameela Janan Rasheed giving a talk in the Jacob Lawrence Gallery at the University of Washington in Seattle.
- Born: 1985 (age 40–41); East Palo Alto, California, U.S.
- Known for: Contemporary Art, Writing, Education
- Notable work: How to Suffer Politely (And Other Etiquette), No Instructions for Assembly
- Website: www.kameelahr.com

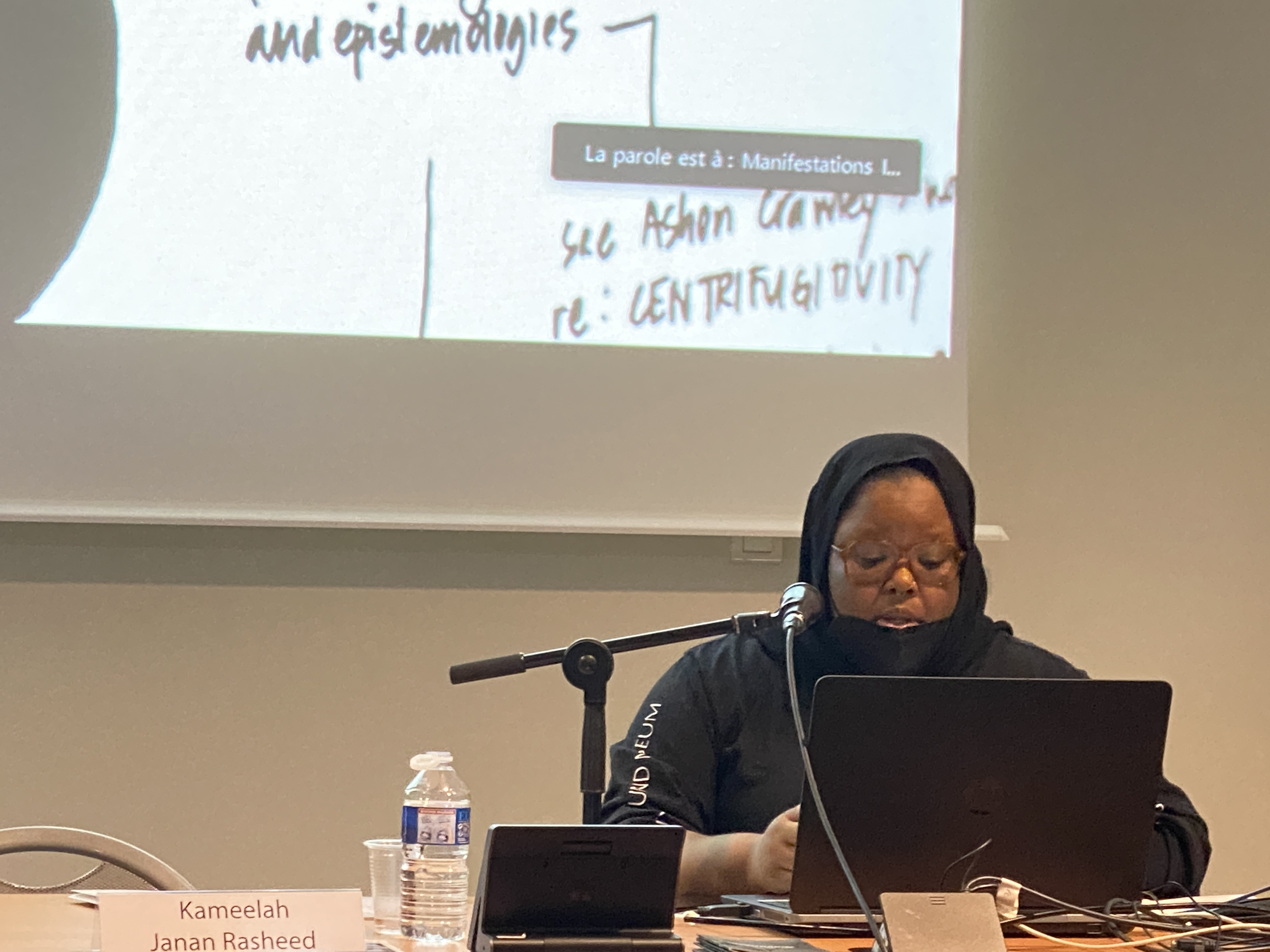
at the Institut National d´Histoire de l´art in Paris 2021

Kameelah Janan Rasheed (born 1985) is an American writer, educator, and artist. She is a 2021 Guggenheim Fellow in Fine Arts known for her work in installations, book arts, immersive text-based installations, large-scale public text pieces, publications, collage, and audio recordings. Rasheed's art explores memory, ritual, discursive regimes, historiography, and archival practices through the use of fragments and historical residue. Based in Brooklyn, NY, she is currently the Arts Editor for SPOOK magazine. In 2021 her work was featured in an Art 21 (New York Close Up) documentary, "The Edge of Legibility."

== Background ==
=== Early life ===
Born in East Palo Alto, California to Sunni Muslim parents, Rasheed characterizes herself as "a Muslim kid enrolled at a Catholic school and attended Mormon school dances, who went to shabbat dinners and attended Sunday church services with friends." When Rasheed was twelve years old, her family was unlawfully evicted from their home due to the sharp increase of land value in northern California near East Palo Alto, and entered a period of homelessness that lasted for the next ten years. The experience of moving through temporary homes with her family led to an interest in the practice of collecting and archiving to cope with her forced displacement.

Rasheed attended Pomona College for her undergraduate degree, studying public policy and Africana. She traces her interest in visual art to class on black aesthetics and the politics of representation taken in her penultimate semester at Pomona. She was awarded an Amy Biehl Fulbright Scholarship to study in South Africa. Returning to the U.S., she completed a graduate degree in secondary education from Stanford University. Early in her career, Rasheed taught social studies from the elementary school to high school level. Her background in history and pedagogy influences her artistic practice.

=== Visual art ===
Rasheed came to photography and collaging while living and studying in South Africa as an exchange student, and later as a Fulbright Scholar, where she discovered an interest in the act of documentation and interviewing. The first iteration of her immersive installation, No Instructions for Assembly, Activation I (2013), took place at Real Art Ways and consisted of over six hundred objects, including found and personal family photos, album covers, tufts of family members' hair, Islamic prayer rugs, newspaper clippings, jewelry, prayer beads, black stockings, and mirrors, among other items. Subsequent iterations of the installation have invited audiences to modify and contribute their own objects and histories to her growing archive.

== Themes ==
The major themes of Rasheed's work revolve around conflicting histories, visual culture, being black in America, unearthing buried narratives, and the complexity of memory. Her art engages with her background in history and education, turning exhibitions into pedagogical experiences and opportunities to explore archives, our personal relationship with history, and public spaces.

Rasheed's art has used distinctive signs with large, capitalized font in public spaces arranged in series or a grid. For instance, How to Suffer Politely (And Other Etiquette) is a series of billboard-size yellow posters with all-black font announcing slogans like "LOWER THE PITCH OF YOUR SUFFERING" or "TELL YOUR STRUGGLE WITH TRIUMPHANT HUMOR". The work engages with the Black Lives Matter movement, noting how people were told not to react with anger to police killing people of color in America, but also with etiquette guides from the 1800s. Similarly, Art After Trump is a political abecedarius with all-capitalized lines spelling out phrases like "SUPERLATIVE SUBJUGATION" and "PIGMENTED PRIVILEGE".

== Education ==
Rasheed holds an M.A. in Secondary Education from Stanford University and received a B.A. in 2006 from Pomona College in Public Policy and Africana Studies.

== Awards and fellowships ==
Rasheed has been the recipient of numerous grants, fellowships, and residencies, including:

2022

- Creative Capital Awardee

2021

- Guggenheim Fellow in Fine Arts

2016

- Artist-in-residence, Bronx Museum of Art Co-Lab Residency | New York, NY
- Artist-in-residence, Creative Exchange Lab - Portland Institute of Contemporary Art | Portland, OR
- Artist-in-residence, Smack Mellon | Brooklyn, NY
- Artist-in-residence, The Center for Afrofuturist Studies at Public Space One | Iowa City, IA
- Copy Shop Resident, Endless Editions at Robert Blackburn Printmaking Workshop | New York, NY
- Shortlisted, Visionary Award from the Tim Hetherington Trust | New York, NY
- Fellow, Ossian Fellowship - Jain Family Institute | New York, NY

2015

- Artist-in-residence, Lower East Side Print Shop | New York, NY
- Commissioned Artist/Scholar in Residence, Triple Canopy at New York Public Library Labs | New York, NY
- Grantee, Artadia: The Fund for Art and Dialogue | New York, NY
- Fellow, Artist Fellowship, AIR Gallery | Brooklyn, NY
- Fellow, Queens Museum – Jerome Foundation Fellowship Program, Queens Museum | Queens, NY
- Fellow, Artist in the Marketplace (AIM 35), Bronx Museum | Bronx, NY

2014

- Grantee, Art Matters Foundation | New York, NY
- Grantee, Rema Hort Mann Foundation Emerging Artist Grant | New York, NY
- Artist-in-residence, Working Classrooms | Albuquerque, NM
- Artist-in-residence, Vermont Studio Center | Johnson, VT

2013

- Fellow (Create Change Professional Development), The Laundromat Project | New York, NY
- Juror, Center for Photography at Woodstock A-I-R | Woodstock, NY
- Artist-in-residence, Center for Book Arts | New York, NY
- Artist-in-residence, Visual Artist Network - Real Art Ways | Hartford, CT
- Grantee, Visual Artist Network Community Fund - Real Art Ways | Hartford, CT

2012

- Awardee, STEP UP - Real Arts Ways | Hartford, CT
- Artist-in-residence, Center for Photography at Woodstock | Woodstock, New York

2006

- United States Fulbright Amy S. Biehl Scholar, U.S. Department of State | Johannesburg, South Africa

2005

- Harry S Truman Scholar, U.S. Department of State | Washington, D.C.
- Fellow, Rockefeller Brothers Fund | New York, NY

== Published Writing ==
As a writer, Rasheed has published an array of essays and interviews, including:

- No New Theories 2019
- "Black deaths matter: victims' humanity, not perfection, are the reason to mourn." The Guardian. February 12, 2016
- "Public Empathy Must Not Be Reserved Only for 'Perfect Victims'." Creative Time Reports. February 12, 2016
- “Carceral State: An Interview with Eric A. Stanley.” The New Inquiry. November 3, 2014
- “On Loneliness: A Reading List.” Longreads. August 16, 2014
- “Black Lives Worthy of Elaboration: A Conversation with Rachel Kaadzi Ghansah.” Gawker. June 7, 2014
- “A Conversation with Roxane Gay.” Specter Magazine. May 2, 2014
- “A Conversation with Daniel José Older.” Specter Magazine. April 2, 2014
- "All Things Considered": An Interview with Kiese Laymon.” Specter Magazine. December 2, 2013
- “’Beautifully Disturbing’: An Interview with Wendy C. Ortiz.” Specter Magazine. November 2, 2013
- “’Here's to the Weird": An Interview with Victor LaValle.’” Specter Magazine. September 2, 2013
- “A Vessel for Peace: An Interview with Writer Ocean Vuong.” Well & Often Press. February 2, 2013

== Selected exhibitions ==
Kameelah Janan Rasheed's work has been featured in exhibitions at galleries and institutions including solo shows at:

- A.I.R. Gallery, Brooklyn, USA On Refusal (2016)

Rasheed's work, Tell Your Struggle with Triumphant Humor, 2014 is included in the Exhibition For Freedoms, conceived as an artist-run super PAC, which is inspired by inspired by a speech by Franklin Roosevelt's 1941 Four Freedoms speech.

For Whisper or Shout: Artists in the Social Sphere, at BRIC House in Brooklyn in 2016, Rasheed showed a reconstruction of a childhood living room as part of the ongoing project her ongoing project No Instructions for Assembly.

She was featured in Art21's New York Closeup series in 2021, short-form online interviews that often revisited artists on multiple occasions.

Rasheed screened two videos on the Highline in 2026, Keeping Count, annotated (2021–23) and disorganize the spirit, i (2025).
