= Autumn Knight =

American artist (born 1980)

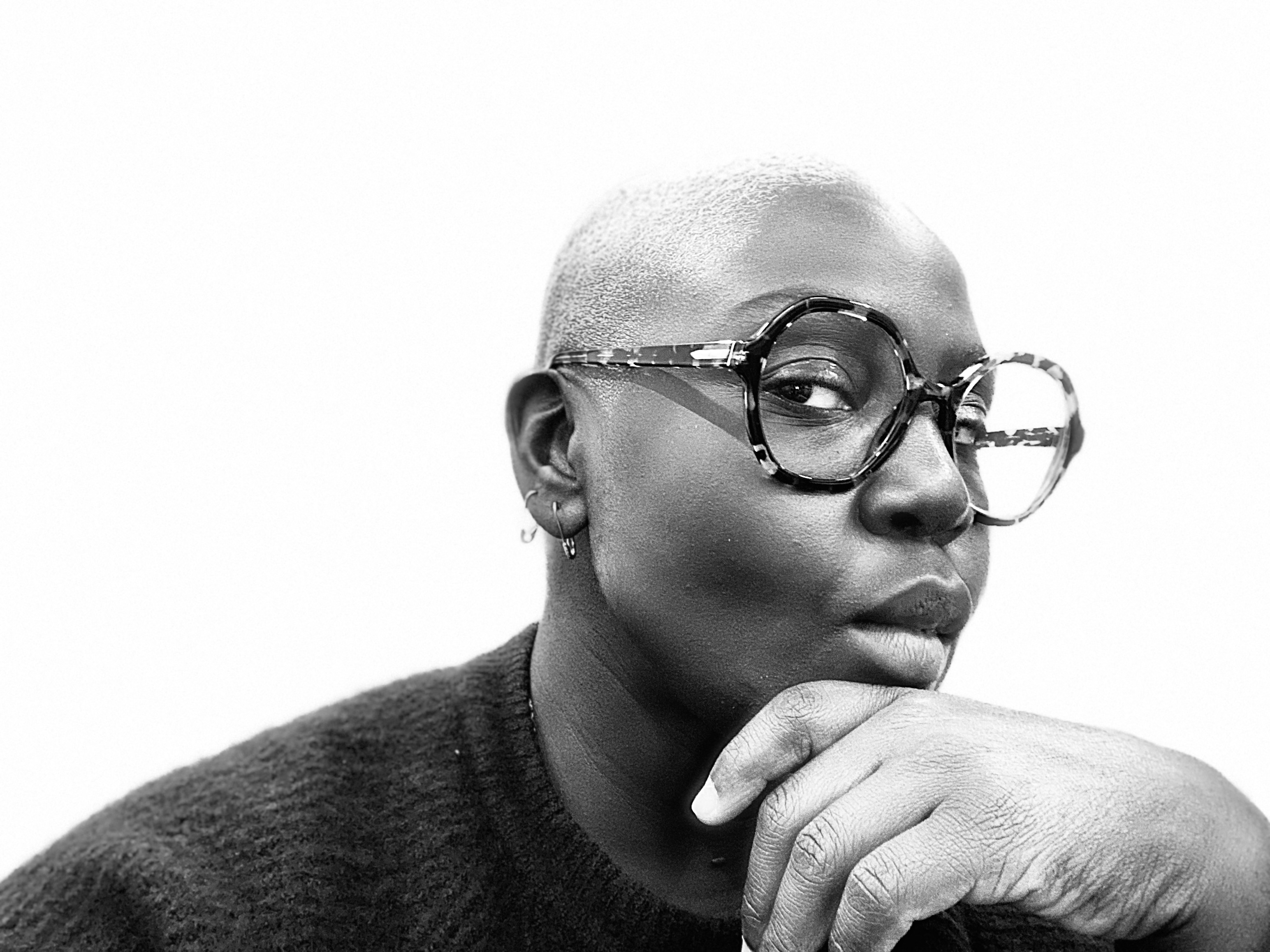
- Born: 1980 (age 45–46); Houston, Texas, USA
- Education: High School for the Performing and Visual Arts Major - Theatre; Dillard University BA - Theater; New York University MA - Drama Therapy
- Website: autumnjoiknight.com

Autumn Knight (born 1980) is an American interdisciplinary artist working with performance, installation, and text from Houston, Texas who lives and works in New York City.

== Early life and education ==
Knight attended the High School for Performing and Visual Arts in Houston, TX . She went on to achieve an M.A. in Drama Therapy, from New York University and a B.A. in Theatre Arts/Speech Communications from Dillard University. Knight holds certificates in Arts Management & Marketing from Birkbeck College in London, U.K. and in Speech & Drama from Central School of London.

== Career ==
=== Artistic practice ===
Knight is recognized for her performance pieces, which are influenced by her background training in therapy. Often, the works play off the social dynamics of her audiences, amplifying the race, gender, and power relationships in the room. Her work has been described as having an "absurd and comedic effect."

In Sanity TV at Portland Institute for Contemporary Art’s Time-Based Art Festival (TBA) in 2018, Knight performed the role of an "absurd host of a talk show," directing audience members to participate through prompts and interviews.

Knight was one of the artists who contributed to Solange's 33-minute music video to her album When I Get Home (2019). She is the winner of the 2021–22 Nancy B. Negley Rome Prize from the American Academy in Rome. Knight is also a recipient of a 2022 Guggenheim Fellowship in Film-Video.

=== Performances and exhibitions ===
Knight has been widely exhibited, including at institutions such as Marfa Contemporary (2018), DiverseWorks Artspace (2018), Contemporary Arts Museum Houston (2018), University of Illinois - Krannert Art Museum (2017), Art League Houston (2016), She Works Flexible (2016), The New Museum (2015), Blaffer Art Museum (2014), Skowhegan Space (2014), CounterCutrent (2014) with Lisa E. Harris and M'Kina Tapscott, Project Row Houses (2013), and Crystal Bridges Museum.

In 2019, Knight performed at Human Resources in Los Angeles, and was selected to be included in the 2019 Whitney Biennial, curated by Rujeko Hockley and Jane Panetta. As MF Problem with artist Robert Pruitt she is a performer in the 2019 CounterCurrent Festival.

In January 2020, Knight was part of Artpace's exhibit titled Visibilities: Intrepid Women of Artpace. Curated by Erin K. Murphy, Visibilities not only kicks off Artpace's 25th anniversary celebration, but also highlights past artists from their International Artist-in-Residency program, such as Knight who was a resident there in Spring of 2015. Knight's 2017 video entitled Meesh was part of Visibilities.

In July 2020, Knight created a two-hour performance series for The Kitchen in collaboration with artist Adebukola Bodunrin. The performance was streamed live over Twitch due to COVID-19 restrictions. The three segments of the performance explored intersectionality how these dynamics affect artists, institutions, and the art industry in general. In this performance, Knight is depicted being followed by multiple cameras, while the feed is interrupted with security camera footage from inside The Kitchen. She then proceeds to gradually tear down The Kitchen while also giving different speeches to the audience. Reviewer Madeline Seidel praised Knight's performance noting that her "...actions frame The Kitchen as a complex setting: the institutional space is simultaneously described as a 'cage' in which racial, gendered and classist power mechanisms are at play, yet it also provides a blank slate for her artistic exploration of these societal ills."

=== Residencies ===
- The Kitchen
- Pioneer Works
- Studio Museum of Harlem
- 2015-2016 - Dance Source Houston
- 2014 - In-Situ (U.K.)
- 2013-2014 - Galveston Artist Residency
- Millay Colony for the Arts (Austerlitz, NY)
- YICA (Yamaguchi, Japan)
- Artpace (San Antonio, TX.)
