= Bert Long Jr. =

Chef and artist from Houston (1940-2013)

- Born: 1940; Houston, TX
- Died: February 1, 2013 (aged 72–73)

Bert Long Jr. (1940–2013) was a chef, painter, photographer, sculptor, and a founder of Project Row Houses.

== Personal life and early career ==
Bert Long Jr., was born in 1940 in Fifth Ward, Houston, Texas. His mother worked as a maid, and his steelworker father died in a horrific workplace accident when Long was only three, leaving him to help out his mother as he could. His father, who worked at Sheffield Steel, died after falling into a vat of molten metal. Long helped provide care for his three younger siblings and as a child, picked cotton in the summer to help provide for the family. Long worked for the Houston Club when he was only twelve years old. He took his first art class at Wheatley High School (Houston) but was primarily self taught, spending many hours studying art books at the public library.

In 1959, at the age of 19, Long joined the Marines and served until 1964. That same year, he married his childhood neighbor Connie Kelly. They had three children. Before his career as a visual artist, Long was an elite, nationally known chef. He attended culinary school in Los Angeles and first worked as an executive chef in a fine-dining chain before opening his own restaurant "Big Bert’s" in Oregon. Afterward, he returned to California to work as executive Sous-chef at the MGM Grand Las Vegas. The Longs moved to Rome after Long won the Rome Prize and later moved to Spain. Connie was diagnosed with lung cancer in 1997 and died in 1998 shortly after the couple moved back to Texas. Long visited Scottish-born artist Joan Batson in 1998, and in 1999, they returned to Houston where they shared a home until the time of Long's death.

Long died from pancreatic cancer on February 1, 2013, at the age of 72. Just prior to his death, he married Batson, with whom he had shared a home and a life for over 15 years.

== Career as a visual artist ==
Long's first exhibition was at the art gallery at the MGM Grand where he worked as an executive sous chef, and the experience inspired a major career change. It was 1975, and Long was in his mid thirties, when he decided to devote himself to a career as a visual artist. He packed up his family and traveled to art fairs across the western United States. In 1976, Long landed a job at the Ritz-Carlton in Chicago and enjoyed some artistic success in Chicago, including a showing at the DuSable Museum of African American History. His wife Connie Kelly Long stayed only one month before returning to Houston and its warmer climate. Long stayed on another 10 months before returning to Houston.

In Houston, Long began to achieve recognition. He attracted the attention of Houston's art community including director of the Contemporary Arts Museum Houston, Jim Harithas, and artists John Alexander, Salvatore Scarpitta and James Surls.

Long believed that art could heal the dark side of humanity's soul. He was a painter, photographer, and sculptor who worked with traditional materials but also with ice. Long showed at the Contemporary Arts Museum Houston (CAMH) and the Museum of Fine Arts, Houston (MFAH) as well as museum and galleries across the United States and in Europe. Long was included in the important group show Fresh Paint at MFAH in 1985 and was awarded an National Endowment for the Arts grant in 1987. In 1990, he won the Prix de Rome, which included a one-year residency. In 2006, Surls curated Long's MFAH solo show Out of the life of Burt Long Jr., which featured one of Long's best known painting's Ride the Tiger (2002), in which Long portrays himself riding a tiger naked except for oversized, heavy glasses.

His large, public works include an approximately seven by thirty foot mural at the Looscan Neighborhood Library and a sculptural work called Field Of Visions that was installed on the Project Row Houses campus. The Looscan mural Art/Life (2008) references seventeen masterpieces, including those of Rembrandt and Da Vinci, and depicts a self portrait of Long steering a ship sailing towards the horizon over turbulent, shark-filled waters. The mural is acrylic on canvas and is framed in one of the custom, sculptural frames for which Long is known. According to Long, it represents various periods in art history, "the theme is the traversing of art and life" and sharks represent, "the trials and tribulations of artists."

The Bert Long Jr. Papers are located at the University of Houston Special Collections, and Houston Museum of African American Culture (HMAAC) has a gallery dedicated in his name that displays the work of four Houston artists annually. Long's work is held in the collection of The Museum of Fine Arts, Houston.
