= John T. Biggers =

African-American muralist (1924–2001)

- Biggers in 1964
- Born: John Thomas Biggers; April 13, 1924; Gastonia, North Carolina, U.S.
- Died: January 25, 2001 (aged 76)
- Education: Lincoln Academy (Kings Mountain, North Carolina); Hampton Institute; Pennsylvania State University
- Movement: Young Negro Art
- Awards: Piper Professor Award (1964); Harbinson Award for Distinguished Teaching (1968)

John Thomas Biggers (April 13, 1924 – January 25, 2001) was an African-American muralist who came to prominence after the Harlem Renaissance and toward the end of World War II. Biggers created works critical of racial and economic injustice. He also served as the founding chairman of the art department at Houston's Texas State University for Negroes (now Texas Southern University), a historically black college.

== Early life and education ==
Biggers was born in a shotgun house built by his father in Gastonia, North Carolina. His father Paul was a Baptist preacher, farmer, shoemaker, schoolteacher, and principal of a three-room school. His mother Cora was a housekeeper for white families. As the youngest of seven, Biggers was reared in a close family that valued creativity and education.

When Bigger's father died in 1937, his mother took a job in an orphanage for Black children. His mother also sent John and his brother Joe to Lincoln Academy, an American Missionary Association school for African-American children in Kings Mountain, North Carolina.

After graduating from Lincoln, Biggers attended Hampton Institute (now Hampton University), a historically black college. Biggers planned to become a plumber (his Hampton application included boiler room drawings). His life took a dramatic change of course when he took an art class with Viktor Lowenfeld, a Jewish refugee who in 1939 had fled from Nazi persecution in Austria before World War II. Lowenfield introduced his students to works by African Americans and helped them understand the religious and social context of African art, of which the Hampton Museum had a significant collection.

Afterward, Biggers began to study art. At Hampton, Biggers also studied under African-American painter Charles White and sculptor Elizabeth Catlett. He also began to learn the work of Mexican muralists Jose Clemente Orozco, David Alfaro Siqueiros, and Diego Rivera; and American regionalists Grant Wood, Reginald Marsh, Thomas Hart Benton, and Harry Sternberg. He was exposed to and influenced by Harlem Renaissance artists William Artis and Hale Woodruf, and writers W. E. B. Du Bois and Alain Locke.

In 1943, Biggers was drafted and joined the U.S. Navy, which was segregated, like the other armed services. He remained stationed at the Hampton Institute and made models of military equipment for training purposes. In that same year, his talents were recognized when his work was included in a landmark exhibit Young Negro Art at the Museum of Modern Art in New York. Biggers was discharged in 1945.

== Education and career ==
In 1946, Biggers enrolled at Pennsylvania State University when Lowenfeld persuaded him to follow. He earned bachelor's and master's degrees in art education in 1948. In that same year, he married Hazel Hales. He earned a doctorate from Pennsylvania State in 1954. He was awarded an honorary doctor of letters degree from Hampton University in 1990.

His works can be found at Hampton University in Hampton, Virginia, primarily in the campus library. The University Museum at Houston's Texas Southern University houses a collection of Biggers's works.

Biggers was hired to be founding chairman of the art department in 1949 at Houston's Texas State University for Negroes (now Texas Southern University). "Over the next thirty-four years Biggers trained the next generation of African American artists and teachers that form a vital part of Biggers's legacy."

In 1950, Biggers won first prize for his painting The Cradle at the annual exhibition at the Museum of Fine Arts in Houston. "Segregationist policies, however, allowed black visitors into the museum only on Thursdays, so he could not attend the show's opening."

From 1950 to 1956 Biggers painted four murals in African-American communities in Texas, the beginning of his work in murals. He painted many public murals in Houston and elsewhere, including two in 1991 for Winston-Salem State University in North Carolina. Most are still in place.

Biggers received a mural commission by the Young Women's Christian Association of Houston in 1952, for the Blue Triangle branch. Thinking of the YWCA as a place for African-American girls and women to be empowered, Biggers was inspired to draw from his mural for his doctoral thesis. His mural was titled The Contribution of the Negro Woman to American Life and Education. Biggers wanted the mural to represent the world of the girls and women who would see it.

It honors the sacrifices and endeavors of African American women on behalf of their families and communities, and human rights for women of all races. The mural was revolutionary, symbolizing the sociological, historical, and educational influences of heroic women.

== UNESCO fellowship ==
Biggers received a fellowship in 1957 from UNESCO, the United Nations Educational Scientific and Cultural Organization. With it, he was one of the first African-American artists to visit Africa. Under the auspices of UNESCO, he and his wife Hazel traveled to Ghana, Benin, Nigeria and Togo to study West African cultural traditions first-hand. Biggers described his trip to Ghana and Nigeria as a "positive shock" and as "the most significant of my life's experiences."

He adopted African design motifs and scenes of life from his travels as important elements of his subsequent work. Biggers returned to Africa again in 1969, 1984 and 1987. In a 1975 Houston Oral History Project interview, Biggers spoke of his experiences. "We spent most of our time in the country. People call it "bush," you know, that's a name sort of like the hunter. I don't care for that name for the country people because country people have a great traditional culture. And these cultures are all over the country. They are beautiful. They have endured."

Biggers credits Lowenfeld with influencing his artistic development, giving him a larger perspective on the anguish that people have suffered because of race or religious beliefs. He died at age 76 in Houston.

== Career ==
Kumasi Market (1962)

When Biggers studied African myths and legends, he was particularly drawn to the creation stories of a matriarchal deistic system, contrasting with the patriarchal images of the European world. As his ideas and images of Africa melded with memories of his rural Southern life, his work became more geometric, stylized and symbolic. He used quilt-like geometric patterning as a unifying element of his work and made his colors richer and lighter. In later years, Biggers shifted from creating works that were overtly critical of racial and economic injustice (Victim of the City Streets #2, 1946) to more allegorical works (Birth from the Sea, 1964 and Shotguns: Third Ward, 1987).

Robert Farris Thompson notes how Biggers gives iconic treatment to household items associated with everyday domestic life. For instance, he portrays the shotgun house as a symbol of collective dignity and cultural identity. The recurring symbol of the simple shotgun with a woman standing on the porch can be interpreted not only as the simplest type of housing but also as a reference to women, through whom all creation comes. He uses a repeated triangular roof shape similar to pieces of a quilt, a reference to making a beautiful whole cloth from many irregular pieces, as another symbol of the creative force.

In 1994, Biggers illustrated Maya Angelou's poem "Our Grandmothers".

In 1995, the Museum of Fine Arts, Houston hosted a retrospective exhibition of Biggers's work titled The Art of John Biggers: View from the Upper Room. The show also traveled to Boston, Hartford, Connecticut, and Raleigh, North Carolina. "He is someone who has retained, over 50 years, an emphasis on African-American culture," said Alvia J. Wardlaw, curator of the exhibition, a recognized author on African American Art, and professor and curator of Texas Southern University's Museum. The catalogue Wardlaw created for the retrospective, The Art of John Biggers: View from the Upper Room (published by Harry N. Abrams in 1995), includes a broad selection of Biggers's paintings, drawings, prints, and sculptures.

In 1996 Biggers was invited to create the original design for the Celebration of Life mural in North Minneapolis, a predominantly African-American community. The mural was completed by a number of local Minnesota artists, including a few of considerable reputation such as Seitu Jones and Ta-coumba Aiken. Due to the creation of a new housing development, the mural was taken down in 2001.

In 2016, The Mint Museum in Charlotte, N.C., opened a multi-year exhibit John Biggers: Wheels in Wheels, which includes 12 important paintings, drawings and prints, as well as a rare example of the artist's sculpture. "Through the use of a rich symbolic language and beautiful craftsmanship, Biggers found connections between personal, familial, and regional histories, traditions, symbols, which he wove together to articulate broader cultural and historical concerns," the exhibit promotion stated. Themes that repeat throughout his career - the importance of women, family and triumph over adversity - are evident in the works on display.

== Auction records ==
On October 8, 2009, Swann Galleries set an auction record for any work by Biggers when they sold the painting Shotguns (1987), acrylic and oil on canvas, for $216,000 in a sale of African-American fine art. A stellar representation of the shotgun-style houses found in Southern black communities, the painting had been widely exhibited and was considered a culmination of Biggers's work. It had remained in a private collection since being acquired directly from the artist in 1987.

Biggers's papers, including correspondence, photographs, printed materials, professional materials, subject files, writings, and audiovisual materials documenting his work as an artist and educator are located at Emory University's Manuscript, Archives, and Rare Book Library in Atlanta, Georgia. His works are in such collections as noted below.

== Selected collections ==
- Minneapolis Institute of Art, Minneapolis, MN
- Williams College Museum of Art, WCMA, Williamstown, MA
- Hampton University, Hampton, VA
- The University Museum at Texas Southern University, Houston, TX
- Art Museum of Southeast Texas, Beaumont, TX
- National Museum of African American History and Culture, Washington, D.C.
- The Legacy Museum, Montgomery, Alabama

== Bibliography ==
- Biggers, John Thomas. Ananse: The Web of Life in Africa, University of Texas Press, 1962
