= Houston Alternative Art =

The Houston Alternative Art chronology was originally compiled by Caroline Huber and The Art Guys for the exhibition catalogue No Zoning: Artists Engage Houston, which was published by the Contemporary Arts Museum Houston (CAMH) to accompany the group show of the same name. The exhibition was on view at CAMH from May 9-October 4, 2009. No Zoning: Artists Engage Houston was co-curated by Toby Kamps and Meredith Goldsmith and featured projects by twenty-one Houston artists using the city as inspiration, material, and site. This chronology documents Houston's alternative art scene.

== Before 1970 ==
=== 1930 ===
==== Houston Artists’ Gallery ====
Grace Spaulding John and a group of women opened the city's first artist-run gallery, the Houston Artists’ Gallery, in the basement of the Beaconsfield Hotel on Main Street. The organization sponsored exhibitions, auctions, and lectures.

=== 1949 ===
==== Contemporary Arts Association ====
Notes: (Note: The building housing the Contemporary Arts Association (CAA) was from its inception often referred to as the Contemporary Arts Museum (CAM) and the latter name was used almost exclusively from the 1970s to 1990s. In 2002 the institution’s name was officially changed to the Contemporary Arts Museum Houston (CAMH).)

Houston artists and architects seeking a venue for displaying contemporary art and design founded the volunteer-operated Contemporary Arts Association, initially presenting exhibitions at the Museum of Fine Arts and in 1949 erecting an A-frame museum building on Dallas Street in downtown Houston. The organization gradually gained professional status and curator Jermayne MacAgy was hired as its first full-time director in 1955.

=== 1956 ===
==== The Orange Show ====
Postman Jeff McKissack began to single-handedly design and build The Orange Show, a brightly colored, carnival-like environment dedicated to the orange and to the virtues of good health and right living. He used concrete, stucco, and found objects—mosaic tiles, wrought iron fencing, wagon wheels, mannequins, and tractor seats—to transform two plots on Munger Street in the East End into a vividly painted architectural maze of walkways, balconies, exhibits, and performance stages. When The Orange Show finally opened to the public in 1979, the hordes of visitors McKissack anticipated did not come. He died shortly thereafter. The facility is now preserved by the Orange Show Center for Visionary Art and is the site for events and performances.

=== 1963 ===
==== Jim Love and Roy Fridge Studio ====
Artists Jim Love and Roy Fridge shared a studio in a two-story derelict storefront on Truxillo Street near West Alabama. It became a meeting place and notorious party site for artists such as Donald Barthelme, Jack Boynton, David McManaway, and Charles T. Williams, along with numerous Houston art patrons and international visitors such as Jean Tinguely and Niki de Saint Phalle.

=== 1968 ===
==== The Beer Can House ====
John Milkovisch, a retired railroad upholsterer, began to transform an ordinary bungalow in Houston's West End into a kinetic, shimmering environment. Working for twenty years, he covered the entire yard and drive with intricate patterns of concrete studded with marbles, salvaged industrial washers, and stones; decorated the house and trees with garlands made from beer can tops, rims, and pull tabs; and clad the house with thousands of flattened beer cans, ensuring that he would never have to paint the house again. The site is now a revered local monument maintained by the Orange Show Center for Visionary Art.

=== 1969 ===
==== Lee Benner ====
Lee Benner, opened his first studio on Wheeler St. Made sculpture for Coca-Cola, Bush Gardens, and Jockey's.

==== Daucus Carota ====
Herschel Berry, Michael Hollis, and Kelly Kirkonnel started Daucus Carota (Latin for “wild carrot”) while they were in high school. The group had a shifting membership that included Andy Feehan, Nicky Galmiche, Chris Lesikar, Jim Martin, and Julian Schnabel. Members of Daucus Carota used images and sculptures of carrots in their work, often leaving bunches of real carrots in their wake. They sculpted an oversized painted carrot, which they placed around town, including in front of the Museum of Fine Arts, in a gesture designed to belittle the art establishment.

==== Ant Farm ====
In 1968 in San Francisco, Chip Lord and Doug Michels founded the architecture and art collective Ant Farm, which later included Douglas Hurr, Hudson Marquez, and Curtis Schreier. In 1969 while Lord and Michels were teaching at the University of Houston College of Architecture, Ant Farm staged a series of free-form architectural performances in the Houston area. Subsequently, they worked throughout the United States, but realized some of their important projects in Houston, including Time Capsule 1972–1984 (1972); a monumental sculpture on Kirby Drive for the Hard Rock Café with an actual 1962 Thunderbird hardtop convertible towering aloft, STP (Save the Planets) (1985); and their award-winning project The House of the Century (1971–73), a futurist spaceship-like dwelling for Marilyn Oshman Lubetkin located near Angleton, Texas, south of Houston.

== 1970s ==
=== 1972 ===
==== Goodyear Blimp over CAM ====
During the opening of Exhibition 10, curated by Sebastian J. Adler at the Contemporary Arts Museum, artist and experimental filmmaker Michael Snow created an elaborate piece on the advertising light grid of the Goodyear Blimp, which flew over the museum.

==== Hyde Park Miniature Museum ====
D. D. Smalley, grandfather of artist and musician Frank Davis, was inspired by his grandson's birth in 1941 and began production of what was eventually called the Hyde Park Miniature Museum. On display in the oversized attic of a house on Hyde Park Street was a range of artifacts, including 250,000 postage stamps wrapped in bundles of 100, dinosaur excrement and bones, Indian skulls, tools, handmade models, over 1,000 clocks, the U.S. Constitution in Braille, wax recordings, a three-toed horse hoof, short wave radio paraphernalia, bee tracking glasses, dressed fleas, and many other curiosities and miscellany, all carefully arranged and catalogued.

==== B. E. & J. Holding Firm ====
Bob Camblin, Earl Staley, and Joe Tate, all university studio art teachers, used the chance operation of the I Ching to name their collaboration the “B. E. & J. Holding Firm.” In the backyard of their shared studio on Garrott Street, they built a large sculptural tower with a payphone on the third floor. It became a meeting place for many artists in the community, including Al Smith, David Folkman, Jack Boynton, and Mark Battista, a former architecture student from Rice University. Their collaboration resulted in three exhibitions at the University of St. Thomas.

=== 1973 ===
==== Re:Vision ====
In fall 1973 Ian Glennie, interim director of the Contemporary Arts Museum, organized an exhibition called Re:Vision, which included performances, concerts, films, and artworks. One of the projects was a site-based sound portrait of Houston by Robert Whitman, a New York artist known for his theater and technology works. Whitman assembled volunteers and assigned each participant a specific location on a map of Houston and a time to call in. When they reached Whitman, they talked about where they were and what they saw. Using a sound mixing board, Whitman then arranged recordings of the calls into a concert like sound piece that was broadcast live on Pacifica radio.

=== 1974 ===
==== West End Metal Houses ====
Note: (Note: The area informally known as the West End is bounded by Washington Avenue on the north, Memorial on the south, and Durham and Westcott to the east and west, incorporating more formal subdivisions such as Rice Military and Magnolia Grove.)

On Roy Street, a few blocks away from the Beer Can House and mirroring the vernacular metal warehouses scattered throughout the neighborhood, architects Eugene Aubry, Ian Glennie, and Hossein Oskouie designed the first residence using an industrial metal exterior. This residential type has since proliferated in the area (sometimes referred to as “Tin Town”) and throughout the city. Glennie and Fredericka Hunter of Texas Gallery were the original inhabitants of the loftlike space, and they presented the first Houston performances of composer Philip Glass and performance artist Joan Jonas in their home.

=== 1975 ===
==== The Menil Collection Campus ====
Facilitated by the lack of zoning in Houston, John and Dominique de Ménil discreetly began acquiring thirty acres of property adjacent to the University of St. Thomas, at first intended for potential university expansion. They later decided to build their museum there and to maintain the residential properties against the incursion of unwanted architecture and businesses. In 1974, under the direction of architect Howard Barnstone, the many bungalows comprising the neighborhood were all painted gray with white trim, inspired in part by Dominique de Menil's Rice Museum exhibition of grisaille painting Gray is the Color. This gray theme informed the look of the Renzo Piano–designed Menil Collection, which opened in June 1987 on part of the site where some houses had been demolished or moved. The remaining bungalows today are art administrative offices, arts spaces, and homes—a unique and homogeneous neighborhood-within-a-neighborhood.

=== 1976 ===
==== See Saw ====
As part of the Main Street Festival, artist Mel Chin created an earthwork called See Saw in Hermann Park with funds he raised from GeoSource, an oil company. Chin and GeoSource worked closely to build the work, which consisted of two 6-by-6-foot (1.8 by 1.8 m) “planter boxes” set 60 inches (1.5 m) apart and linked by a hydraulic system, so that they ascended and descended in opposition to each other when visitors stood on them.

=== 1977 ===
==== Mayhem at CAM ====
The Kilgore College Rangerettes, a renowned women's synchronized drill team dressed as miniskirted cowgirls, performed during the opening night of an exhibition at CAM organized by James Harithas featuring the work of Antoni Miralda, a sculptor whose medium is food and its attendant ceremonies. In a nod to the local Rainbow Bread Company, the artwork on view was an installation of bread dyed all the colors of the spectrum. Perhaps stirred by the high-kicking Rangerettes, the opening night crowd erupted in mayhem and tore the bread apart in a food fight that spilled into the streets.

==== SWAMP ====
A community-wide offshoot of the Rice University Media Center, the Southwest Alternate Media Project (SWAMP) was founded as a Texas-based nonprofit organization to promote the creation and appreciation of film, video, and new media, as well as, originally, to provide low-cost access to media production facilities.

=== 1978 ===
==== Christ Church Gallery ====
Artist Terrell James opened and operated a gallery for several years on the premises of the downtown Christ Church Cathedral, an Episcopal church founded in 1839.

==== Women's Caucus for Art ====
The Houston Women's Caucus for Art was founded as a regional chapter of the national Women's Caucus for Art, to actively support equal opportunity and visibility for work by women. Participants included MaryRoss Taylor, Gertrude Barnstone, Lynn Randolph, Toby Topek, Suzanne Bloom, and Roberta Graham Harris.

==== Ring II: The Embrace . . . Advanced to Fury ====
Terry Allen presented his music-theater piece The Ring in a full-scale wrestling ring erected in Spinoza, Inc., the industrial warehouse of Max Miller's railroad track company near Channelview. In the ring, a couple verbally recounted their relationship as a male and a female wrestler violently acted out their roles while random audience members stood and recited parts of the narrative. This was one of the first public performances of actress/performance artist Jo Harvey Allen.

=== 1979 ===
==== Urban Animals ====
The Urban Animals, a loose-knit group of street skaters, was formed by Edie Scott and Scott Prescott. Their activities included roller hockey, parking garage surfing, midnight crosstown skating, bar hopping, roller jousting, and graffiti art. At their zenith in the late 1980s, they numbered several hundred and included skating filmmakers, artists, mechanics, lawyers, electricians, topless dancers, bartenders, and even a Harris County deputy. The Animals became notorious among the press, city government, and local police, but the group's creative output was large and its charitable efforts at local shelters and community centers were generous.

==== The Red House ====
Placing a classified ad in the Houston Chronicle, artist Mel Ziegler offered to paint any house for free as long as the owner accepted his conditions that the entire edifice, inside and out, be painted boldly in red and left that way for three months. The house remained a compelling architectural quirk on Bomar Street in the Neartown area for fifteen years because the owners kept repainting the house as Ziegler had originally instructed. The structure still exists but is no longer painted red.

==== Square One ====
Mark Lombardi moved to Houston in 1975 to become an assistant curator under Director James Harithas at the Contemporary Arts Museum. In 1979 in an attempt to support himself and other local artists such as James Bettison, Ibsen Espada, Andy Feehan, and Andy Mann, he opened the gallery Square One on Bissonnet Street. Later in 1994, Lombardi began an art practice of tracking various political, energy, and military-industrial complex conspiracies on thousands of index cards, then mapping the connections on elaborate flow chart-like drawings.

==== 120 Portland ====
Michael Peranteau and artist Max Pruneda began monthly exhibitions of area artists at 120 Portland, a restaurant where Pruneda was chef. The openings were held on Sundays, when the restaurant was closed.

==== Lawndale Art and Performance Center ====
Lawndale Art and Performance Center (now Lawndale Art Center) began in a warehouse located on Hillman Street near Lawndale in the East End of Houston after a fire displaced the painting and sculpture department of the University of Houston. Under the direction of artist and sculpture professor James Surls with programming implemented independently from the university, the cavernous former cable factory grew into a freewheeling laboratory environment that served as classroom, studio, and exhibition and performance space for students and artists in the community. One of the earliest exhibitions was Pow Wow: Contemporary Artists & Models Ball, curated by Bert L. Long Jr., Miniatures Exhibition, an exhibition of work by over five hundred artists. Students at the original Lawndale Art Annex on Dismuke and Lawndale included: Sharon Kopriva, Ed Wilson, Jack Massing and Michael Galbreth (The Art Guys), Paul Kittleson, Kelly Alison, Bert Samples, Craig Lesser, Donald Redman, Mary Jenewein, Barbara Jones, Robert Shuttelsworth, Glen Gipps, Chuck Dugan, Wes Hicks, Judy Long, Jim Poag and Jeff Delude. In 1993, Lawndale moved to its current location on Main Street in the Museum District.

==== Smithsonian Archives of American Art ====
As part of a national initiative the Smithsonian Institution's Archives of American Art began a pilot project, the first privately funded archive documenting predominantly Texas artists. Later records from New Mexican artists were added. Originally scheduled to function for two years, it continued through 1985 because of the scale of the work. This southwestern archive was run from Houston by Sandra Curtis Levy, assisted by Terrell James. Liz Ward and Maggie Olvey also helped. A duplicate of this archive, which is part of the National Archives of American Art, is kept on microfilm at the Museum of Fine Arts, Houston.

== 1980s ==
1980
Studio One

William Steen founded Studio One in a storefront studio space he shared with Mel Chin on Congress Street in a derelict area east of downtown Houston. For several years, it was one of the most influential art spaces in the city. Art exhibitions, readings, lectures, films, and performances were staged there, including works by experimental punk band Culturcide, improvisational musician Richard Landry, avant-garde filmmaker Kurt Kren, The Art Guys, and actor/artist Dennis Hopper. Steen also became a liaison to various outsider and prison artists such as Henry Ray “Pretty Boy” Clark.

3221 Milam

Dancer and choreographer Farrell Dyde founded the alternative space 3221 Milam, which presented art exhibitions, performances, dance, and music.

Rock Extension

Artist Kate Ericson's Rock Extension was a row of rocks that extended from the front porch and down the walkway of a house in the Neartown area. Ericson went on to create several other important works in Houston in collaboration with her husband, Mel Ziegler.

The Fan Man

Bob Harper, the Fan Man, began to build an environment in the Third Ward that he called the “Third World.” He created pieces from items such as abandoned TVs, water skis, mannequins, bottles, and numerous electric fan blades. The project grew until it covered the house and yard. In 1992 the house burned down when a gas heater exploded; Harper's mother died from injuries sustained in the fire. The Fan Man then moved to a property owned by his brother and began to rebuild his environment, working on it until his death in 1995.

1981
DoV-Z ROBOTTs

After making a series of 16 sculptural radio-controlled robots (parabots), artist H. J. Bott staged eight biweekly robot performances in his studio in the Heights, which were highly attended (SRO) by local Houston artists, gallerists, collectors, curators and art writers. ROBOTT Opera: A Time- Warp Newscast, 1983, followed at the University of St Thomas, Houston, featuring 12 of the parabots in dialogue with three screens of art and news, a shaman (Shanabu), newscaster mimes (Walter Cranktight and Bonnie Warbler) and the omnipotent computer force of the Universe (Mother PCOF—Power, Control, Order) of the 23rd c A.C.W, (After the Corporate Wars) voice by Margaret (a.k.a. Dee Dee) Bott. ROBOTT voices were by gallerists, curators and a collector. Two of the DoV-Z ROBOTTs, Nadair (an Inter-galactic political consultant/historian) and ROWE ( a radiation analyst/bot-philosopher), were then included in a two-year 11 museum traveling exhibition, The History of Robotics initiated by the American Craft Museum, NYC. Each ROBOTT represents a different discipline, appearing thru a time-warp, warning of our environmental destructive and inhumane behaviors, and specific for a respective discipline; e.g., Egairt was a catastrophic event triage-bot, mimicking human attitudes, "I do not deal in patient plea bargaining." All performances were politically, highly charged scripts.

Dark Continence

William Steen was commissioned to create a performance in front of the downtown library. Called Dark Continence, the performance included projected imagery, elaborate scaffolding, and dancer Margaret Boswell with music by Culturcide.

Houston Center for Photography

The Houston Center for Photography was founded as a member-run cooperative and was eventually incorporated as a nonprofit visual arts organization devoted exclusively to photography and related media.

1982
McKee Street Bridge

The McKee Street Bridge, which spans Buffalo Bayou in the northeast corner of downtown Houston, was regularly trashed with vandalism and graffiti up until the early 1980s. Artist/environmentalist Kirk Farris and photographer Paul Judice created an exhibition called Bridges over Buffalo Bayou that appeared at the Houston Public Library’s downtown branch. Farris then acquired donations of paint and lighting supplies, as well as approval from the City of Houston, and went on to single-handedly revitalize the bridge. He continued the project with the acquisition of nearby property and added park space, which has become a source of civic pride.

The Orange Show Re-Opening

The Orange Show re-opened to the public after its restoration by the Orange Show Foundation (now the Orange Show Center for Visionary Art). In 1983 the Orange Show Foundation began its stewardship of other visionary art sites and programming inspired by these sites.

Kuumba House

South African native Lindi Yeni founded Kuumba House to create, teach, perform, and preserve African art forms of dance, theater, music, and other creative expressions.

Midtown Art Center

The Midtown Art Center was founded at LaBranch and Holman Streets in 1982 as a multidisciplinary arts complex with music, visual art, performance, and literary programs. It continues as a community outreach organization.

Core Program of the Glassell School

A postgraduate fellowship program was founded at the Glassell School of Art at the Museum of Fine Arts, Houston under the direction of sculptor Allan Hacklin. It continues to thrive today providing recipients with studio space, facility use, a stipend, seminars with visiting artists and scholars, and an annual exhibition. Numerous artists from the program have contributed to the development of the Houston art scene and continue to reside in the city.

Center for Art and Performance

In 1982, Michael Peranteau and artist Max Pruneda founded the Center for Art and Performance (CAP), a gallery/alternative art space on Almeda Road where many local artists had their first exhibitions and performances. These artists include Terrell James, Kathleen Packlick, Jesus Moroles, John Peters a.k.a. Perry Webb a.k.a. Mark Flood, Beth Secor, among many others.

1983
DiverseWorks

Artist Charles Gallagher founded DiverseWorks in an historic Civil War-era armory and dry goods store on Travis Street in downtown Houston. It included studios and an artist-in-residence program with James Bettison, Billy Hassell, Doug Laguarda, Don Redmond, Lisa Schoyer, and Beth Secor as early participants. In 1989 a fire forced DiverseWorks to move to The Docks near the East Freeway, a warehouse complex where some artists also maintain studios privately. DiverseWorks Artspace continues as a vital laboratory where programming includes the visual, performing, and literary arts. In 2012, DiverseWorks moved to 4102 Fannin Street, in the heart of the Midtown Arts and Entertainment District, and within the Houston Museum District.

Dennis Hopper in Houston

In May at Studio One, William Steen presented Paintings and Assemblages by Dennis Hopper, with a related screening at the Rice University Media Center of a film (Out of the Blue, 1980, directed by and starring Hopper) involving a school bus accident. The entire audience was then transported via school buses to the Big H Speedway stock car race track for the “Russian Dynamite Death Chair Act.” In the infield, Hopper sat in a chair rigged with six sticks of dynamite and safely blew himself up.

Consolidated Arts Warehouse

In the summer, artist Lee Benner renovated the old Consolidated Meats Warehouse on Montrose just south of the Highway 59 overpass. The first event, “Dance with Live Artists,” was a huge blowout with five bands, multiple happenings, and artwork on display. The venue remained open periodically for the next couple of years, catering to punk music and exhibitions of young artists in Houston's burgeoning art scene.

The Flower Man

Cleveland Turner found himself homeless and living on skid row until he had a vision in 1983 of a whirlwind that deposited colorful junk onto a long wall. Since then, he has transformed his homes in Houston's Third Ward with massive amounts of colorful debris, handmade sculptures, and flower gardens.

FotoFest

FotoFest was founded by photographers Fred Baldwin and Wendy Watriss and European gallery dealer Petra Benteler as the first international biennial of photography and related art in the U.S. In March 1986, FotoFest presented its first biennial of photography in sixty-four sites around Houston.

Firehouse Gallery

The Houston Women's Caucus for Art opened an exhibition space, the Firehouse Gallery, in former Houston Fire Station No. 16 on Westheimer Street in Neartown.

1984
Artists' Warehouse Alliance

Lee Benner, John Calaway and Sandra Joseph started AWA early in 1984. Artist were moving into the abandon warehouses north of downtown in large numbers. The first meeting over 50 artist came, the youngest artist there said "we should name ourselves The Cloud because we all had our heads in a cloud". AWA soon made a gallery in an unused space in the Jack Pearce Building. The artists in the first show were Bill Angert, Rusty Arena, Lee Benner, Jim Bril, Certer Burnette, Daniel Cilhoun, Patti Candelari, Mimi Davies, Robert Fain, Kirt Ferris, John Fournier. Bob Flowler, Bob Gotschall, Fred George, Allen Hacklin, Donna Hamiton, Bob Homes, Sandra Joseph, JIm Kronlage, Curtis Maddox, Martin, Jimmy Neon, Ginni Nickell, Mike Patrick, Jon Lucien Piccinin, RAZ, Edward Rodgers, Ruthie Russell, Bernard Sampson, Wayne Sheffield, John Steiger, John Swenson, Jim Wicker and C.W. Wood. By summer it was over, with the fun and shows came higher rents, most artists moved out. In 2010 there are still many artists in NO Ho.

Fruitmobile

The Orange Show Foundation commissioned artist Jackie Harris to create the Fruitmobile, a decorated art car that has become an enduring symbol for the form.

MotherDogStudios

MotherDogStudios was organized on Walnut Street on the eastern edge of downtown by artists Charlie Sartwelle and John Runnells to provide sixteen studio spaces for artists and present exhibitions in the Mother Dog Museum of Modern Art.

Benner Studios

Lee Benner moved his studio to Commerce St. in July 84. There was space for shows and parties like "Love Burns". Space was also rented to artists; Jim Bril, Jack Massing, Rick Lowe, Ed Wilson. A Halloween party next door in a vacant building started Commerce Street Artist Warehouse

Transco Tower Gallery

Transco Tower opened an exhibition space in its lobby, regularly showing artists from the city and region. It continues today as Williams Tower Gallery, curated by Sally Sprout.

1985
NAAO Conference

DiverseWorks hosted the National Association of Artists’ Organizations (NAAO) conference on April 24–27. Panels, lectures, and performance and video events with artists, curators, and arts administrators from across the United States occurred at a number of locations, including DiverseWorks, Lawndale Art and Performance Center, Square One, and Republic Bank. Joan Mondale gave the keynote address and Frank Hodsoll, Chairman of the National Endowment for the Arts, was a speaker. Events included the Performance Rodeo at Lawndale Art and Performance Center.

Speed Street

In 1981 Patrick Waugh began work on Speed Street, a teaser for an unrealized feature film on Houston's roller-skating gang the Urban Animals. Conceived and directed by Waugh, with production and art direction by Scott Prescott, the 18-minute 1985 film features gritty nighttime skating footage shot at daredevil speed, roller joustings, and a high-energy music soundtrack selected by punk rock radio DJ Marilyn Mock.

Commerce Street Artists’ Warehouse (CSAW)

Commerce Street Artists’ Warehouse, located in a warehouse on the far eastern edge of downtown, was founded as an inexpensive home and studio for Houston artists, with exhibition space and a large performance area. Despite ownership changes and internal leadership struggles, the facility served for over two decades as living and studio space for up to forty visual artists at a time, and housed many different communal galleries. Artists who have had studios at CSAW include Wes Hicks, Virgil Grotfeldt, Deborah Moore, Orson (Titus) Maquelani, Kevin Cunningham, John Calaway, Robert Campbell, Jack Massing, Rick Lowe, John Peters, James Bettison, Jim Pirtle, Nestor Topchy, Steve Wellman, Ken Adams, George Hixson, J Hugo Fat, Frank Anthony Porreco III, Rodney Elliott, Daniel Adame, Teresa O’Connor, Elaine Bradford, Ben DeSoto, Cynthia Cupach, Y. E. Torres (Yet), Betsy Odom, Jacqueline Rusca, Judith Huacuja, Mike Scranton, Brian Zievert, and I Love You Baby.

The Mule Men

The Mule Men were Jim Kanan and Steve Paulk, whose collaboration grew out of their shared construction company. Together they made several large-scale mobile works including Texan Mexan Drive-In and Paging Oral Roberts, which were part trailer home and part outdoor movie theater.

Fresh Paint

The exhibition Fresh Paint: The Houston School, curated by Barbara Rose and Susie Kalil, was presented at the Museum of Fine Arts, Houston. Sparking heated debate about inclusions versus exclusions and the true definition of the “Houston School,” the exhibition nevertheless was a watershed moment in the maturation of the Houston art scene.

1986
Architecture & Culture
The Fourth Ward

This exhibition featuring archival and contemporary photographs, architectural models, maps, sculpture, paintings, documentary videos, and oral histories about the historic neighborhood of Freedman's Town opened at DiverseWorks, co-sponsored by the City of Houston Archaeological and Historical Commission and the Greater Houston Preservation Alliance. Accompanying events included “A Celebration of the Churches” with gospel singing; Ed Hugetz and Brian Huberman's video Who Will Stand with the Fourth Ward, produced by SWAMP; a University of Houston College of Architecture design charette; and a roundtable discussion with architects V. Nia Dorian Becnel, William Neuhaus, and Renzo Piano, and community organizer Lenwood Johnson.

Rendez-Vous Houston

As part of the Sesquicentennial celebrations of Houston, the Houston Festival produced an outdoor concert/spectacle by French composer Jean Michel Jarre. Using the entire west side of downtown Houston as a skyline backdrop, the event included music, laser lights, and gigantic projected images on the buildings. An estimated 1.3 million people attended the event, making it one of the largest concerts in history up to that time.

New Music America 1986

The Houston Festival presented New Music America 1986 as part of the city's Sesquicentennial celebrations. The world's largest festival of experimental music, which showcased renowned musicians and artists working with sound, was inaugurated in New York at The Kitchen in 1980. It was presented yearly in different cities in the United States until 1990. The festival in Houston exploited the city's special qualities and spaces, including the Astrodome, the tunnel system of downtown, various office lobbies, a YWCA pool, and incoming airline flights.

New Music Parade

New Music Parade by New York musician/composer Tom Cora, noted for his improvisational work in jazz and rock, launched New Music America 1986 in Houston. Cora collaborated with local artists Trish Herrera and Rachel Hecker on the organization of the parade, which included a hodge-podge of Houston's art community, including the Urban Animals, sculptural cars by Jackie Harris and Paul Kittelson, belly dancers, and more. The New Music Parade proceeded south on Montrose to the Museum of Fine Arts, Houston sculpture garden, which opened that same day with an event featuring the world premiere of John Cage's “Ryoanji.” Inspired by the success of the New Music Parade, The Orange Show organized the first Art Car Parade in 1988.

Stegosaurus by Paul Kittelson

DiverseWorks sponsored public artworks placed throughout Houston. Paul Kittelson received one of these modest $500 grants and created his Stegosaurus, a life-size dinosaur made of foam cushions over a metal armature, which he installed under the Highway 59 overpass (later demolished) at Montrose Boulevard. The sculpture became a public phenomenon during its nine-month installation. It met its demise when it was set on fire by anonymous arsonists.

On Waugh Gallery

Artist Ted Brown, with Karen Poltarek, and Rick Sargent, who were co-owners, opened an exhibition space in a building at 1306 Waugh Drive. Later, Loretta Cooper became a partner. The space opened in 1984 and closed in 1989. The purpose of the gallery was to give a space for a new generation of artists to exhibit. Shows included works by such artists as Steve Brudniak, Mary Long, Paul Kittelson, Robert Campbell, Ed Wilson, Frank Martin, Wes Hicks, Deborah Moore, Ken Adams, Rick Lowe, James Bettison, Jim Pirtle, Nestor Topchy, Paul Watson and Kevin Cunninghamand.

1987
The Artery

Artist Mark Larsen founded The Artery, an art and performance space that was part art school, part arboretum, and part center for political activism. Located in a house on Jackson Street in the Museum District, The Artery served a large group of Houston's artists, actors, musicians, and social activists before closing in 2013.

The Human Tour

Michael Galbreth dedicated the project The Human Tour: An Anthropomorphic Route through the City of Houston “to a more human city.” He created a human figure that was thirty-four and a half miles long, superimposing it over the streets of Houston to connect six disparate neighborhoods. He placed slow-scan video cameras and permanent markers at the figure's head, hands, and feet. The monitors receiving the video images, the project's working drawings, and its maps were installed at DiverseWorks.

Tar Babies

In April Los Angeles artist Michael McCall tarred telephone poles and switching boxes throughout Houston with his 9-inch-square (230 mm) Tar Baby paintings, which were mixed-media paintings on roofing tar paper.

Community Artists’ Collective

The organization was conceived by artists and art educators Michelle Barnes and Dr. Sarah Trotty (Texas Southern University) to assist African American artists with a special sensitivity to women artists. In 1989 its headquarters was established in midtown. The Collective has sponsored numerous exhibitions and educational programs, many aimed at making cultural experiences more accessible to inner-city youth.

Robbie Conal Posters

DiverseWorks brought Los Angeles artist Robbie Conal to Houston to install his posters of politicians and celebrities guerilla-style throughout the city, including images from his Men With No Lips and Women With Teeth series.

Houston Gorilla Girls

Inspired by the activities of the New York and Chicago Guerrilla Girls who offered a critique of male-dominated art world activities, a small group of steadfastly anonymous women artists formed the Houston Gorilla Girls. Dressed in gorilla masks and costumes to hide their identities and to foment a satirical counterpoint at art openings, they carried signs, targeted art events, and distributed handouts with statistics about the poor representation of women in the arts. DiverseWorks brought the Gorilla Girls to Houston where they mounted a major installation and never disclosed their identities.

Super Canvas

Patrick Media began its sponsorship of the Super Canvas Project in which a panel selected artists to design billboards, which were then produced and displayed throughout Houston. This project continued for a few years.

Watermelon Flats

Local artists banded together to organize their own temporary outdoor sculpture show called Watermelon Flats set along Buffalo Bayou in a location across from the Wortham Center, an area that was once an outdoor farmers’ market. Included in this inaugural exhibition were works by Paul Kittelson, Noah Edmundson, Jackie Harris, The Art Guys, Dean Ruck, Olin Calk, Carter Ernst, Ken Adams, Pati Airey, and Tim Glover. Watermelon Flats eventually became what is today Buffalo Bayou Art Park.

1988
That's Painting Productions

French-born conceptual artist Bernard Brunon began a high-concept art project in Houston that consisted of painting rooms, walls, or exteriors in a manner that was indistinguish-able from typically painted rooms, walls, or exteriors. He considers these “jobs” as his artwork and signs, dates, and catalogues his efforts.

Magnolia Grove Neighborhood

Painter Salle Werner Vaughn began to acquire neighboring bungalows and transform them into environments evocative of another time and place; the houses hovered somewhere between artwork and home. To create the neighborhood, Vaughn purchased her property in tandem with Hiram Butler, who bought the block adjacent to hers to build his gallery and sculpture garden, retaining one of the modest houses on the property for his home.

The Art Car Parade

In 1988 The Orange Show, in conjunction with the Houston International Festival, organized and presented the first Art Car Parade in downtown Houston as a tribute to the burgeoning phenomenon of “art cars.” The parade continues annually under the auspices of the Orange Show Center for Visionary Art and has become an internationally recognized focus of the art car movement.

1989
Buffalo Bayou Art Park

The Buffalo Bayou ArtPark was founded as a continuation of the Watermelon Flats show. Today it is an artist-run organization that features a constantly rotating collection of public art below the Sabine Street Bridge between Allen Parkway and Memorial Drive. Twenty to twenty-five works of art are displayed at the park at any one time.

Meaux's Bayou/ Zocalo/ TemplO

Nestor Topchy, Rick Lowe, and Dean Ruck moved to a six-acre site on Feagan Street in the West End to fashion one of the most energetic communal art projects in the city. The site included several living spaces, a theater, a communal kitchen, gardens, several warehouse spaces for studios, and an outdoor stage and canopy used as a drive-in movie theater for up to thirty-five cars. Many artists lived and worked there, including Jim Pirtle, Andy Mann, Michael Battey, Fritz Welch, Mario Perez, and Giles Lyon. Initially called Meaux's Bayou, Topchy changed the compound's name to Zocalo, and then to TemplO as it grew and transformed.

Rubber–An Art Mob

Begun by artists Wayne Gilbert, Kelly Alison, Bill Hailey and filmmaker Ramzy Telley, Rubber–An Art Mob mounted twenty-five to thirty exhibitions in Texas. For a few years, the group ran 101 Space, located near downtown, as their home base. Their projects included film, video, performance art, and visual and sculptural exhibitions.

Social Bodies

Social Bodies, a one-night exhibition of the work of John Peters, occupied two sites: Homage, a downtown club, and 3221 Milam. To serve as his stand-in at one site, Peters hired a male model, who signed his own eight-by-ten headshots as “John Peters.” On his new canvases, Peters sold advertising space by the square inch.

Aerosol Warfare

Graffiti artists GONZO247 and MERGE360 began to document on video what they were doing both legally and illegally. They established a pen pal system with graffiti artists in other cities, exchanging videos of their work. They then compiled these videos from all over the world under the name Aerosol Warfare to create a video magazine covering all aspects of emerging hip-hop culture; centered on graffiti, the magazine is now sold worldwide. In 1992 they established Houston's first “wall of fame,” a legal spot for artists to graffiti, which is still running today at Palmer and McKinney Streets. In 1994 Christian Azul and Christopher Karl "BeZerk One" joined Aerosol Warfare.

Art Guise World Headquarters

In 1989 The Art Guys renovated and moved into a nineteenth-century warehouse on the northern edge of Houston's Heights neighborhood. This became their studio as well as an alternative art space, where they presented and staged exhibitions and performances of their own work and the work of other artists. For more than fifteen years while at this location, The Art Guys Museum (its name changed frequently) was a Houston hot spot for unusual and sometimes seminal exhibitions, performances, and events.

True Artist Tales

Artist Scott Gilbert's comic strip appeared in The Public News, which was then Houston's leading alternative newspaper weekly, and later moved to The Houston Press. True Artist Tales began as a make-believe comic soap opera in which Gilbert sprinkled recognizable characters with pseudonyms to present a semi-fictitious rendering of the Houston art scene.

Primal Screen

Primal Screen: A Fake Art Movement, an exhibition organized by artist John Peters for Treebeard's Restaurant on Market Square, included work by Jane Addison, Jose Cipriano Aquirre, James Bettison, Mel Chin, Randy Cole, Jeff Cowie, Ramona Fabregas, Wes Hicks, John Kaiser, Jack Massing, Joel Orr, John Peters, and Santiago Pretence, with opening night music by Jim Pirtle.

== 1990s ==
1990
Project Houston

Organized by Deborah Brauer for DiverseWorks, Project Houston was a collaborative exhibition presenting designs for Houston's future by artists, architects, engineers, scientists, a choreographer, and a composer, working both individually and in teams. Held May 2–July 29, the exhibition addressed urban and sociological issues facing Houston, such as housing preservation and reuse, transportation, environmental responsibility, and urban revitalization. The collaborations were documented in a catalogue.

Summer Street Studios

Keith Hollingsworth, who lived and worked in a studio on Summer Street during the nineties, held annual Erotic Art Shows as well as other sporadic exhibitions and performances.

S.H.A.P.E. Protest Installation

After the 1989 shooting death of Ida Delaney at the hands of a drunk, off-duty police officer, Rick Lowe presented an exhibition in the playground of the S.H.A.P.E. Community Center as part of his Victims series. The exhibition featured life-size figures of painted plywood representing those killed by violence installed in a large-scale tableau.

West End Gallery

Artist Kathleen Packlick opened the West End Gallery on Blossom Street, occupying a small space adjacent to the West End Bike Shop.

1991
Favela in Houston

As part of its Landscapes public sculpture exhibition, DiverseWorks and the Houston International Festival commissioned a work by Japanese artist Tadashi Kawamata, known for his installations, or “displacements,” that construct chaotic architectural growths around existing aspects of the urban landscape. Kawamata created Favela in Houston, an elaborate series of rooms made from scrap lumber and installed along the banks of Buffalo Bayou.

Alchemy House

Dan Havel created Alchemy House from an existing bungalow on Blossom Street as part studio, part sculpture, and part performance space, with performances by Kelli Scott Kelley and sound design by William D. Kelley. It was a center of activity for many members of the art community in the months prior to its expected demolition.

1992
I Love You Baby

From 1992–present Rodney Chinelliott, Paul Kremer, Will Bentsen, and created artwork together, often on the same canvas. In 2002 the group began meeting regularly on Wednesday nights at CSAW and adopted the name I Love You Baby (ILYB) and inducted Chris Olivier (Bexar), and Dale Stewart as members. Many artists visited on a semi-regular and collaborated on paintings, sculptures, street art and conceptual projects. These artists include Mark Flood, Betsy Odom, Ed Goleman, Julie Boone, Seth Mittag, Kyle Henriks, Ralph Elliott and Jack Massing. ILYB's website iloveyoubaby.org acts as an archive of their work from 2003 to 2008.

Market Square Park

Soon after DiverseWorks began programming in its building next to Market Square, it initiated a plan for an artist-designed park. Participating in this landmark park project, one of the first artist-designed parks in the country, were Malou Flato, Paul Hester, Douglas Hollis, James Surls, and Richard Turner. They worked collaboratively to design the park in cooperation with the Houston Parks and Recreation Department. It was dedicated in 1992.

Don't GAG the Arts

The rally “Don’t GAG the Arts,” held in the park on the Menil campus to protest censorship of grants by the National Endowment for the Arts (NEA) and to support freedom of expression, drew a large and vocal crowd. The NEA had rescinded grants awarded to four artists, Karen Finley, John Fleck, Holly Hughes, and Tim Miller, because of their works’ provocative content. Rally speakers included Walter Hopps, Peter Marzio, Michael Peranteau, Tim Miller, and Paul Winkler. Artists made “Don’t Gag the Arts” posters, placards, and fans. The “NEA Four” took their case to the Supreme Court and in 1998 the Court upheld the grant awards.

1993
ARTCRAWL Houston

The "Crawl" was launched in 1992 by the Internationally acclaimed art team of Charlie Jean Sartwelle & John Runnels of Mother Dog studios. During this event the artists in the old downtown art/warehouse district open their doors to the public and they can meet and speak with the artists. The ArtCrawl is always held on the last Saturday before Thanksgiving.

Project Row Houses

Project Row Houses, conceived and founded by artist Rick Lowe together with a group of African American artists and community activists, rescued and rehabilitated a series of shotgun-style houses in Houston's Third Ward, one of the city's oldest African American communities. Installations, exhibitions, and performances were programmed in the houses, some of which also became a residential program for young, single mothers . The opening of Project Row Houses was preceded by the Drive-By Show, which invited artists to paint on the plywood temporarily covering the windows of the row houses facing Holman Street. Project Row Houses has grown from the original 23 shotgun houses on 2 blocks to about 50 buildings on 8 blocks. Project Row Houses is internationally recognized and Michael Kimmelman of the New York Times said that Project Row Houses "may be the most impressive and visionary public art project in the country." In 1999 Project Row Houses partnered with the School of Architecture at Rice University to build low-income housing. By the end of 2010 Project Row Houses will be housing over 75 residents. The art installations continue in six-month cycles.

Arena Productions

Curator Chris Ballou and artist Sean Thornton staged a series of interactive public art exhibitions in response to what they saw as inadequate art-presentation strategies by galleries and museums. Unusual in format, these exhibitions appeared in unlikely places: Frost Free was held in the appliance department of a Sears store; Potlatch occurred in a local warehouse as part of Rolywholyover–A Circus for Museum by John Cage, presented at the Menil Collection; and Cross-City Blowout was a traveling “art mobile” stuffed full of artworks from Houston artists.

1994
Museum of the Weird

Dolan Smith founded the Museum of the Weird in his two-bedroom house in Houston's Heights. Attending by appointment, visitors could view a pet columbarium where Smith entombed the ashes of people's pets, a homemade “Bed of Nails,” 12-foot-long (3.7 m) tusks, a giant model of a heart, an oversized papier-mâché wasps’ nest, and the “Dome of Silence,” as well as Smith's paintings. The Museum of the Weird also included the “Scar Room,” where Smith documented every scar on his own body and urged visitors to add scar stories of their own.

El Palomar Restaurant

Artists Lucas Johnson, Dick Wray, Lynne Foster and H.J. Bott began programming exhibitions in El Palomar Restaurant, a modest Mexican café on White Oak Drive in Houston's Heights. For every exhibition, Foster produced a catalogue comprising photocopies of photographs taken at the exhibition opening.

Gallery One Three Seven

Sharon Engelstein opened Houston's smallest gallery, a 1.37-square-foot (0.127 m^{2}) space modeled after the main space at the Texas Gallery. This portable space, whose floors were made of coffee stir sticks to simulate hardwood, hosted exhibitions of miniature work by a number of other artists.

Sam Houston by David Adickes

A Tribute to Courage, a 67-foot-tall (20 m) statue of Sam Houston on a 10-foot (3.0 m) granite base, created by David Addickes, was erected on Interstate 45 in Huntsville, Texas, Sam Houston's home.

Pigdom

Victoria Herberta moved to Houston and began to create a “Shrine to Swine” at her Crawford Street home. She lived with her pig, Jerome. Her collection features pig memorabillia, license plates and thousands of soda bottles. Unfortunately, when Victoria died, Judy, her roommate was evicted from the house, and Pigdom no longer exists, although the art work was stripped from the home and salvaged.

Rolywholyover–A Circus for Museum by John Cage

The exhibition Rolywholyover–A Circus for Museum by John Cage, presented by the Menil Collection, included the rotating display of objects from all the museums in Houston (including the National Museum of Funeral History, among others) and a multidisciplinary, multi-organizational series of events staged throughout the city by local artists and organizations.

1995
Art of this century

Jeff Elrod and Mark Flood opened a gallery in Elrod's storefront studio on West Gray Street and named it Art of this century (after Peggy Guggenheim's 1940s New York gallery). It mounted four shows, but the space was not open to the public: Elrod explained, “I like having a gallery, but I hate having to be here to let people come in. Now they can just look in the window.” Each show was accompanied by a handmade catalogue with an essay, and boasted lively openings attended by artists and art world insiders. The inaugural exhibition, Objects Beside the Economy, was curated by Robert Montgomery.

Bobbindoctrin Puppet Theatre

Founded by Joel Orr, this puppet theatre presented experimental adult puppet performances with low admission prices, giving actors, directors, playwrights, musicians, sculptors, dancers, and engineers a singular outlet for their creativity. Bobbindoctrin has since performed original work hundreds of times in both traditional and nontraditional places.

O House

Sculptors Dan Havel, Dean Ruck, and Kate Petley collaborated on O House, a large-scale installation that transformed a small bungalow slated for demolition in Houston's West End neighborhood into a camera obscura. The work featured an interior circular room, earth floors, and pinhole projections of surrounding trees and the sky. The artists funded the project with proceeds from a tip jar at the front door.

Jim Pirtle Is Forrest Gump

Artist Jim Pirtle produced a video parody of the famous Hollywood movie by lip-synching the actual appropriated soundtrack with himself in the starring role. Shooting entirely on the grounds of the Zocalo artists’ compound, he enlisted many artist friends (Nestor Topchy, Mark Flood, George Hixson, Michael Battey, Giles Lyon, The Art Guys, among others) to play various characters in the movie. The video was later screened at various underground and alternative venues such as Aurora Picture Show and Cue Foundation.

1996
Mural on William Steen's Studio

In association with the community service group Youth Advocates, William Steen made available a 16-foot-high (4.9 m) wall on the side of his studio building on Harrisburg Boulevard as a site for a constantly changing painting created by a core group of graffiti artists including Daniel Anguilu, Guillermo Morales, Carlos Martinez, Chris Rodriguez, Jason Nava, and Roland Saldana. Though sanctioned, the paintings provoked the Houston Police Department's attention and in July 2000 were overpainted in an anti-graffiti campaign.

ARTPIX

Fredericka Hunter and Ian Glennie formed ARTPIX, an experiment to explore new media and commission young artists to create new work on CD. Ongoing today, it has evolved to include archival projects that bring little-known work forward.

1997
notsuoH

Artist Jim Pirtle renovated a nineteenth-century storefront building on Main Street in downtown Houston into a coffee bar/ chess club/gallery/performance space that he dubbed notsuoH—Houston spelled backwards and the name of an early twentieth-century civic celebration. notsuoH became one of the most notorious, complicated, experimental “social-sculpture” environments in Houston. On any given night, one could converse with physicists while playing chess with a homeless alcoholic against the background noise of a Japanese speed punk band.

Revolution Summer

Before he moved to California, Mark Allen opened an art space called Revolution Summer where he walled off and painted the interior of his rented house and mounted three conceptual art exhibitions.

1998
Aurora Picture Show

Artist Andrea Grover founded the Aurora Picture Show, a micro-cinema, in her home in a former church in the Sunset Heights. Currently the organization is housed in a renovated warehouse in the Rice/Upper Kirby area. Programming is dedicated to noncommercial film, video, and media, often presented in other nontraditional venues. To date, they have screened over eight thousand films and videos and hosted over six hundred artists.

Absolut Art Guys Billboard

The Art Guys were commissioned by Absolut Vodka to create a billboard. Located on the West 610 Loop freeway near the Galleria, the billboard featured a giant Vodka bottle that was painted with a thousand separate coats of paint over a nine-month period.

SUITS
The Clothes Make the Man

The Art Guys unveiled their conceptual artwork SUITS with a two-man parade in downtown Houston. After leasing advertising space on two business suits designed by Todd Oldham, The Art Guys wore them for a year, promoting their “clients.”

Art Car Museum

Artist and patron Ann Harithas and former Contemporary Arts Museum Director James Harithas founded the Art Car Museum at the southern end of Heights Boulevard. Today it presents exhibitions and programs featuring art and art cars.

Pop-Up Sculpture

For the Millennium artist Lee Littlefield installed his first artist-initiated Pop-Up sculpture along Interstate 10 near downtown Houston. Typically painted in eye-catching yellow and made from willowy vines and branches, the sculptures now number in the hundreds and have become well known to travelers in and around the city.

1999
Watershed Collective

A group of artists known as the Watershed Collective, occupying a group of buildings on property at TC Jester and Interstate 10, began a yearly program of allowing other artists to create an artwork on a billboard on their property that faces the interstate, directing its message to the passing traffic on the freeway.

== 2000s ==
2000
Field of Vision

Bert L. Long Jr., created Field of Vision, a series of eyes resting on pedestals fashioned out of concrete and installed in a parklike setting in the Fifth Ward; each was dyed a different color to reflect the diversity of the neighborhood. After it was vandalized, it was relocated in 2008 to a site on the Project Row Houses campus next to the Eldorado Ballroom.

Itchy Acres

Area artists including Paul Kittelson, Carter Ernst, Ed Wilson, Lee Littlefield, and Tim Glover, among others, relocated their studios and residences in a neighborhood in North Houston between Yale and North Shepherd Streets on various plots of wooded acreage. Today they use the shared compound for exhibitions and musical performances.

2001
The Station Museum

Ann and James Harithas established the Station Museum of Contemporary Art to present topical exhibitions of works by artists from around the world and to serve as a platform for artists to express progressive alternative political and artistic points of view.

Live Oak Friends Meeting House

Live Oak Friends Meeting House was built in a collaboration initiated and organized by Hiram Butler that involved light artist James Turrell, architect Leslie Elkins, and the Live Oak Friends Meeting. Notable for Turrell's open-roof Skyspace, this Quaker place of worship, funded largely through the generosity of the arts community, today is open for public viewing every Friday evening.

Nameless Sound

In 2001 musician David Dove founded Deep Listening Institute Houston (DLIH), a branch of a New York organization, to bring world-class musicians to Houston and further his teaching goals. In 2006, under Dove's direction, DLIH became Nameless Sound, an independent Houston-based 501(c)3. That same year, Nameless Sound expanded to include two classes for people with special needs (the mentally-challenged and autistic) and a Creative Kids Ensemble (grades K though 8th) in addition to its Youth Ensemble, public school workshops, and homeless shelter workshops. In 2008, Nameless Sound added a class for refugee children (political asylum seekers). Nameless Sound has become an important regional presenter of creative music, contemporary jazz and musical improvisation, making Houston an important center for the art form. Nameless Sound has become known nationally for a new type of music education, emphasizing creativity, improvisation, and diversity.

2002
The Million Dollar Hotel

Artist Paul Horn, in collaboration with Dolan Smith, took over the entire top floor of the Holiday Inn Select at Highway 59 and Kirby for the exhibition The Million Dollar Hotel. The show brought together more than twenty artists, each exhibiting in a separate room or suite, for a long night of exhibition, performance, and general mayhem.

Otabenga Jones & Associates

Otabenga Jones & Associates, the Houston-based artist collective of Dawolu Jabari Anderson, Jamal Cyrus, Kenya Evans, and Robert Pruitt, began staging artworks and installations dealing with African American social and historical issues. The group's work was featured in the 2006 Whitney Biennial.

2003
Trailer Park

Trailer Park was an exhibition organized by artist Danny Kerschen on August 30, 2003, in a Trailer home in Deer Park, Texas. It included work by artists Aimee Jones, David Krueger, Donna Huanca, Gabriel Delgado, Rosalinda Gonzalez, Gorton Othengo, Jason Villegas, John Champion, Jon Read, MD Williams, and Virginia Fleck. The exhibition also featured musical performances by Go Spread Your Wings, NME, Indian Jewelry, and the Wiggins (the last performing in a bathroom.)

Workshop Houston

Workshop Houston was founded by artists Zach Moser, Katy Goodman, Seth Capron, and Benjamin Mason. Today it has five workshops in Houston's Third Ward that provide resources and support for young people: a do-it-yourself bike repair shop, a welding and metal fabrication shop, the Beat Shop for music production, a fashion design shop, and the Scholar Shop for tutoring and academic enrichment.

Bill Hicks Resurrection Laboratory

The Bill Hicks Resurrection Laboratory was an independent artist-run collective space. Active from 2003 until 2006, BHRL offered space for wood and metal shops, screen-printing facilities, craft area, event space, and an edible garden. It was located at 2915 Delafield off Old Spanish Trail.

2004
HIWI (Houston. It's Worth It.)

Dave Thompson and Randy Twaddle created HIWI (Houston. It's Worth It.), launching a website where Houstonians could express in their own words why Houston is worth it. Later HIWI partnered with the Houston Center for Photography to present the open call exhibition Houston. It's Worth It.—Show Us Why. The exhibitors received and displayed over six hundred images. Created from the exhibition and website, the landmark book Houston. It's Worth It. (HIWI: The Book) was published in 2007.

Billboard Series

While its gallery was undergoing renovation, Lawndale Art Center moved its programming to the streets with the Billboard series. A billboard at Highway 59 and Montrose Boulevard provided a venue from June through November for the works of five artists: Ryan Molloy's The Jones’ Got Platinum Doorknobs; Katrina Moorhead's Sampled Sky; Fannie Taper's Trust; Mark Wade's Manifest Destiny; C. Andrew Boyd's Hero 1K; and Danny Yahev-Brown's untitled project.

2005
Sketch Klubb

Sketch Klubb was organized to meet bimonthly and produce drawings and a ’zine. The group now counts twelve members, including artists Patrick Phipps, J. Michael Stovall, Rene Cruz, Michael Harwell, Lane Hagood, Nick Meriwether, Sebastian Forray, Eric Pearce, Seth Alverson, David Wang, Cody Ledvina and bookseller Russell Etchen. They have produced over fifty ’zines and have compiled two anthologies, You Don’t Know Any Girls (2007) and Show Us Your Zits (2009).

Cynthia Woods Mitchell Center for the Arts

The Cynthia Woods Mitchell Center for the Arts, a center for artistic collaboration at the University of Houston, presented its inaugural performance, DUGOUT III: WARBOY (and the backboard blues), a musical theatre piece written and directed by multidisciplinary artist Terry Allen. Featuring original music by Terry Allen, Richard Bowden, and Lloyd Maines, it starred veteran actress Jo Harvey Allen.

Inversion

Sculptors Dan Havel and Dean Ruck altered two buildings owned by the Art League of Houston on the corner of Montrose Boulevard and Willard Street. The exterior skins of the houses were peeled off and used to create a large vortex that funneled into the small central hallway connecting the two buildings and eventually exited through a small hole into an adjacent courtyard. Inversion has become one of Houston's most well-known, albeit vanished, sculptures. The structure was later demolished to make way for a new Art League building.

Knitta Please

A group of anonymous knitters began to tag public signage, doorknobs, railings, trees, fences, and public sculptures on the streets of Houston with custom-knitted sculptures wrapped around the objects.The members took graffiti names and they were known to slip knitted covers into vehicles, trees and stores in Houston metro.

Westheimer Block Party

The traditional Houston street art festival began on Westheimer Street in the 1970s. A group of young artists, led by independent curator/writer Sean Carroll, revived the festival to include drive-by painting exhibitions, a bike-ride exhibition through the neighborhood, graffiti, busking, site-specific installation, performance art, and social interactions. Participants included Elia Arce, Robert Pruitt, Will Boone, JoAnn Park, Cheyenne Ramos, Matthew Dupont, YAR!, BLOWJACK, B~Kay, and Skeez-181, among others.

2006
El Rincón Social (ERS)

Founded by Juan Alonzo, this alternative studio space was established to create an environment to nurture an exchange of ideas and experiences through artistic practices to the benefit the surrounding East End neighborhood community. For further expansion of community dialogue, ERS has facilitated and hosted workshops, exhibitions, and art events that showcase local artists and artwork produced through these activities. An annual photography exhibition, RATIO, showcasing a wealth of Houston photographers, has been established. ERS houses a diverse array of artists – painters, photographers, sculptors, videographers, and performers.

Mobile Cinemas

In April the Aurora Picture Show converted two Toyota Scions into mobile micro-cinemas using portable projectors with the rear windows as projection surfaces. In June the Aurora Picture Show, the nonprofit arts organization Minetta Brook, and the Buffalo Bayou Partnership presented a floating cinema barge for viewing by an audience sitting on the banks of the bayou.

2007
This Old House by Aerosol Warfare

Aerosol Warfare was invited to paint the exterior of a house acquired by DiverseWorks at Alabama Street and Almeda Road in a project called This Old House.

Performance Art Lab (PAL)

Performance Art Lab (PAL) was founded by Elia Arce, then a graduate art student at the University of Houston. She taught performance art and worked with her students to create the collective. When the class ended in 2008, PAL was launched as an independent performance collective. Guerilla performances staged in 2008 included Sexy Attack, inspired by an eighties-style aerobic workout video. PAL members choreographed their own version and took it to the streets. Showing up unannounced in over 50 public places such as Kroger's grocery store, performers played a boombox and did their workout. The online videos became very popular on YouTube.

the joanna

In March artists Cody Ledvina and Brian Rod created “the joanna,” an artists’ collective and space for presenting art, performances, and collaborative endeavors in what was Rod's and is currently Ledvina's home on Graustark Street. Using the bedroom, living room, kitchen, garage, and backyard for staging programs, it is open today for special events and by appointment.

Never Been to Houston

Co-curated by the Aurora Picture Show's Andrea Grover and artist Jon Rubin for Lawndale Art Center, Never Been to Houston invited artists from around the world to photographically document (without leaving home) what they imagined Houston looked like. They uploaded their photos on a daily basis to an on-line photo-sharing site; the images were projected as an evolving slide show at Lawndale Art Center. A sequel exhibition, Never Been to Tehran, was presented by Parkingallery, Tehran.

Hello Lucky

A group of artists led by Teresa O’Connor founded Hello Lucky, an artists’ boutique on Studewood Street in Houston's Heights. Artists consign their works for sale, and part of the proceeds go to nonprofit arts organizations across Houston.

2008
BOX 13 Artspace

Located in Houston's East End at Harrisburg Boulevard and Cesar Chavez Street, the nonprofit artist-run exhibition and studio space BOX 13 was founded by Elaine Bradford, Woody Golden, Michael Henderson, Young-Min Kang, Kathy Kelley, Teresa O’Connor, Whitney Riley, and Mat Wolff. The space today offers studios for emerging and established artists, with two exhibition galleries, a window gallery for installations, and an outdoor performance and exhibition space.

The Soldier Billboards

DiverseWorks organized The Soldier Billboards by Suzanne Opton. Appearing on billboards throughout Houston were photographs of soldiers who had been deployed more than once to Afghanistan and Iraq, and a website address where one could go to get more information about the individuals represented.

Skydive

Artists Sasha Dela and Ariane Roesch founded Skydive, an exhibition space in their studio on the ninth floor of the office building on Montrose Boulevard that houses the Skybar. Skydive was established to create opportunities for artists and to broaden the spectrum of arts dialogue in the city by bringing artists from around the country to Houston. Many of the artists presented are exploring relational aesthetics, a form of art that relies on a direct interaction between the art and the viewer.

2009
Sunday Soup

Sunday Soup, a community meal that functions as a grant funding process, was launched at the exhibition space Skydive. Proceeds from the $5 meal go to support an artist initiative or community project.

labotanica

Artist Ayanna Jolivet McCloud conceived and founded labotanica, a resource and a laboratory using flexible, open-ended formats to frame new art forms and dialogues. Based in Houston's third ward community, labotanica is a multi-disciplinary space that engages diverse communities through education, collaboration, and experimentation.

The Great God Pan is Dead

Robert Boyd created this art blog as a way to educate himself about the art being created in Houston. After a year, he had written more than 300 blog posts, mostly reviews of exhibits and performances in Houston.

== Bibliography ==
- Cathcart, Linda L. (1982). In Our Time: Houston's Contemporary Arts Museum, 1948–1982, Contemporary Arts Museum Houston. ISBN 978-0-936080-09-3.
- Greene, Alison di Lima (2000). Texas: 150 Works from the Museum of Fine Arts, The Museum of Fine Arts, Houston. ISBN 0-89090-095-7.
- Herbert, Lynn M. (2006). Jim Love: From Now On, Contemporary Arts Museum Houston. ISBN 0-85667-609-8
- Herbert, Lynn M. and Valeris Cassel Oliver (2004). Perspectives @25: A Quarter Century of New Art in Houston, Contemporary Arts Museum Houston. ISBN 0-936080-90-6.
- Huber, Caroline and The Art Guys (2009). “Merging Traffic: A Chronology” from No Zoning: Artists Engage Houston, Contemporary Arts Museum Houston. ISBN 978-1-933619-19-4.
- Mayo, Marti (1997, exhibition catalogue). Finders Keepers, Contemporary Arts Museum Houston. ISBN 0-936080-41-8.
- McBride, Elizabeth, et al. (1993, exhibition catalogue). DiverseWorks Artspace, 1983–93, DiverseWorks Artspace, Houston.
- Rose, Barbara and Susie Kalil (1985). Fresh Paint: The Houston School, Museum of Fine Arts, Houston. ISBN 0-87719-000-3.
