= Nestor Topchy =

American painter and sculptor

Nestor Topchy is a painter, sculptor, installation artist, and performance artist in Houston, Texas. He was born in Somerville, New Jersey in 1963. His work interweaves paradoxical strands of thought, incongruous painting techniques, disparate artistic traditions, and antithetical pictorial attitudes to express a coherent and pantheistic vision of reality.

== Early life and education ==
Topchy holds a BFA from the Maryland Institute College of Art in Baltimore (1985) and an MFA in Art from the University of Houston (1987). In 1982, Topchy chanced upon a retrospective of Yves Klein's work at the Guggenheim, organized by Dominique De Menil for the Rice Museum in Houston. Topchy credits Klein's use of IKB, a saturated ultramarine blue pigment that represented "the void”, as a pivotal discovery. After using this color on spherical sculptures, Topchy realized their connection to Pysanky, ornate Ukrainian Easter eggs which he made in childhood with his mother and paternal family, who immigrated from Stalinist Ukraine as displaced persons following world war two. Further inspired by Klein, Topchy earned a black belt in judo under Karl Geis from 1998-2014 and is currently practicing Tomiki Aikido and Kyudo in the Heki Ryū Bishū Chikurin-ha lineage of Kanjuro Shibata XX. He has also studied Buddhism, Taoism, Qigong and Gnosticism. From 2003-2007 he studied Chinese painting with "Frank" Chiu Ching Ping. In 2004 Topchy studied Icon Writing at the Prosopon School in NYC.

== Work ==
=== TemplO/Zocalo ===
From 1989 to 2001, Topchy was Co-Founder and Artistic Director of [Zocalo/TemplO], a nonprofit artist-run performance compound he shared with Rick Lowe and Dean Ruck. TemplO/Zocalo was an incubator for experimental artistic activity, and gave artists of all disciplines a forum for creating, exhibiting and staging experimental and edgy works. The complex housed artists' studios and living spaces, a gallery, indoor and outdoor stages, and embodied the belief that art is a creative and spiritual way of doing anything.

Many TemplO/Zocalo collaborators achieved regional and national prominence, including Andrea Grover of Aurora Picture Show, The Art Guys, Jason Nodler and Tamarie Cooper of Catastrophic Theater, Kevin Cunningham of Three Legged Dog in New York, dancer Richie Hubscher and lighting designer Christina Giannelli of the Metropolitan Opera, Mariana Lemesoff of Helios Arts/AvantGarden, New York painter Giles Lyon, the late video pioneer Andy Mann, and conductor Jon Axelrod . Alison de Lima Greene, curator of the Museum of Fine Arts Houston, which owns a bit of Topchy's earlier work, described TemplO as Gesamtkunstwerk, a total work of art.

=== HIVE Houston ===
In the early 1990s, Topchy noticed rows of shipping containers stacked ten high in the Houston Ship Channel. He imagined the containers as the building blocks that could serve a community's needs in a beautiful way, at once creating a utilitarian and situational art.

In 2004, as part of the Project Row Houses Festival (with the support of Rick Lowe, its then Interim Director Michael Peranteau and in collaboration with architect Cameron Armstrong and artist Jack Massing), Topchy installed a single donated container simply known as Seed. Within Seed Topchy constructed mock-ups of shipping containers converted to habitable boxes re-purposed as a school, hospital, jail, shop, mall and residential living facilities. Seed became the prototype for Organ, a proposed living work of art and architecture and sustainable village to be constructed from 486 steel shipping containers. Organ was featured in the 2009 "No Zoning" exhibition at the Contemporary Arts Museum Houston curated by Toby Kamps and Meredith Goldsmith, and with further assistance from consultant Mariana Lemesoff, architect Si Dang, engineer Hisham El-Chaar, then Executive Director Heidi Vaughn, the project become an emergent reality. now known as HIVE, or Habitable Interdisciplinary Visionary Environment, the project is looking to reach the next stage beyond planning to acquire a permanent site, grow its board of directors, and build community.

=== Iconic Portrait Strand ===
In 2006, Topchy began his "Iconic Portrait Strand", using traditional Byzantine materials—egg-vinegar tempera, minerals, honey, beer, vodka, fig milk, cloves, linseed oil and gold leaf—painted on deme-shaped wooden panels.

During a five-minute session, Topchy measures the composition with a camera Lucida, draws the sitter from life, and takes a digital snap shot for color reference. Topchy paints the image over a period of months. "After the cut out boards are sized, gessoed and polished, a drawing, or graphia, is positioned on the board which feels right for that specific image. It is then transferred with carbon paper, etched with a stylus, and red clay bole is applied to the areas to be gold leafed. The gold leaf is applied first and then finished. The twelve layers of egg/vinegar tempera is applied in puddles to the horizontal board and allowed to sink in and dry. Each layer is an opportunity to be still in meditation and contemplation. When finished, the image is anointed with olipha/oil to seal it."

According to Topchy, "Sitters are recruited through word of mouth via station 32, Haitian slang for the number of teeth in our mouths. Direct person-to-person contact and transmission replace computer hardware with human wetware. Through real-time art, the portraits enjoin individuals in a growing corpus as each new sitter's likeness is added."

"The portraits belong to the Demekon family. Each individual portrait functions like a single gene maintaining an agency within a larger corpus, itself a system and identity positioned within a yet larger unseen agency. As a whole, the entire group is assembled into a socio-cultural strand of DNA," Topchy said.

According to poet Randall Watson, Topchy rejects the traditional notions that divide the sacred and the profane, insisting instead on the equivalent necessity of the ordinary as a container through which the extraordinary is revealed. Such work has an epiphanic, revelatory cast, for while clearly not canonized by an official edict of the church, Topchy's subjects are beatified by context, or in other words, by the artist's gesture. They too, he proclaims, are manifestations of a divine embodiment.

These portraits closely resemble medieval icons, featuring gold leaf, flatness, abstraction, and the vermicular style typical of iconography. They are executed in the Novgorod Russian tradition of egg tempera, which Nestor studied at the Prosopon School in New York City. As a result, the paintings function simultaneously as medieval Byzantine icons and modern portraits, creating a notable tension between the two styles.

A portrait by Topchy, more precisely, the manner in which Topchy depicts the features of the heads, often creates this same distinctive feeling of the beyond...they insinuate a beyond. The facial features are articulated by 'calligraphies' of diverse origin, they come not only from egg decorating but also from orthodox icon painting, Chinese calligraphy, expressionism, cubism.

In early 2011, the Ivan Honchar Museum in Kiev presented Topchy's work in a solo exhibition.

== Archetapas ==
In 2012, Topchy received an Idea Fund / Andy Warhol Foundation grant for his project Archetapas-Gastronanza, a collaboration with Robert Rosenberg (AKA Chef Bob) to create a total, edible work of art coupled with scientific inquiry for public consumption via a continuing series of public tasting/performance events wherein participants enter a repurposed shipping container or trailer to be offered an array of geometrically shaped, colored, flavored gelatins and given an opportunity to complete a recorded associative survey whereby a consensus is realized as to which edible sculptures are assigned specific archetypal significance.

Archetapas is an evolving menu of colored, flavored geometric shapes, Demes derived from the Demekosm, a drawing system of interlocking circles and lines from which much the worlds geometries have been and are traditionally derived.

The project introduces a gustatory element to create an edible work of art for public engagement and study. Participants enter a repurposed trailer to sample Archetapas from the menu, contributing to the assignment of specific shapes with archetypal significance. Through this process, an edible corpus is established, and each shape is defined with a corresponding subject.

On the computer screen presented survey, the question "looks like?" appears below each shape and the participants answers are stored in a database. The Any universality of shape, color and flavor most appropriate for each iconic geometrical shape is established based upon empirical consensus recorded over time. For example, would most people agree that a certain five-sided shape should be called a house? Should taste like chocolate, or ginger? Will every one think "house "when they see this shape? Etc. The results, both qualitative and quantitative, assigning and establishing each shape a subjective identity can serve to gather a taxonomy of verifiable, universally arising subjects, concurrently, to reconcile subject and object through the collective subconscious mind.

It is anticipated that this project will include and transcend the quantitative data and qualitative meaning gathered from many people with different backgrounds; it is a poly-cultural associative survey which is pre-lingual and may yield archetypal forms that are universally recognizable. Such shapes will have multiple connotative purposes as well, one of which is establishing subject matter for painting, and at the least uniting minds through shared experience.

What would be truly surprising would be to find that shape could not evoke subject, that subject could not evoke color, and that color could not suggest flavor, seeing that things have always found their expression through a system of reciprocal analogy, and that this may be a universal, verifiable truth."
