= Jason Villegas =

American artist (born 1977)

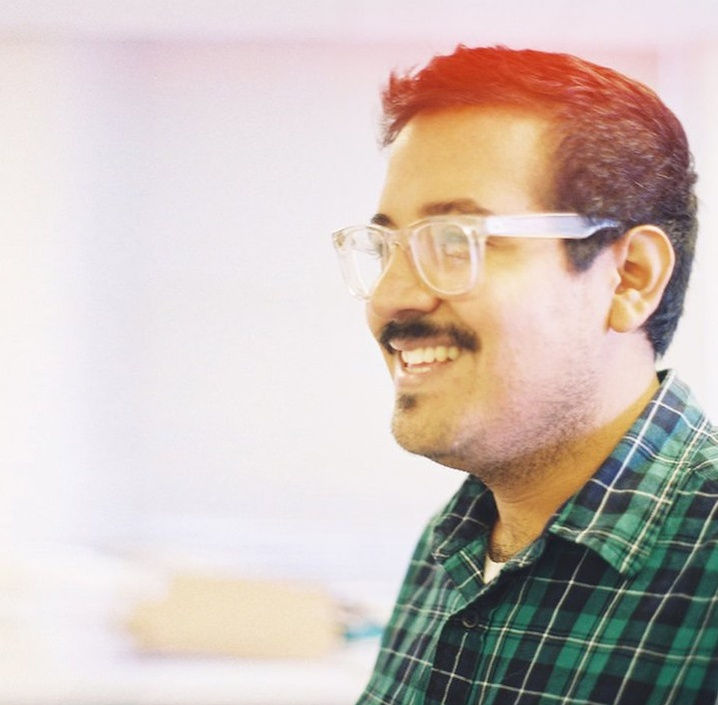
- Jason Villegas at Lower Manhattan Cultural Council
- Born: August 16, 1977 (age 47); Houston, TX, United States
- Education: Mason Gross School of the Arts
- Known for: Queer art, Ceramics, Sculpture, and Installation Art
- Awards: Leslie Lohman Museum of Queer Art, Artist Fellowship; Lower Manhattan Cultural Council, Workspace Studio; Socrates Sculpture Park, Emerging Artist Fellowship
- Website: www.jason-villegas.com

Jason Villegas (born August 16, 1977 in Houston, TX) is a San Francisco based contemporary artist. He has exhibited across the United States and internationally. Villegas' work includes sculpture, installation, painting, drawing, textile, video and performance, exploring concepts such as globalism, evolution, sexuality, cosmology, and consumerism. Motifs in Villegas' artworks include fashion logos, animal hybrids, weaponry, sales banners, clothing piles, anuses, cosmic debris, taxidermy, bear men, amorphous beasts, religious iconography, and party scenarios.

== Education ==
Villegas earned his MFA in 2007 at the Mason Gross School of Art at Rutgers University in New Brunswick, NJ and his BFA in 2003 at the University of Houston in Texas.

== Awards ==
- Leslie Lohman Museum of Queer Art, Artist Fellowship (2019)
- Lower Manhattan Cultural Council, Workspace Studio (2010)
- Socrates Sculpture Park, Emerging Artist Fellowship (2010)
- Vermont Studio Center, Nadine Goldsmith Fellowship (2007)
- Artadia Houston, Grant Finalist (2004)

== Phantom Sightings ==
Jason Villegas was a part of the traveling group exhibition Phantom Sightings: Art After the Chicano Movement, curated by Rita Gonzales, Howard Fox, and Chen Noriega. Beginning at the Los Angeles County Museum of Art (LACMA) in 2008, the exhibit toured for two years including renowned spaces such as, the Tamayo Museum in Mexico City, El Museo del Barrio in New York City, the Phoenix Art Museum (PAM) in Arizona, Museo de Arte de Zappopan in Guadalajara, and the Museo Alameda in San Antonio. His selected work "Celestial Situation" (2006) featured a wall mural of painting and drawing depicting planetary spheres of cosmic clutter involving a video projection of animated 2D artworks onto a drawing of compressed entertainment electronics and media. The animation reveals a consumption cosmology of anuses, amorphous beasts, and a rotund man watching television.

== Exhibitions ==
=== Solo exhibitions ===
- "Perspectives: 167" Contemporary Arts Museum Houston, TX (2009)
- "Botched Simulacrum" McClain Gallery Houston, TX (2009)
- "Hunter Gatherer" Receiver Gallery San Francisco, CA (2008)
- "Cosmic Slut" Gescheidle Chicago, IL (2008)
- "Impish Animal" Okay Mountain Austin, TX (2008)
- "G*D" Project Gallery New Brunswick, NJ (2007)
- "Forever Developing Shrine" Plush Dallas, TX (2006)
- "Repressed Burial Fantasy" Okay Mountain Austin, TX (2006)
- "Ultrabastard: marketing seminar" Cactus Bra Space San Antonio, TX (2005)
- "Absolute Destiny Apocalypse" Deborah Colton Gallery Houston, TX (2005)
- "Growth Hormone Mutation Make-Over" Plush Dallas, TX (2005)
- "Beast Taxidermy" CSAW Houston, TX (2004)
- "Romantic Poverty & Hunger Pains" Montgomery College Conroe, TX (2004)

=== Group exhibitions ===
- "Dissolution" Leslie Lohman Museum of Queer Art, NY, NY (2021)
- "Omniscient: Queer Documentation in an Image Culture" Leslie Lohman Museum of Queer Art, NY, NY (2021)
- "Flamecon" Sheraton Times Square, NY, NY (2019)
- "The Alchemical Trace" Sanitary Tortilla Factory, Albuquerque, NM (2017)
- "Salon Style" Zoya Tommy Gallery, Houston, TX (2014)
- "Flatland" Guadalupe Cultural Arts Center, San Antonio, TX (2014)
- "Summer School" Liliana Bloch Gallery, Dallas, TX (2013)
- "Aqua Art Fair" Plush Gallery, Miami, Fl (2012)
- "Permanent Collection Exhibit" Tijuana US Consulate, MEXICO (2011)
- "Joni" Kathleen Cullen Gallery, NYC, NY (2010)
- "Emerging Artist Fellowship" Socrates Sculpture Park, Long Island City, NY (2010)
- "Head and Pole" Western Exhibitions Chicago, IL (2010)
- "Global National" Exit Art NYC, NY (2010)
- "Phantom Sightings: Art After the Chicano Movement" El Museo del Barrio, NYC (2010)
- "Aparaciones Fantasmales" Museo de Arte de Zappopan, Guadalajara, MX (2009)
- "Phantom Sightings: Art After the Chicano Movement" Phoenix Art Museum AZ (2009)
- "Phantom Sightings: Art After the Chicano Movement" Alameda Museum San Antonio, TX (2009)
- "Aparaciones Fantasmales" Museo Ruffino Tamayo, Mexico City (2008)
- "Phantom Sightings: Art After the Chicano Movement" LACMA Los Angeles, CA (2008)
- "Children in Heat Lawndale Art Center" Houston, TX 2007 Art Club Gescheidle Chicago, IL (2008)
- "The Paul Nudd Curatorial Experience" Western Exhibitions Chicago, IL (2008)
- "Eyes Wide Open" El Museo Del Barrio / The Armory New York, NY (2008)
- "The Dams 2 / Las Represas" Universidad del Sagrado Corazón Puerto Rico (2008)
- "Object" UT at Dallas, TX 2006 Manic & Wasted Swing Space NYC, NY (2008)
- "Debut" The Texas Firehouse LIC, NY (2008)
- "Stop Trashing Houston" Versionfest Chicago, IL (2008)
- "La Frontera" Gescheidle Chicago, IL (2008)
- "Young Latino Artists #10" Mexic Arte Museum Austin, TX (2005)
- "Artadia Houston" Diverseworks Houston, TX (2005)
- "I-10 a Postmodern Route 66" McClain Gallery Houston, TX (2005)
- "New Cartoon" Deborah Colton Gallery Houston, TX (2005)
- "Woods" Negative Space Houston, TX (2005)
- "Temporary Contemporary" The Orange Show Houston, TX (2004)
- "Sloppy Slobbering Monster" The Bank Kansas City, MO (2004)
- "In Situ" Allen's Landing Houston, TX (2004)
- "Camp Lucky Summer of Carnage" Deborah Colton Gallery Houston, TX (2004)
- "Brothers" Fresh up Club Austin, TX (2004)
- "New American Talent 19" ArtHouse Austin, TX (2004)
- "Brave New World" McClain Gallery Houston, TX (2004)
- "Animals" ArtCar Museum Houston, TX (2003)
- "The Big Show" Lawndale Art Center Houston, TX (2003)
- "Dallas vs. Houston" Plush Gallery Dallas, TX (2003)
- "Trailer Park" Deer Park, TX (2003)
- "The Big Show" Lawndale Art Center Houston, TX (2002)
- "Friendly Mart" Quick Stop Houston, TX (2001)

== Publications ==
- Glasstire: Texas Visual Art Online "Salon Style" by Bill Davenport, February (2014)
- Boro Magazine "Art Imitates Life" (2011)
- ArtLies January (2010)
- OutSmart "It's All About Identity" by Rich Arenschieldt, September (2009)
- Houston Chronicle "Jason Villegas casts animal logos as invasive species" by Douglas Britt, August (2009)
- Houston Press "Perspectives 167: Jason Villegas" by D.L. Groover, October (2009)
- Houston Press "Polo by Jason Villegas" by Kelly Klassmeyer, October (2009)
- LACMA Phantom Sightings: Art After The Chicano Movement exhibition catalog by Howard Fox, Rita Fox (2008)
- LA Times Phantom Sightings: Art After The Chicano Movement (2008)
- Art in America "Jason Villegas at Dallas" by Charles Dee Mitchell, May (2007)
- Cantanker Magazine “Okay Mountain: Jason Villegas” by Cherie Weaver, May (2006)
- Glasstire: Texas Visual Art Online "Tire Iron 52" by Bill Davenport, July (2005)
- Austin American-Statesman “An exhibition of latino art-whatever that may be” by Jeanne Claire van Ryzia, August (2005)
- Dallas Observer “Growth Hormone Mutation Make-over” by Charrissa N Terranova, February (2005)
- Houston Press “New Cartoon” by Kelly Klaasmeyer, March (2005)
- Houston Press “Woods” by Kelly Klaasmeyer, February (2005)
- Glasstire: Texas Visual Art Online "Best of 2004" by Rachel Cook (2004)
- New American Talent, The Nineteenth Exhibition, Arthouse, Exhibition Catalog (2004)
- Houston Press “Temporary Insanity” by Steven Devedanam, November (2004)
- Houston Press “No Virgins, No Velvet” by Josh Harkinson, November (2004)
- Houston Press “New World Order” by Steven Devedanam, May (2004)
- Dallas Observer “Urban Brawl, It’s Houston vs. Dallas” by Annabelle Massey Helber, April (2003)
- Houston Press “The Biggest and the Baddest” by Kelly Klaasmeyer, July (2002)
