= Farrell Dyde =

American dancer

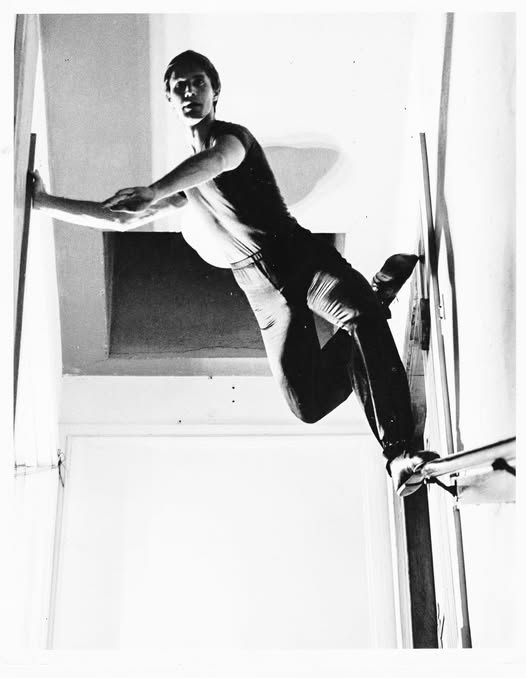
- Dyde in 1985
- Born: May 14, 1948 (age 77); New York City, New York, U.S.
- Occupations: Dancer; Choreographer; Dance company founder
- Spouse: Marrie Richards (m. 1981; div. 1986)

Farrell Laurence Dyde (born May 14, 1948) is an American dancer, choreographer and dance company founder.

== Early life and education ==
Dyde was born in New York City to James and Ellie (Aregita) Dyde. His father was a psychiatrist; his mother was a registered nurse and “frustrated artist.” Walters Farrell Dyde, former Vice President of The University of Colorado (CU) and founder of the school's Creative Arts Program, was his paternal grandfather.

Farrell grew up in the Denver Metropolitan Area. He attended Littleton High School, graduating in 1966. He served on the Student Council and was a member of the ski club and folk singing club. He played football, basketball and baseball. As a young man, he dreamed of becoming a professional baseball player, but gave it up when he discovered theater. His senior year, Dyde performed in See How They Run and The Unsinkable Molly Brown. He played the lead role of Fred Graham/Petruchio in Kiss Me Kate during a summer workshop performance put on by a combined cast and crew of Littleton and Arapahoe high schools.

At CU-Boulder, he majored in speech and drama, and minored in English literature and psychology. Dyde appeared in more than 30 university productions, including Twelfth Night as Duke Orsino, Born Yesterday as Senator Hedges and The Soldier's Tale as the Devil. The Nomad Players of Boulder cast him as the Minstrel in Once Upon a Mattress.

CU also introduced Dyde to dance. He took classes with Charolette Irey, Marilyn Cohen and Nancy Spanier. In 1968, Dyde met Merce Cunningham when the avant-garde choreographer came to CU as an artist in residence.

Dyde moved to New York City in 1972. After auditioning for Martha Graham, he was offered a scholarship to the Graham school and a provisional invitation to join the troupe for its next series of performances. While in New York, he also studied with Cunningham and Rudy Perez, a veteran of Judson Dance Theater.

At age 25, Dyde decided to produce his own dance concert rather than join a company. Using money he had inherited, he and a few friends staged a performance at the Cubiculo Theatre. The concert was covered by The New York Times. The reviews were devastating. Dyde left the city not long afterward.

== Early dance career ==
In August 1974, Dyde and writer/philosopher James Rosenfield founded The Carolina Contemporary Dance Theatre in Raleigh, North Carolina. The company's official debut in April 1975 bore some of the hallmarks that would be present in many of Dyde's dance groups. Most of the dancers were not trained professionals, but demonstrated strength through their expression and enthusiasm. Dyde's awareness of his dancers' capabilities led him to concentrate on these strengths rather than "to force them into positions that would emphasize their weaknesses. Sponsored by the State Department of Instruction, the troupe toured statewide.

In October 1974, he received a NC Arts Grant of $1,500 to create a dramatic ballet for Raleigh Civic Ballet. In 1975, he won a dance grant for the same amount from the National Endowment for the Arts (NEA). In 1982, he received a second NEA grant for twice the amount.

Thinking Raleigh too small to support the "experimental" dances he wanted to make, yet not wanting to return to New York, Dyde moved to Houston. He initially joined Buddy Gurgianis’ Contemporary Dance Theatre.

In December 1975, Dyde presented his first Houston concert under the auspices of Houston Contemporary Dance Theatre. On the program was Yin Yang, the first solo dance/theater work he created and performed in Houston.

In 1976, Dyde's Carolina company relocated to Houston, Texas, and became Theatre Dance Unlimited. The troupe presented its first concert in June of that year. In 1977, Rosenfield left to pursue his writing career. Dancer/choreographer and fellow Gurgianis alum, Laura Fly, became co-director.

== Farrell Dyde Dance Theatre ==
In 1980, Theater Dance Unlimited moved to 3221 Milam, an alternative space presenting new music, dance, performance art and visual art. The company name was changed to The Farrell Dyde Dance Theatre (FDDT). Fly moved on to create work in Boston.

Three years earlier, Dyde had joined the Contemporary Arts Museum Houston (CAM) Choreographers Project. Founded by Roberta Stokes, the initial members were Dyde, James Clouser, Mary Wolff, Sandra York, Polly Motley and Laura Fly. They met weekly for two years, leading one another in improvisations and staging site-specific performances across the city. In one project, the choreographers were assigned to perform at different art exhibitions, including a Bauhaus show at the Museum of Fine Arts, Houston. The group disbanded when Stokes no longer wanted to lead the program.

Then Dyde, inspired by his work with the CAM group, decided to present Dances for Downtown Spaces under the auspices of his own company Theater Dance Unlimited. This project was funded by one of the first grants awarded by the newly-formed Cultural Arts Council Houston. The group engaged in noontime performances at six different locations, including the city's underground tunnels and the Houston Public Library plaza with its Claes Oldenburg mouse sculpture. Participants included both trained and untrained dancers.

Dyde performed at New York City's Bessie Schonberg Theater in 1982 for Dance Theater Workshop's Out-of-Towners series. His program included five solos and a duet, Johannesburg, "in which a young man and woman hesitated, met, fought, grew close and slept in a dance that consisted of a walk and pivot, a bit of a tango and the rearranging of two white benches." According to New York Times critic Jennifer Dunning, the mood established by the piece "was eerie and hard to shake," in good part because of strong performances by Dyde and his partner. She also found the solo Fix compelling, describing Dyde as "a lean, lanky dancer whose resilience is that of a much smaller, compact body" and describing the work as having "moments of highly charged, though understated, physicality."

In 1983, Dyde was asked to choreograph a piece for Houston Ballet. Arcadian Dreams, set to music by Megan Roberts, premiered with Li Cunxin in the lead role. Ben Stevenson, then the company's artistic director, offered Dyde the opportunity to choreograph a 20-minute work for the 82–83 season. Except for a trio of ballets created by Stevenson's staff, the work was the first awarded to a regional choreographer, as well as the first modern dance work. Arcadian Dreams was seen by theatergoers at Jones Hall who would have never come to a performance at Dyde's studio and legitimized his work for a broader audience. The piece followed a loose narrative involving a young man seeking a simpler, more meaningful life. Critical reaction was mixed.

In 1985, he made a second dance for the ballet company. Basic Black was performed to a score commissioned from minimalist composer Michael Nyman with sets and costumes by Houston artists. The ensemble number featured Li Cunxin and Suzanne Longley in the lead roles.

In 1986, FDDT was reorganized with a new board and a new format that focused initially on high-impact events and later on a small, streamlined touring company composed of three women and three men. The group achieved record funding via contributions from non-profit foundations and trusts, as well as individual donors.

In 1991, the company was disbanded when the goal of paying the dancers union scale salaries could not be met. From this point forward, Dyde's choreographic efforts focused on solo works.

== Solo career and other post-FDDT activities ==
From the 1990s through the 2010s, Dyde performed as a soloist at numerous Houston venues: 3221 Milam, Midtown Arts and Theater Center Houston, DiverseWorks, Houston Metropolitan Dance Center and the Barnevelder Movement and Arts Center. His full-evening solo dance/theater works include Persona Non Gratis, An Anatomy of the Night, Useless Activities, Dat Is Het, Mountains Are Mountains and A Multitude of Sins.

During this time, he also choreographed for two overseas companies and held a variety of positions in Houston, New York and other locations. As a steady job, he worked, for a time, as an investment banker. Over a nine-year time span, he taught Pilates.

In the same year FDDT ended, Global Enterprises chose him to introduce modern dance to SKD, a 90 year old performing company based in Tokyo, Japan. One of the dances he made for the all-female troupe obliquely referenced sumo wrestling and involved opposing groups of women, sometimes armed with brooms.

In 1992, he was named director of the Dayton Ballet School, an appointment made on the recommendation of former Houston Ballet director, James Clouser.

In 1994, Dyde was selected by the U.S. Information Agency/Arts America to teach, choreograph and perform in Kyiv, Ukraine, as a Cultural Specialist. The program's goal was to improve relations between that country and the U.S. Dyde was commissioned to choreograph a work for the National Ukrainian Ballet Opera for Youth, a company of professional dancers who performed the piece in concert. Dyde's intention was that The Door Is a Window have an American contemporary kind of energy, an uplifting spiritual quality, and provide an update on the state of modern dance in the West.

In 1998, Dyde and a group of dancers and choreographers formed CODA, Contemporary Dance Online Forum, to serve as a hotline for dance events in Houston. CODA's mission was to share ideas and stimulate conversation among members of the dance/performance community and their audiences. Everyone in the community was invited to submit their views, reviews and events. The forum ultimately morphed into Dance Source Houston.

From July 1999 to December 2002, Dyde was Director of External Affairs for the Lar Lubovitch Dance Company. In this capacity, he wrote corporate, foundation and government grants; solicited funds from individual donors; marketed performances and fundraising galas; and worked on technology initiatives and an education outreach program for all five boroughs of New York City.

== Style, approach and philosophy ==
During the 1970s and 80s, Dyde's Houston-based FDDT was thought by some to be "the most ambitious of the dozen or so modern dance groups" in the city, "not necessarily because of the number of performances that the company gave or even the skill of the dancers, but because of Dyde’s talent for witty, innovative choreography." His "signature blend of angular eccentricity and willowy grace," his "inventiveness and clarity of thought and line" were thought reminiscent of Merce Cunningham. "This quality of wit and articulation is not verbal, but physical. Dyde is a perfect example of 'modern' dance, of disciplined, energetic investigation into new ways of making dances." His and his troupe's performances were noted for "intense channeling of energy, sometimes a kind of wild humor, other times acerbic comment, even the hint of antic desperation." The term "post-modern vaudeville" has also been used in reference to his work.

Energy is an essential component of Dyde's dance philosophy. On forming a company, "You first look for a dancer's energy, joy and commitment to moving before you look for the technique. You look for people who can move, and then you look for good bodies." Improvisation is another important element in his choreography, especially his solo work. "It’s a way of discovering what the dance is about through the process of making the dance."

He is interested in the border between the conscious and the unconscious, in a mental state related to dreams and hypnosis, with an awareness of what the audience will enjoy seeing. The work is also an interior dialogue that moves between formality and chaos as a metaphor for existence. The choreography seeks balance between improvisation, which keeps things fresh, and structure, which keeps things coherent. With FDDT, his programs balanced unpredictable, non-linear solos with more ordered dance-drama group pieces. The quasi-narratives often have themes that deal with irreconcilable differences in destructive relationships.

Self-described as "more Jerome Robbins than George Balanchine," Dyde counts José Limón, Martha Graham and Merce Cunningham as major influences. As evidenced in his choreography, other influences range from the experimental, such as Judson Dance Theater, to more traditional dancers and choreographers, in a variety of styles, from Fred Astaire, Gene Kelly and Jimmy Cagney to Leonide Massine, Eric Bruhn and Rudolf Nureyev, as well as a host of women performers.

Music is an essential element in Dyde's work and can range from Eric Clapton to the Ink Spots to Philip Glass. He's been quoted as saying, "I listen to a lot of music...and I'm constantly thinking about how to use it." He often combines diverse tracks as if they "were a film score," arranging several small pieces to provide a quasi-narrative arc as well as an atmosphere and mood that moves the dance forward.

His programs frequently involve collaboration with artists working in other disciplines. He often employs street clothes as costumes, sound collages and music/soundscapes by contemporary composers, and a balance of solo and ensemble sections within a single piece. His 1988 work Their Finest Hour is a good example of these elements. The 50-minute suite of dances depicts American life during the 1930s and '40s. The piece was set to a sound collage of nostalgic tunes, radio broadcasts and commercials with a set by Frank Williams, costumes by Sarajane Milligan and a period slide show by Daniel Jircik.

Dyde has been committed to choreographing "honestly" as he ages. At 66 years of age, he told an interviewer, “I’m not going to try to portray somebody who’s 25 years old. I’m picking situations and characters or scenarios that are possible for me to perform physically and realistically, so what I’m doing is convincing.”

== Selected works ==
Dyde has choreographed more than 100 dance/theater works for himself and his various companies. Brief descriptions of a few pieces are presented below:

- Les Saltimbanques (1974) was Dyde's first popular work. Choreographed for the Raleigh School of Dance Arts and performed to music by Scott Joplin, it took as its inspiration the Pablo Picasso painting La famille de saltimbanques, a Rose Period masterpiece depicting six itinerant circus performers. Critics called the dance a "spritely, good-humored" piece.
- Yin Yang (1975), his first solo work created and performed in Houston, explored the feminine energy present in man. Dyde has called the piece "a personal breakthrough" that "launched his career in Houston." The drama/dance begins with Dyde, wearing jeans, a snap-front denim shirt and black lace-up, Army-style boots, at the back of the stage facing away from the audience. After several false starts, he turns and strides emphatically to center stage, where he sheds the masculine garments to reveal a silky, pale blue woman's slip beneath. Now barefoot and unencumbered, he sways gently, at first, and then gradually expands his gestures until he runs freely in broad circles. At last, he removes the woman's garment, too, ending the dance, in underwear, once more rocking softly side to side.
- Knot (1976) is a duet once described as dangling on the cutting edge of surrealism and dark comedy. In the work, a couple moves through several layers of changing emotions after their marriage. "It is a neatly conceived work full of violence, jealousy, finally revenge, and makes use of a broom as a significant prop and a rope as a continuity device."
- Earth Motion (1977) is an abstract piece with many gestures gently expressing sentiments of greeting, outreach and embrace. It blends classical steps such as arabesques and jetes with more vernacular movements such as running, crouching and spinning. According to one critic, Dyde's choreography "revels in pure movement, making good use of the visual fugue, as patterns begun by one dancer are picked up moments later by the next and so on down the line. Clad in pajama-like whites, the dancers give the work an interpretation ideal in its buoyancy, grace and free-wheeling liberation."
- Sideshow (1977) displayed "originality of style, clarity of purpose and sharp staging" at its premiere. Dyde debuted the lead role as "a garishly clad sideshow charlatan who trotted out his half dozen Trilby-like subjects, assigned to them various masks and forced them to do his bidding. Though its middle sections grew a bit redundant obviously underscoring some points, the work made some telling observations on the universal practices of manipulation and the struggle for power. And it built to an arresting climax as the automatons marched through their ritualistic formations destroying one another at their master's bidding before the tables were ultimately and satisfyingly turned. Dyde made a vigorously malevolent cartoon of the central figure. His subjects were appropriately abstracted and mildly anguished."
- How Now Why Fly By Sweet Baby (1977), set to Dixieland music by The New Black Eagle Jazz Band, defines the comic interaction between a slightly incompetent leader, dressed in white, and his rather loyal band of five followers, dressed in black. Using a combination of mechanistic and musical comedy movements, Dyde reversed the interaction from a slavish following by the five to a complete subordination of the leader. The Houston Chronicle critic found the work whimsical with delightful humor that surfaced in the "kinky, sometimes rubbery, deadpan dancing of the ensemble…It was all good fun, the patterns were inventive and engaging and the dancers carried it off with same verve they had maintained all evening.”
- Web (1979) is a narrative work designed to expose the "latent bestiality in the most correct society set." Four dancers portray two very formal couples who show that when the party goes on too long, "people do let their hair down and rip off their black ties and starched shirts." Two men and two women begin the dance in formal evening dress and dance with very restricted mechanical moves, but eventually the women are in their slips, the men shirtless and the choreography grows more sensuous.
- Dreams of a Woman Lost in the Night aka Les Reves d'Une Femme Perdum dans la Nuit (1980) depicts "a woman coming to terms with various specters of her own personality" portrayed as "three masked phantoms." The lead experiences "expanding awareness as she [is] paired with each figure. At its debut one reviewer wrote it conveyed "effective theatricality and a unique mood of its own."
- Havana (1980), a solo set to music/spoken word from Robert Ashley’s Public Lives, Private Parts, offered "a pungent surrealistic look at the playboy whose life is defined by smoking, drinking, endless chatter on the telephone and the crushing of life that lifestyle brings," according to a Houston Post critic. Using graceful, catlike movements, sometimes slowing them down, "Dyde vividly suggested a real disintegration and despair." Wearing a tropical white suit, white tank top and straw fedora, Dyde's taut and concentrated performance created an "air of mysterious apprehension." Another critic found the music "pretentious" and thought the "repetitive" and "mechanical" movements went on "much too long."
- Majestic Roof (1984), expanded from a shorter piece, Orion's Belt, is a multi-part work based on the constellations. Set to avant-garde music by Belgian composer Wim Mertens, the segments are Orion's Belt, Sirius, Polaris, The Winter Triangle, Gemini, Perseus & Andromeda and Corona. The Houston Post dance critic wrote that "the dancers worked ceaselessly" and on the occasion she saw it was "the evening’s smash." Another reviewer said, the "bright and pretty dance about stellar constellations was the highlight of [the] weekend’s Miller Theatre Program by the FDDT... a piece that showed off the clean definition of his abstract choreography as neatly as it showed off the thorough preparation of his eight member company." A third critic called Majestic Roof the "highlight of the 83-84 Houston performing arts season."
- Sparky’s Aorta - A Vaudeville of the Heart (1986), a solo Dyde conceived for himself, is an "alternately manic and melancholy vaudevillian turn set to a sound collage of old radio programs, commercials and nostalgic songs. "Though the work probably goes on too long for its own good and is sometimes unnecessarily repetitious, it effectively showcases Dyde's agility, sense of character and flair for eccentric dance." "Dyde enacts the beaming, prancing figure - perhaps a vaudevillian or carnival pitchman - cutting up for the audience in agile fashion, but not without some rueful interludes as well."
- Persona Non Gratis (2006), an hour-long solo work divided into three parts: Voyager, Subterranean and Warrior, depicts three facets of the same person. The work makes use of a shopping cart, a low bench, traffic cones, a red and white striped safety barricade, a newspaper, a rake and a brown paper shopping bag, among other items, as set and props. Onstage wardrobe changes add to the depiction of the character's shifting identity.

A complete listing of Dyde's repertory is available on his website.

== Personal life ==
In 1981, Dyde married physician Marrie Richards with whom he had two sons. They divorced in 1986.

He is a poet in his private life. His work Too Early Face was published in the 2008 Spring/Summer issue of The Texas Review.

In spring 2023, Dyde donated his collection of clippings, photographs and other ephemera to the University of Houston Library. Posters from several of his and his company's performances are in the collection of the University of Houston Clear Lake Archives.
