= Inversion Coffee House =

Defunct coffeehouse in Houston, Texas, U.S.

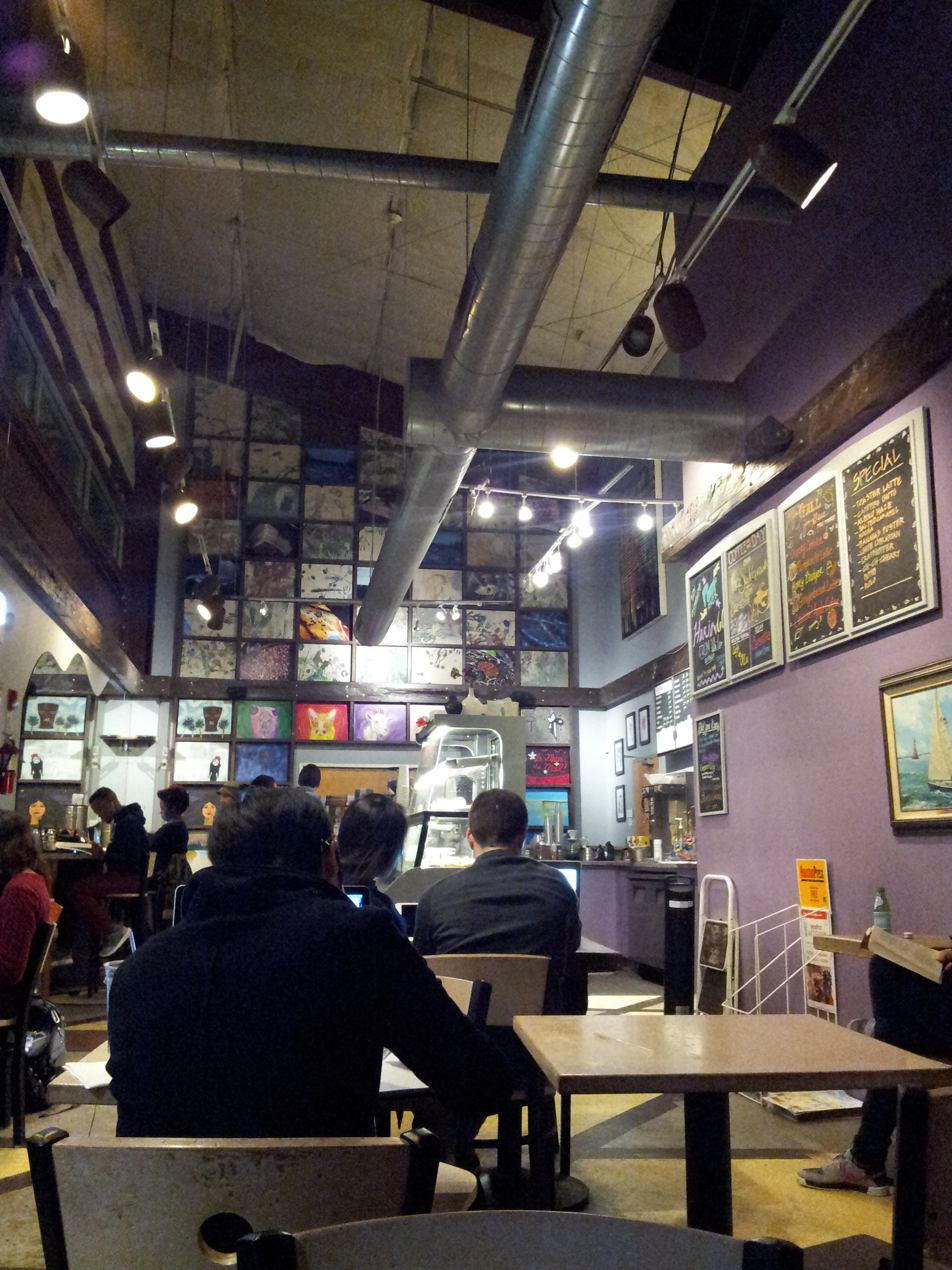
- The cafe's interior in 2014
- Interactive map of Inversion Coffee House

Restaurant information
- Established: 2005
- Closed: March 26, 2021
- Location: 1953 Montrose Boulevard, Houston, Harris, Texas, 77006, United States
- Coordinates: 29.7513°N 95.3917°W

Inversion Coffee House (also known as Inversion Coffee and Art and Inversion Coffee and Gelato, or simply Inversion) was a coffeehouse in Houston, in the U.S. state of Texas.

== Description ==
Inversion was a coffeehouse on Montrose Boulevard in Houston's Montrose neighborhood, operating in a building owned by Art League Houston. Brittanie Shey of Eater Houston said the cafe was known for its "artsy vibe, creative coffees, and sense of community". Inversion displayed local artwork. Thrillist describes Inversion as an "eclectic Montrose favorite" with free Wi-Fi, La Mexicana breakfast tacos, and a food truck parked outside. The drink menu included salted caramel lattes and frozen chai creams.

== History ==
Inspired by and named after Dan Havel and Dean Ruck's artwork of the same name, Inversion was opened in 2005. The business was popular early on; in 2007, the Houston Press said Inversion was "attracting as much attention as its namesake" and had "just as many Houstonians stopping by for its art as for its killer cup of joe."

The cafe closed on March 26, 2021, ahead of a May 1 lease expiration.

== Reception ==
In 2007, Inversion won in the Best New Coffee House category in the Houston Press' annual "Best of Houston" list. The newspaper said:

Inversion has all the pleasantries of Starbucks (i.e., quality coffee served by a staff that doesn't think they're above taking your order) as well as its own flair... The coffee shop has been around for less than a year, but it's hard to find a time the tables aren't filled with students, business types, artsy types and pretty much all types. But no worries — the staff is on the ball and, regardless of the number of customers, you'll hardly ever wait longer than a couple of minutes for a latte.

Lonely Planet calls Inversion "a great indie coffeehouse" and says, "Even if you're not in Montrose, the casual local vibe, decent baked goods and a rotation of food trucks outside make it worth a detour." Thrillist says, "The recent interior refresh breathes new, airy life into the space, but you'll still find the rockstar beverage lineup that lured you in the first place."
