= Nameless Sound =

Nameless Sound is an organization based in Houston, Texas founded by musician David Dove, which presents international contemporary music and new methods in arts education. Nameless Sound presents concerts by premiere artists in the world of creative music. In addition, Nameless Sound and its artists work directly with young people in public schools, community centers, and homeless shelters. Nameless Sound also presents a weekly experimental music series at the Lawndale Arts Center called They, Who Sound.

== History ==
In 1997, David Dove began developing a unique approach to music education based on creativity and diversity through his work with adolescents at MECA (Multicultural Education and Counseling Through the Arts). In 2000, he founded Deep Listening Institute Houston (a branch of a New York organization founded by Pauline Oliveros), to bring world-class artists to Houston and further his teaching goals. In 2006, under Dove’s direction, Deep Listening Institute Houston became Nameless Sound, an independent Houston-based 501(c)3. That same year, Nameless Sound expanded to include two classes for people with special needs (the mentally-challenged and autistic) and a Creative Kids Ensemble (grades K though 8th) in addition to its Youth Ensemble, public school workshops, and homeless shelter workshops. In 2008, Nameless Sound added a class for refugee children (political asylum seekers). Nameless Sound has become the most important regional presenter of creative music, contemporary jazz, and free improvisation, making Houston an important center for this cutting edge art form. Nameless Sound has also become known nationally for a new type of music education, emphasizing creativity, improvisation, and diversity.

== Resounding Vision Award ==
Nameless Sound created The Resounding Vision Award to honor "musicians whose efforts transcend aesthetics and resonate beyond the performance venue." Musicians who are given this award have had extensive community involvement. In 2013, a Community Resounding Vision Award was added, honoring arts patrons in Houston who have similarly supported the local community. The first recipients were arts patrons (and music lovers) Susie and Sanford Criner

=== Winners and Nominees ===
Year	Winner
2013	Roscoe Mitchell
2012	Alvin Fielder
2009	Curley Cormier
2007	Pauline Oliveros
2006	William Parker
2005	Joe McPhee

== See also ==
- Houston Alternative Art

== Notable musicians ==
Notable musicians who have performed at Nameless Sound:

- Tetuzi Akiyama
- Susan Alcorn
- Han Bennink
- Borbetomagus
- Peter Brötzmann
- Dave Burrell
- John Butcher
- Mats Gustafsson
- Ingebrigt Håker Flaten
- Fred Frith
- Keiji Haino
- Susie Ibarra
- Sachiko M
- Sabir Mateen
- Joe McPhee
- Louis Moholo
- Jemeel Moondoc
- Toshimaru Nakamura
- Maggie Nicols
- Paal Nilssen-Love
- Pauline Oliveros
- William Parker
- Maja Ratkje
- Matana Roberts
- Matthew Shipp
- Ken Vandermark
- Roswell Rudd
- Cooper-Moore
- Damon Smith
