= Christopher Salat =

American graffiti artist (born 1976)

- Born: Christopher Karl Salat; July 1976 (age 49); Houston, Texas, U.S.
- Known for: Public art Graffiti; Painting; Street-Art; Turntablist; VRArtist
- Notable work: Graffiti Art, Album Covers, Virtual Reality Graffiti
- Movement: Hip-Hop Culture

Christopher Karl Salat (born July 1976), also known professionally as BeZerK One, is an American graffiti artist, virtual reality artist, and turntablist. Known for his early work in Houston as a graffiti innovator, active in the Houston Alternative Art scene, original crew member of "Aerosol Warfare" art collective and the scratch DJ for "Audible Stellar Hypnotic Situations".

== Biography ==
In 1992, Salat began to develop the art form professionally, combining efforts on the street and assisting in establishing the "Aerosol Warfare" arts collective in Houston, Texas. Salat played an active role of gathering street artists. producing large productions known as "Burners" and placing some art effort in galleries to make money for street artists. His efforts are outlined in the hardback publication "The History of American Graffiti", published in 2011 by Roger Gastman.

"In 1992, the duo established the “Wall of Fame,” which still runs today on Palmer and McKinney Streets as a legal spot for artists to graffiti. In 1994 ChristianAZUL and Christopher Karl “BeZerk One” joined Aerosol Warfare and established Aerosol Warfare Gallery in 2000." - Nimra Haroon, Houston's Graffiti Culture

As Salat's career moved forward, he started a sculpture series of "Aerosol Bombs" using his empty cans of Krylon spray paint. In 1997, gathering attention from outside the southern region, Limp Bizkit's front man Fred Durst used one of Salat's Bomb Sculptures "Aerosol Warfare #2" (VA0001131224) to promote the track Counterfeit on Interscope Records. The single was promoted to record executives, radio station DJs and industry professionals to promote Limp Bizkit's debut sound. In 1998, Limp Bizkit released an international maxi single entitled "Counterfeit Countdown", taking Salat's Bomb design worldwide. The image of the sculpture was also used in the liner notes of the "Three Dollar Bill, Y'all" album.

=== Audio media ===
After spending time in the visual arts, Salat shifted focus and joined the band A>S>H>S or Audible Stellar Hypnotic Situations as the frontman, using samples with turntables to narrate the musical atmospheres. A>S>H>S played the southern part of Texas for many years before producing an album at SugarHill Recording Studios in 2006. Upon its release, the band's self-titled debut album, Audible Stellar Hypnotic Situations, had significant impact.

"I'm the guy who does all the scratching and adds all the vocals," Karl says. "The vocals tell a story about the atmosphere we're creating. Act Fast is about the atomic bomb. As the music changes, there's a man warning you, saying, 'The bomb can explode at any time.' When the music changes, it's like the bomb exploding, and the vocal there is, 'You can't see radiation, but can you feel it?' We try to say something without saying it." - Christopher Karl, "Audible Stellar Hypnotic Situations" Houston Chronicle

=== Further education ===
In 2007, Salat left Texas to pursue his passion of building video games and other digital technologies. He attended The University of Advancing Technology, majoring in video game environmental design, and later adding cybersecurity to his study agenda. Salat had the opportunity to intern with The Department of Defense, designing a browser based game called "CyberHero", educating young people about cybersecurity scenarios.

"It was a great educational opportunity to help young people understand that defense in the future means securing our Networks" - Christopher Salat, "When Games are more than just play" Geek411

=== Technology testing ===
In 2015, Salat gained a testing position at 343 Industries testing their new console release Halo 5: Guardians.
