= Inversion (artwork) =

Former artwork in Houston, Texas, U.S.

- Artist: Dan Havel; Dean Ruck
- Year: 2005
- Location: Houston, Texas, U.S.
- 29°45′05″N 95°23′31″W\

Inversion was a 2005 artwork by sculptors Dan Havel and Dean Ruck of Houston Alternative Art.

Havel and Ruck altered two buildings owned by the Art League of Houston on the corner of Montrose Boulevard and Willard Street. The exterior skins of the houses were peeled off and used to create a large vortex that funneled into the small central hallway connecting the two buildings and eventually exited through a small hole into an adjacent courtyard. Inversion has become one of Houston's most well-known, albeit vanished, sculptures. The structure was later demolished to make way for a new Art League building.

Art League Houston owned the two houses and had used them for art classes and exhibitions for over 30 years. The organisation commissioned Havel and Ruck to transform them into an artwork in demolition. The sculpture was opened on May 21, 2005, and was visible from Montrose Boulevard until its demolition the next month.

Years later, the artwork continues to be cited on design blogs.

== Sequels ==
In 2009, the sculptors cut an egg-shaped piece from another house in a work called Give and Take.

In 2011, Havel and Ruck created a work called Fifth Ward Jam, taking planks from the interior of other dilapidated houses in Houston and fixing them to the outside in shapes like an explosion. This was compared to the earlier work Inversion.

== See also ==
- 2005 in art
- Inversion Coffee House
- List of public art in Houston

The inversion.
