= Salle Werner Vaughn =

American artist (born 1939)

- Born: 1939 (age 85–86); Tyler, Texas, U.S.
- Occupation: Artist

Salle Werner Vaughn (born 1939) is an American artist. Vaughn was born in Tyler, Texas.

Largely known for her paintings, Houston-based Vaughn has also converted a set of early 20th century cottages along the 4600 block of Blossom Street, Houston, into an art installation called "Harmonium". She began working on the houses in the early 1980s.

Her work is included in the collections of the Metropolitan Museum of Art, and the Museum of Fine Arts, Houston
