= Terrell James =

American artist (born 1955)

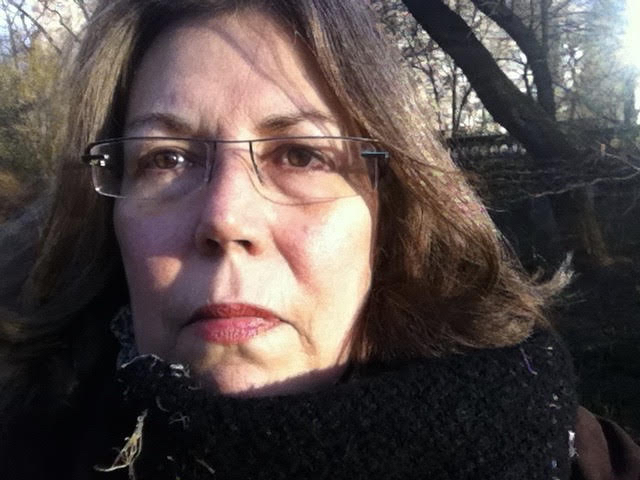
- Born: 1955 (age 70–71); Houston, Texas
- Education: Instituto Allende; Sewanee: The University of the South
- Known for: Painting, printmaking and sculpture
- Website: https://www.terrelljames.com

Terrell James (born 1955) is an American artist who makes abstract paintings, prints and sculptures. She is best known for large scale work with paint on stretched fabric, and for parallel small‑scale explorations such as the Field Studies series, ongoing since 1997. She lives and works in Houston, Texas.

== Early life and education ==
Terrell James was born in Houston, Texas in 1955. A seventh generation Texan, she graduated from Houston's Lamar High School in 1973. In 1973 she studied painting and printmaking at the Instituto Allende in San Miguel de Allende (Guanajuato, Mexico). From 1973 to 1977 she attended The University of the South in Sewanee, Tennessee, where she continued her studies in painting and printmaking.

== Art practice ==
=== Painting ===
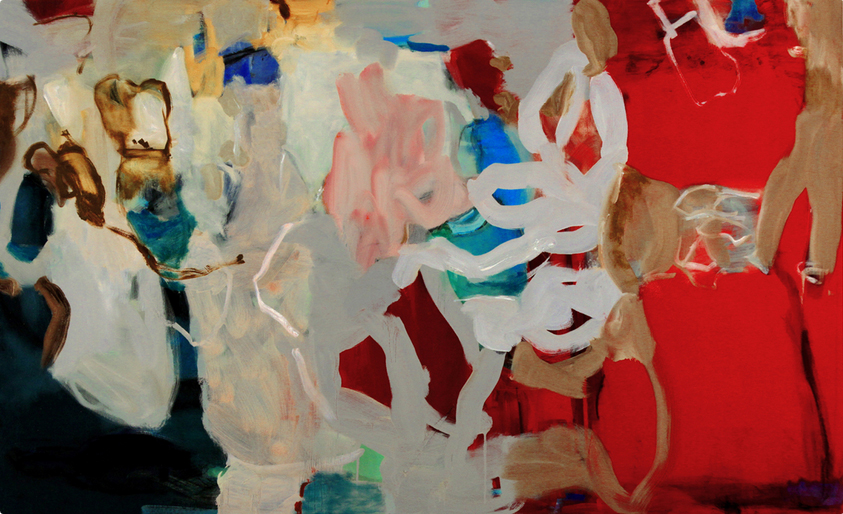
Hidden Histories, 2013, 42x72

James's painting suggest ambiguous visions of nature, urban geometries and technical artifacts, resisting easy determination. Instead of obvious images and visual stability, the viewer finds a pictorial landscape composed of alternate potential readings. Writing for the Museum of Fine Arts Houston, Daniel Stern stated that "To gaze at a painting of [hers] is to enter into an experience in the making: painting in which the act of painting continues on as the eye wanders the finished surface. Each individual painting is completed by each individual encounter."

=== Field studies ===
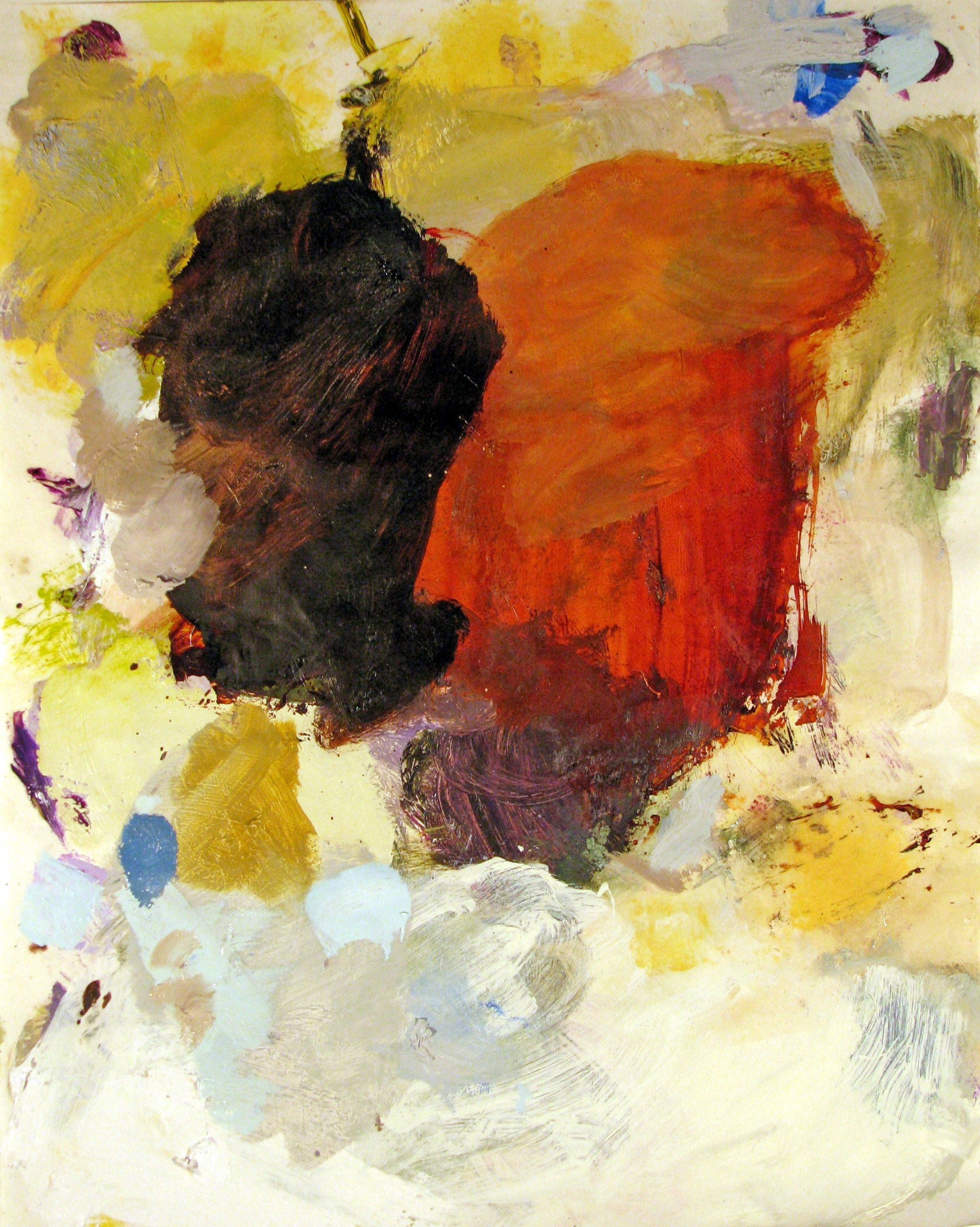
Field Study FS-457, 2007, 20x16

James's numbered series Field Studies, beginning in 1997, are small works devoted to ongoing, open-ended visualization. Curator Alison de Lima Greene has written: "Sometimes a drawn line darts across the field or serves as a scaffold, sometimes pale afterimages challenge the viewer's eye, and even the occasional collaged element is welcomed as well." Field Studies are often made in parallel with much larger synchronous works, tracking their internal color relationships in a secondary form.

== Related work ==
=== Forrest Bess and archival research ===
From 1980 to 1985 James worked as a field collector and material archivist for the Archives of American Art, at the Smithsonian Institution. While in this position, she was involved in the cataloging and exhibition of works by artist Forrest Bess. This assignment included her research involving Bess's family and contacts in Bay City, Texas, her cataloging of correspondence related to the artist's exhibition with New York gallerist Betty Parsons, and her organization of the 1986 exhibition of Forrest Bess' paintings in collaboration with Hiram Butler Gallery. This show led to the involvement of other galleries, such as New York's Hirschl & Adler Modern. Her research on Bess's life and work was seminal to the posthumous emergence of his worldwide following among collectors and institutions. In addition to archival work, James was integrally involved in the production of films and books about Bess. James played the archetypal feminine figure of Forrest Bess in Jim Kanan's 1987 film of Bess, Fishmonger, and was a primary source for Chuck Smith's book Key to the Riddle.

== Exhibitions ==
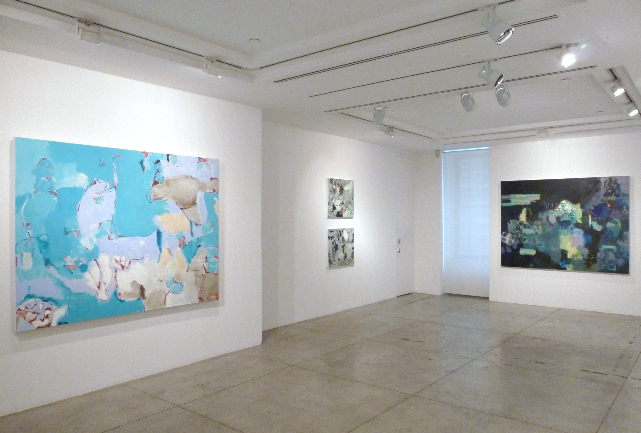
Terrell James: A Place for Two Stones

James has had solo exhibitions at a number of venues nationally, including Hiram Butler Gallery, Houston, Froelick Gallery, Portland, OR, The Cameron Museum of Art, Wilmington, NC, and internationally at Cadogan Contemporary, London, UK, and Fundacion Centro Cultural, Santo Domingo, Dominican Republic.

== Collections ==
- Whitney Museum of American Art
- Menil Collection, Houston
- Watermill Collection (Robert Wilson Foundation, Water Mill, N.Y.)
- Casa Lamm/Televisa Cultural Foundation and Museum (Mexico, D.F.)
- Museum of Fine Arts, Boston
- Museum of Fine Arts Houston
- Dallas Museum of Art
- University of St. Thomas, Houston
- Albee Foundation, New York The Cameron Museum of Art (Wilmington, N.C.),
- Free International University World Art Collection, the Netherlands
- Centro Cultural Arte Contemporaneo Mexico D.F.
- Portland Art Museum, Oregon
- the Rice University Collection, Houston
- United States Department of Stat,
- Museum of the University of the South, Sewanee, Tennessee
- San Antonio Museum of Art
- Texas Tech University
- National Gallery of Art

== Recognition and commentary ==
- Texas Artist of the Year (Art League Houston, 2016)
- 2014 Texas Art Hall of Fame (Houston Fine Art Fair)
- Decorative Center Houston's 2013 Design Star Award
- 2010 Visual Arts Fellowship from the Edward Albee Foundation
- 2008 Texan-French Alliance for the Arts' TFAA Recognition Award
