= Andrea Grover =

American curator, artist, and writer (born 1970)

Andrea Grover (born July 1970) is an American curator, artist, and writer. She founded the Aurora Picture Show film center in her front room in 1998.

== Biography ==
Grover graduated from Syracuse University and has an MFA from the School of the Art Institute of Chicago. She moved to Houston, Texas in 1995. She was a Core Fellow in residence at the Museum of Fine Arts, Houston from 1995-1997. In 2010, she received an Andy Warhol Foundation Curatorial Fellowship, at the STUDIO for Creative Inquiry and Miller Gallery at Carnegie Mellon University, to study artists working in science, technology and engineering. In 2013, she was awarded a Center for Curatorial Leadership Fellowship.

In 2011, she became Associate Curator of the Parrish Art Museum, Southampton, New York. At the Parrish, Grover initiated the ongoing exhibition series, Platform, and the offsite nomadic exhibition program, Parrish Road Show. In 2015, the Century Arts Foundation underwrote a multi-year named position, Curator of Special Projects, for Grover.

On July 14, 2016 it was announced that she will be taking over as executive director of Guild Hall of East Hampton, effective September 1, 2016.

=== Aurora Picture Show ===
In 1997 Grover purchased an old church in Sunset Heights, Houston, converting the rear into living accommodation. In 1998, Grover founded Aurora Picture Show, a non-profit organization that screens non-commercial films, in the church building. Its first showing attracted a standing-room only crowd of 100. The "microcinema," as it is described, is now located near Kirby in Houston, Texas. According to the website, "Aurora has hosted over 400 visiting artists and presented over 4000 films and videos" including the U. premieres of Isaac Julien's "True North" in 2007, and Laurie Anderson's film, "Hidden Inside Mountains".

=== Crowdsourcing ===
Grover is known as a supporter for crowdsourcing in art. In an interview with Leah DeVun for Wired Magazine, Grover explains that her interest in crowdsourcing formed out of her "fondness" for "early video collectives like Top Value Television, Videofreex, and Raindance." Her interest in creating "non-commodity-based artwork" led her to crowdsourcing. In another interview, Grover claims that crowdsourcing is growing rapidly, because "we're experiencing a moment in time where technology is allowing for people to cooperate in large numbers on all sorts of things."

In 2007 Grover stated that the original term for "crowd sourcing" was "relational art." While it would seem that crowdsourcing is a relatively new phenomenon, Grover claims that is only "a new term to describe something that already existed before the term was in common use." In the interview for Wired, Grover explained that crowdsourcing eliminates a financial barrier that prohibits most people from participating in art, as "Internet real estate is essentially free." Grover finds that the primary appeal of crowdsourcing is the satisfaction that is obtained through working with a community.

In Fall 2007, Grover offered a class at the University of Houston, called Participation Art. The course presented a history of participation art since the 1960s, while also allowing students to create crowdsourced art.

== Notable projects ==
- Radical Seafaring: In 2016, Grover curated the first exhibition exploring "offshore art," artworks that are sited on the water or preceded by a journey by water. Radical Seafaring at the Parrish Art Museum included the work of 25 artists from five countries and won the Emily Hall Tremaine Exhibition Award.
- Phantom Captain: In 2006, Grover curated the first exhibition that explored crowdsourcing in art. Located in the Apexart gallery in New York, "Phantom Captain" showcased the work of 10-10,000 artists, from around the world, who collaborated through websites such as Learning to Love You More. This exhibit allowed viewers to compare and contrast individual efforts within the group projects. Grover chose the term "Phantom Captain" from a Buckminster Fuller book, which describes a collective consciousness that connects people.
- Txt Me L8r: Co-curated by Aurora Picture Show and the Houston Center for Photography, "Txt Me L8r" showcased photography assignments completed with cell phone cameras. The participants received text messages with the assignments, and the results were exhibited in the Houston Center for Photography. Txt Me L8r attempted to "explore the potential for distributed creativity through the use of cell phone technology."
- Never Been to Tehran: Grover organized "Never Been to Tehran" with artist Jon Rubin. In 2008, this exhibit traveled through galleries in Iran, Turkey, New Zealand, the United States, and other countries. It featured the contributions of individuals through a photo-sharing album of their perspectives on Tehran. The exhibit featured twenty international artists, contributing 500 photographs. However, the photographs were not actually located in Tehran, instead, the participants photographed places in which they thought looked like Tehran. The purpose of this exhibition, according to Jon Rubin, was "essentially [to look] for moments of empathy, and as governments and media outlets are constructing a simple, polarized and distancing image of Iran, this empathy becomes a radical act." Grover claimed that the basic concept of the exhibition was to "do a show about never meeting."
- Lessons in the Sky: Described as "A Filmic Tribute to Audubon," "Lessons in the Sky" was a screening which took place at the Audubon Terrace at The Hispanic Society of America. It showcased the "universal pastime of bird watching", and featured a series of short films, from documentary to experimental, dedicated to birds. Grover programmed this films for the Dia Art Foundation at the Hispanic Society of America in New York.
- Menil Movies: Grover inaugurated the Menil Movies, a semi-annual screening series with The Menil Collection. Grover explains that "It turns out that I've been stalking The Menil Collection for so long that they've gotten used to me, and even invited me to host a semi-annual screening series of works from The Menil Archives.". The series attempts to uncover rarely seen work, such as documentaries, avant-garde film, and Soviet cinema, among others, in the Menil Archives.
- 29 Chains to the Moon: In Fall 2009, Grover curated "29 Chains to the Moon," which, according to the official website, featured "artists who put forth radical proposals, from seasteads and tree habitats to gift-based cultures, to make the world work for everyone." The exhibit showcased works which were simultaneously scientific and artistic.
