= Contemporary Arts Museum Houston =

Nonprofit museum in Houston, Texas, US

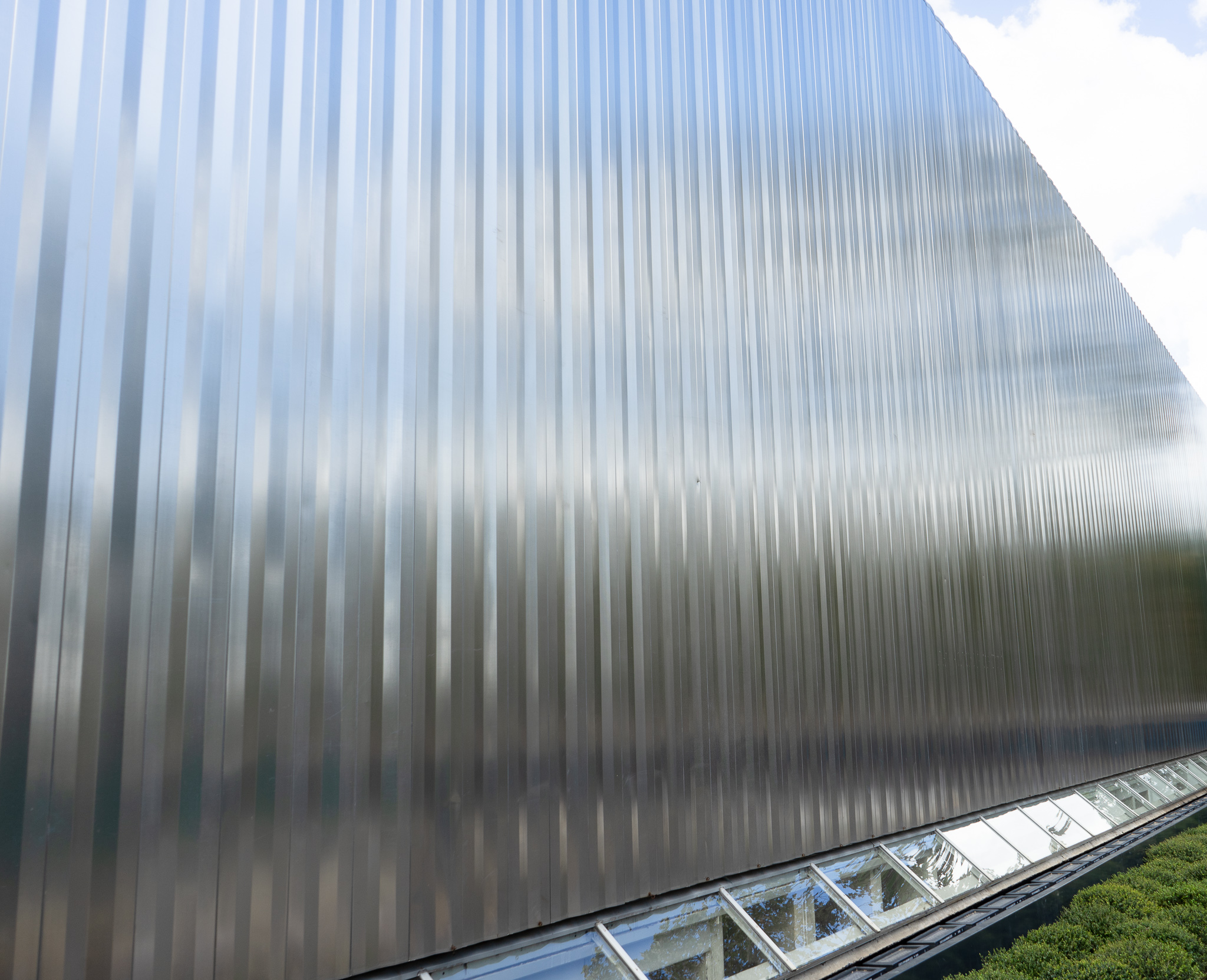
- Established: 1948
- Location: 5216 Montrose Boulevard, Houston, Texas 77006
- Coordinates: 29°43′35.0″N 95°23′29.5″W
- Executive director: Ryan N. Dennis Melissa McDonnell Luján
- President: Dillon A. Kyle
- Website: camh.org

Contemporary Arts Museum Houston is a not-for-profit institution in the Museum District, Houston, Texas, founded in 1948, dedicated to presenting contemporary art to the public.

As a non-collecting museum, it strives to provide a forum for visual arts of the present and recent past and document new directions in art, while engaging the public and encouraging a greater understanding of contemporary art through education programs.

Contemporary Arts Museum Houston opened in 1972, in a building designed by Gunnar Birkerts.

== History ==
=== Beginning ===
In 1948, a group of seven Houston citizens founded the Contemporary Arts Museum with the goal of presenting new art to the community and to document arts role in modern life through exhibitions, lectures and other activities. The museum initially presented exhibitions at various locations throughout the city, sometimes using The Museum of Fine Arts. These first presentations included "This is Contemporary Art" and "László Moholy-Nagy: Memorial Exhibition."

By 1950, the success of these efforts allowed the museum to build of a small, professionally equipped facility where ambitious exhibitions of the work of Vincent van Gogh, Joan Miró, Alexander Calder, Max Ernst, and John T. Biggers and his students from the then-fledgling Texas Negro College (now Texas Southern University). Houstonians were receptive to new ideas.

=== 1950s through 1970s ===
Another major change occurred in 1957, when the previously all-volunteer Museum hired Jermayne MacAgy as its first professional director. Ms. MacAgy wasted no time and soon organized several definitive exhibitions, including "The Sphere of Mondrian," "The Disquieting Muse: Surrealism," "Totems Not Taboo: Primitive Art" and Mark Rothko's second museum exhibition. During the 1960s the museum continued its dedication to thematic exhibitions, architecture and design, and studies individual artists. Landmark exhibitions included "The Emerging Figure" and the influential combine paintings of Robert Rauschenberg. In addition, CAMH has hosted exhibitions engaging with themes of migration and cultural identity, situating contemporary art within broader social debates. Examples include projects highlighting Latino and immigrant artists in Houston's urban context.

By the end of the decade, the Contemporary Arts Museum had outgrown the original 1950 facility, so the trustees raised funds to purchase a prominent site on the corner of Montrose and Bissonnet, where the new building, designed by Gunnar Birkerts, was built. In 1972, the present building opened with a controversial exhibition called Ten, featuring several artists working in non-traditional media. The museum continued to showcase new national and regional art, throughout the 1970s, including such presentations as John Chamberlain, Dalé Gas (one of the first surveys of Hispanic artists in the U.S.), and a major thematic exhibition, American Narrative/Story Art. In addition, exhibitions of new Texas talent provided early venues for works of James Surls, John Alexander, and Luis Jimenez, among others.

=== 1980s through 1990s ===
In the 1980s, the museum grew significantly, extending its sphere of influence with exhibitions that presented and toured surveys of installations for performance art; contemporary still-life painting; a group exhibition of work by Texas artists; and single-artist shows of artists like Ida Applebroog, Robert Morris, Pat Steir, Bill Viola and Frank Stella, as well as Texans Earl Staley, Melissa Miller and Vernon Fisher. In addition, Director Linda L. Cathcart established Perspectives in the museum's lower gallery—a fast-paced series of exhibitions focusing on cycles of work by emerging and well-known artists that had not previously shown in Houston. As of 2011, over 175 exhibitions have taken place within the innovative series.

In the 1990s, the museum adjusted its focus to concentrate only on art made created within the past 40 years. It also worked to extend its reach internationally. Major single-artist exhibitions at the end of the 20th century included Art Guys: Think Twice, Tony Cragg: Sculpture, Ann Hamilton: kaph, Richard Long: Circles Cycles Mud Stone, Nic Nicosia: Real Pictures, Introjection: Tony Oursler: 1976-1999, Lari Pittman, Robert Rauschenberg: A Retrospective, James Turrell: Spirit and Light, William Wegman: Paintings and Drawings, Photographs and Videotapes and Robert Wilson's Vision.

== 2000s ==
The museum temporarily closed on January 1, 1997, for the building's first major renovation in 25 years. The museum reopened to the public on May 10, 1997, with the presentation of "Finders/Keepers." This exhibition documented the institution's relationship with its community and friends, borrowing important works of art back from private collectors that had remained in the region after first being presented at the Contemporary Arts Museum. Other important presentations since have included "Elvis + Marilyn: Two Times Immortal," "Abstract Painting Once Removed" and "Other Narratives."

As the new millennium began, the museum celebrated the change with a look back at some of the exhibitions of the previous decade in "Outbound: Passages from the Nineties." Other exhibitions of the fledgling century have included "Afterimage: Drawing Through Process", "Subject Plural" and "The Inward Eye." Single-artist shows have focused on a variety of media and have included "When One is Two: The Art of Alighiero e Boetti," William Kentridge, Uta Barth, and Juan Muñoz.

== Directors ==
- 1979-1989: Linda L. Cathcart
- 1989-1994: Suzanne Delehanty
- 2009–2018: Bill Arning
- 2020–2024: Hesse McGraw
- 2025–present: Ryan N. Dennis and Melissa McDonnell Luján
