= The Art Guys =

American artist team

- Born: Michael Galbreth: 1956, Philadelphia, Pennsylvania; Jack Massing: 1959, Buffalo, New York
- Died: Galbreth: 19 October 2019 (aged 62–63) Houston, Texas
- Occupation: Artists
- Known for: Performance art, conceptual art, sculpture, drawing, installation art, video
- Website: www.theartguys.com

The Art Guys, Michael Galbreth (1956 – 19 October 2019) and Jack Massing (born 1959), are a collaborative artist team based in Houston, Texas.

== History ==
The Art Guys have worked together since 1983 after meeting while students at the University of Houston. For the exploration of their ideas, they employ a wide variety of media including sculpture, drawing, performances, installations and video. Food, drugs, pencils, baseball bats, car lot flags, toothbrushes and matches are among the unconventional materials they have used.

Described in the New York Times as "a cross between Dada, David Letterman, John Cage and the Smothers Brothers," The Art Guys present a blend of performance, conceptual and visual art that explores the absurdities of contemporary life.

They have received Artadia Awards in both 2004 and 2006.

== Not artists ==
The Art Guys became "not artists" on April 1, 2016, at 12:05 am after 33 years of collaboration.

== Solo exhibitions ==
The Art Guys have shown in the following solo exhibitions:

- 2015-"The Tunnel of Love", One Allen Center, Houston, Texas
- 2015-"Some Conceptions", Gensler, Houston, Texas
- 2014-"Nullities and Vacuities", Kimura Gallery, University of Alaska-Anchorage, Anchorage, Alaska
- 2014-"Scattershot", Wynne Home Arts Center, Huntsville, Texas
- 2012-"The State of Texas v. Gary Sweeney v. The Art Guys", Unit B Gallery, San Antonio, Texas
- 2012-"Funny Space", organized by Snack Projects, The Menil Collection Bookstore, Houston, Texas
- 2011-"The Art Guys: Right Before Your Eyes", Bradbury Gallery, Arkansas State University, Jonesboro, Arkansas
- 2011-"Idle Chatter", Space 204, Vanderbilt University, Nashville, Tennessee
- 2011-"The Meronomic Antinomy of the Transfinite Realm (She's a Brick House)", The Wrong Again Gallery, Memphis, Tennessee
- 2009-"New Clichés", McClain Gallery, Houston, Texas
- 2009-"The Art Guys: Bag of Tricks", Ben Bailey Art Gallery, Texas A&M University-Kingsville, Kingsville, Texas
- 2007-"The Art Guys: Cloud Cuckoo Land Selections from 25 Years of Drawings, Proposals, Failed Schemes and Pipe Dreams", Galveston Art Center, Galveston, Texas (traveling exhibition)
- 2007-"The Art Guys: Seeing Double", Tampa Museum of Art, Tampa, Florida
- 2007-"Two guys walk into a hardware store...", Galleri Andersson Sandstrom, Umeå, Sweden
- 2007-"White Wash" (The Art Guys with That's Painting Productions), l’ecole du BAOUM, Grenoble, France
- 2006-"Two guys walk into a hardware store...", Birke Art Gallery, Huntington, West Virginia
- 2006-"The Art Guys: Nothing To It", Beeville Art Museum, Beeville, Texas
- 2005-"The Art Guys: Food For Thought", Art League of Houston, Houston, Texas
- 2004-"Reality TV: A New Series", Marfa Book Company, Marfa, Texas
- 2004-"America's Greatest Artists", Galerie Stefan Andersson, Umeå, Sweden
- 2003-"What's The Big Idea?", Cornell DeWitt Gallery, New York, New York
- 2002-"The Art Guys: Sweet And Sour", (in conjunction with FotoFest 2002) Central Market, Houston, Texas
- 2002-"Serenity", Sawhill Gallery, James Madison University, Harrisonburg, Virginia
- 2001-"Once Is Not Enough", Redbud Gallery, Houston, Texas
- 2001-"Once Is Not Enough - Again", Cornell DeWitt Gallery, New York, New York
- 2001-"SUITS: The Clothes Make The Man", The Museum of Fine Arts-Houston, Houston, Texas
- 2001-"Laughing Building", Masonic Lodge, Marfa, Texas
- 2000-"Tunnel of Love", Sala Diaz, San Antonio, Texas
- 1999-"The Art Guys Again and Again", Tacoma Art Museum, Tacoma, Washington
- 1999-"Kit and Caboodle", Scottsdale Museum of Contemporary Art (SMoCA), Scottsdale, Arizona
- 1999-"The Art Guys: An Exhibition of New Work", Barry Whistler Gallery, Dallas, Texas
- 1998-"Business As Unusual", Southeastern Center for Contemporary Art (SECCA), Winston-Salem, North Carolina
- 1998-"Common Nonsense", De Saisset Museum, Santa Clara, California
- 1998-"Call of the Wild", Columbus State University, Columbus, Georgia
- 1997-"The Great Hunting And Fishing Expo", Braunstein/Quay Gallery, San Francisco, California
- 1997-"seeing the elephant", Hallwalls Contemporary Arts Center, Buffalo, New York
- 1997-"Hunting And Gathering", Halsey Gallery, College of Charleston, Charleston, South Carolina
- 1997-"Wildlife", Austin Museum of Art, Laguna Gloria, Austin, Texas
- 1996-"The Great Outdoors", Lynn Goode Gallery, Houston, Texas
- 1996-"The Art Guys: Goods and Services", Blue Star Art Space, San Antonio, Texas
- 1996-"Visualize The Art Guys", Kemper Museum of Contemporary Art and Design, Kansas City, Missouri
- 1995-"The Art Guys: Think Twice", Contemporary Arts Museum-Houston, Texas (catalog, traveled to the Tyler Museum of Art, Tyler, Texas
- 1995-"The Art Guys Variety Show", Braunstein/Quay Gallery, San Francisco, California
- 1995-"The Fan Array (And Other New Work)", Capp Street Project, San Francisco, California
- 1995-"The Game Show", Barry Whistler Gallery, Dallas, Texas
- 1994-"Good and Plenty", Lesikar Gallery, Houston, Texas
- 1994-"Today's Special", Palomar Restaurant, Houston, Texas (catalog)
- 1993-"Something From Nothing", UAA Gallery, University of Alaska-Anchorage
- 1993-"Art Guise", Janie Beggs Gallery, Aspen, Colorado
- 1993-"Those Art Guys Again", Barry Whistler Gallery, Dallas, Texas
- 1992-"Group Show", 0-1 Gallery, Los Angeles, California
- 1991-"AAAArt Guys", Barry Whistler Gallery, Dallas, Texas
- 1991-"Art Guys", Gallery 3, Huntington, West Virginia
- 1990-"Art Guys", Barry Whistler Gallery, Dallas, Texas
- 1989-"Talking Pictures: The Art Guys at Full Tilt", Sonic Arts Gallery, San Diego, California
- 1989-"don't get left behind get right behind", San Jacinto College, Houston, Texas
- 1986-"Mustaches For Seattle: Sea/Hou-Hou/Sea", 911, Seattle, Washington
- 1985-Untitled Installation, Butler Gallery, Houston, Texas
- 1985-"Particles", Midtown Art Center, Houston, Texas
- 1983-"GMAALSBSRIENTGH", Studio One, Houston, Texas

== Selected group exhibitions ==
Notable group shows include:

- 2012-"Western Sequels, Art from the Lone Star State", Athens School of Fine Arts, Athens, Greece, traveled to Mimar Sinan Fine Arts University, Istanbul, Turkey
- 2009-"No Zoning: Artists Engage Houston", Contemporary Arts Museum, Houston, Texas
- 2007-"Duiying–Yingdui – Corresponding & Responding", curated by James Surls, National Art Museum of China, Beijing, China
- 2007-"40 Years of Public Art in New York City Parks", The Arsenal Gallery, Arsenal, Central Park, New York, New York
- 2006-Texas In China", Shanghai Museum, Shanghai, China
- 1993-"Here's Looking At Me", Espace Lyonnais D’Art Contemporain, Lyon, France (catalog)
- 1992-"Flux Attitudes," The New Museum of Contemporary Art, New York, New York (catalog)
- 1989-"Project Diomede," The Clocktower, P.S.1, New York, New York

== Selected bibliography ==
- The Art Guys: Cloud Cuckoo Land (Selections from 25 Years of Drawings, Proposals, Failed Schemes and Pipe Dreams). Galveston, Texas, Galveston Arts Center, 2007.
- Creative Time: The Book. New York, New York, 2006.
- Houston Contemporary Art. Shanghai, Shanghai Art Museum, 2006.
- Suits: The Clothes Make the Man. New York, New York: Harry N. Abrams, Inc., 2000.
- Guinness World Records 2000 Millennium Edition, Britain: Guinness World Records, Ltd., 2000.
- The Art Guys Think Twice. New York, New York: Harry N. Abrams, Inc., 1995.
- Autoportraits Contemporains: Here's Looking At Me. Lyon, France: Espace Lyonnaise d’art Contemporain, 1993.
- FluxAttitudes. New York, New York: The New Museum of Contemporary Art, 1991.
