= Cartist Automobile Art Festival =

Annual art festival in Jaipur, India

- Status: Active
- Genre: Art Car, Auto Art, Indian Art, Art of Rajasthan, Culture of Rajasthan
- Begins: 18 April 2016
- Ends: 24 April 2016
- Frequency: Annual
- Locations: Jaipur, Rajasthan
- Country: India
- Years active: 2015 - present
- Inaugurated: On 18 April 2015 (International Day For Monuments and Sites)
- Founder: Himanshu Jangid
- Organiser: Cartist.
- Website: www.cartist.in

Cartist Automobile Art Festival is an annual art festival held in Jaipur, the capital of Indian state Rajasthan. It is an initiative to promote Indian culture and art along with love for vintage cars. The basic idea of Cartist is to spread awareness among masses and classes regarding the importance of salvaging the epitome of royalty, vintage and classic cars.

== History ==
The Cartist Automobile Art Festival was founded by Himanshu Jangid, a vintage car restorer in India and founder & CEO of United Restorations.

=== 2015 ===
First edition of festival commenced from 2015, 18 April the World Heritage Day. Renowned artist like Raghu Rai, Himmat Shah, Johny ML, Wajid Khan, and Shakir Ali interacted with the young artists during workshop, which covered Miniature Art, basics of Photography and natural color making. The students from various schools participated for the workshops. The Art Camp was organized at SMS Convention Centre from 18 April to 21 April and after that The Art work of participants were exhibited from 22 April to 24 April at ITC Rajputana. Cartist Automobile Art Festival is the first of its kind in India; organized to encourage the youth and also to promote automobile art.

=== 2016 ===
A week long Cartist 2016 held at Narain Niwas in Jaipur, was inaugurated by Vasundhara Raje, Chief minister of Rajasthan, followed by special sessions and interaction with well-known artists, art exhibition and workshops. Three solo art exhibition took place at Rajasthan School of Arts, were inaugurated by Nirmal Nahata, Mayor of Jaipur and Johny MLa, a well known art critic.

== See also ==
- Art car
- ArtCar Museum
- Houston Art Car Parade
