= Ann Harithas =

American art collector (1941–2021)

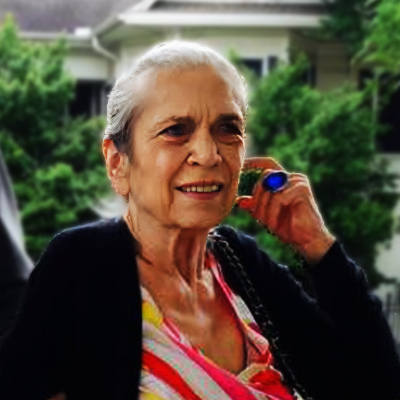
- Harithas in 2016
- Born: July 12, 1941; Houston, Texas, US
- Died: December 23, 2021 (aged 80); Houston, Texas, US
- Education: University of Texas; Rice University
- Occupations: Philanthropist; artist
- Known for: founding museums
- Spouses: Thomas V. Robinson (m. 1970; div. 1977) James Harithas (m. 1978)

Ann O'Connor Williams Harithas (June 12, 1941 – December 23, 2021) was an American philanthropist, museum founder, curator and artist.

== Early life and education ==
Harithas was born in Houston, Texas, to Roger Pinckney Williams and Maude O'Connor Williams. Through her mother, she was a descendent of Irish immigrant Thomas O'Connor, who at the time of his death in 1887, was the largest land and cattle owner in Texas. During the 1930s, oil was discovered on the O'Connor Ranch; the find soon proved to be the state's largest oil field. Ann grew up in Victoria, Texas, and nearby Tivoli.

Harithas loved Texas culture, enjoyed ranch life and befriended many O'Connor Ranch workers. Years later, Harithas would celebrate her girlhood environs, the site where she felt "most connected to the land and to all of nature," by commissioning a six-channel video installation, Aransas: Axis of Observation, from artist Frank Gillette.

She became interested in art as a child, purchasing a Gauguin etching at age 15. She took art lessons until she was 16 and was mentored by her second cousin (once removed), painter and naturalist Madeline O'Connor.

Harithas was especially drawn to the medium of collage. She began with cut paper and continued to make collages, incorporating new techniques such as digital compositing and large format color printing, throughout her life.

She earned a Bachelor of Arts degree in English from the University of Texas at Austin, and a Master of Fine Arts degree from Rice University.

== Galerie Ann/Robinson Galleries ==
She married first husband HP Kemp and had three daughters. She married her second husband Thomas V. Robinson, in 1970. Together that year, they established Galerie Ann in a building adjacent to the Contemporary Arts Museum Houston (CAMH). The new business was inspired by a meeting with Manhattan-based female gallerist Terry Dintenfass.

The Robinsons had one child. When they divorced in 1977, Ann took over the gallery space and renamed it Robinson Galleries. There, she showed work by Edward Hopper, Arthur Dove, Jacob Lawrence and Norman Bluhm, among many others. She was instrumental in launching the art careers of Mel Chin and Jesse Lott.

In 1974, she met James "Jim" Harithas, the newly arrived director of the CAMH. From her gallery, she witnessed a fistfight on the museum's loading dock between Harithas and Chicano muralist Leo Tanguma. It made a lasting impression.

In 1977, she collaborated with the CAMH on an exhibition, arranged by Harithas, of her Kachina doll collection. She made generous donations to the museum and underwrote a program of visiting artists at the University of Houston. She funded the Lawndale Art Center and supported Project Row Houses.

In September 1978, she and Jim married. The pair would be the Houston art scene's power couple for decades to come, devoting themselves to local and regional artists as well as those working with politically- and socially-engaged content.

== Collages ==
Harithas started showing her collages in 1978, the first as part of a group show at Delta Gallery in Houston. She would go on to exhibit in more than 50 shows in the U.S. and internationally. Ten of these were solo exhibitions at such locations as The Museum of Contemporary Art in Washington D.C., Betty Moody Gallery in Houston and The Nave Museum in Victoria, Texas.

In addition to South Texas painter Madeline O'Connor, she counted Hannah Hoch, Lee Miller, Alfonso Ossorio, Jesse Lott, Susan Plum, Mel Chin and Travis Whitfield among her influences.

She worked instinctively, letting the story unfold as she assembled collage elements. Hopi kachinas, santos and other religious icons are prevalent in her work. In The Art of Found Objects: Interviews with Texas Artists, she told author Robert Craig Bunch, "Both Kachinas and the other religious components of my collages speak to essential and intimate spirituality, and each person who views the work has their own way of relating to this. I use Indian and Christian religious images, taking them out of their traditional familiar context so their 'spirit' can be more clearly communicated."

As new technologies became available, she would digitally or photographically enlarge small works to enormous proportions. She was intrigued by the way the collages changed at different scales, even shifting the focal point and meaning.

== The Art Car Museum ==
Robinson Galleries closed in 1980.

Two years earlier, the Harithases met Larry Fuente, one of the Bay Area's premier "glue artists," a counterculture junk art movement in which small found objects were used to decorate larger ones. In Ancient Roots/New Visions, a show at The University of Houston's Blaffer Gallery, Fuente was represented by a toilet decorated with hundreds of beads, paste gems and a large statuette of the Virgin Mary. Ann was enthralled and bought it, but what she really wanted was one of Fuente's art cars. She commissioned one that took him and a team of assistants five years to complete.

The Mad Cad was one of eight monumental works brought in for Collision, a show Ann curated at Lawndale Art Center in 1984. The 1960 Cadillac Sedan de Ville was encrusted with millions of beads and faux jewels; swan, duck and flamingo figurines; action figures; shoe soles and plastic horses, which resulted in a surprisingly elegant, if over the top, construction.

Soon after, Ann fashioned Swamp Mutha from a 1982 Monte Carlo in collaboration with Jesse Lott. Her passion for art cars, shared by her husband, would ultimately manifest in an Art Car Museum and annual Art Car Parade.

The Art Car Museum, aka Garage Mahal, opened in 1998. The private, not-for-profit center is dedicated to contemporary art. The museum's mission is to serve as "an exhibition forum for local, national and international artists with an emphasis on art cars, other fine arts and artists that are rarely, if ever, acknowledged by other cultural institutions."

As with all of the Harithases' venues, the Art Car Museum also presents overtly political work.

== Station Museum of Contemporary Art ==
The couple established the Station Museum of Contemporary Art in 2001 with the goal of providing "a resource that deepens and broadens public awareness of the cultural, political, economic, and personal dimensions of art."

Post-CAMH and without a governing board, Jim Harithas was free to follow his curatorial passions: the work of local artists or groups of outside artists, often that of underrepresented or undiscovered voices of protest. During its 20 years of operation, the Station Museum mounted shows that dealt with the concerns of Palestinians, Iraqis, the LGBTQ community, people of color, Indigenous Americans and others who question "society’s morality and ethics.”

== The Nave Museum ==
In the 2000s and 2010s, Ann served on The Nave Museum's board of directors and curated several shows. She also exhibited her own work in two solo shows.

In 2007, The Nave organized a solo show for Harithas entitled The Collages. A second, Transformative Visions, ran in 2013.

As curator, Harithas mounted numerous exhibitions, including the following.

- Jesse Lott's Standing at the Crossroads was a retrospective solo show of his "urban frontier" art.
- Tres Latinos brought together three Hispanic artists under the age of 30: painter/graffitist Carlos Donjuan, printmaker Juan de Dios Mora and photographer Santiago Forero.
- Carter Ernst: Fur Bitten showcased the sculptor's surreal, colorful fabric, faux fur and ceramic take on the natural world.
- Susan Plum's A World in Glass presented glass works, prints and pastels united by the theme of light.
- For Mel Chin's Funk and Wag A to Z, the artist took over the entirety of the museum. The exterior, fitted out as a Temple of the Gods, was adorned with basketballs bunched like grapes and leaves made of basketball nets, referencing the relationship between popular culture and sports with a nod to The Nave's Greek architecture. The interior was filled with 524 collages assembled from photographs extracted from all 25 volumes of the 1953-56 edition of Funk & Wagnalls Universal Standard Encyclopedia.

== Five Points Museum of Contemporary Art ==
April 16, 2016 saw the opening of the Five Points Museum of Contemporary Art, a "gift" from Harithas to the city of Victoria. She established the free-to-the-public institution following her tenure at The Nave as a place where she could make her own rules.

The opening show, Noah Edmundson's Lost Worlds: New Drawings and Sculpture coincided with an art car parade through downtown Victoria. Some of the cars and lowriders, which Harithas described as South Texas "indigenous culture," were then put on display at the museum.

Exhibitions at the Five Points largely involve art cars, but the museum has hosted work by some of Harithas' favorite activist artists. Shows she curated include:

- Irvin Tepper's 2018 exhibition, Evidence of Phantoms Made Real Between Thoughts was a "mystical visual exploration" manifested through drawings, sculpture and video.
- Lowrider Excellence: The Leal Brothers featured ten award-winning cars created by the Corpus Christi artists.
- Salvaged Species, an exhibit of Mark “Scrapdaddy” Bradford's work, was shown in conjunction with the 2019 art car parade. The artist's cars/hydraulic walking machines, kinetic creatures and other sculptures are constructed from scrap metal.
- For The Road So Far, Harithas brought together Jesse Lott and Travis Whitfield in a 2019 show reflective of the artists' deep roots in the South, urban Texas in Lott's case and rural Louisiana in Whitfield's.
- Harithas organized Insurgent: The Paintings of Clark V. Fox in 2021. Using appropriated corporate and political icons, the artist's work attempts to dismantle the effect of capitalist culture on our consciousness.

Community outreach and arts education are part the institution's mission. Live theater and film screenings are also offered.

== Later years and death ==
In 2012, Harithas experienced brain trauma that left her with significant memory loss. By assembling collages from family photos and images of her injured brain, her faculties improved and she made a full recovery. The series of collages were presented in the exhibit Ann Harithas: Memory at D.M. Allison Gallery in Houston.

Ann's last curatorial endeavor was the mounting of the major museum show Mel Chin: Points of View held in conjunction with his large-scale public installation Wake in downtown Victoria (2021-2022).

She died in Houston on December 23, 2021, at age 80.
