= Art car =

Vehicle decorated with art

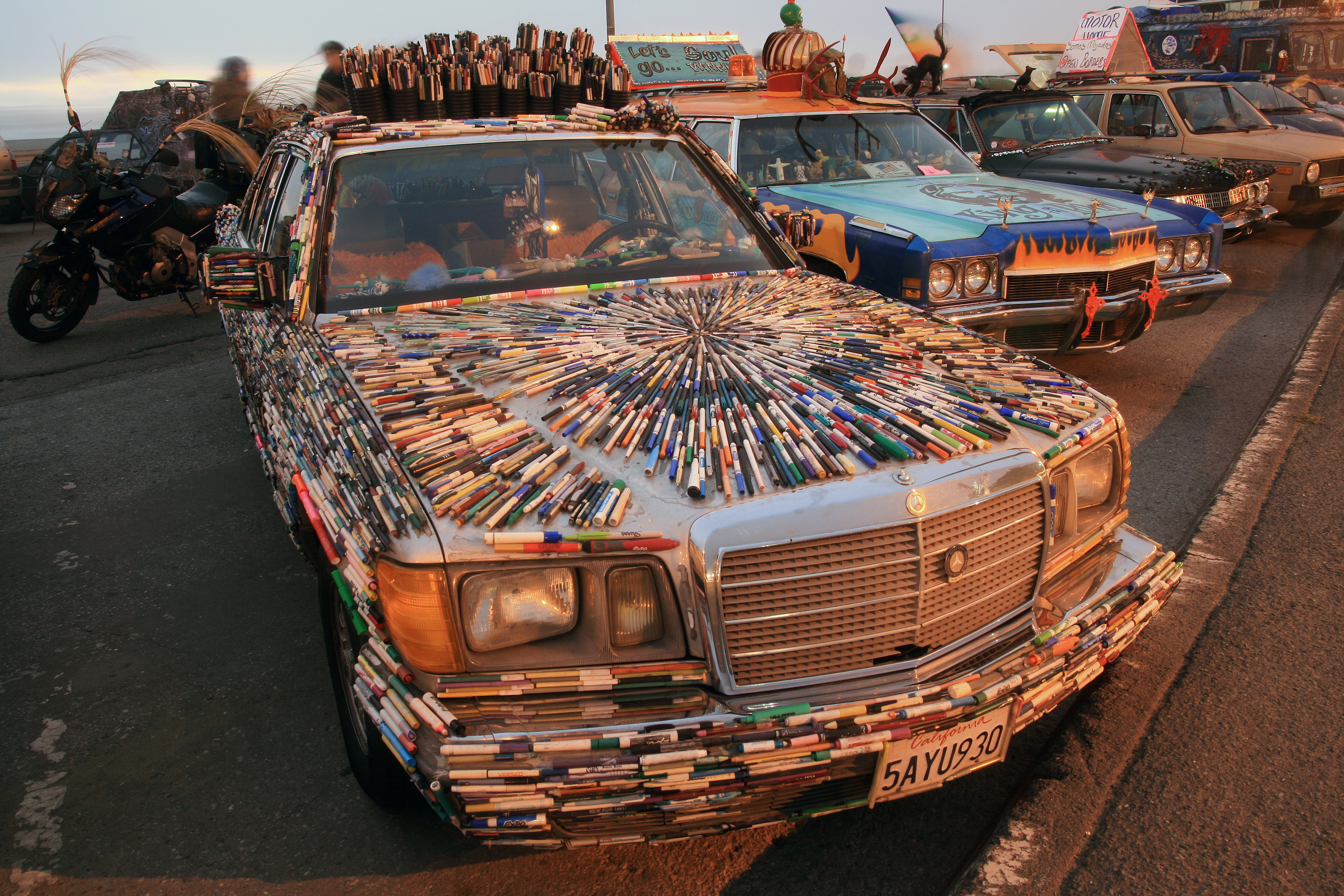
Art car festival in San Francisco

An art car is a vehicle that has had its appearance modified as an act of personal artistic expression. Art cars are often driven and owned by their creators, who are sometimes referred to as "Cartists".

Most car artists are ordinary people with no artistic training. Artists are largely self-taught and self funded, though some mainstream trained artists have also worked in the art car medium. Most car artists agree that creating and driving an art car daily is its own reward. Artists like Roy Lichtenstein, Andy Warhol and others have designed BMW Art Cars and their work has been reflected in racing cars like the BMW V12 LMR.

== History ==
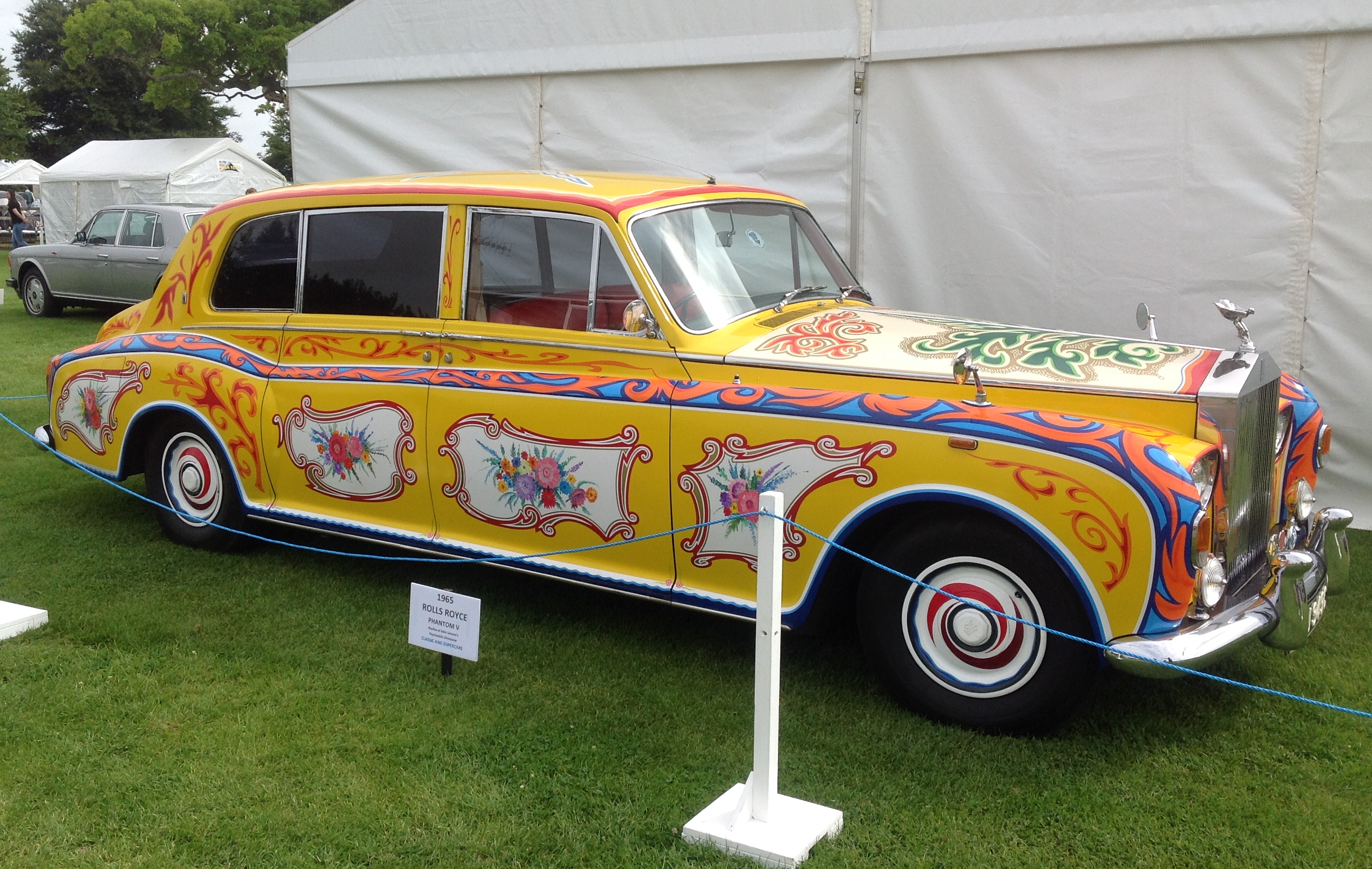
Replica of John Lennon's Rolls Royce Phantom with a psychedelic paintjob inspired by Romani wagons

The art car subculture started with several influences including the lowrider, the hippie-themed VWs of the late 1960s, and the Merry Pranksters' decorated school bus creation known as Furthur.

During the late 1960s, singer Janis Joplin had a psychedelically-painted Porsche 356 and John Lennon had a psychedelic Rolls-Royce. Partly in imitation, the late 1960s/early 1970s counterculture featured many painted VW Buses (sometimes with a peace symbol in place of the giant VW logo) and customized vehicles (e.g. a customized 1977 Cadillac Fleetwood seen in the film Escape from New York). Likewise, as a way of evading The Muppet Movie's main antagonist "Doc Hopper", Dr. Teeth and the Electric Mayhem paint up the borrowed 1951 "bullet-nose" Studebaker Commander two-door owned by Fozzie Bear's uncle in a psychedelic manner, for Fozzie and Kermit the Frog to escape safely, at least for a while.

Artist Larry Fuente was among the first to take motorized appliqué to the limit with his "Mad Cad." Later, artists David Best and Jackie Harris contributed their works to the art car world.

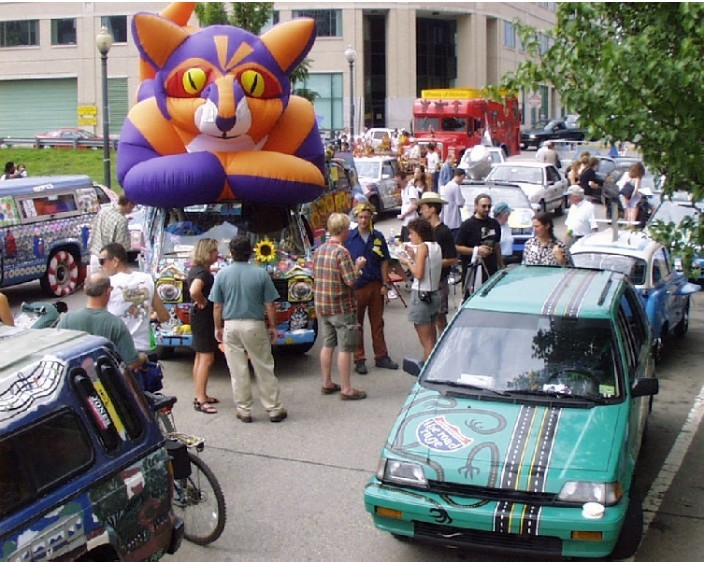
An example of an art car event - cars gathered in Providence, RI at the Rhode Rally 2000

An art car community began to cohere in the 1990s, inspired by movies and books with a wide underground following, and the development of innovative art display venues such as Burning Man. One of the main forces behind this is filmmaker and art car artist Harrod Blank, who created the art car documentaries Wild Wheels (1992), Driving The Dream (1998) and Automorphosis (2009). He also published two books Wild Wheels (1993, 2001) and Art Cars: the cars, the artists, the obsession, the craft (2002, 2007, 2012). Blank also co-founded ArtCar Fest with Philo Northrup in the San Francisco Bay Area. It was the United States' second largest art car festival.

Gloworama, a 2010 New Year's Eve event in Houston, Texas, had over 100 illuminated entrants. It was produced by ArtX. The illuminated parade also drew the attention of the Galveston, Texas-based business Yaga's Entertainment, Inc. (the contract holder of Mardi Gras! Galveston 2011–2015) as part of their five-year contract signed on 18 November 2010.A well known early art car used for commercial advertisement was the Oscar Mayer Wienie Wagon—Later versions were known as the Wienermobile. These are bus-sized vehicles styled to appear as a hot dog on a bun. Commercial use of the art car has become popular in the 20th and continues into the 21st century. At the same time visionary applications including cars transformed into religious shrines continues to place visionary self-taught artists, student artists and corporate artists side by side on the road and at art car events.

The art car culture was once strongest throughout Texas and the Southeast but now it extends throughout the United States and art car events can be found in many major cities as well as in small country towns. Art cars now very evident in the East, with a large event often held in Baltimore. In Canada, art cars are popular in British Columbia and also in the western Canadian plains with shows in Nanaimo, British Columbia and Regina, Saskatchewan. Other cars can be found throughout the world, most recently in Europe with the European arm of car-hire firm Avis supporting the movement.

== Artistic styles ==
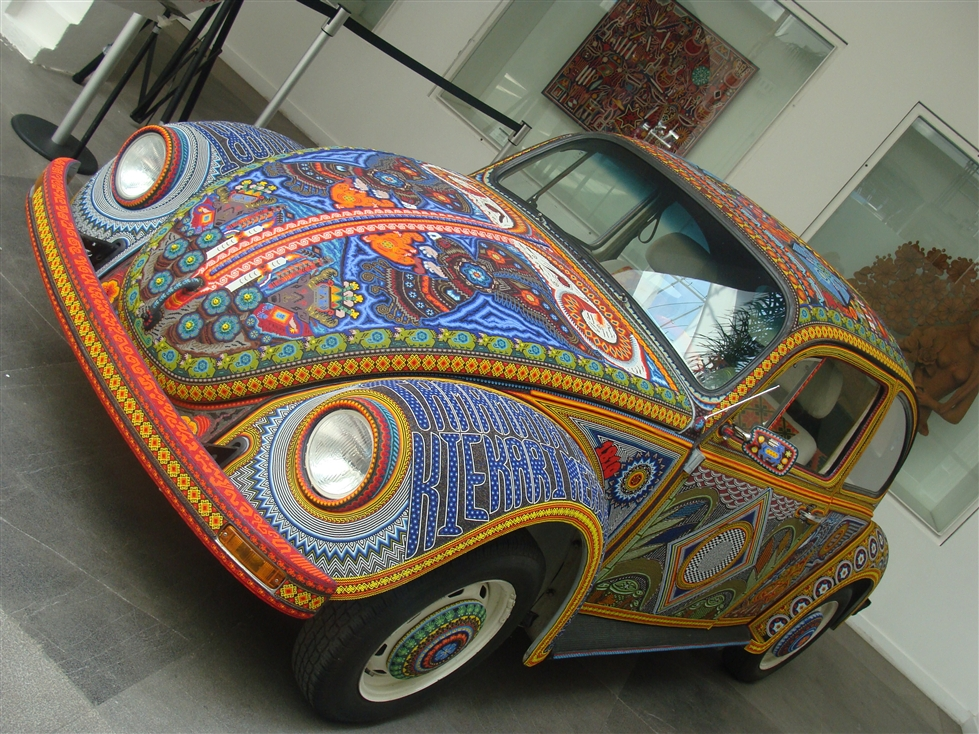
The "Vochol" decorated with over 2.5 million beads in Huichol style

Art cars are public and mobile expressions of the artistic need to create. Often these days art cars derive their inspiration from popular culture. Others however, are created by visionary artists in order to express complex visions, philosophies and ideas. There is a wide and varied spectrum of purpose found in art cars. In creating an art car, the "exteriors and interiors of factory-made automobiles are transformed into expressions of individual ideas, values, beliefs and dreams. The cars range from imaginatively painted vehicles to extravagant fantasies whose original bodies are concealed beneath newly sculptured shells".

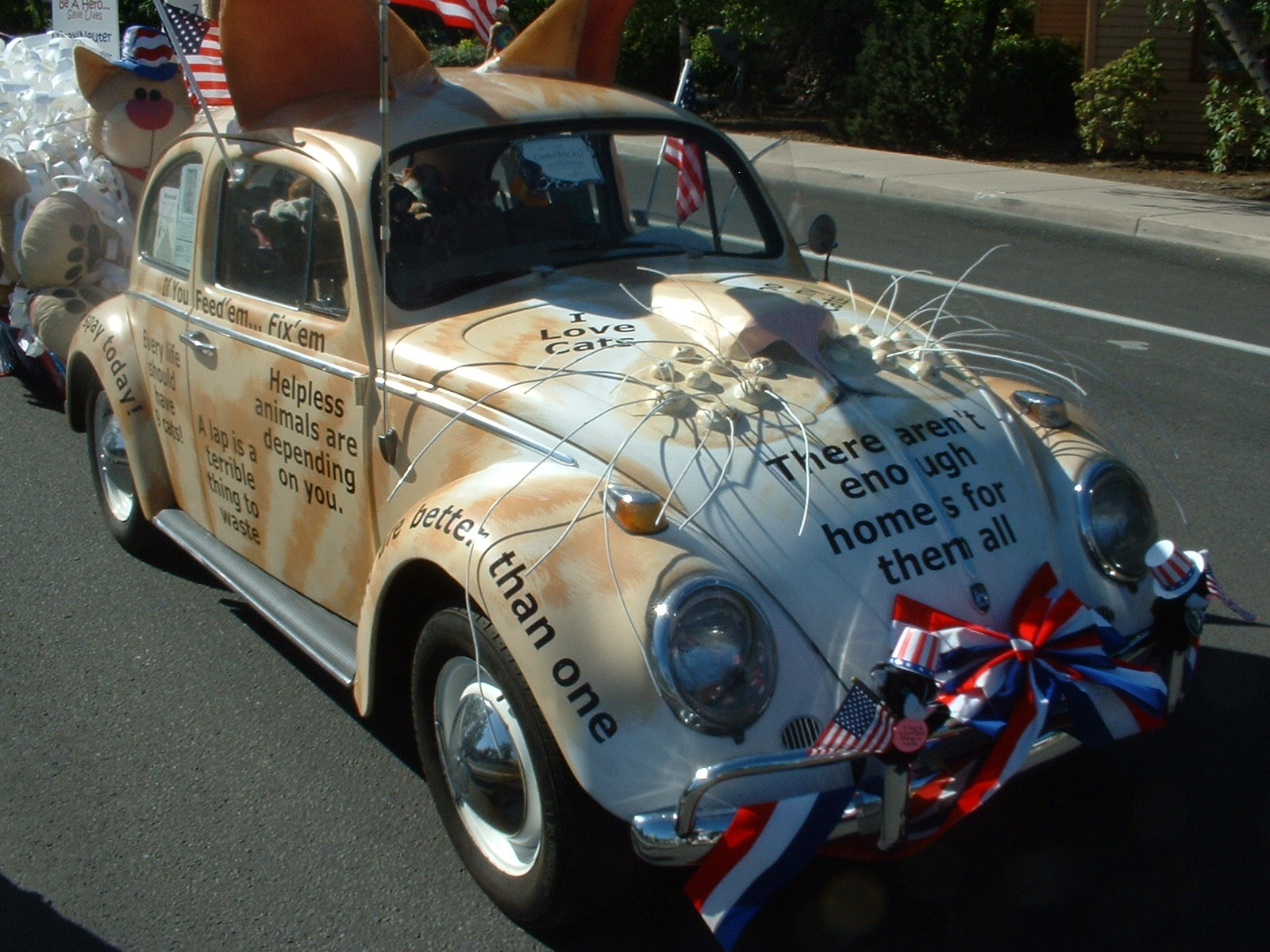
An example of an art car with a message meant to educate

Later themes have become more widely focused and more satirical or dark. Science fiction themes (monsters, giant insects from Them!, flying saucers), surrealism, and expressions of the Gothic and the sublime, are not uncommon. In parades and shows, "arted" bicycles or motor-scooters or costumed roller-skaters may also weave among the art cars. Some art car owners incorporate elements of music or street theater in their presentation.

For cars to be roadworthy, artistic style must be kept with the constraints of the law. This generally means keeping turn signals and windows clear, license plates visible, and not extending beyond the width of a normal car frame.

== See also ==
- Art bike
- ArtCar Museum
- Cartist Automobile Art Festival
- BMW Art Car
- Dekotora
- Houston Art Car Parade
- Itasha
- Lowrider
- Truck art in South Asia
- Vochol
