= James Harithas =

American museum director (1932–2023)

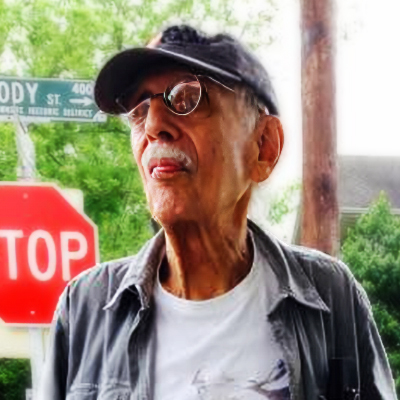
- Harithas in 2016
- Born: James Harithas; December 1, 1932; Lewiston, Maine, U.S.
- Died: March 23, 2023 (aged 90); Houston, Texas, U.S.
- Education: University of Maine, University of Pennsylvania
- Occupations: Museum Director, Founder
- Known for: Director of the Everson Museum, the Contemporary Arts Museum-Houston and the Station Museum of Contemporary Art
- Spouses: Christiana Bakas (m. 1958; div. 1977) Ann O'Connor Williams (m. 1978; died 2021)

James Harithas (December 1, 1932 – March 23, 2023) was an American museum curator, director, and founder.

== Early life and education ==
Menelaus James "Jim" Harithas was born in Lewiston, Maine, the eldest of three children. His father Nikolaus was a lawyer and county judge, who had immigrated from Greece to attend Yale University. His mother, Terpsichore Seferlis, was the grandniece of a Greek Prime Minister. She painted in oils and played piano and violin.

Nikolaus served in the U.S. Army. The family moved frequently. After World War II, they were stationed in Occupied Germany, a chaotic and lawless environment. James returned to the U.S. in 1953.

He enrolled at the University of Maine at Orono, but left after three semesters. On a trip to visit his parents in 1948, Harithas was astonished by a show of Abstract Expressionist painters in Frankfurt. A few years later, he saw works by Jackson Pollock to "overwhelming effect." The experiences changed his life. He quit school and hitchhiked to New York City to become a painter in the manner of Pollock, Kline or de Kooning.

Because his mother painted, Harithas' interest in art had been piqued when he was quite young. He drew and doodled in school, winning prizes for his work. He started painting at 18 years of age. While he pursued an art career, he worked as a dishwasher in a 72nd St. establishment and as a baggage handler at the Hotel New Yorker.

In 1954, he was drafted into the Army and was stationed in France during the Algerian War. After his discharge from the service in 1956, he stayed on in France. In 1957, he was admitted to the École des Beaux-Arts in Nancy, but it was not long before he returned to the United States

He finished his undergraduate degree at the University of Maine. His field of study included political science, history, philosophy and art. He obtained an MFA from the University of Pennsylvania. After graduation, he held a job cleaning sugar machines at the Quaker Sugar Refinery in Philadelphia while simultaneously making art.

In 1958, he married Christiana Bakas, with whom he had three daughters, Ifienia, Thalia, and Amalia.

== Early career ==
Harithas landed a curatorial position with the De Cordova Museum in 1962. Although it was largely a regional museum, he was able to show work by Andy Warhol and Hans Haacke.

The following year, Harithas was appointed Curator of Collection of the Phoenix Art Museum. His notable achievements there included a Paolo Soleri exhibition that was later shown at the Corcoran Gallery and the Whitney Museum, as well as a Contemporary Mexican exhibition that received national attention.

== Corcoran Gallery of Art ==
After two years in Phoenix, Harithas was hired as a curator by the Corcoran in Washington, D.C. He advanced to the position of assistant director. In 1968, he became director.

At the time, Washington, D.C., was the epicenter of the civil rights and anti-war movements. Harithas attended anti-war demonstrations and the March on the Pentagon. His commitment to protest art solidified during the turbulent years. Believing the museum should respond to the social upheaval caused by race riots in the city, he opened a food distribution center in one of the galleries and increased the number of shows by African American artists held there.

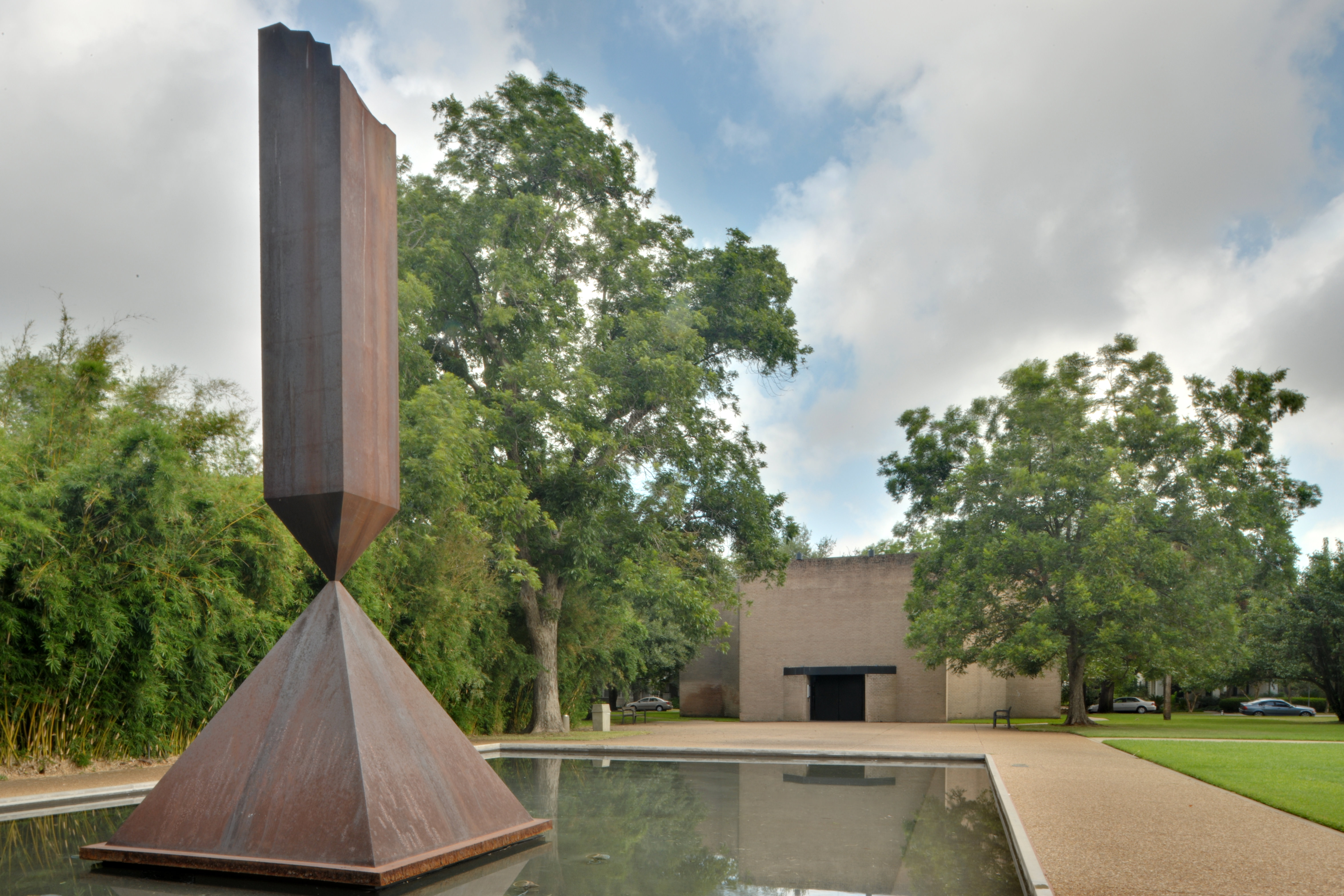
Barnett Newman Broken Obelisk Rothko Chapel (HDR)

In 1967, Scale as Content brought three monumental sculptures to locations outside the Corcoran. Barnett Newman's piece, 3-tons of Cor-Ten steel shaped like an inverted obelisk balanced on the point of a pyramid, was placed on a corner between the museum and the National Mall with a view of the Washington Monument. Broken Obelisk stirred up considerable controversy since it appeared to allude to broken, upside-down government policies during a time of civil unrest.

In 1969, Harithas initiated a new approach to the Corcoran Biennial. The 31st Biennial changed the tone, direction, and process that would govern subsequent biennials. He ended the former juried selection process, taking full responsibility for inviting all participants. He also reconfigured the exhibition format, creating twenty-three separate solo exhibitions stationed throughout the museum. The show continued to focus on abstract color painting, but Harithas concentrated on younger artists who had rarely been seen in a museum context and artists who had made significant contributions to American painting but had received little recognition.

After nine months as director, Harithas wore out his welcome at the Corcoran and went back to New York, where he taught at Hunter College and the School of Visual Arts." When Harithas left, Barnett Newman removed Broken Obelisk in a show of solidarity. The sculpture would eventually end up at the Rothko Chapel in Houston.

== Everson Museum of Art ==
From 1971 to 1974 Harithas served as the Everson Museum of Art's director in Syracuse, New York. He later said some of best work was done there: one-person shows of Nam June Paik, Joan Mitchell, Norman Bluhm, Marilyn Minter, and Hermann Nitsch, and activist programs featuring Daniel Berrigan and Leonard Crow Dog.

In 1972, he gave Yoko Ono her first museum show This is Not Here. At the time, very few women were getting shows. Harithas also thought the Fluxus movement she represented was important. The exhibition involved the entirety of the museum. Yoko invited fifty other artists, including John Lennon, to participate.

Also notable was the 1973 solo exhibition of Elaine Sturtevant, Sturtevant: Studies done for Beuys’ Action and objects, Duchamps’ etc. Including film. Of Sturtevant, Harithas is attributed to have said, “She's as much a mystic and as mysterious a character as you'd want to find in the art world.”

Upon arrival in Syracuse, Harithas hired David Ross, a recent university graduate, as the Everson's Curator of Video Art. The job was the first such position anywhere in the country. Harithas and Ross turned the Everson into a hub of video art. Nam June Paik and Charlotte Moorman performed an early version of Paik's iconic Video Cello in 1972.(Ross went on to helm the Boston Institute of Contemporary Art, the Whitney Museum, and the San Francisco Museum of Modern Art.) In 1973, the Everson hosted a month-long, solo exhibition featuring the work of video artist Frank Gillette. Part of Harithas’ endeavor to make the museum a pioneer institution for the medium, the show was the first to devote all four upper galleries to a video artist.

Harithas also spent considerable time working with Central New York's prison population. During the Attica riots, he taught classes at Auburn Correctional Facility, mentoring artists such as Juan Alberto Cruz. Harithas believed a prison fine arts program could offer a "creative framework within which the student can explore his visual and intellectual relationship to the ‘inside’ as well as the ‘outside’ and dispel or deal with irrational or unaccountable fantasies." A 1973 Smithsonian exhibition titled From Within grew out of the program.

Harithas left the Everson in 1974 for the Contemporary Arts Museum Houston. While he was reasonably happy in Syracuse, relocation would provide a gateway to Mexico and South America which he was keen to explore. He also had family ties to the region.

== Contemporary Arts Museum Houston (CAMH) ==
Colleagues told Harithas a move to Houston was too far from the mainstream art world and would ruin his career. But he saw it as a challenge that also fulfilled a need to escape New York City's sphere of influence and to think of art “as a fundamental activity rather than a geopolitical hustle.”

During his tenure at the CAMH (1974–1978), the museum functioned almost as an alternative space, in part because it could little afford to do much else. Harithas focused intently on supporting and showcasing Texas artists. The exhibitions were inexpensive to mount and offered rich soil for the growth of local talent.

The first show he organized was Art of the Lower Crust, an exhibition of work by museum staff members. A follow-up exhibit 12/Texas brought national recognition to several of the dozen participants. Texas artists receiving solo shows, frequently their first in the context of a museum, included: Dick Wray, James Surls, Dorothy Hood, Luis Jimenez, Terry Allen, John Alexander, and Mel Casas. The show Dále Gas, organized by artist and CAMH curator Santos Martinez Jr. at Harithas' request, was the first major museum exhibition of Chicano art in Texas.

In February 1976, Harithas presented transplanted Texan Julian Schnabel's first solo show in the CAMH's Lower Gallery. In June of that year, a flash flood filled the lower level with nine feet of water, damaging gallery and office spaces, and destroying artwork on display and in storage. Harithas and artist John Alexander donned scuba gear in an attempt to salvage artwork, but dozens of paintings, sculptures, and artifacts were irreparably damaged.

The museum closed for months while building repairs were made. Houstonians responded with generous donations and a fund-raising drive that enabled the space to reopen in March 1977.

Flush with post-flood cash, Harithas mounted a series of ambitious projects. A retrospective of sculptor Sal Scarpitta's work filled the upper gallery with large, wrapped, resin-soaked canvases and "sleds," detailed reproductions of race cars and the recreation of a 1940s Italian tank. Light sculptor Dale Eldred installed his Solar Sculpture in the upper gallery and on the museum's corrugated metal exterior. (The museum closed for a month while 4,000 120-ft. long steel filaments painted in fluorescent colors were hung from the gallery's ceiling and an 8,000 ft. by 20 ft. mylar banner was attached to the facade.) In October 1977, Harithas brought in multidisciplinary artist Antoni Miralda, whose installations, performances, and happenings focused on food: the culture, politics, and ritual of what we eat.

Miralda's CAMH installation Breadline included photographs of food, as well as videos of the preparation and consumption of food at local restaurants. (Similarly to his tenure at the Everson, Harithas had hired a CAMH videographer.) The Kilgore Rangerettes drill team were brought in for opening night to perform their high-kicks routine and carry trays of rainbow-hued bread loaves from the CAMH's lower level to a 175-ft. long row of benches in the main gallery. As soon as a troublemaker threw a loaf, the event descended into a massive food and fist fight that spilled into the street.

The Breadline debacle combined with dwindling funds and lack of faith in Harithas' leadership led the board to hire a business manager with tacit power over the director at a salary equal to his. (The fact Harithas had proposed to include the writings of Charles Manson in an upcoming show did not help.) The board even contemplated whether the CAMH should exist at all and considered merging with the Museum of Fine Arts, Houston. Incensed at the idea of a co-director, Harithas tendered his resignation in May 1978.

== Ann Harithas ==
Shortly after his arrival in Houston, Harithas met his second wife, Ann O'Connor Williams Robinson. Born into a prominent Texas oil and ranching family, Ann had been interested in art since childhood. With her first husband, she established Galerie Ann in Houston in 1970. When they divorced in 1977, she took over the space, renaming it Robinson Galleries. Her first collaboration with the CAMH was a post-flood exhibition, arranged by Harithas, of her Kachina doll collection. She also made generous donations to the museum.

In September 1978, she and Jim married. The pair would be the Houston art scene's power couple for decades to come, devoting themselves to local and regional artists as well as those working with politically- and socially-engaged content.

== Art Car Museum ==
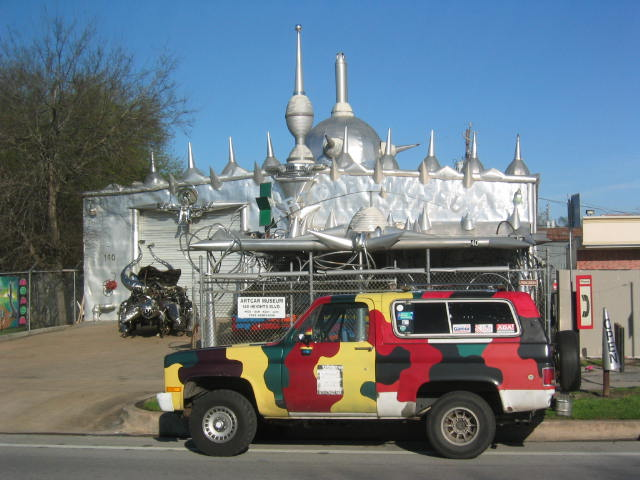
ArtCarMuseum

With Ann, Harithas founded the Art Car Museum, aka Garage Mahal, in 1998. The private, not-for-profit arts center is dedicated to contemporary art. The museum's mission is to serve as "an exhibition forum for local, national and international artists with an emphasis on art cars, other fine arts and artists that are rarely, if ever, acknowledged by other cultural institutions."

The couple were early supporters of the Art Car Movement. Curated by Ann Harithas, the Collision show at Lawndale Art Center (1984), showcased Larry Fuente's Mad Cad, a beaded, sequined 1960 Cadillac Sedan de Ville commissioned by Ann. She later constructed the art car Swamp Mutha, from a 1982 Monte Carlo, with Jesse Lott. This interest would ultimately manifest in the Art Car Museum and an annual Art Car Parade.

As with all of Jim and Ann Harithas' venues, the Art Car Museum fearlessly presented overtly political work. The week after 9/11, the museum opened an exhibition against the George W. Bush administration's international policies. When the FBI and Secret Service tried to interfere with the show, the community objected. A lead editorial in the Houston Chronicle suggested the FBI stay out of the art world and look for terrorists elsewhere.

== Station Museum of Contemporary Art ==
Ann and Jim established the Station Museum of Contemporary Art in 2001 with the goal of providing "a resource that deepens and broadens public awareness of the cultural, political, economic, and personal dimensions of art."

Without a governing board, Harithas was free to follow his curatorial passions: the work of local artists or groups of outsider artists, often that of underrepresented or undiscovered voices of protest. During its 20 years of operation, the Station Museum mounted shows that dealt with the concerns of Palestinians, Iraqis, the LGBTQ community, people of color, Indigenous Americans and others who question "society's morality and ethics.”

Most Station Museum shows took a strong political stand, which Harithas sought to merge with imagery that went beyond mere illustration. In the best of these, Harithas said, the work becomes "a window to a world where politics and the aesthetic dimension [are] unified."

The results could be controversial. In June 2017, a group of protestors gathered outside the museum to protest an exhibition of Andres Serrano staged "torture" photographs. In particular, they objected to the display of the infamous 1987 photograph Immersion (Piss Christ), which was also in the show. The museum was aware of the protest before it started, and posted to its Facebook page prior to the demonstration's start: "We support the freedom to gather and to speak truth to power, and would like to invite our community to come out and show their support for the Station Museum to uphold freedom of speech and freedom of expression."

== Five Points Museum of Contemporary Art ==
In 2016, the couple opened a third private museum. The Five Points Museum in Victoria, Texas, also focuses on contemporary art and hosts its own Art Car Parade. Community outreach and arts education are part of the institution's mission.

Exhibitions at the Five Points largely involve art cars, but the museum has hosted work by some of Harithas' favorite activist artists, including Mel Chin and Clark V. Fox. Live theater and film screenings are also offered.

== Later years ==
Harithas remained fully engaged with the Station Museum until his death. He gave a 2022 interview and produced a catalog for Clark V. Fox: Subversion and Spectacle, the last show in the space. In November 2022, the museum staff announced the facility would be on hiatus from public exhibitions and programming until further notice (effectively closing the museum).

Late in life, he told a reporter, "I like to show things that are way out on the edge and see what the result is...If you follow the history of art, you see that contributions are made very often at the edges by somebody who has kind of broken through with a different idea... Modern Art has moved away from the idea that you have to draw a certain way or illustrate a certain way in order to be an artist. An artist is just somebody that expounds something passionately as far as I'm concerned. You know, visually through his art, using whatever materials he wants."

Harithas died in Houston on March 23, 2023, at the age of 90.
