= Richard Ray (disambiguation) =

Richard Ray (1927–1999) was the United States representative for Georgia's 3rd district from 1983 to 1993.

Richard, Rick, Ricky, Richie, or Dick Ray may also refer to:

Given name and surname

- Rick Ray, American filmmaker best known for his 2006 documentary film 10 Questions for the Dalai Lama
- Rick Ray (basketball) (born 1970), American basketball coach
- Ricky Ray (born 1979), American former professional Canadian football quarterback
- Ricky Ray (1977–1992), one of the three Ray brothers, hemophiliacs were diagnosed with HIV in 1986 due to blood transfusions
- Richie Ray (born 1945), Nuyorican pianist, singer, music arranger, composer and religious minister
- Dick Ray (1876–1952), English association football player and manager

Given names

- Richard Ray Farrell (born 1956), American electric blues guitarist, harmonicist, singer and songwriter
- Richard Ray Larsen (born 1965), United States representative for Washington's 2nd congressional district since 2000
- Richard Ray Perez, American documentary film producer and director, including of Unprecedented: The 2000 Presidential Election
- Richard Ray Whitman (born 1949), Yuchi-Muscogee multidisciplinary visual artist, poet, and actor
- Ricky Ray Rector (1950–1992), executed in Arkansas for a 1981 murder

== Similar names ==
- Dick Wray (1933–2011), American abstract expressionist painter
