= Scarpitta =

Scarpitta is a surname. Notable people with the surname include:

- Carmen Scarpitta (1933–2008), Italian actress
- Salvatore Scarpitta (1919–2007), American artist

Variations of the name “”Scarpitta”” include “”Scarpitto””. Notable people with the variation include:

- L.M. Scarpitto (1991-), American author
