= Station Museum of Contemporary Art =

- The Station Museum of Contemporary Art in Houston
- Established: 2001; 25 years ago
- Dissolved: 2022
- Location: 1502 Alabama Street, Houston, Texas, United States
- Coordinates: 29.734915°N 95.375651°W
- Type: Contemporary art museum
- Director: James Harithas
- Curator: Alan Schnitger
- Public transit access: Bus station on La Branch Street, METRO
- Website: www.stationmuseum.com

The Station Museum of Contemporary Art was a private museum owned and run by James and Ann Harithas devoted to contemporary art located at 1502 Alabama Street in the Third Ward of Houston, Texas, United States. Started in 2001, the museum's goal has been as a resource that deepened and broadened public awareness of the cultural, political, economic, and personal dimensions of art." In November 2022, the Station Museum of Contemporary Art announced a hiatus from public exhibitions and programming and never reopened. The former space is now occupied by Inman Gallery owned by Kerry Inman.

The museum has been an activist institution supporting civil society issues as well as artists who have engaged in social, political, aesthetic, economic, and/or spiritual content and expressions.

In addition to traditional exhibitions, the museum has featured monthly film-screenings, musical events, lectures, fundraisers and more which aimed to inspire a dialogue that encouraged the public awareness of the lives of others. Past exhibitions include the art of many Texas artists, including Mel Chin, James Drake, Dick Wray, Jesse Lott, George Smith, as well as group exhibits. In addition to Texas art, the museum has shown art from Mexico, Peru, Venezuela, Colombia, Congo, South Africa, Czech Republic, Austria, Palestine, Iraq, India, Afghanistan, and Russia.
