= The Orange Show =

Folk art and tourist attraction in Houston, Texas, U.S.

- U.S. National Register of Historic Places
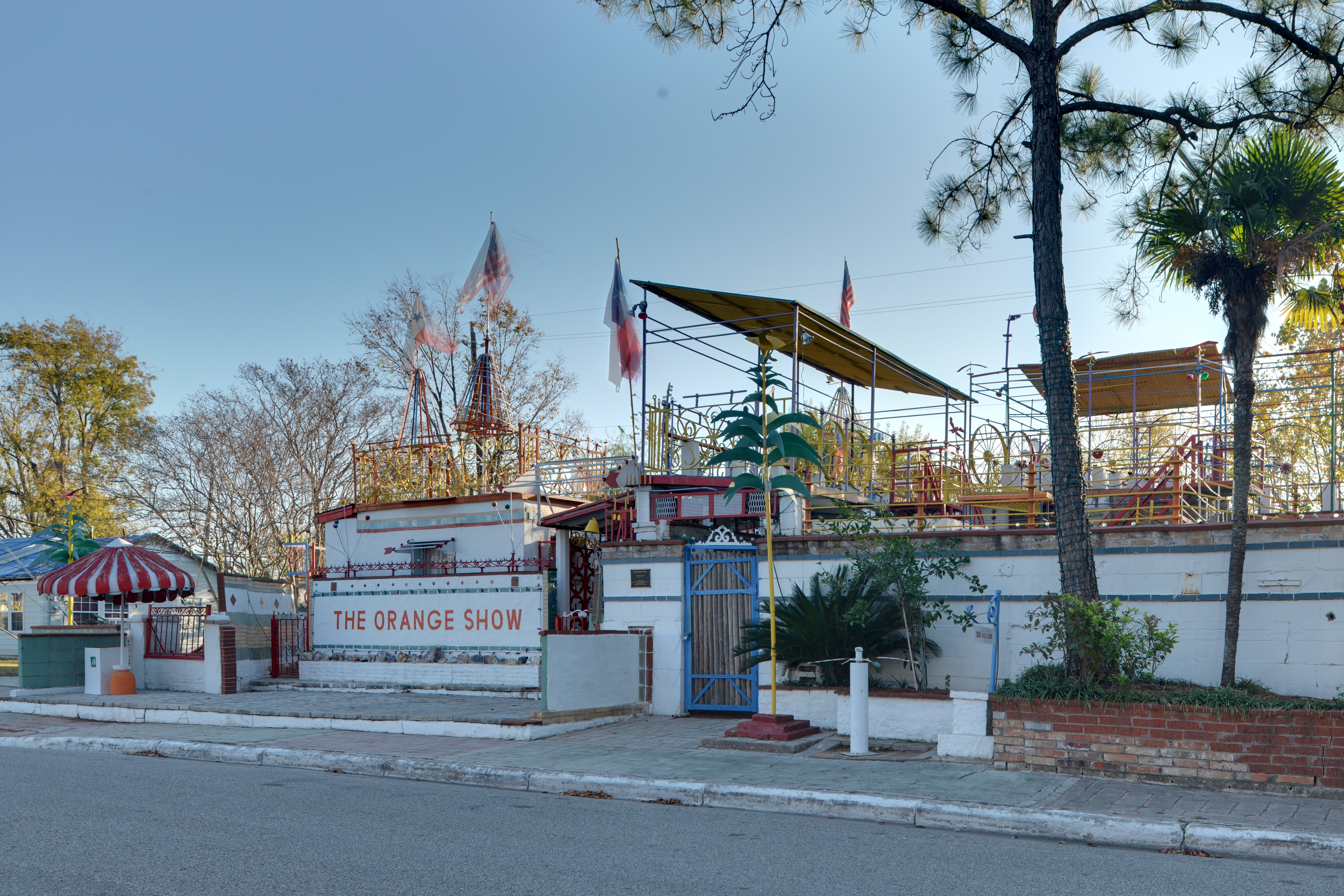
- Location: 2401 Munger St; Houston, Texas
- Coordinates: 29°43′03.69″N 95°19′27.36″W
- NRHP reference No.: 06001063
- Added to NRHP: November 21, 2006

The Orange Show is a work of outsider art in Houston, Texas. Jeff McKissack, a mail carrier, transformed a small suburban lot near his house into a folk art installation, which he named "The Orange Show" in honor of his favorite fruit. It was listed on the National Register of Historic Places in 2006.

The Orange Show has evolved into the Orange Show Center for Visionary Art and since 1980 is a non-profit organization. As a form of folk art, The Orange Show captures a segment of late 20th Century American culture. Programming at the Orange Show includes hands-on workshops, music, storytelling and performance, the Eyeopener Tour program and the Houston Art Car Parade. The foundation has grown to take in other folk art icons including the Beer Can House. In addition, it constructed a Smither Park with mosaic installations adjacent to The Orange Show.

The ArtCar Museum is scheduled to re-open in the Orange Show.

== See also ==
- List of public art in Houston
