= Salvatore Scarpitta =

American artist (1919–2007)

Salvatore Scarpitta (23 March 1919 – 10 April 2007) was an American artist best known for his sculptural studies of motion.

== Life and artistic career ==
Scarpitta was born in New York City in 1919 to a Sicilian father, sculptor Salvatore Cartaino Scarpitta, and Ukrainian mother, Josephine “Nadia” Jarocka. His family relocated to Los Angeles when he was six months of age. He graduated from Hollywood High School and then attended the premier art university in Europe, the Accademia di Belle Arti di Roma. He served in the United States Navy during World War II as a "Monuments Man", finding, preserving and cataloging art stolen by the Nazis.

After the war, Scarpitta remained in Rome and worked from his studio on Via Margutta. During his time in Rome he was represented by the leading Avant-garde modern art gallery in Italy, Galleria La Tartaruga. In 1958, Leo Castelli saw his work and asked him to move to New York and join his gallery. Scarpitta remained with Castelli until the latter's death in 1999.

From 1959 until 1992, Scarpitta had 10 one man shows at the Castelli Gallery in New York. He also was a part of many Castelli group shows that included artists such as Norman Bluhm, Andy Warhol, Robert Rauschenberg, James Rosenquist, John Chamberlain and Julian Schnabel. Scarpitta's works are part of the permanent collections at the Museum of Modern Art and MoMA PS1 in New York, Whitney Museum of American Art, the Albright-Knox Art Gallery, Los Angeles County Museum of Art, the Hirshhorn Museum and Sculpture Garden in Washington, DC, the Kunstsammlungen zu Weimar Museum in Germany, Civico Museo d'Arte Contemporanea in Milan, the Guttuso Museum in Italy and the Contemporary Arts Museum Houston. Scarpitta also exhibited at numerous Venice Biennials.

In 2000 and 2001 Scarpitta was an Artist-in-Residence at the McColl Center for Art + Innovation.

His work is characterized by wrapped canvasses, found and wrapped objects made into sleds, and automobile themes.

== Motor racing ==
Scarpitta was the owner of a sprint car team based in New Chester, Pennsylvania. The car was campaigned under the number 59 and was a regular on the competitive central Pennsylvania circuit. He had many drivers of note and many victories. Greg O'Neill, Rick Schemlyun, Jr., Bobby Essick, Steve Christmas, Richard Lupo, Richard Lupo, Jr., Steve Stambaugh, Joey Allen, Kenny Adams, Jesse Wentz, Keith Kauffman, Bill Brian, Steve Siegel and Jimmy Siegel filled the number 59 seat at one time or another.

Scarpitta was well-respected as an owner and, upon his retirement as the team principal, the team was sold to the Siegels; it still carries the number 59 today. The car had victories at the Williams Grove, Lincoln and Susquehanna Speedways. He was close friends with fellow car owner Harry Fletcher. Scarpitta loved racing most, and it was his outsider perspective that made him unique to the world of racing. Because of his slant, he enjoyed the entire spectrum of the experience of sprint car racing and cared much less about statistics. From the arrangement of tread on the tires, the organic aspects of mud, the smell, sounds, right through to the human drama that surrounded it all, racing was his favorite thing. The different personalities made the experience entirely different from year to year.

== Death ==
Scarpitta died from complications of diabetes in Manhattan, aged 88. He was survived by his third wife, Dana Scarpitta, and two daughters, artist Lorenza (Lola) Scarpitta and Stella Scarpitta Cartaino. His eldest daughter, Nadia Scarpitta Pernice died in 2002.
