= Dick Wray =

American painter (1933–2011)

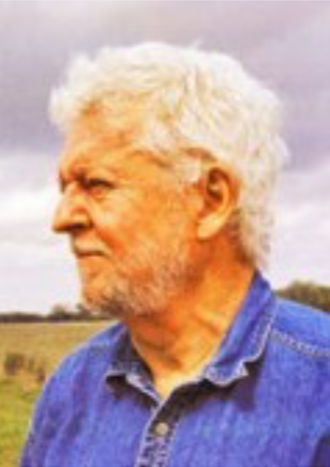
- Born: Richard B Wray; December 5, 1933; Houston, TX
- Died: January 9, 2011 (aged 77)
- Known for: Artist
- Movement: Abstract Expressionism
- Awards: Ford Foundation Purchase Prize, National Endowment for the Arts Artist Grant
- Website: www.dickwrayartist.com

Richard Wray (December 5, 1933 - January 9, 2011) was an American abstract expressionist painter whose work had an influence on the art scene in Houston, Texas. After an art career spanning over 50 years, he died at age 77 of liver disease. His work continues to be showcased by art institutions and organizations across Houston, including the Deborah Colton Gallery, and is listed on the official website for the National Gallery of Art.

== Early life and education ==
Dick Wray was born in Houston, Texas in 1933. He was the oldest child of Bundy and Mildred Wray, who both worked for the Union Pacific Railroad. His mother was known to have encouraged him to take art classes at an early age. Wray had one sibling: a brother named Robert Wray.

Wray's first gravitation toward art occurred during his early teens, when he took free art lessons at the Houston Museum of Fine Arts. After graduating from Lamar High School in 1953, he enlisted in the United States Army, where he served as a radio operator for 2 years. In 1955, Wray received an honorable discharge from the Army and enrolled in the School of Architecture of the University of Houston. There, he would spend the next 3 years studying various forms of architecture, until leaving the school to finish his studies at the Kunstakademie Düsseldorf, the Arts Academy of the city of Düsseldorf, Germany. Wray travelled to Europe in 1958 in order to discover what he believed was the "center" of the art world. The two years he spent in Europe—beginning in Paris and concluding in Germany—laid the foundation for his painting career. Though originally interested in architecture, Wray's interactions with the work of abstract expressionists, artists of a European avant-garde movement known as the CoBrA group and New York Abstract Expressionists (which Wray also saw for the first time in Europe) had tremendous influences on his artistic passions. In effect, Wray deviated away from architecture and, equipped with new knowledge of European expressionism, returned to Texas at age 26 to begin his career as a painter.

Wray launched his career in 1959 by competing in an art show at what is now the Art Museum of Southeast Texas in Beaumont. From thereon after, he exhibited his expressionist paintings in an art gallery or museum at least once per year for 51 consecutive years.

== Career and achievements ==
Wray's artistic feats are numerous. According to the William Reaves Fine Art Gallery, Wray's work has been exhibited widely throughout the country, including in Texas, New York, California, and Oklahoma. In 1962, Wray's submission to the Museum of Fine Arts Houston (MFAH) exhibition, "The Southwest: Painting and Sculpture", received the Ford Foundation Purchase Prize. While living in Los Angeles between 1964 and 1966, he was the guest artist at the Tamarind Lithography Workshop. Upon returning to Houston, he served on the faculty at the Glassell School of Art between 1968 and 1982.

Wray was one of seven artists represented in the show "Artists' Progress: Seven Houston Artists, 1943-1933" at the Glassell School of Art in 1993. In 2000, he was presented with the Houston Art League's Texas Artist of the Year Award. Wray was featured in a 2006 exhibition—"Texas Modern: The Rediscovery of Early Texas Abstraction"—at Baylor University in Waco, Texas.

In 2011, the city of Houston created laser-cut aluminum panels imitating Wray's work. The panels now scale one of the Houston Permitting Center's elevator towers, often referred to by writers as "Dick Wray's tower".

== Personal life and death ==
A few years after returning from Europe, Wray met Georgetta Harvey, a model and photographer. They were married in 1961. Though they spent most of their marriage in Houston, they maintained a brief residence in Los Angeles. Dick and Georgetta had three children: Victor, Robert and Harold. Their oldest son died at age 18 in an automobile accident. In 2011, Wray died in Houston from complications due to liver disease. He was 77.

== Critical reception ==
Public opinions of Wray's work have been mixed to generally positive. Abby Koenig of the Houston Press, in her review of the Dick Wray retrospect at the William Reaves Gallery, remarked on how "the sheer scale of Wray’s work is enough to stop you in your tracks", later claiming that "Dick Wray was a tour de force in the Texas art world and deserves all the accolades the gallery has bestowed upon him and this collection". James Harithas, director of the Station Museum of Contemporary Art, explained that "As far as the locals were concerned, Dick was one of the only painters who had been working seriously and with commitment". Bill Reaves, founder and president of the William Reaves Gallery, said that the Dick Wray retrospect was one of "the greatest one-person shows" they had on display. "His work is consistently good", Reaves said.

Others have had opposing opinions of Wray's work. According to Koenig of the Houston Press, art collector Earl Weed described Wray's paintings as "irksome, messy explosions with no apparent rhyme or reason". Regarding Wray's display at the 1977 exhibit Texas Today: Three Exhibitions at the Fort Worth Art Museum, writer and critic Michael Mewsha of the Texas Monthly remarked that "Detracting from this fundamentally solid performance is the entirely arbitrary superimposition of crude, childlike scrawls in what appears to be a halfhearted effort to incorporate a sense of raw, funky 'Texas' personality".

== Education ==
- 1958: Kunstakademie, Düsseldorf, Germany
- 1955–58: University of Houston, School of Architecture

== Grants and awards ==
- 1962: Ford Foundation Purchase Prize
- 1978: National Endowment for the Arts Artist Grant

== Exhibitions ==
His exhibitions have included:

- 2012: "Dick Wray: Explosive Color / Dynamic Paint", William Reaves Gallery, Houston, TX
- 2010: "Dick Wray: Black & White", Wade Wilson Art, Houston, TX
- 2009: "Dick Wray", Wade Wilson Art, Houston, TX "Dick Wray: Untitled", HCG Gallery, Dallas, TX
- 2008: Museum of East Texas, Lufkin, TX
- 2007: "Texas Modern: The Rediscovery of Early Texas Abstraction", Baylor University, Waco, TX, Wade Wilson Art, Houston, TX
- 2006: "Papiros Amorosos", Museo Regional de Querétaro, Oro, Mexico
- 2005: "Texas Vision: The Barrett Collection, Meadows Museum, Southern Methodist University, Dallas, TX
- 2004: "Made in Houston", Brazos Annex, Houston, TX
- 2003: "Dick Wray", The Station, Art Car Museum, Houston, TX
- 2002: "Dick Wray", Texas Christian University, Moudy Gallery, Fort Worth, TX
- 2001: "Dick Wray: 236 Paintings" ArtScan Gallery, Houston, TX
- 2000: "Dick Wray – Texas Artist of the Year: Exhibition", Art League Gallery of Houston, TX

"Dick Wray: 236 Painting", ArtScan Gallery, Houston, TX

- 1999: "International and American Contemporary Fine Art", T. Curtsnoc Fine Arts, North Miami, FL

"Dick Wray: Installation", ArtScan Gallery, Houston, TX

- 1998: "Dick Wray Prints", Lesikar Gallery, Houston, TX

"Works on Paper", State Thomas Gallery, Dallas, TX

- 1997: "Dick Wray: First New York Exhibition", Lerner Heller Gallery, NYC, NY

"Committed to Abstraction: Ten in Texas", Austin Museum of Art, TX

- 1996: "Texas Modern and Post-Modern", Museum of Fine Arts, Houston, TX

"Manif Seoul ’96", Seoul Arts Center, Seoul, Korea

- 1995: "Convergence", Davis/McClain Gallery, Pennzoil Place, Houston, TX
- "Recent Work", Moody Gallery, Houston, TX
- 1994: Blue Star Art Space, San Antonio, TX

Museum of East Texas, Lufkin

- 1993: "Artists’ Progress: Seven Houston Artists, 1943–1993"

Glassell School of Art/ Museum of Fine Arts, Houston, TX

- 1992: "Recent Prints", Shark's Incorporated, Boulder, CO

"New Texas Art", Cheney Coles Museum, Spokanne WA
The Boise Art Museum, Boise, ID

- 1991: "Recent Works", Moody's Gallery, Houston, TX

Austin University, Nacogdoches, TX and Transco Gallery, Houston, TX

- 1990: "Printmaking in Texas: the 1980’s"

Modern Art Museum of Fort Worth, TX

- 1989: "Just Paint", Blue Start Art Space, San Antonio, TX
- 1988: "Texas Art: An Exhibition Selected from the Menil Collection, The Museum Of Fine Arts, Houston and the Trustee’s Collections of the Contemporary Arts Museum, Richmond Hall, Houston, TX
- 1987: "Monotypes" Cathleen Gallander and Susan Lang Gallery, NYC, NY
- 1986: "Third Western States Exhibition", The Brooklyn Museum, NY
- 1985: "Fresh Paint: The Houston School", Museum of Fine Arts, Houston, TX
- 1984: "Monotypes", Moody Gallery, Houston, TX
- 1983: "New Art from a New City", Salzburger Kunstverein, Salzburg, Austria
- 1982: "Our Time, Houston’s Contemporary Arts Museum 1948–1982", Contemporary Art Museum, Houston, TX
- 1981: "Paintings and Drawings", Moody Gallery, Houston, TX
- 1980: "Response", Tyler Museum of Art, Tyler, TX
- 1979: "Fire", Contemporary Arts Museum, Houston, TX
- 1978: "Art of Texas", The Renaissance Society, University of Chicago, IL
- 1977: "Paintings and Drawings", Lerner–Heller Gallery, NYC, NY
- 1976: Pelham–Von Stoffler Gallery, Houston, TX
- 1975: "One Man Show", Contemporary Arts Museum, Houston, TX
- 1974: "Abstract Painting and Sculpture", Museum of Fine Arts, Houston, TX
- 1973: "Houston Invitational Exhibition", Contemporary Arts Museum, TX
- 1972: "Contemporary Arts Museum, Dallas-Fort Worth-Houston Invitational Exhibition", Houston, TX
- 1971: "Other Coasts", California State University, Long Beach, CA
- 1970: "Dick Wray Paintings", The Museum of Fine Arts School of Art, Houston
- 1969: "Tamarind Homage to Lithography", Museum of Modern Art, NYC, NY
- 1968: Hemisfair, San Antonio, TX
- 1967: New Arts Gallery, Houston, TX
- 1966: "Dick Wray, New Works", St. Mary's University, San Antonio, TX
- 1965: "100 Contemporary American Drawings", Museum of Art, University of Michigan, Ann Arbor, MI
- 1964: Tamarind Lithography Workshop, Los Angeles, CA – Guest Artist
- 1963: "Dick Wray Drawings", Louisiana Gallery, Houston, TX
- 1962: "Southwest Painting and Sculpture Exhibition" Museum of Fine Arts, Houston, TX
- 1961: "Ways and Means", Contemporary Arts Museum, Houston, TX
- 1960: "Dick Wray Paintings", Louisiana Gallery, Houston, TX
- 1959: Beaumont Art Museum, Beaumont, TX

== Collections ==
His works are in the following public and corporate collections:

- Albright–Knox Art Gallery, Buffalo, NY
- Amarillo Art Center, Amarillo, TX
- Chase Manhattan Bank, NYC, NY
- Contemporary Arts Museum, Houston, TX
- East Texas Museum of Art, Tyler, TX
- Modern Art Museum of Fort Worth, Fort Worth, TX
- Museum of Fine Arts, Houston, TX
- Museum of Modern Art, NYC, NY
- Museum of South Texas, Corpus Christi, TX
- National Gallery of Art, Washington, DC
- Paine–Webber/ Rotan Mosle, Houston, TX
- Palm Springs Desert Museum, Palm Springs, CA
- San Antonio Museum of Art, San Antonio, TX
- Southern Methodist University, Dallas, TX
- University of Oklahoma, Norman, OK
- Wilson Industries, Houston, TX
- Witte Memorial Museum, San Antonio, TX

== Publications ==
- Kalil, Barbara Rose, Susie (1985). Fresh paint : the Houston school : the Museum of Fine Arts, Houston. Austin, Tex.: Texas Monthly Press. ISBN 0-87719-000-3.
- Texas modern : the rediscovery of early Texas abstraction (1935-1965). Waco, Tex.: Martin Museum of Art, Baylor University. 2007. ISBN 978-0-9790185-0-3.
- Lucie-Smith, Edward (1985). American art now (1st U.S. ed.). N.Y.: W. Morrow. ISBN 0-688-05884-1.
- Surls, created by the Texas art team; written by Catherine D. Anspon with a preface by James; Marks, foreword by Lester (2010). Texas artists today (1st ed.). Seattle: Marquand Books, Inc. ISBN 978-0615390161.
- Jones, Annette Carlozzi; with portraits of the artists by Gay Block. Comp. by Laurel (1986). 50 Texas artists : a crit. selection of painters and sculptors working in Texas. San Francisco: Chronicle Books. ISBN 0-87701-399-3.
- Patricia Covo Johnson (1995). Contemporary Art in Texas. Craftsman House, Roseville East, New South Wales. 240 pp.
- Greene, Alison de Lima (2000). Texas: 150 Works from the Museum of Fine Arts, Houston. Harry N. Abrams, Inc., Publishers. New York, New York, 279 pp. [with contributions by Shannon Halwes, Kathleen Robinson, Robert Montgomery, Monica Garza, Jason Goldstein, and Alejandra Jiménez]
- Langdon Review of The Arts In Texas 2005:Vol 2 (2005-2006. ed.). Stephenville, TX: Tarleton State University. 2005. ISBN 0-9759819-0-0.
- Reynolds, Sarah C. (2008). Houston reflections : art in the city, 1950s, 60s, and 70s. Houston: Rice University Press. ISBN 978-0-89263-005-9.
