= International Day for Monuments and Sites =

Annual observance on 18 April

The International Day for Monuments and Sites, also known as World Heritage Day, is an international observance held on April 18 each year around the world with different types of activities, including visits to monuments and heritage sites, conferences, round tables, and newspaper articles. Each year the International Council on Monuments and sites elects a theme, for example sustainable tourism in 2017 and rural landscapes in 2019.

== History ==
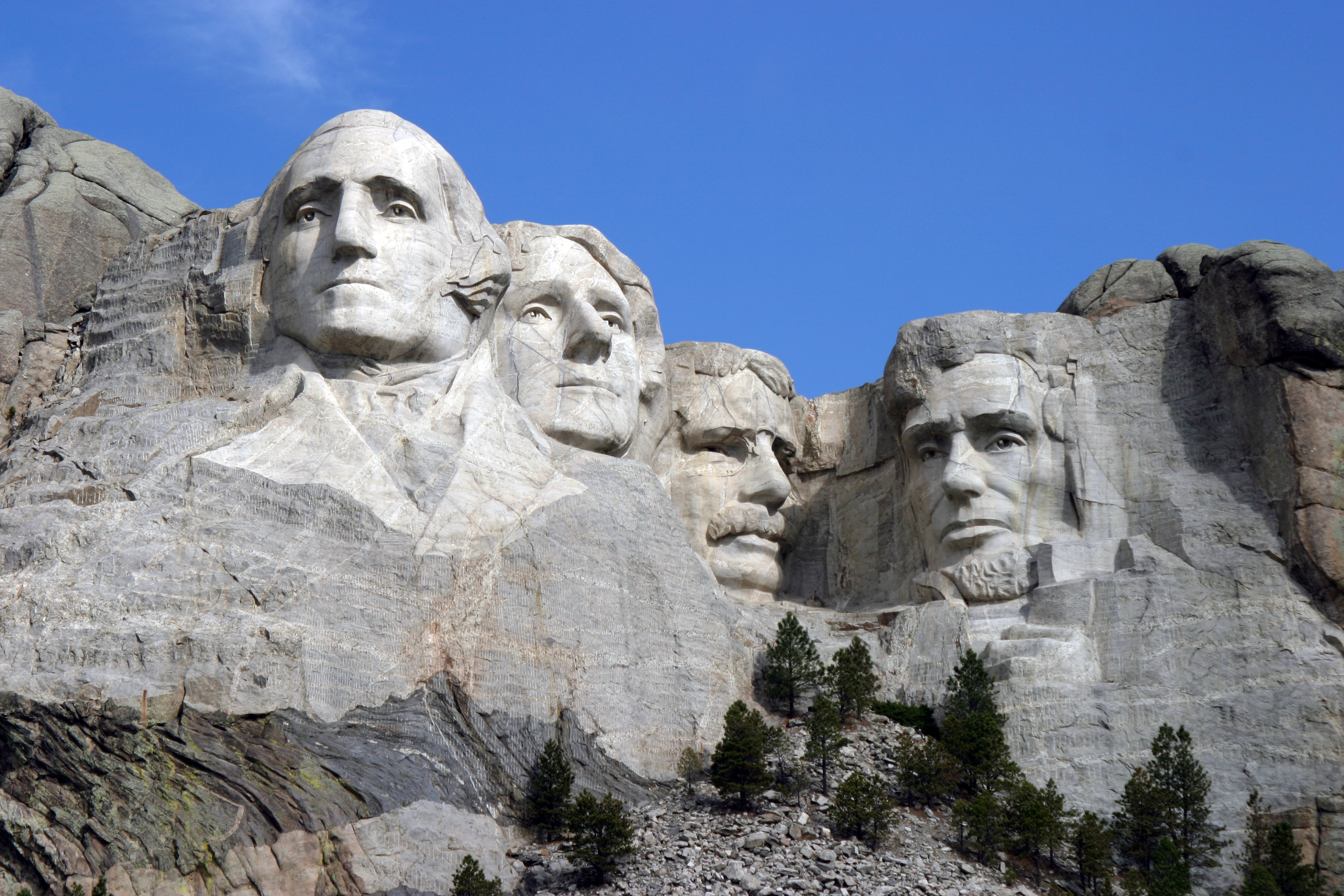
Mount Rushmore, located in the Black Hills of South Dakota, USA, represents the nation's foundation, expansion, development, and preservation.

The International Day for Monuments and Sites was proposed by the International Council on Monuments and Sites (ICOMOS) on 18 April 1982 and approved by the General Assembly of UNESCO in 1983 during the assembly's 22nd general conference. The aim is to promote awareness about the diversity of humanity's cultural heritage, its vulnerability, and the efforts required for its protection and conservation.

For 2023, the theme "Heritage Changes" was chosen.

== Convention Concerning the Protection of the World Cultural and Natural Heritage ==
The Convention Concerning the Protection of the World Cultural and Natural Heritage defines a monument as:

Monuments: architectural works, works of monumental sculpture and painting, elements or structures of an archaeological nature, inscriptions, cave dwellings and combinations of features, which are of outstanding universal value from the point of view of history, art or science.

== International Year of the Monument ==
International Year of the Monument
- Observed by: countries
- Type: Worldwide
- Significance: Protection of the World Cultural and Natural Heritage.
- Date: 1964
- Duration: Perpetual
- Started by: UNESCO
- Related to: Monument

The International Year of the Monument was a commemorative date created by UNESCO in 1964. The implementation of the date was to give a better global coverage in the perception of the monument as a building or historical site of exemplary character, for its significance in the life trajectory of a society and its people. There are monuments built especially to celebrate or reminisce about an episode, moment or character of our history, created by architects, sculptors, and artists, often commissioned by world leaders or organizations. Others are remnants of the past that survived the time and are consecrated by society as collective symbols, and as references of the memory of a people.
