= Norman Bluhm =

American painter

- Untitled (1984)
- Born: March 28, 1921
- Died: February 3, 1999 (aged 77)
- Education: Armour Institute of Technology, Chicago, Illinois; Academia de Belle Arte, Florence, Italy; Ecole des Beaux Arts, Paris, France
- Known for: Painting
- Movement: Abstract Expressionism, Action Painting, Lyrical Abstraction

Norman Bluhm (March 28, 1921 – February 3, 1999), was an American painter classified as an abstract expressionist, and as an action painter.

== Biography ==
He was born on March 28, 1921, in Chicago, Illinois. His father Henry Bluhm was of Polish Jewish ancestry from Bialystok, Poland. His mother Rosa Goldstein is listed in the 1940 census as having Russian born parents with Russian spoken at home He studied under Mies van der Rohe at the then Armour (now Illinois) Institute of Technology. After service in World War II with the USAAF he resumed his architectural studies until 1948. After he studied art at the Accademia di Belle Arti di Firenze, Florence, Italy and at the Ecole des Beaux Arts in Paris. From 1948 until 1956 he lived in Paris. He had numerous friends in art, literature, and other creative fields. Among his close acquaintances were Joan Mitchell, Sam Francis, Jean-Paul Riopelle, Zao Wou-ki and others. He was married to Claude Souvrain until 1956. He returned to the United States in 1956. He married Carolyn Ogle in 1961. They lived in New York City until 1969 with their two children, David and Nina. From 1970 to 1980 they lived in Millbrook, New York. From 1980 to 1987 they lived in East Hampton, New York. Thereafter, they lived in East Wallingford, Vermont until Bluhm's death on February 3, 1999.

== Art ==
Bluhm's work has been critically praised and his works are in the collections of many major museums. His career is marked by notable stylistic shifts as he continually challenged himself to reach new areas of artistic achievements based on his profound knowledge of art and art history, use of the human figure, color, and a passion for life. Although his style changed dramatically over time, he remained deeply interested in gestural abstraction, and the ethos of Abstract Expressionism. Among his more noted work are a series of poem paintings done with his good friend the poet Frank O'Hara. Shortly before Bluhm died, in 1999, Art in America editor Raphael Rubinstein predicted that the works Bluhm made in the 1980s and 1990s at the end of his career would be as important to the 21st century as Cézanne’s later output was to the 20th.

== Comments ==
Bluhm's work while recognized and praised has never received the measure of attention that some of his contemporaries, such as Joan Mitchell and Riopelle, have. In part, this is due to Bluhm's unwillingness to cater sufficiently to those in the commercial art world. Also changing art tastes in the 60's with the advent of Pop Art (which Bluhm found utterly lacking in beauty and passion) placed Bluhm in a critical netherworld.

The Estate of Norman Bluhm, in partnership with Edizioni Mazotta, Milan, published a monograph in 2000 on Norman Bluhm with essays by James Harithas, Raphael Rubinstein and Luigi Sansone.

In 2007, the Station Museum of Contemporary Art in Houston, Texas, organized a major exhibition under the title 'The Late Paintings of Norman Bluhm'. The Houston Press reported that The New York artist’s panoramic paintings are patterned like stained glass windows or mandalas, but the shapes inside are sexy while Garland Fielder's review at Glasstire mentioned that Bluhm’s paintings project such a life-affirming and honest candor, one cannot help but feel awash in a glow of spiritual joy.

In 2015, Christie's New York held "Norman Bluhm: Divine Proportion", showing works form the 1960s, 70s and 80s. The exhibition catalog reproduced James Harithas's introduction to Bluhm's 1973 show at the Everson Museum as well as a 1987 interview of the artist conducted by William Salzillo.

From February - May, 2020, a retrospective of his work, "Norman Bluhm: Metamorphosis" was held at the Newark Museum, with a catalog that published essays about his work as well as an interview conducted with the artist by Paul Cummings in 1969. The exhibit was curated by Tricia Laughlin Bloom, the Newark Museum of Art’s curator for American art, and guest curated by Jay Grimm, a close friend of Bluhm.
