= ArtCar Museum =

Art Car Museum
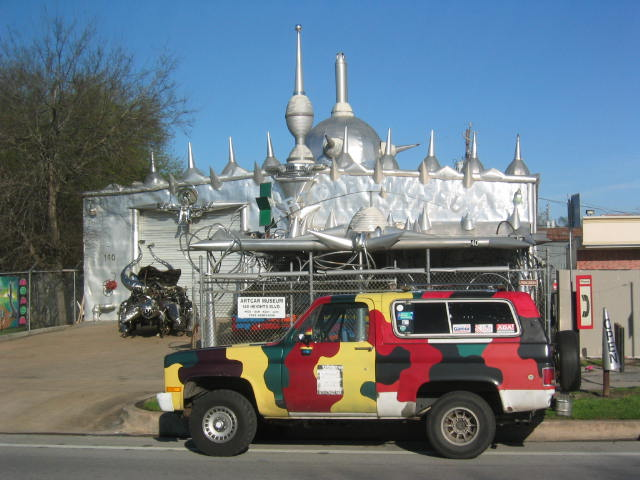
- Art Car Museum - 140 Heights Blvd

- Location within Texas ArtCar Museum (the United States)
- Established: February 1998
- Location: Houston, Texas
- Coordinates: 29°46′19.56″N 95°23′49.56″W
- Type: Art museum
- Collection size: Automobiles
- Website: www.artcarmuseum.com

The Art Car Museum is a private museum of contemporary art located in Houston, Texas, United States. The museum, nicknamed the "Garage Mahal," opened in February, 1998. Its emphasis is on art cars, fine arts, and artists that are rarely seen in other cultural institutions. The museum's mission is to elevate awareness of the political, economic, and personal dimensions of art.

The museum was founded by Ann Harithas, artist and long-time supporter of the Art Car movement, and James Harithas, former director of the Corcoran Gallery of Art, Washington, D.C., the Everson Museum of Art, Syracuse, New York, the Contemporary Arts Museum Houston and late director of the Station Museum, Houston, Texas.

The museum showroom celebrates the spirit of this post-modern age of car-culture, in which artists have remolded stock cars to the specifications of their own idiosyncratic images and visions. The museum features elaborate art cars, lowriders, and mobile contraptions, as well as organizing a number of temporary exhibitions by local, national, and international artists, some accompanied by catalogs, such as a retrospective of the social/political, pointillist paintings by Houston artist Ron Hoover (1944-2008) held in 2010. and a survey of the work of artist John Atlas in 2014.

The museum is scheduled to re-open in The Orange Show. Previously it was located at 140 Heights Blvd, Houston, TX 77007, which began operations in 1998. The Houston Heights location closed in April 2024.

== See also ==
- Art car
- Houston Art Car Parade
- List of museums in the Texas Gulf Coast
