= Vochol =

Automobile

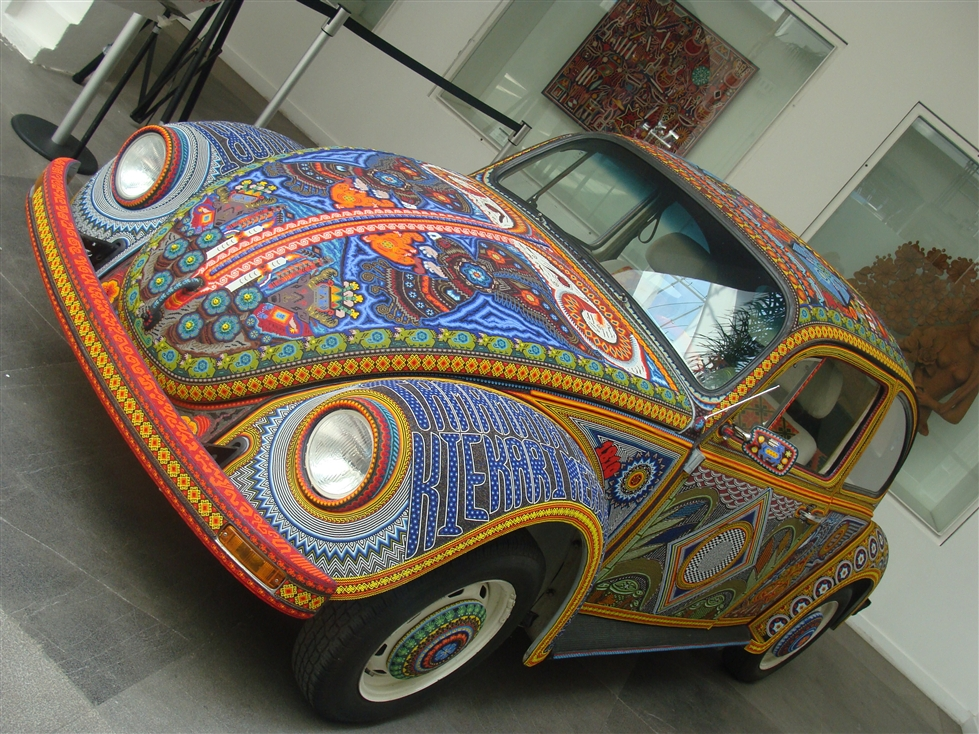
View of the Vochol

The Vochol is a Volkswagen (VW) Beetle that has been decorated with traditional Huichol (Wixárika) beadwork from the center-west of Mexico. The name created by José Jaime Volochinsky is a combination of "vocho", a popular term for VW Beetles in Mexico, and "Huichol", the common name of the Wirrárika indigenous group. The project was sponsored by agencies associated with the Museo de Arte Popular, Mexico City, the states of Jalisco and Nayarit and other public and private organizations. The Volkswagen was covered in 2,277,000 beads applied by eight artisans from two Huichol families in an exclusive design based on Huichol culture.

== Sponsorship and purpose ==
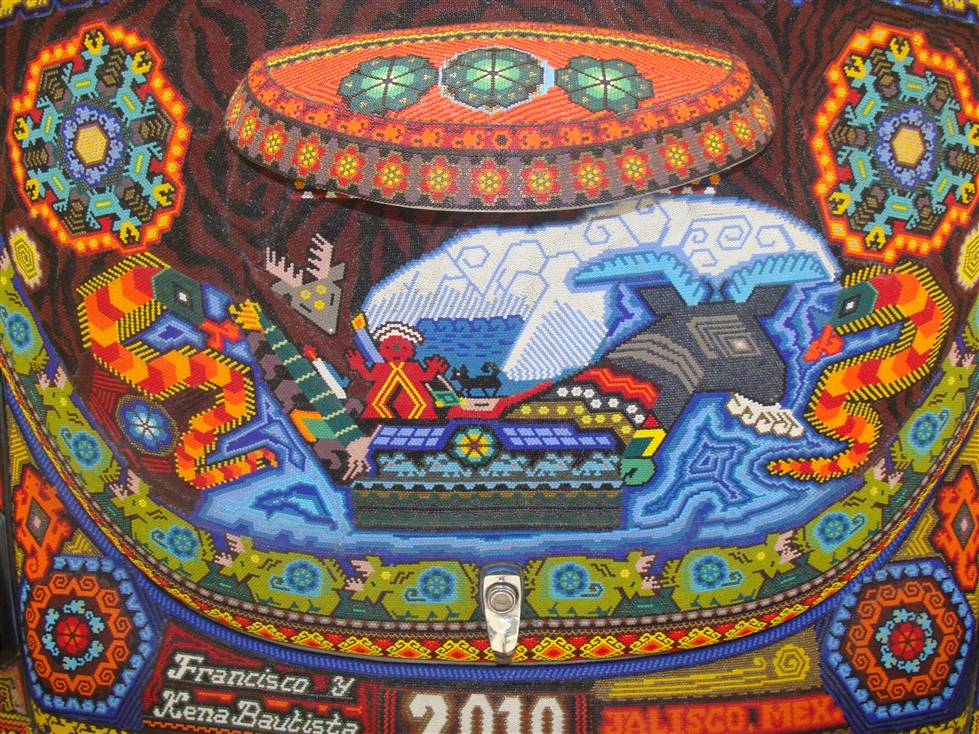
Back panel (over motor) of the Vochol

The work was sponsored by a number of private and public organizations including the Association of Friends of the Museo de Arte Popular, Secretaría de Cultura del Gobierno of the state of Jalisco and the Consejo Estatal para la Cultura y las Artes of the state of Nayarit. The purpose of the work was to create a folk art project for the 21st century that demonstrated the ritual nature, skill and culture of Huichol beadwork. Beadwork is a traditional Huichol craft that began by decorating bull horns, then gourds, masks, and jaguar head figures. Originally the craft was done with seeds, but is today done with plastic and glass beads. The craft is still evolving and the beadwork can be found on various modern materials, such as glass, stone, ceramics and metal. Traditionally, the beads are affixed with a kind of wax that comes from Campeche.

== The work ==
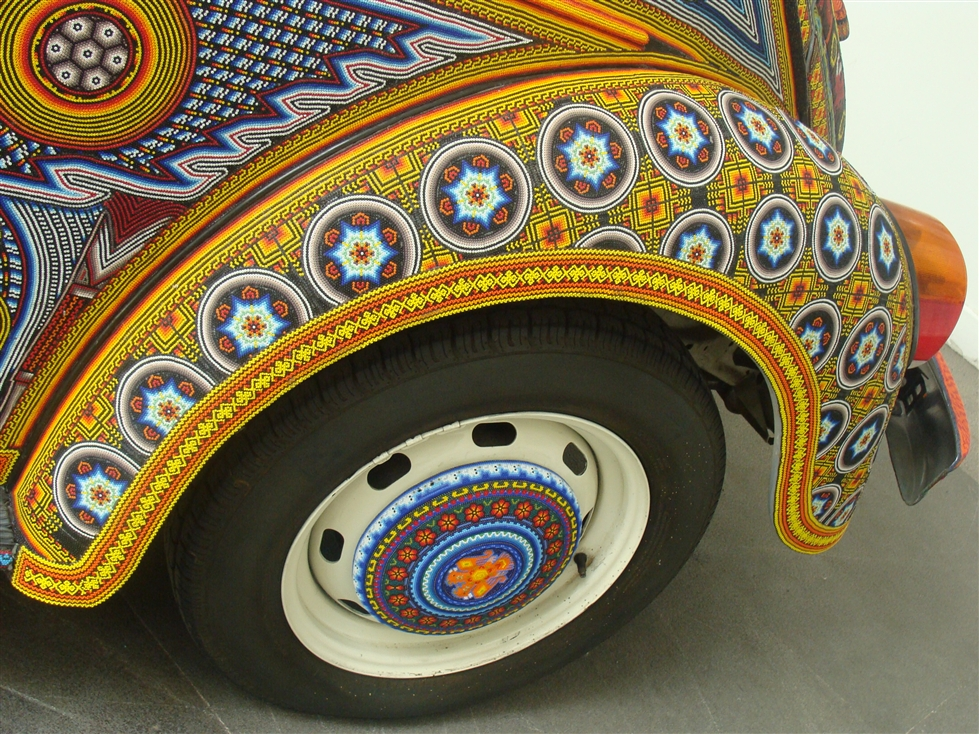
View of a decorated fender

The work was created by eight artisans from two Huichol families, the Bautistas from state of Jalisco and the Ortiz from the state of Nayarit. The artisans worked under the direction of Francisco Bautista to decorate the chassis and interior of the vehicle in an exclusive design. For the artisans, the car was not only a source of employment, but also a way to promote their art and craftsmanship. The artisans clocked 4,760 hours using 2,277,000 beads that weighed ninety kilograms and fastened with sixteen kilograms of resin that can withstand 200 °C. The project at the Hospicio Cabañas in Guadalajara lasted over seven months and began in May 2010. At a later stage, work continued at the Centro Estatal para las Culturas Populares e Indígenas in Nayarit. The final touches were placed on the car at the Museo de Arte Popular in Mexico City.

The images represent Huichol deities and culture. These include, on the car's hood, two snakes above clouds, which represent rain. The back has images of offerings, and a canoe steered by a shaman. The sides show the gods of the sun, fire, corn, deer, and peyote, all important to the Huichol culture. The roof contains a large sun and four eagles, which represent the union between man and the gods. There is also an Eye of God, which is a figure with five points. The center represents the source of life, the east represents light, strength and knowledge. The west is associated with the history of the ancestors; the south is associated with agriculture and the north is where history ends or the culmination of the elements. These directions are associated with the states of Jalisco (center), San Luis Potosí (east), Nayarit (west), Colima and Michoacán (south) and Durango (north). The front fenders contain the phrase "200 years of Independence" and "100 years since the Mexican Revolution" in the Wixarika language.

== Presentation and future of the work ==
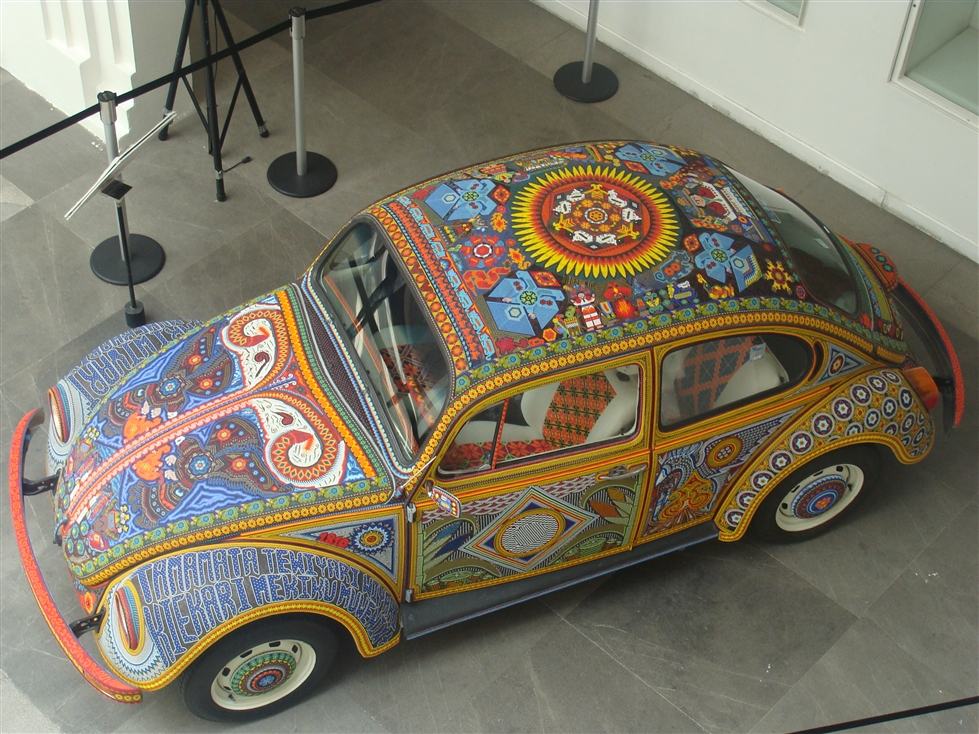
View of the car from above

After work was completed, the VW Beetle was unveiled at the eighth edition of the Zona MACO (México Arte Contemporáneo) in Guadalajara by the president of the Consejo Nacional para la Cultura y las Artes (Conaculta), Consuelo Sáizar in December 2010. Afterwards, the car was taken to the Museo de Arte Popular in Mexico City for exhibition. The next step is an international tour to have the work displayed in museums in various parts of the world including the United States, Europe, Asia, the Middle East and South America.

The Vochol is currently on display at the Museo de Arte Popular in Mexico City.
