= Houston Art Car Parade =

Annual event in Houston, Texas

Coordinates: 29.7590°N 95.3762°W

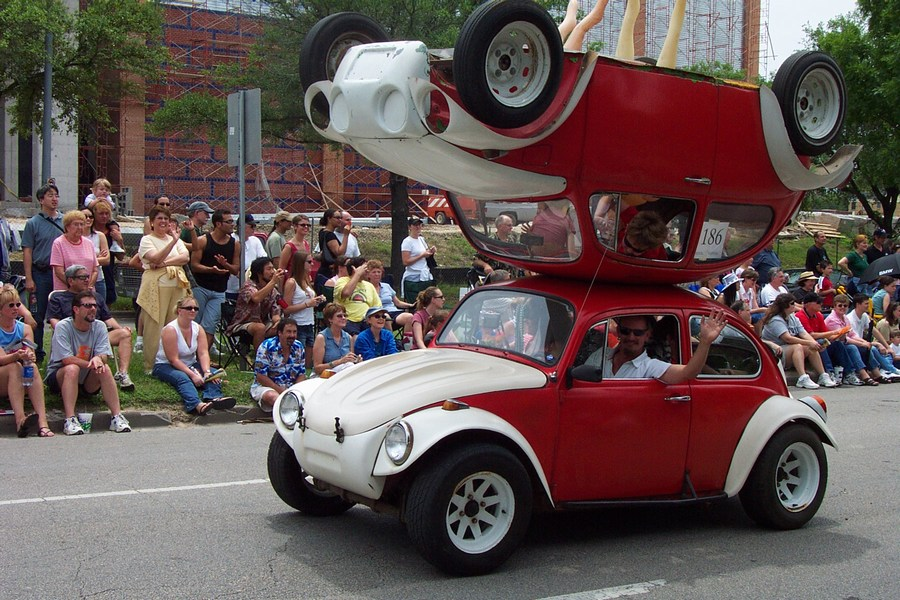
2004 Parade entry

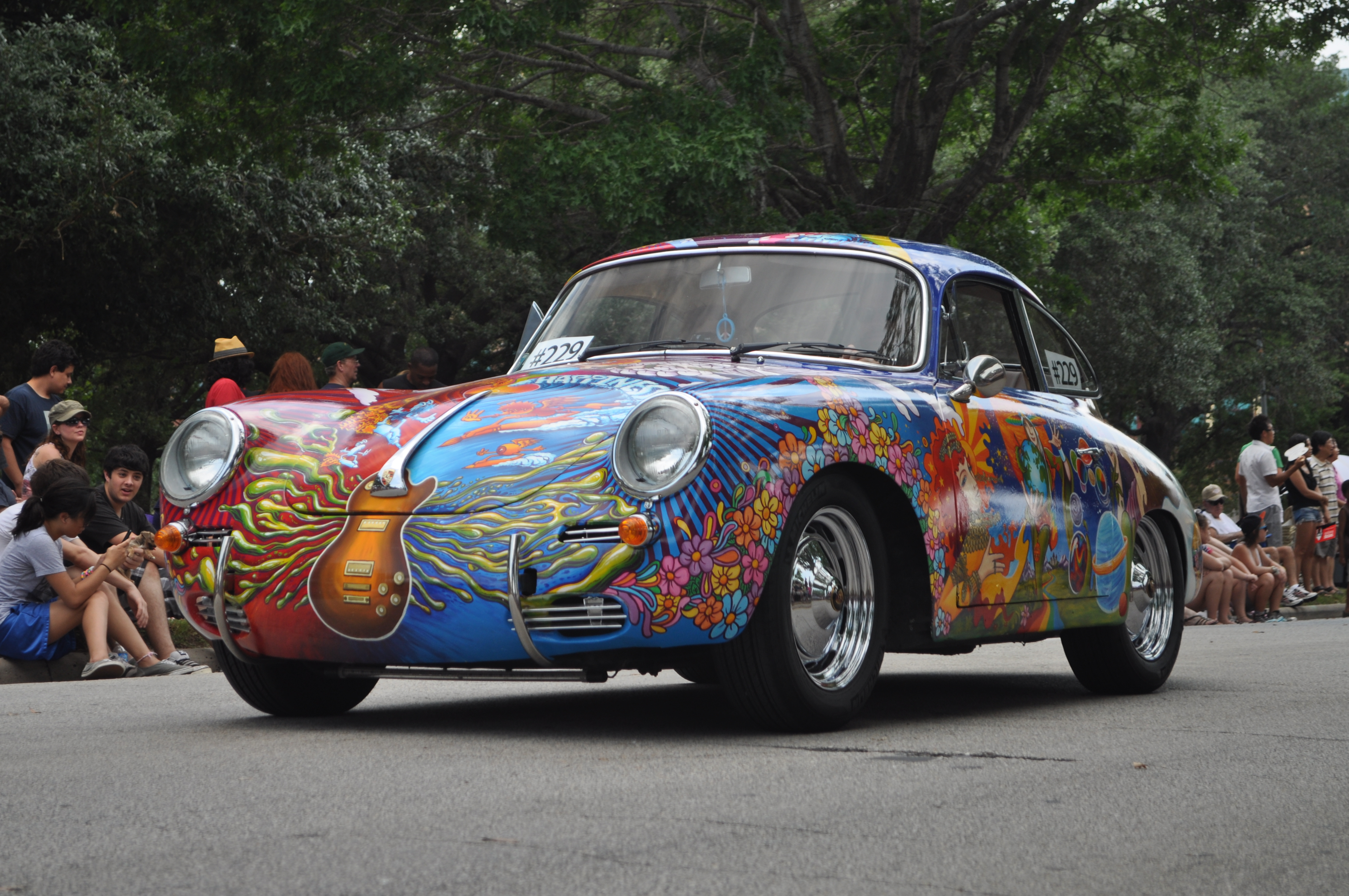
2011 Parade Entry

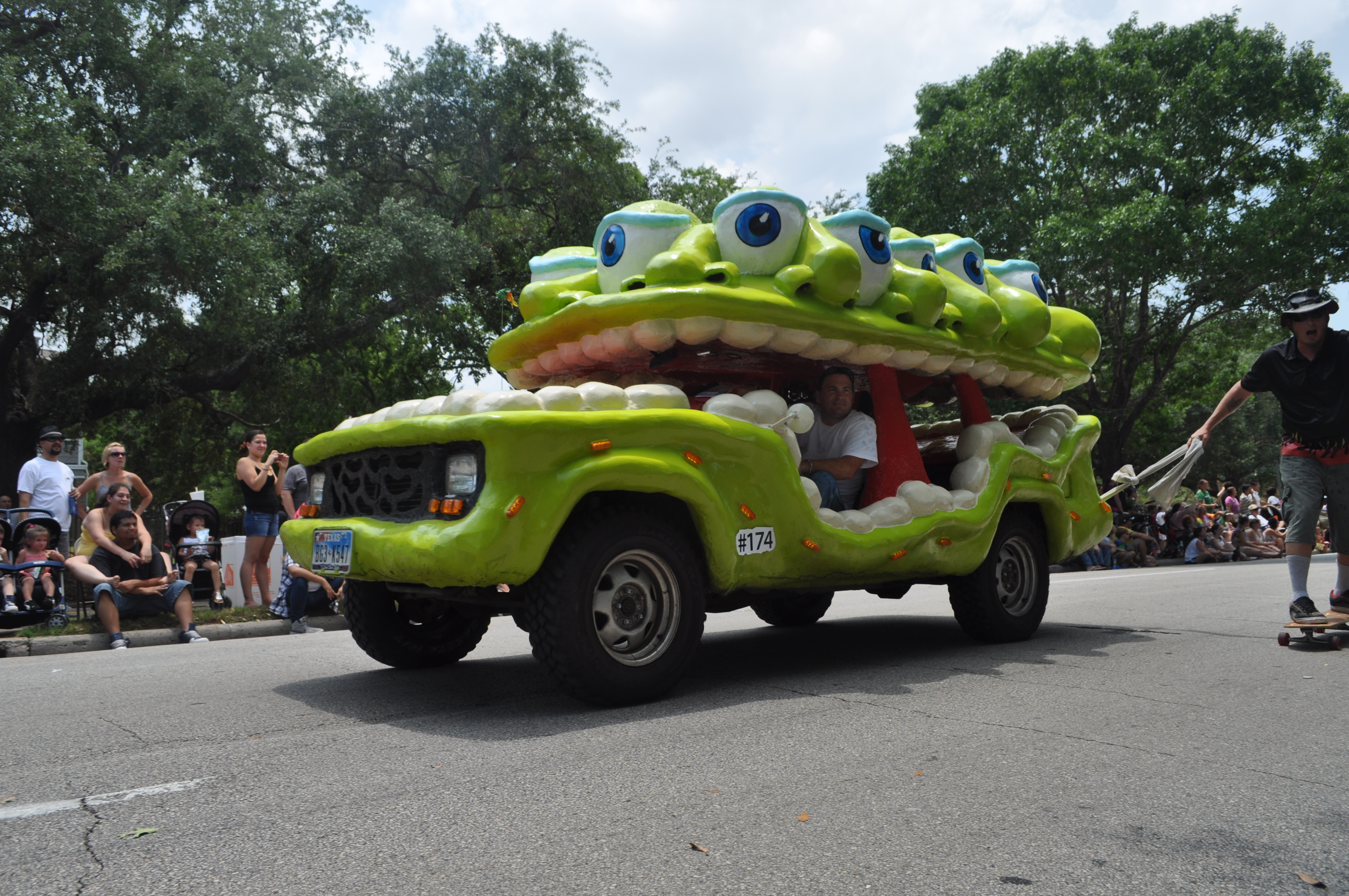
2011 Parade Entry

The Houston Art Car Parade is an annual event in Houston, Texas, featuring a display of all types of rolling art. The first art car parade took place on May 14, 1986, when 11 vehicles participated in a parade down Montrose Boulevard in the Neartown area. In later years the parade moved to Allen Parkway, then to Smith Street in Downtown Houston, passing Houston City Hall. Dan Aykroyd served as the grand marshal for the 2010 parade.

== Origins ==
It began at The Orange Show Foundation's annual gala in 1984 when an old Ford station wagon was donated for auctioning. A local artist decorated the car with plastic fruit and transformed the car into the Fruitmobile. The auction winner donated the car back to the foundation.

The Fruitmobile proved to be popular and The Orange Show Foundation organized a "Road Show" in 1986 to show off other decorated automobiles. In 1988, the Houston International Festival asked the Orange Show Foundation to organize an art car parade. That parade featured 40 art cars, marching bands and about 2,000 spectators.

== See also ==
- Art car
- ArtCar Museum
