= Barbosa (surname) =

Barbosa (sometimes Barbossa) is a Portuguese and later also Southern Galician surname. It may refer to:

== Barbosa (single s) ==
- Adoniran Barbosa (a.k.a. João Rubinato, 1910–1982), Brazilian singer and composer
- Agostinho Barbosa (1589–1649), Portuguese writer on canon law
- Alexandrina Barbosa (born 1986), Portuguese professional handball player
- Anderson Barbosa (born 1974), Brazilian professional footballer
- Anggisu Barbosa (born 1993), Indonesian professional footballer
- António Barbosa (born 1931), Portuguese footballer
- Arthur Barbosa (1908–1995), British illustrator
- Bárbara Micheline do Monte Barbosa, Brazilian soccer player/goalkeeper
- Benedito Ruy Barbosa (1931– 2026), Brazilian screenwriter
- Bruno da Silva Barbosa (born 1988), Brazilian professional footballer
- Cândido Barbosa (born 1974), Portuguese professional race car driver
- Carlos Barbosa (1944–2025), Colombian actor
- Carlos Alberto Barbosa (1954–1982), Brazilian footballer
- Cédric Barbosa (born 1976), French professional footballer
- César Barbosa (born 1954), Colombian biologist
- Chris Barbosa (1961–2024), American music producer
- Cristiano Borro Barbosa (born 1976), Brazilian-born priest, bishop elect of Boston
- Daniel Camargo Barbosa (1930–1994), prolific Colombian serial killer and rapist
- Dario Barbosa (1882–1965), Brazilian Olympic sport shooter
- Dario Villares Barbosa (1880–1952), Brazilian painter
- Diego Barbosa (born 1996), Mexican professional footballer
- Domingos Caldas Barbosa (c. 1739–1800), Brazilian poet and musician
- Duarte Barbosa (c. late 15th century–1521), Portuguese writer and explorer
- Euclydes Barbosa (a.k.a. Jaú, 1909–1988), Brazilian professional footballer
- Everaldo Barbosa (born 1975), Brazilian professional footballer
- Frederico Barbosa (born 1961), Brazilian poet
- Gabriel Barbosa (born 1996), Brazilian professional footballer
- Givaldo Barbosa (born 1954), Brazilian professional tennis player
- Hélder Barbosa (born 1987), Portuguese professional footballer
- Henrique Barbosa (born 1984), Brazilian Olympic swimmer
- Jade Barbosa (born 1991), Brazilian Olympic gymnast
- João Barbosa (born 1975), Portuguese professional race car driver
- João Tamagnini Barbosa (1883–1948), Portuguese army brigadier and politician
- Joaquim Barbosa (born 1953), Brazilian justice minister
- Jorge Barbosa (1902–1971), Cape Verdean poet and writer
- José Barbosa (pole vaulter) (1929–2015), Puerto Rican Olympic pole vaulter
- José Celso Barbosa (1857–1921), Puerto Rican physician, sociologist, and politician
- José Luíz Barbosa (a.k.a. Zequinha Barbosa, born 1961), Brazilian Olympic athlete
- José Vicente Barbosa du Bocage (1823–1907), Portuguese zoologist and politician
- Julia Barbosa Landois (born 1959), American artist
- Leandro Barbosa (born 1982), Brazilian professional basketball player
- Luciano Barbosa (born 1976), Brazilian professional squash player
- Luis Barbosa (born 1953), Colombian Olympic runner
- Lula Barbosa (born 1970), Brazilian professional beach volleyball player
- Madalena Barbosa (1942–2008), Portuguese activist
- Manuel Maria Barbosa du Bocage (1765–1805), Portuguese poet
- Marcelo Barbosa (born 1975), Brazilian guitar player and music professor
- Marcia Barbosa, Brazilian physicist
- Mariano Barbosa (born 1984), Argentine professional footballer
- Marina Ruy Barbosa (born 1995), Brazilian actress
- Moacir Barbosa Nascimento (1921–2000), Brazilian professional footballer (goalkeeper)
- Nélia Barbosa (born 1998), French paracanoeist
- Octávio Barbosa (1907–1997), Brazilian geologist
- Pablo Barbosa (1815–c. 1900), Mexican benefactor, farmer, cattle rancher, and landowner
- Palmira Barbosa (born 1961), Angolan Olympic athlete
- Pedro Barbosa (born 1970), Portuguese professional footballer
- Pedro Barbosa (jurist) (1530/35–1606), Portuguese jurist
- Pilar Barbosa (de Rosario) (1898–1997), Puerto Rican educator, historian and political activist
- Rivaldo Barbosa (chief of police) (born 1969), Brazilian chief of police
- Roberto Firmino Barbosa de Oliveira (born 1991), Brazilian footballer
- Rodrigo Barbosa (born 1988), Brazilian professional race car driver
- Rui Barbosa (a.k.a. Ruy Barbosa, 1849–1923), Brazilian writer, jurist, and politician
- Timotea Barbosa (a.k.a. Doña Timo, 1860–1930), Mexican benefactor
- Vera Barbosa (born 1989), Portuguese Olympic track and field athlete
- Luana Barbosa dos Reis (1981–2016), victim of police brutality
- William da Silva Barbosa (born 1978), Brazilian professional footballer
- Willian Xavier Barbosa (born 1983), Brazilian professional footballer

== Barbossa (double s) ==
- Wesley So's maternal family name under Philippine name conventions is "Barbossa", i.e. "Barbossa" is the maiden name of So's biological mother.

== In fiction ==
- Hector Barbossa, a fictional character from Pirates of the Caribbean

== See also ==
- Barboza
- Barbarossa (disambiguation)
