= Graham Reynolds (composer) =

American musician (born 1971)

- Born: Graham Eric Reynolds; March 5, 1971 (age 55); Frankfurt, Germany (U.S. Army Base)
- Occupations: Bandleader, pianist, composer
- Instruments: Piano, drums
- Years active: 1995–present
- Website: www.grahamreynolds.com

Graham Eric Reynolds (born March 5, 1971) is an American musician and composer based in Austin, Texas. He composes music for a wide range of media including dance, theater, television and film.

== Golden Arm Trio ==
Reynolds' regular performance and recording group is the jazz-based Golden Arm Trio, of which Reynolds is the only consistent member. The Golden Arm Trio has released four CDs, including Why the Sea is Salt and The Tick-Tock Club, and performed across the United States. Their music was also featured on the soundtrack of the film A Scanner Darkly. The Austin Chronicle compared the group's experimentalism to the work of John Cage or Raymond Scott.

== Golden Hornet ==
In the 1990s, Reynolds and fellow composer-bandleader Peter Stopschinski, also from the Austin rock and punk scene, established the Golden Hornet organisation, applying the D.I.Y methods of the rock scene to classical music. Their first production was "Six Pieces for String Quartet" (1999) performed by Tosca String Quartet. The organisation subsequently collaborated with several other local bands, opera groups, and orchestras, with all works produced, curated, and commissioned by Reynolds and Stopschinski, including Mozart's "Requiem Undead" (2014), which featured over 150 artists performing, including DJ Spooky and Caroline Shaw.

In 2008, Golden Hornet received official 501(c)3 designation and has since grown in capacity, with Reynolds continuing as Artistic Director.

== Film ==
After a number of experimental shorts and live scores for silent films, Reynolds's first feature film score was a Western, The Journeyman (2001). In 2003, he composed a piano score for Richard Linklater's documentary short Live from Shiva's Dance Floor, and went on to compose scores for several of Linklater's films, including A Scanner Darkly (which featured acoustic instruments and electric guitar processed through computer effects, and was named "Best Soundtrack of the Decade" by Cinema Retro magazine), Bernie (2011), Up to Speed (2012), Before Midnight (2013), and Hit Man (2023). He also provided scores for HBO's The Diplomat (2015), and Rooster Teeth's series Day 5 (2016-2017). He has composed and performed several live scores for silent films, including Battleship Potemkin (1925), Nosferatu (1922), Wings (1927), Metropolis (1927) and Alfred Hitchcock's The Lodger (1927).

== Theater ==
Reynolds began working in theatre in high school. His first collaboration with Rude Mechanicals (Rude Mechs) was In The House of Moles (2000), and he joined the company in 2003, going on to compose music and sound for nine other works, including Creative Capital award-winning The Method Gun (2007), Lincoln Center commission Stop Hitting Yourself (2014), and Yale Repertory commission Field Guide (2017). He simultaneously developed a relationship with the Salvage Vanguard Theater, working with Ruth Margraff on Cry Pitch Carrolls (1999), the first in a series of collaborations, and The Intergalactic Nemesis (2000), which split off from the company and toured internationally for nearly a decade.

== Dance ==
In his career, Reynolds worked on short experimental dance collaborations with the Ellen Bartel Dance Collective, which grew into several projects with Andrea Ariel. Since then, he has worked on six large-scale works with choreographer Stephen Mills of Ballet Austin, both recorded and live performance scores, including: Cult of Color, a collaboration with visual artist Trenton Doyle Hancock; Belle Redux; and Bounce, which went on a 17-date tour across China. In 2016, Mills expanded Bounce and other works by Reynolds into a full-length production entitled The Graham Reynolds Project.

He has also collaborated several times with site-specific choreographer Allison Orr from Forklift Danceworks, starting in 2009 with Trash Dance, which was also the subject of a making-of documentary by Andy Garrison. Reynolds also provided live scoring for the My Park, My Pool, My City series, as well as Served.

== Other activities ==
Reynolds is a member of the City of Austin Music Commission.

In 2025, Reynolds released the album Mountain, his first solo album.

== Awards and recognition ==
Reynolds won a $95,000 Creative Capital Award in 2016, and has won support from the National Endowment for the Arts for several projects. He has also won an Independent Music Award, two Frederick R. Loewe Music Theatre Awards, nine Austin Critics Table Awards, the John Bustin Award, multiple Austin Chronicle Best Composer wins, and a B. Iden Payne Award.
