= Barbarossa =

Barbarossa, a name meaning "red beard" in Italian, primarily refers to:

- Frederick Barbarossa (1122–1190), Holy Roman Emperor
- Hayreddin Barbarossa (c. 1478–1546), Ottoman admiral
- Operation Barbarossa, the Axis invasion of the Soviet Union in World War II, commencing 22 June 1941

It may also refer to:

== Arts and entertainment ==
=== Fictional characters ===
- Barbarossa, pirate and protagonist in the 1953 film Raiders of the Seven Seas
- Barbarossa (Dune), in the Legends of Dune trilogy
- Barbarossa, in the book Thief Lord
- Barbarossa, a commander in the 2014 anime Lord Marksman and Vanadis

=== Music ===
- Barbarossa (album), 1996, by Cubanate
- Barbarossa, a 2001 album by Orplid
- "Barbarossa", a 1994 song by Sordid Humor
- "Barbarossa", a 1993 song by Sex Gang Children
- "Barbarossa", a 2012 song by Lamb of God

=== Games ===
- Barbarossa (board game), by Klaus Teuber
- Barbarossa (card game), by Arclight Games
- Barbarossa: The Russo-German War 1941-45, a 1969 board wargame published by Simulations Publications Inc.
- Barbarossa (video game), a 1992 war simulation game released for the Super Famicom in Japan
- Operation Barbarossa – The Struggle for Russia, a PC game

=== Other arts and entertainment ===
- Barbarossa (film), an Italian film starring Rutger Hauer
- The Barbaroosa, a fictional pirate ship in the Miniskirt Pirates light novel series by Yūichi Sasamoto and corresponding anime Bodacious Space Pirates
- Barbaroslar, a Turkish TV series also known as Barbarossa

== People ==
- Oruç Reis (c. 1474–1518), called Barbarossa or Aruj, Ottoman Turkish captain and Bey of Algiers
- Friedrich III (1831–1888), refers as "Barbarossa of German liberalism" in literary-political epithet
- Theodore Cotillo Barbarossa (1906–1992), American sculptor
- Luca Barbarossa (born 1961), Italian singer-songwriter
- David Barbarossa (born 1961), British drummer
- Sergio Barbarossa, Italian engineer
- Barbarossa (musician) or James Mathé, a British musician who performs under the alias Barbarossa

== Ships ==
- Barbarossa class ocean liner, a class of ten German ocean liners built between 1896 and 1902
  - SS Barbarossa, seized by the US during World War I and renamed USS Mercury (ID-3012)
- SMS Kaiser Barbarossa, a German pre-dreadnought battleship launched in 1900
- Barbaros Hayreddin, an Ottoman battleship of World War I
- RV Barbaros Hayreddin Paşa, a Turkish seismographic research/survey vessel owned and operated by the Turkish Petroleum Corporation

== Other uses ==
- Barbarossa (grape), name of several Italian wine grapes
- Barbaroux, a French wine grape that is sometimes known as Barbarossa
- 1860 Barbarossa (1973 SK), a main-belt asteroid

== See also ==
- Barbarossa city, a nickname for five German cities that Emperor Barbarossa stayed in or near for some time
- Barbarosa, a 1982 American film starring Willie Nelson and Gary Busey
- Barbarosa, Texas, a community in the US
- Barbossa (disambiguation)
