= Sorita =

Sorita may refer to:

- A feminine given name of African origin
- An alternative name for Barbaroux grapes
- The name for Zorita del Maestrazgo in Valencian
