= Barbosa =

Barbosa or Barbossa may refer to:

== People ==
- Barbosa (surname)
- Wesley So's maternal family name under Philippine name conventions is "Barbossa", i.e. "Barbossa" is the maiden name of So's biological mother.

== Places ==
- Barbosa, Antioquia, Colombian municipality
- Barbosa, Santander, Colombian municipality
- Barbosa, São Paulo, Brazilian municipality
- Carlos Barbosa, Brazilian city

== Fiction ==
- Hector Barbossa, from the Pirates of the Caribbean franchise

== Biology ==
- Barbosa, a plant genus, synonym of Syagrus (plant)

== See also ==
- Barboza
- Barbarossa (disambiguation)
