= Lawndale Art Center =

Non-profit space for the exhibition of contemporary works of art

Coordinates: 29°43′48″N 95°23′12″W

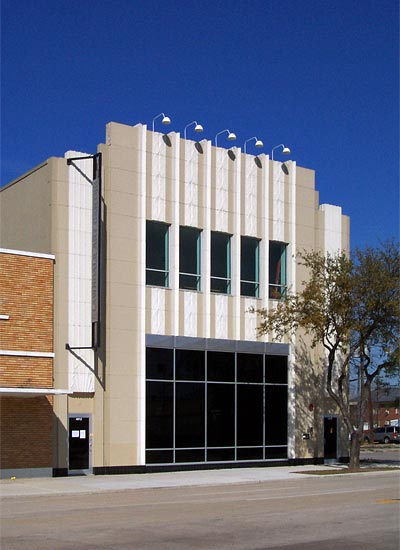
- Lawndale Art Center facade
- Founder: James Surls
- Established: 1979
- Focus: Contemporary art works (all media) by local artists
- Address: 4912 Main Street
- Location: Houston, Texas
- Website: lawndaleartcenter.org

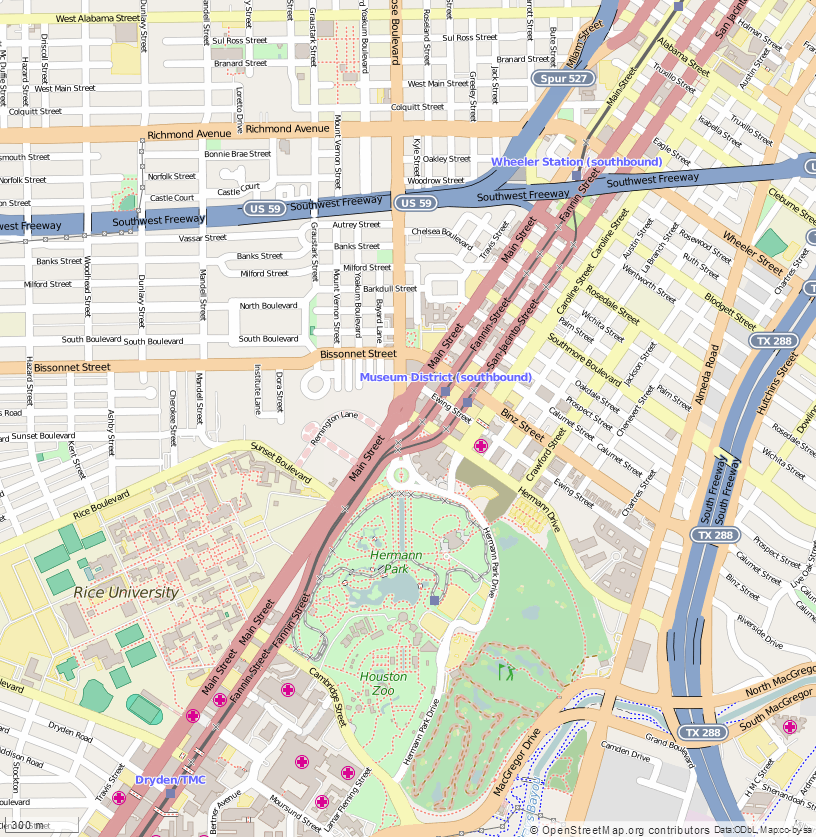
Location within Houston Museum District

Lawndale Art Center is a non-profit space for the exhibition of contemporary works of art in all media, based in Houston, Texas, USA, focused on exhibiting work by Houston area artists.

Lawndale Art Center was founded in 1979 by artist James Surls in an abandoned 100,000-square-foot (9,300 m^{2}) warehouse as part of the University of Houston, providing studio spaces for graduate students in painting and sculpture. Surls, then Professor of Art, created an exhibition area within Lawndale's 15,000 square feet (1,400 m^{2}) of space; the exhibitions there soon expanded to include shows by other artists of the community.

Lawndale Art Center became independent with non-profit status in 1989, and since 1992 has been located in a 1930s Art Deco building designed by Joseph Finger within Houston’s Museum District. The galleries exhibit close to 500 artists annually in changing exhibitions.

Over twenty exhibitions, informal talks and special events are offered yearly including annual events such as Dia de los Muertos/Day of the Dead, Design Fair, and The Big Show.

Lawndale is governed by a board of directors representing the community. At least one-third are artists. Exhibitions, special events and benefits are carried out with the assistance of volunteers, interns and in-kind contributors.

In September 2021, the institute announced its newly appointed Executive Director, Anna Walker.

== Lawndale Artist Studio Program ==
The Lawndale Artist Studio Program is a nine-month residency program where artists receive studio space, a monthly stipend, and a materials allowance. Artists create new work for a spring exhibition.

Past Participants:

- Tay Butler (2023-2024)
- Ayanna Jolivet Mccloud (2023-2024)
- Sol Diaz (2023-2024)
- Alexis Pye (2022-2023)
- Chelsea Clarke (2022-2023)
- Verónica Gaona (2022-2023)
- Loc Huynh (2021-2022)
- Ryan Crowley (2021-2022)
- Jamire Williams (2021-2022)
- Jacquelyne Boe and David Janesko (2019-2021)
- Gerardo Rosales (2019-2021)
- Holly Veselka (2019-2021)
- Robert Hodge (2018-2019)
- Julia Barbosa Landois (2018-2019)
- John Pluecker (2018-2019)
- Regina Agu (2017-2018)
- Shannon Crider (2017-2018)
- htx people project (2017-2018)
- Sarah Welch (2016-2017)
- Randi Long (2016-2017)
- Melinda Laszcyznski (2016-2017)
- Anthony Sonnenberg (2015-2016)
- Cobra McVey (2015-2016)
- Bradley Brown (2015-2016)
- Lina Dib (2014-2015)
- JooYoung Choi (2014-2015)
- Josh Bernstein (2014-2015)
- Emily Peacock (2013-2014)
- Jim Nolan (2013-2014)
- Shayne Murphy (2013-2014)
- Patrick Turk (2012-2013)
- Nancy Douthey (2012-2013)
- DOMOKS / FUTURE BLONDES 0.0.0.0. (2012-2013)
- Anne J. Regan (2011-2012)
- David Politzer (2011-2012)
- Seth Mittag (2011-2012)
- Anthony Thompson Shumate (2010-2011)
- Daniel McFarlane (2010-2011)
- Hillerbrand + Magsamen (2010-2011)
- David Waddell (2009-2010)
- Nick Meriwether (2009-2010)
- Dawn Black (2009-2010)
- El Franco Lee II (2008-2009)
- Amber Eagle (2008-2009)
- Kevin Curry (2008-2009)
- Teresa O'Connor (2007-2008)
- Lynne McCabe (2007-2008)
- Danny Kerschen (2007-2008)
- Dawolu Jabari Anderson (2007)
- Donna Huanca (2007)
- Stephanie Saint Sanchez (2007)
