= Trenton Doyle Hancock =

American artist

- Born: 1974 (age 51–52); Oklahoma City, Oklahoma
- Education: Texas A&M University-Commerce, Temple University
- Spouse: JooYoung Choi
- Website: https://www.mindofthemound.com/

Trenton Doyle Hancock (born 1974) is an American artist working with prints, drawings, and collaged-felt paintings. Through his work, Hancock mainly aims to tell the story of the Mounds, mystical creatures that are part of the artist's world. In this sense, each new artwork is the artist's contribution to the development of Mounds.

== Early life and education ==
Hancock was born in 1974 in Oklahoma City, Oklahoma, and grew up in Paris, Texas. He received a BFA from Texas A&M University–Commerce. As an undergrad, Doyle worked as a cartoonist for the school newspaper. At the time, he thought he would become a professional cartoonist following graduation. The influence of Hancock's early interest in cartoons is still visible in his current work. Following his studies at Texas A&M University-Commerce, Hancock earned an MFA from the Tyler School of Art at Temple University, Philadelphia. Hancock's art was also significantly influenced by his upbringing in Paris, Texas. Church was a fundamental focal point of his childhood, as his stepfather was a minister. Thus, religious tropes and themes are abundant in his works, such as recurring references to Redemption and the Eucharist.

== Work ==
Esther, Graphite and acrylic on paper, 11 1/4 x 10 3/4 inches

Hancock makes prints, videos, drawings, sculptures, individual performances, and collaged felt paintings. His influences include comics, graphic novels, cartoons, music, and film.

Hancock is known for his visual work that focuses on the Mounds and the Vegans, two forces that are constantly dueling with one another and serve as a representation of the eternal battle between good and evil. This extended series also serves to explore Hancock's mythology of the two forces, which gives him the opportunity to develop his concepts at length. He has structured this world to be one he can both occupy and continuously rework, depicting the life stages of a variety of characters, such as the Mounds: ancient half-human and half-plant creatures which were created thousands of years ago when a human male ejaculated into a field of flowers. The Vegans are malevolent beings who seek to destroy all Mounds, especially "The Legend": the original Mound, and the most despised among Vegans. The Vegans are meant to symbolize those who are determined to force their beliefs on others, whereas the Mounds symbolize the Earth, acceptance, love, and progressive behaviors. Other key characters in Hancock's works are Painter, a maternal spirit who governs color, Loid, a paternal energy focused on words, and Torpedo Boy, an unheroic super hero alter ego that Hancock created as a child. Torpedo Boy has superhuman strength, but his human emotions—especially his pride—prevent him from performing his heroic duties to their fullest extent. Additional characters that appear in the work alongside him include Junior Mound, Bringback, Baby Curt, and Shy Jerry.

Hancock is known for taking risks in his art, and has stated that he is typically the most interested in his art when he feels he has done something daring with it: whether it deals with social issues, universal dilemmas, or personal matters. Regarding whether Torpedo Boy and the Vegans are meant to symbolize good and evil in his works, Hancock states: "Hopefully there's a range of what the Vegans are, and what Torpedo Boy is. You can choose to identify with that range or not. I came from a household where there were very strict ideas about what good and evil are. When I left home, I realized that didn't really work for me, that life was a huge grey area. That became more interesting."

In 2013 his work was translated to Cult of Color: Call to Color, a ballet created in collaboration with Ballet Austin's Artistic Director Stephen Mills.

== Awards and fellowships ==
Among the honors that Hancock has earned are an Artadia Award (2003), The Greenfield Prize at the Hermitage Artist Retreat (2013), a two-year residency and commission of original work, Art League Houston's Texas Artist of the Year (2017), and Texas Medal of Arts Awards in Visual Arts (2019). Hancock was also one of the youngest artists to be featured in the Whitney Biennial, being selected for two consecutive exhibitions in 2000 and 2002. He was a Core Artist in Residence at the Museum of Fine Arts, Houston in 2002.

== Exhibitions and publications ==
- Fruitmarket Gallery, Edinburgh, Scotland "The Wayward Thinker" (2007)
- Museum Boijmans Van Beuningen, Rotterdam, The Netherlands "The Wayward Thinker" (2007)
- Arthouse at The Jones Center, Austin, USA "Sirens’ Song" (2007)
- Clementine Gallery, New York, USA "The Lizard Cult" (2007)
- Museum of Modern Art, New York, USA "The Compulsive Line: Etching 1900 to Now" (2006)
- Zachęta National Gallery of Art, Warsaw, Poland "Black Alphabet" (2006)
- Villa Manin Centre for Contemporary Art, Infinite Painting: Contemporary Paintings and Global Realism "Passariano, Italy" (2006)
- Virginia Museum of Contemporary Art, Virginia, USA "Skin & Bones, 20 Years of Drawing" (2015)
- James Cohan Gallery, Stockholm, Sweden "Powerful Babies: Keith Haring’s Impact on Artists Today" (2015)
- Contemporary Arts Museum Houston, Texas, USA "Skin and Bones, 20 Years of Drawing" (2014)
- MoCA Cleveland, Cleveland, Ohio "DIRGE: Reflections on [Life and] Death" (2014)
- John and Mable Ringling Museum of Art, Florida, USA, Trenton Doyle Hancock, "EMIT: What the Bringback Brought" (2015)
- Contemporary Art Museum St. Louis, St. Louis, MO "The Re-Evolving Door to the Moundverse (2018)
- Temple Contemporary, Philadelphia, PA "From a Black Son to a White Man to a Black Woman and Back Again" (2018)
- Phillips New York, New York City, New York, AMERICAN AFRICAN AMERICAN (2019)
- John Michael Kohler Arts Center, Sheboygan, WI, "Makeshift" (2018-2019)
- The Menil Collection, Houston, Texas, USA "Contemporary Focus: Trenton Doyle Hancock" (2019)
- Mass MoCA, North Adams, Massachusetts, USA “Mind Of The Mound: Critical Mass" (2019)

Hancock was included in the American Folk Art Museum's "Dargerism" exhibit, showing the influence of Henry Darger on contemporary artists.

Hancock served as the lead artist of Bringbacks and the Beguiling Bringbarrow at Meow Wolf's Houston location, Radio Tave, which opened on October 31, 2024.
