= JooYoung Choi =

American sculptor

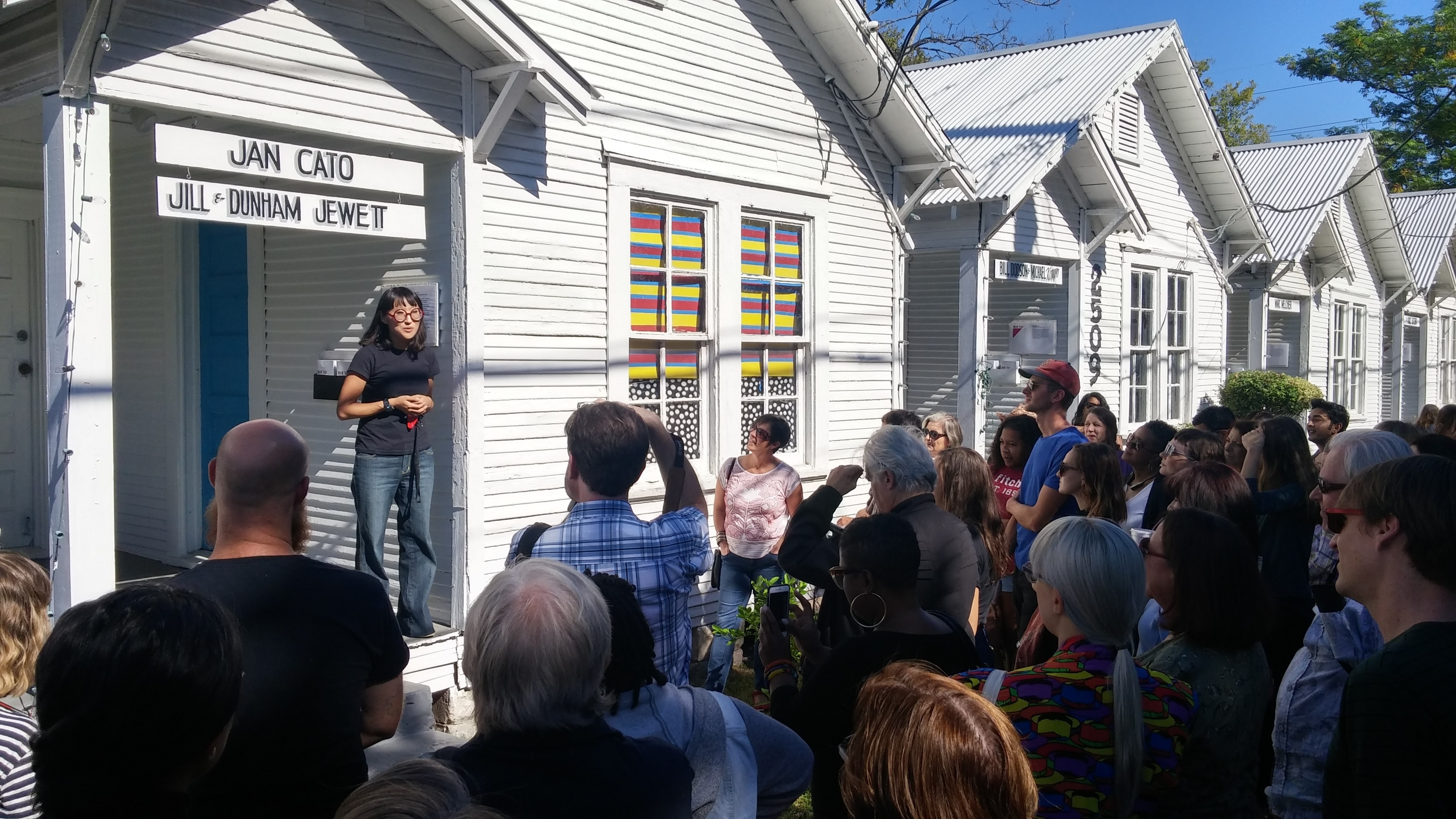
- JooYoung Choi giving an artist talk at Project Row Houses in Houston in 2016
- Born: 1982 (age 43–44); Seoul, South Korea
- Education: Art Institute of Boston Massachusetts College of Art and Design
- Known for: The Cosmic Womb
- Spouse: Trenton Doyle Hancock
- Website: jooyoungchoi.com

JooYoung Choi is a Houston-based Korean American multidisciplinary visual artist working with paintings, sculpture, and video to portray the mythology of a fictional world called the Cosmic Womb.

== Personal life ==
Choi was born in Seoul, South Korea in 1982, immigrating to Concord, New Hampshire through adoption in the early 1980s. She earned her undergraduate degree from the Massachusetts College of Art and Design and her M.F.A. in Visual Art from the Art Institute of Boston.

== Work ==
Choi's work includes soft sculptures, puppets, paintings, animation, and video art. Her first puppets were created in 2015 during a residency at Lawndale Art Center, while also working to develop her skills as a painter and finding a love for visually balanced dynamic compositions. In 2017 Choi was part of a three person exhibition titled "A Better Yesterday" at the Contemporary Arts Museum Houston. Her sculpture in the exhibition, "Time for You and Joy to Get Acquainted," was later acquired by The Crystal Bridges Museum of American Art. She has two works of art in the permanent collection of the Museum of Fine Arts, Houston. In 2020 she premiered a new video, "Spectra Force Vive: Infinite Pie Delivery Service" at Aurora Picture Show in Houston.

=== Cosmic Womb ===
The Cosmic Womb is a paracosm with its own characters and mythology, with the motto "Have Faith, for You've Always Been Loved." It is a way of exploring aspects of her own identity and her experiences with adoption, offering ways for Choi to step into the roles of different characters. Choi sometimes appears as the character C.S. Watson whose biography parallels the artists. The Cosmic Womb is governed by an earthling from Concord (the city of her childhood) named C.S. Watson, alongside the Tuplets, who are six humanoids with special powers, and Queen Kiok.

== Selected awards ==
- National Endowment for the Arts, Challenge America grant recipient, 2019
- The Idea Fund, Round Eleven Stimulus grant, 2019
- Mayor’s Office of Cultural Affairs and Houston Arts Alliance, Support for Artist and Creative Individuals grant, 2019
- Riverfest Artist-in-Residence, 2018
- The Idea Fund, Round Eight Spark grant, 2016
- Artadia Fund for Art and Dialogue, Artadia Award, 2015
