= Mário Barbosa =

Brazilian painter (1880–1917)

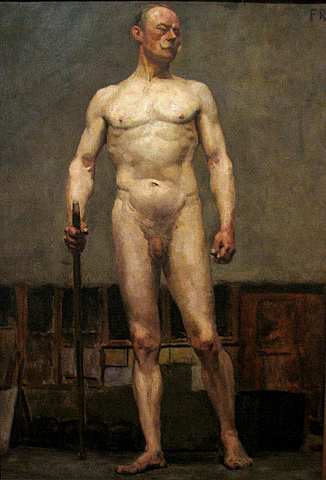
Estudo de Academia (Academy Study)

Mário Villares Barbosa (1880, Campinas – 24 October 1917, Madrid) was a Brazilian painter, who played a significant role in the development of modernism in Brazilian painting. His works are notable for their vibrant colors, use of light, and blending of different styles and techniques of painting. Despite his short career, Barbosa left an indelible mark on Brazil's cultural heritage through his paintings, many of which can be found in museums and galleries around the world.

== Biography ==
Mário Villares Barbosa was a born in Campinas, São Paulo in 1880. He grew up in a family of artists and was interested in art from an early age. He was the twin brother of Dario Villares Barbosa, who was also a painter. Barbosa studied under the renowned Brazilian painter Oscar Pereira da Silva, whose works are also part of the Pinacoteca's collection.

Barbosa's art career was relatively short, as he died at the young age of 37 on 24 October 1917 in Madrid.

== Artistic style and legacy ==
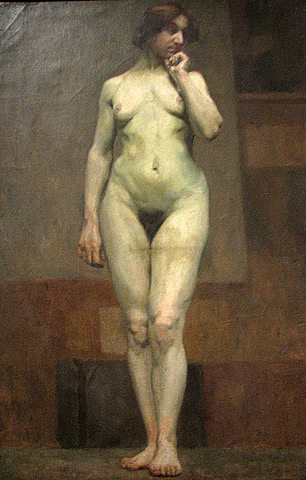
Estudo de Academia (Academy Study)

During his short time, Barbosa created several stunning works that have become an important part of Brazil's art heritage. He was one of the pioneers of modernism in Brazilian painting, along with his twin brother Dario Villares Barbosa. The works of Barbosa are notable for their vibrant colours, use of light, and the blending of various techniques and styles of painting. Barbosa was known for his paintings of figures, portraits, and landscapes. He was also recognized for his academic studies of human anatomy. Barbosa's artwork has been featured in various museums and galleries worldwide. He was particularly popular in his home country of Brazil, where his work has been shown in exhibitions such as the Brazilian Art Week in 2019.

The artist's approach to painting was heavily influenced by the Impressionist movement, and he incorporated this influence into his work to create a unique and modern style of painting that was ahead of his time. One of Barbosa's most famous paintings is "Boiada," which he created in 1902. This painting depicts a herd of cattle being driven along a dusty road in Brazil, and it showcases Barbosa's excellent use of light and color to bring out the vibrancy and liveliness of the scene. Anthor one of Barbosa's famous works is "Estudo de Academia" ("Academy Study"). This painting is an academic study of a male and female figures with a serene expression, and it showcases Barbosa's skill in depicting human anatomy. Another well-known piece by Barbosa is "Retrato de Mulher" ("Portrait of a Woman").
