= A Scanner Darkly (soundtrack) =

A Scanner Darkly (Original Motion Picture Soundtrack)

Soundtrack album by Graham Reynolds
- Released: June 27, 2006
- Recorded: 2005–2006
- Studio: Red House Studio, Austin, Texas
- Genre: Film soundtrack
- Length: 51:10
- Label: Lakeshore
- Producer: Graham Reynolds

Graham Reynolds chronology
A Scanner Darkly (2006)	I'll Come Running (2008)

A Scanner Darkly (Original Motion Picture Soundtrack) is the soundtrack album to the 2006 adult animated science fiction thriller film A Scanner Darkly directed by Richard Linklater and featured performances from Keanu Reeves, Robert Downey Jr., Woody Harrelson, and Winona Ryder. The film score is written by Texas–based musician Graham Reynolds in his maiden collaboration with Linklater and would later continue to associate with the director on several of his projects since then.

The score was a by-product of the film's prolonged production, where the composition and recording process took more than a year, and over one-and-a-half-an-hour of music was written specifically for the film. It uses acoustic instrumentation, except for electric guitars and bass, and were modified throughout sound effects. Over 44 minutes of music featured in the film, while the shorter cues were expanded for the CD release and additionally included two remixes, totaling up to 51 minutes in length. The soundtrack was released through Lakeshore Records on June 27, 2006.

== Development and production ==
The film score for A Scanner Darkly was written and composed by Texas–based musician Graham Reynolds. Linklater approached Reynolds in 2003 after a club performance and suggested him to create the film score. Eventually, they worked on the short film Live from Shiva's Dance Floor, a 20-minute short featuring Timothy "Speed" Levitch, which released the same year.

Unlike the usual time allotment for scoring Hollywood films, the composition and recording process for A Scanner Darkly took over one-and-a-half years due to the time-consuming animation process. Reynolds considered it as a luxury as instead of making the final draft, "this was an experiment-with-different-sounds kind of process; make a bunch of rough drafts, see what we think, what we like and don't like, keep what we like and then move on to try different things for the other scenes." Some of the drafts were created during the recording and some were added in the final mix. The score was recorded at his east Austin home, in his bedroom, where he would discuss the scoring process with Linklater, the sound supervisor, music editor and executives from the production house.

While Reynolds worked solely, he was also assisted by close-knit network of musically inclined friends in the form of Golden Arm Trio. For some of the early drafts, he would record piano along to the themes to see their attempts, both in structure and tempo, and would use other instruments if the crew liked it. At other instances, he would do a full draft and have players come in and play other instruments or have strings in-between. Somewhere in the middle of the process, they would have a string quartet come in and play the score, and if the crew liked it, they would later it with more strings on it so it would become bigger and fully executed. Reynolds noted that the score was initially sketched with heavy saxophones, but throughout their drafting, the use of acoustic instruments came into the process, except for electric guitar and bass; most of the instruments were transformed through effects though Reynolds did not use synthesizers.

Reynolds was concerned with the texture of the film, where the score conglomerates disparate sounds ranging from extreme musical genres and traditional vintage Hollywood sounds. These elements work in tandem with the chaotic nature of their characters and their warped sensibilities twisting the perceptions of reality. Reynolds noted that the overall score is "the tied-together, cohesive, make-it-more-similar version" and its prolonged production of the score resulted in the variation of styles. While in production, the score lacked cohesion both thematically, aesthetically and sonically, which he considered an issue, referencing "Strawberry Pie" and "Do You Like Cats" having the same melody and sounded similar to other cues, resulted in a thematic and melodic connection with the music. The themes have numerous layers where Reynolds tried to use similar vocabularies in different contexts and styles. All of these elements tied with the two subtexts: drug addiction and the emotions and tragedy surrounding it. These effects were utilized in order to connect with the characters and the events happening in the film.

The film also includes clips of four Radiohead songs—"Fog", "Skttrbrain (Four Tet Mix)", "The Amazing Sounds of Orgy", "Pulk/Pull Revolving Doors" (although it appears uncredited)—and one Thom Yorke solo song, "Black Swan". An early test screening featured an all-Radiohead soundtrack. The members of the band had watched the screening and was interested in being involved in some way. The music supervisor also used some of their songs as temp tracks and it worked really well. Reynolds noted that their songs blend together into the score, which was not "a startling aesthetic shift" and liked the idea of their songs mixed there, though aesthetically making them work was a challenge. He referenced Ennio Morricone, John Zorn and several other composers as inspiration for the score.

Reynolds had recorded more than an hour of the film's music. After completing the score, he set to work on remixing the surround sound music into stereo. He selected 44 minutes out of the film score to compile it into a CD while attempting to retain the film's arc, and some of the shorter cues were assembled into longer CD tracks. The score album was released through Lakeshore Records on June 27, 2006, featuring Reynolds' score and exclusive remixes of his music by DJ Spooky and Jack Dangers (Meat Beat Manifesto).

== Track listing ==
No.	Title	Length
1.	"7 Years from Now"	1:08
2.	"Aphids"	2:55
3.	"Swallowed Up in Victory"	0:51
4.	"Strawberry Pie"	4:04
5.	"The Dark World Where I Dwell"	2:15
6.	"Sex, Beer and Pills"	1:53
7.	"A Farm Near the Mountain"	1:37
8.	"Bug-Bite Squared"	2:28
9.	"Pose as a Nark"	2:34
10.	"Do You Like Cats?"	2:04
11.	"A Scanner Darkly"	2:50
12.	"Abrasocaine"	0:43
13.	"Part of the Plan"	1:07
14.	"Are You Experiencing Technical Difficulties?"	2:16
15.	"Your Move, Peterbilt"	1:25
16.	"Room 203"	2:04
17.	"Escorted to the Bright Lights"	2:56
18.	"You'll See the Way You Saw Before"	2:57
19.	"A New Path"	1:51
20.	"Little Blue Flowers"	3:05
21.	"Darkly Mix" (Jack Dangers)	3:39
22.	"Call Sign/Aleph:/" (DJ Spooky)	4:28
Total length:		51:10

== Reception ==
Heather Phares of AllMusic wrote "Hallucinatory and evocative, A Scanner Darkly is the musical embodiment of a bad trip—but that's a compliment." Andrew Grenade of Soundtrack.Net wrote "overall, this score is a series of quick cuts from style to style. It jives perfectly with the film, but not sustained listening." Manohla Dargis of The New York Times found the score to be "hallucinating". Justin Chang of Variety wrote "Graham Reynolds’ music is eerily evocative without quickening the pulse."

== Personnel credits ==
Credits adapted from liner notes:

- Music composer and producer – Graham Reynolds
- Recording – Graham Reynolds, Buzz Moran
- Mixing – Graham Reynolds, Buzz Moran, Peter Stopschinski
- Mastering – Dave Donnelly
- Music supervisor – Nic Ratner
- Executive producers – Richard Linklater, Brian McNelis, Skip Williamson
- Copyist – Peter Stopschinski
- Art direction – Stephanie Mente
- Layout – Joe Chavez
- Music business affairs – Dirk Hebert, Keith Zajic
- Executive in charge of music – Doug Frank, Suzi Civita
- A&R – Eric Craig

Instruments

- Baritone saxophone – Paul Klemperer
- Bass clarinet – Eric Hargett
- Cello – Charles Prewitt, Jonathan Dexter, Valerie Klatt
- Double bass – Erik Grostic, Jessica Gilliam-Valls, P. Kellach Waddle
- Guitar – Justin Hennard, Buzz Moran, Graham Reynolds
- Oboe – Leigh Ann Woodard
- Pedal Steel guitar – Ricky Davis
- Percussions – Buzz Moran, Graham Reynolds
- Piano, drums, vibraphone, bass, harmonium, yunluo – Graham Reynolds
- Saw – Jeff Johnston
- Tenor saxophone – Thad Scott
- Viola – Ames Asbell, Jason Elinoff
- Violin – Bruce Colson, Joseph Shuffield
