= Stanley Hall (dancer) =

British-born ballet dancer

- Born: Stanley Hall; 16 June 1917; Birmingham, England
- Died: 27 June 1994 (aged 77); Austin, Texas, U.S.
- Resting place: Austin Memorial Park Cemetery
- Occupation(s): Dancer, dance teacher, choreographer
- Honours: Austin Hall of Fame

Stanley Hall (16 June 1917 – 27 June 1994) was a British-born ballet dancer with an eclectic career that ranged from the Vic-Wells Ballet (later the Royal Ballet) to the Ballets de Paris, from major Hollywood movies to Broadway, and from TV specials to celebrity nightclub acts. Hall moved to Austin, Texas in the late 1960s and founded Austin Ballet Theatre, a ballet company that enjoyed great popularity for its monthly performances at the Armadillo World Headquarters from 1972 to 1980. In addition to his performance legacy, he was also a teacher and mentor to many aspiring dancers in Austin until his death in 1994.

== Biography ==
=== Early life ===
Hall was born on 21 June 1917 to Sarah (née. Lang/Long) Hall and John Hall at Birmingham, England. He began studies with the Vic-Wells Ballet in London at the age of 12.

=== Career ===
He joined the Vic-Wells Ballet company as a soloist at the age of fifteen. (The Vic-Wells was the predecessor to the Sadler's Wells Ballet, which in turn became the Royal Ballet.) Hall danced under the direction of Ninette de Valois and was in the original casts of some of the early choreographies of Frederick Ashton. According to photographic evidence and oral testimony, at some point Hall also danced with the Birmingham Ballet, but the dates are unclear.

His career at the Ballet was interrupted by World War II, and he became a signalman for the Royal Navy, serving on HMS London for three to four years. After the war, he moved to France and danced for Roland Petit's Les Ballets de Paris. Petit's ballet Carmen was a popular hit that toured the United States, but the company became stranded in Seattle after the American presenter backed out from the production. Howard Hughes took an interest in the company and offered to the dancers the opportunity to travel to Hollywood for a film version of Carmen. The movie was never completed, but Hall stayed on to dance in many well-known Hollywood musical films, including the “Diamonds are a Girl’s Best Friend” segment from Gentlemen Prefer Blondes. Hall enjoyed a successful career as a dancer in Hollywood movies, Broadway musicals, television specials, and live touring shows with Betty Grable, Jane Russell, and Liberace. While in California, Hall broadened his dance skills with studies in modern dance with Bella Lewitsky and jazz with Jack Cole. He also worked with a small ballet company in Long Beach, California, where he began directing and choreographing.

Hall's friends, the ballerina sisters Patricia Wilde and Nora White Shattuck, recruited Hall to assume Shattuck's position teaching and directing ballet for an amateur company in Austin, Texas during the late 1960s. After moving to Austin, Hall also began teaching ballet at the University of Texas at Austin as part of the required physical education program at the time. After a falling out with the Austin Civic Ballet (later Ballet Austin) board of directors, Hall formed his own company, Austin Ballet Theatre, in 1972.

Due to a lack of performance venues at the time, Austin Ballet Theatre began performing at the Armadillo World Headquarters shortly after its formation. The Armadillo was a space becoming known for its progressive, country, or “cosmic cowboy,” music that would generate into Austin's booming music industry and become the inspiration for the PBS TV show Austin City Limits. Described as a "psychedelic rock barn," the Armadillo was also known for its hippie clientele. The Austin Ballet Theatre performed at the Armadillo roughly one Sunday a month from 1972 to 1980 to crowds of 1200–1500. The phenomenon spawned several articles such as "Ballet and Beer" by Suzanne Shelton in Texas Monthly. Austin Ballet Theatre lasted after the Armadillo's closing in 1980 until 1986. Hall continued to teach in Austin until his death.

=== Death ===
Hall died in 1994.

== Works ==
=== Film ===
- Hans Christian Andersen
- Road to Bali
- There’s No Business Like Show Business
- Gentlemen Prefer Blondes
- Carousel
- Oklahoma
- The Glass Slipper
- The Opposite Sex.

=== Broadway ===
- Fanny
- Kiss Me, Kate
- Finian’s Rainbow
- Grand Hotel
- Song of Norway
