= César Barbosa =

Colombian botanist

César Barbosa (born 1954) is a Colombian biologist, ornithologist and botanist, specialising in the study of Fabaceae, a large and agriculturally important family of flowering plants that includes legumes and beans.

In 1976 received his BA in Biology from the National University of Colombia.

He is a researcher at the Herbarium of the National Institute of Renewable Natural Resources and Environment (Colombia) (INDERENA), specialising in legumes and has made botanical expeditions within Colombia. His published work describes Indigofera species occurring in Colombia, including Indigofera hirsuta, Indigofera lespedezioides and Indigofera suffruticosa. In August 2008 he described and named 41 new Trianea species.

The standard author abbreviation C.Barbosa is used to indicate this person as the author when citing a botanical name. The International Plant Names Index (IPNI) lists 18 species under his name.
