= Dário Villares Barbosa =

Brazilian painter (1880–1952)

Dário Barbosa
- Born: Dário Villares Barbosa; 1880; Campinas, Brazil
- Died: 1952 (aged 71–72); Paris, France
- Known for: Painting
- Notable work: Moorish Woman; Spanish Woman; Study of Female Nude
- Movement: Modernism
- Relatives: Mário Barbosa (brother)

Dário Villares Barbosa (1880, Campinas – 1952, Paris) was a Brazilian painter. He is known for his paintings that depict the people and landscapes of Spain and North Africa, which he encountered during his travels. Barbosa's works are distinguished from other painters of his time because they already showed traces of modernity. His style of painting was marked by bold colors and strong brushwork, which gave his works a sense of liveliness and vitality. Barbosa's works are held in various collections worldwide, and he is considered one of the most significant Brazilian painters of the early 20th century.

== Biography ==
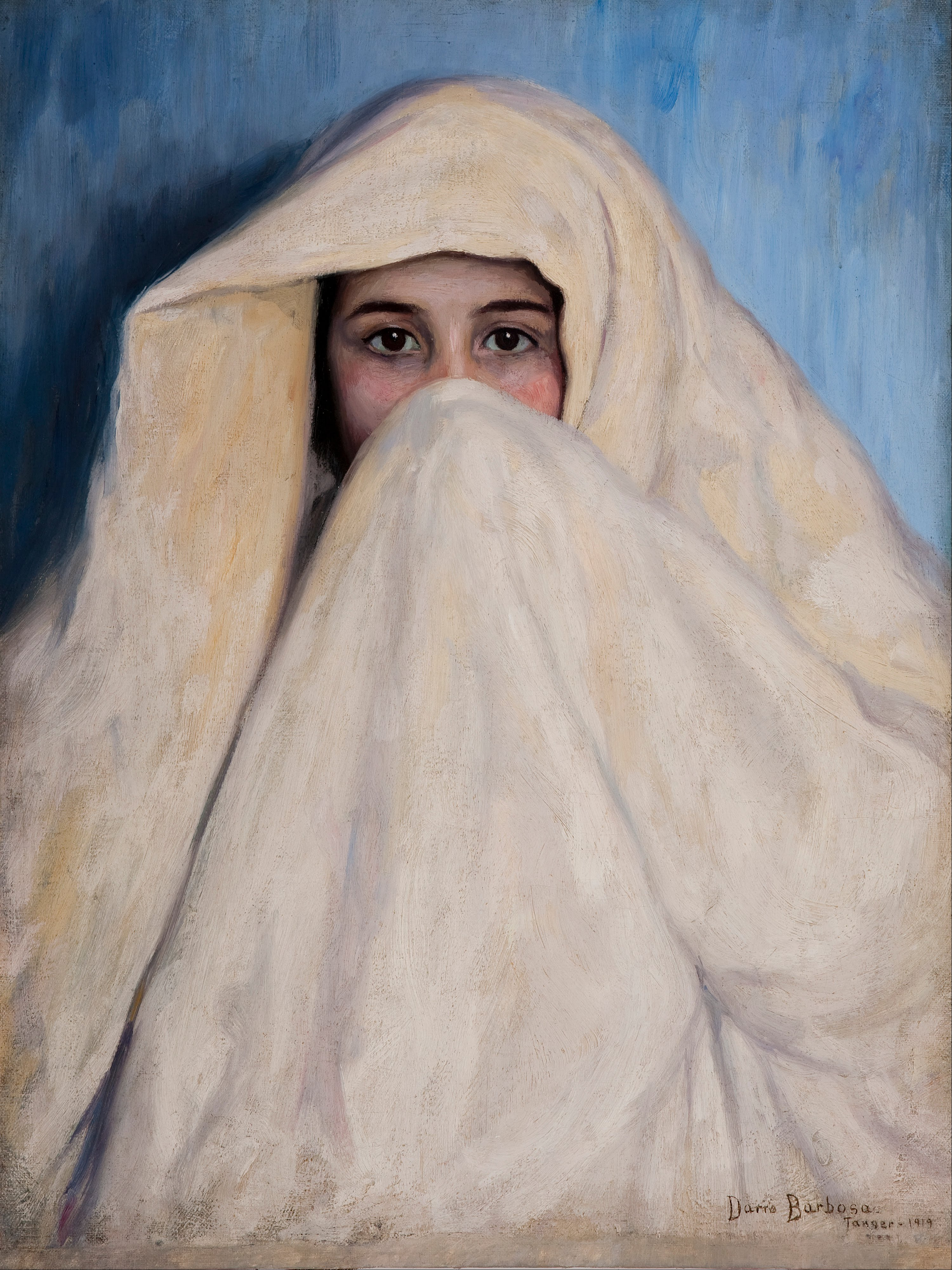
A moura, 1919

Dario Villares Barbosa was born in Campinas, São Paulo in 1880 and died in Paris, in 1952. He grew up in a family of artists and was interested in art from an early age. He was the twin brother of Mário Barbosa, who was also a painter. Barbosa was a pupil of the painter Oscar Pereira da Silva while in Brazil. He studied with Silva for a few years but was eager to expand his artistic knowledge and decided to travel to Paris to further his studies.

In Paris, Barbosa received a scholarship from the government of São Paulo, which allowed him to stay in the city and study art. He was exposed to new ideas and techniques and was greatly influenced by the modernist movement that was taking place in Europe at the time. He was particularly interested in the works of artists such as Henri Matisse and Pablo Picasso. After returning to Brazil, Barbosa continued to develop his artistic style and became an important figure in the Brazilian art scene.

Barbosa died in Paris, in 1952.

== Artistic style ==
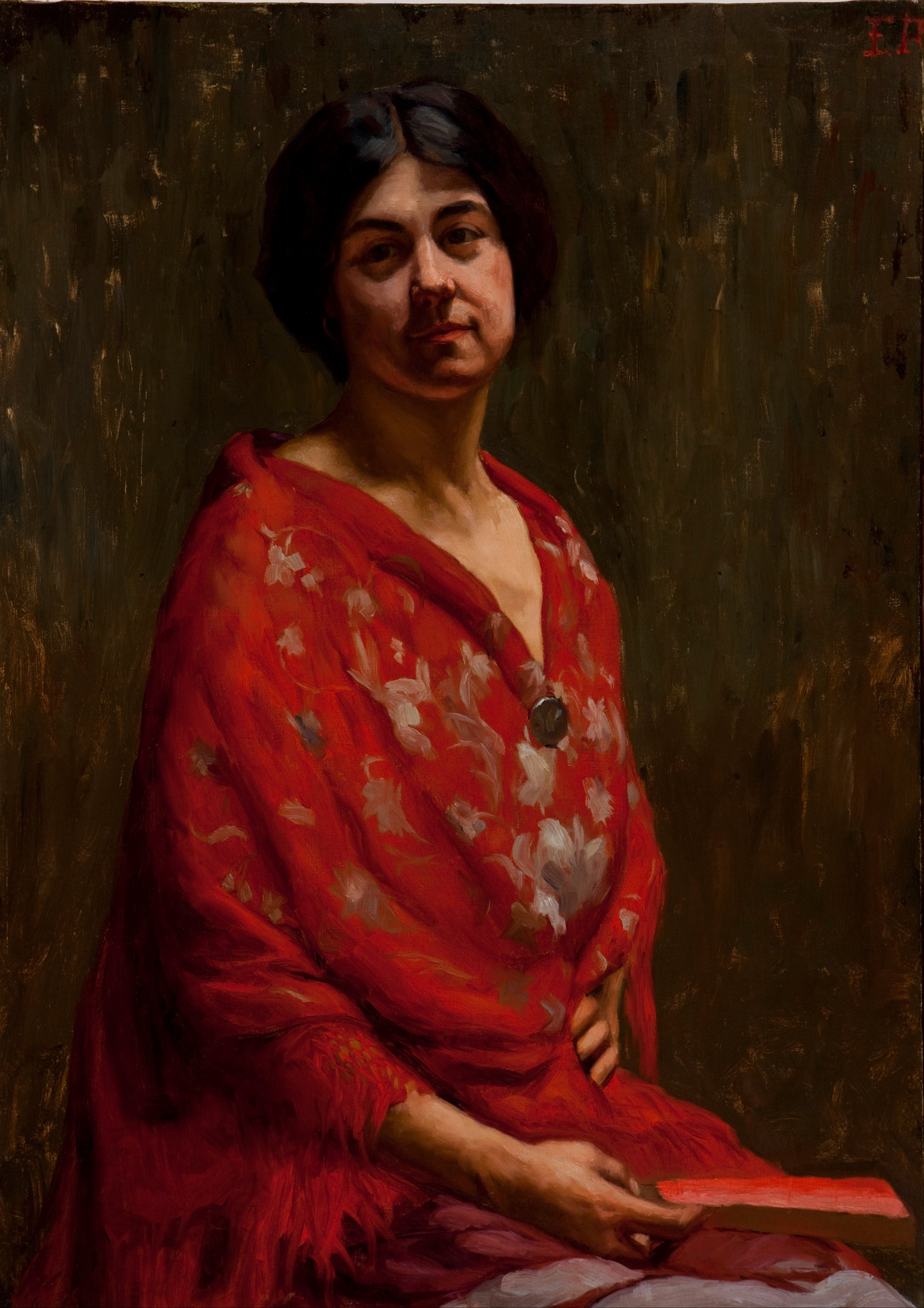
Espanhola, 1900

During his time in Paris, Barbosa produced some of his most important works. His paintings were characterised by their bright colours and bold brushstrokes, which reflected the influence of the modernist movement. He also experimented with different styles and techniques, and his works ranged from landscapes and portraits to nudes and still lifes.

Barbosa's style reflects a combination of traditional and modern elements. His works are characterised by a focus on the human figure, expressive use of colour, use of light and shadow, and interest in decorative arts. His style evolved throughout his career, reflecting his exposure to different artistic movements and his own personal interests and sensibilities. One of his famous paintings is "A Moura," which he painted in 1919. This painting shows a woman wearing traditional Moorish clothing, and it is an excellent example of Barbosa's ability to capture the beauty and emotion of his subjects.

Throughout his career, Barbosa remained committed to his artistic vision and continued to produce works that were both innovative and expressive. Barbosa's works also show an interest in the decorative arts. He was particularly interested in textile and ceramics design, and his works often feature patterns and motifs inspired by these arts. This interest in decorative arts was not limited to his painting, but also extended to his involvement in the decorative arts movement in Brazil.

== Legacy ==
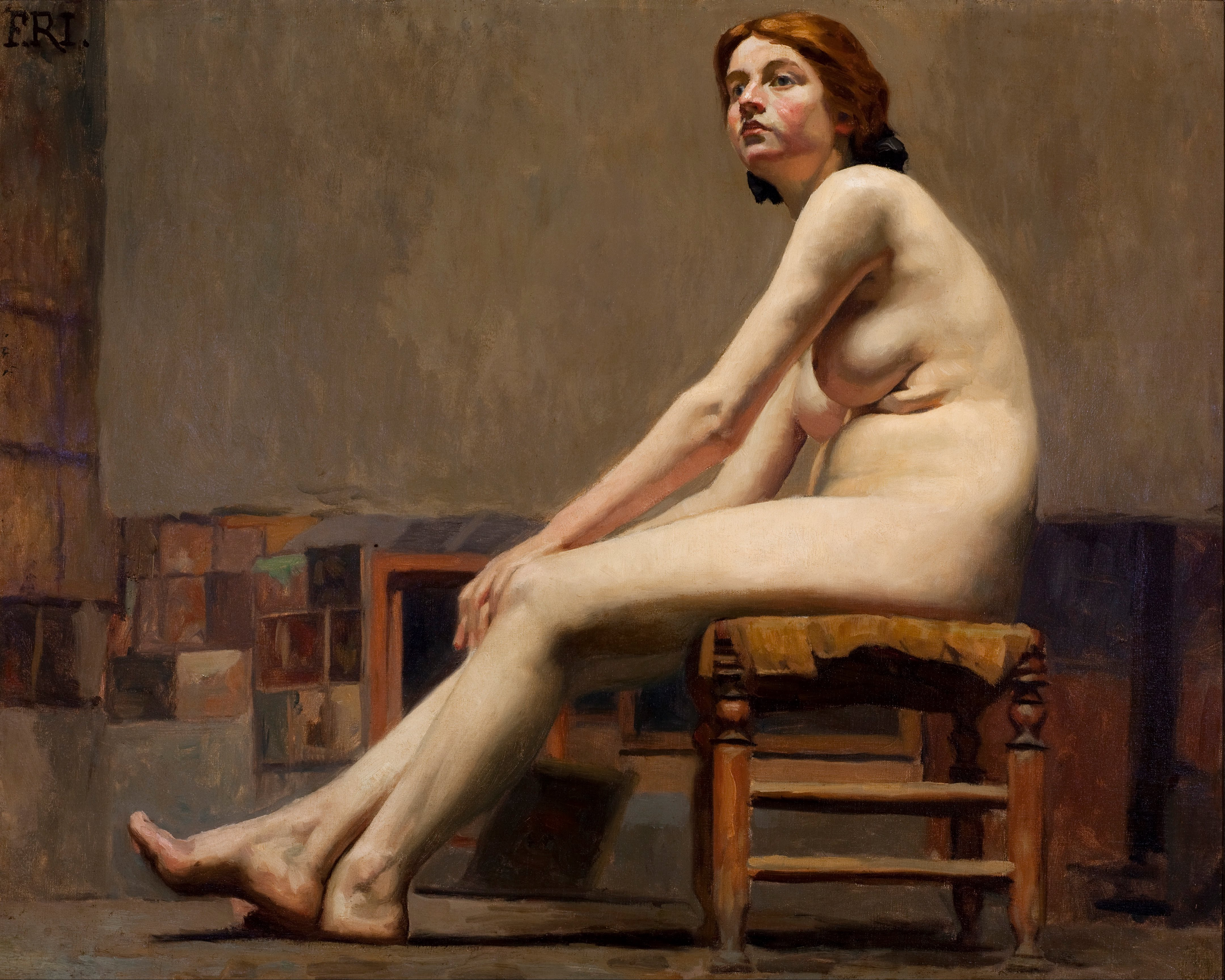
Estudo de nu, c. 1905

Barbosa legacy lives on through his works, which are still celebrated and admired by art lovers around the world. His works were exhibited in several galleries and museums, and he was widely recognised for his contributions to Brazilian modernist art. Barbosa's works can be found in the Pinacoteca do Estado de São Paulo, Sao Paulo, Brazil, and on Google Arts & Culture platform, where content from over 2000 leading museums and archives are featured. His paintings featured on the platform include "A moura," "Espanhola," "Estudo de nu," "Nu (estudo)," and "The City of Granada, Spain". The platform also features "Mulheres Tanger" and "A negra com brûleur incensório" which can be viewed in Augmented Reality.
