= Pedro Barbosa (jurist) =

Portuguese jurist

Pedro Barbosa (1530/35-1606) was a Portuguese jurist and the leading representative of the ius commune and the usus modernus in Portugal.

Teaching law at the University of Coimbra in 1557–64, he came to hold the highest judicial offices, including with the Inquisition, as judge of the Casa da Suplicação and the Desembargo do Paço, and as Chanceler-mor do Reino. Barbosa also wrote numerous tracts on family law, inheritance law and procedural law.
