= Barboza =

Barboza is a surname of Portuguese or Hispanic origin. Notable people with the surname include:

- Agustín Barboza (1913–1998), Paraguayan singer and composer
- Ana Teresa Barboza (born 1981), Peruvian textile artist
- Arnold Barboza Jr. (born 1991), American boxer
- Celia Barboza (born 1977), Uruguayan surfer
- Cynthia Barboza (born 1987), American volleyball player
- Desiree Barboza, Venezuelan politician
- Edson Barboza (born 1986), Brazilian mixed martial arts fighter
- Jessica Barboza (born 1987), Venezuelan beauty queen
- Joseph "The Animal" Barboza (1932–1976), Portuguese-American mobster and hit man
- Nidia Barboza (born 1954), Costa Rican poet and feminist activist
- Omar Barboza (born 1944), Venezuelan politician, opponent of Hugo Chávez

== See also ==
- Barbosa (disambiguation)
