= The Intergalactic Nemesis =

The Intergalactic Nemesis (Book One: Target Earth) is a stage show written and directed by Jason Neulander, based out of Austin, TX. It is billed as a "live-action graphic novel," due to its combination of the visual medium of comic books with elements of radio play and traditional stage performance. During the stage show, panels from the comic series are projected (minus the original dialogue balloons) on a large screen, while three actors perform the voices for all the characters, a Foley artist performs the sound effects, and a pianist performs the soundtrack.

The stage show is adapted from the stage play by Jason Neulander and Chad Nichols, which was adapted from the radio drama by Ray Patrick Colgan, Jessica Reisman, Julia Edwards, and Lisa D’Amour, based originally on an idea by Ray Patrick Colgan. The show ties into a seven-issue comic book series of the same name written by Neulander with art from Tim Doyle. The show has been featured on Late Night with Conan O'Brien, as well as covered on NPR's All Things Considered.

== Synopsis ==
The story is set in 1933. The protagonist Reporter Molly Sloan and her assistant Timmy Mendez are meeting with an informant, Vlad, in the Carpathian Mountains. In the midst of telling Molly about 'terrible monsters' living nearby, Vlad is assassinated and the pair are forced to flee, aided by a glasses-wearing stranger. Their search for answers regarding Vlad's death leads them to Kradmoor, home of a friend of Molly's father, the wealthy Lord Crawford. There they meet Mysterion the Magnificent, a sinister hypnotist with his own agenda, who has already seized control of Kradmoor from Lord Crawford. Molly and Timmy are saved again by Ben Wilcott, the glass-wearing stranger from earlier, and the trio escape on horseback.

Ben claims to know the cause of all the strange happenings, an alien race called 'Zygonians' which fearsome sludge monsters, acidic to the touch and dedicated to wiping out human life. The trio travel to Tunis, to meet with another of Molly's informants, the ambiguous (or morals and intent) Jean-Pierre Desperois. In furthering her investigation of the Zygonians, Molly triggers a chain of events that take her beyond Earth and into the stars, embroiling her in a war between the Zygonians and a planet of robots, and exposing secrets about her companions.

== Cast and Crew ==
Jason Neulander: Director / Writer / Production Designer.

Danu Uribe: Molly Sloan, Bird, Lead Hive Voice, Aughy, Claire, Little Girl, Queen of Zygon

Brock England: Timmy Mendez, Assassin, Jeeves, Shopkeeper, Clint, X-, Silcron, Zygonian guard

Christopher Lee Gibson: Vlad, Ben Wilcott, Driver, Mysterion the Magnificent, Lord Crawford, Thug, Omar, Jean-Pierre Desperois, LB-DO

Harlan Hodges: Keyboardist.

Kelly Matthews: Foley Artist

Graham Reynolds: Original Music Composer.

Buzz Moran: Sound Effects Creator

George Stumberg IV: Technical Director / FOH Engineer / Sound Design

Cami Alys: Foley Artist Understudy.

Jessie Douglas: Company Manager.

Tim Doyle: Comic-Book Artwork.

Paul Hanley and Lee Duhig: Color Art.

== History ==
In 1996, Ray Colgan approached Jason Neulander about the idea of creating a science-fiction radio serial to be performed live in installments and maybe event to be aired on the radio. Neulander jumped on the idea. He invited Jessica Reisman, Julia Edwards, and Lisa D'Amour to join Ray on the writing team and The Intergalactic Nemesis was born.

The original concept was that the writers would provide two 15-minute scripts per week for five weeks. Neulander got these scripts on a Friday, rehearsed with actors and sound on Saturday, and performed the two episodes on Sunday for five weeks at Little City coffeehouse. Because the process was so quick, the writers named the main characters after the actors who played them: Ben Willcott, Molly Rice, and Japhy Fernandez. Buzz Moran grabbed items out of his kitchen to make the last-minute sound effects. The first performance drew more than 100 people to the coffeehouse. Moran captured the show on a cassette-tape four track and the next summer local NPR affiliate KUT aired the show in serial format on their Sunday morning show Soundsight.

In 2000, Buzz bought a portable digital recording studio and suggested to Jason that SVT remount the show, cut it down to an evening-length format, perform it again and record a true broadcast-quality recording. Again, Neulander jumped and asked Ray and Jessica to help him rewrite it. On Memorial Day 2000, the crew set up shop at the State Theatre to a capacity crowd. The only original cast member was Ben Willcott, so the names of the other two main characters were changed. The performance was received so well that Ray and Jason immediately knew that the next summer they would have to create a sequel, which they did. Return of the Intergalactic Nemesis was performed and recorded in June 2001, both shows were performed in rep in 2002, and KUT aired a three-part edit of the show on its "Best of Public Radio" series.

In January 2009, Neulander approached artist Tim Doyle, who had created the backdrops for various productions, about developing a comic-book version of the story. As the two collaborators began work on the comic-book, Cliff Redd asked Neulander to bring the show into Dell Hall at the Long Center. In that meeting, Neulander came up with the idea of combining the comic-book artwork with the live show. In September 2010, the Long Center premiered this new form of entertainment to an audience of over 2,100 people.

== Sequel ==
The sequel to Book One: Target Earth is currently in production, titled Book Two: Robot Planet Rising. It follows the further adventures of Molly Sloan and Timmy Mendez after their defeat of the Zygonians, and premiered in Austin on June 8, 2012.
