= Carlos Alberto Barbosa =

Brazilian footballer (1954-1982)

Personal information
- Full name: Carlos Alberto Rodrigues Barbosa
- Date of birth: 15 February 1954
- Place of birth: Recife, Brazil
- Date of death: 7 March 1982 (aged 28)
- Place of death: Recife, Brazil
- Position: Defender

Senior career*
Years	Team	Apps	(Gls)
1973–1979	Santa Cruz	95	(1)
1980–1981	Internacional	10	(0)
1982	Sport Recife	10	(1)
Total		115	(2)

International career
1975	Brazil U20		
- * Club domestic league appearances and goals

Carlos Alberto Rodrigues Barbosa (15 February 1954 – 7 March 1982), also known as the White Man, was a Brazilian footballer. He died after suffering a heart attack during a game against XV de Jaú.

== Career statistics ==
=== Club ===
Club	Season	League			State League		Cup		Other		Total	
Club	Season	Division	Apps	Goals	Apps	Goals	Apps	Goals	Apps	Goals	Apps	Goals
Santa Cruz	1973	Série A	5	0	0	0	0	0	0	0	5	0
Santa Cruz	1975	Série A	14	0	0	0	0	0	0	0	5	0
Santa Cruz	1976	Série A	20	0	0	0	0	0	0	0	5	0
Santa Cruz	1977	Série A	17	1	0	0	0	0	0	0	5	0
Santa Cruz	1978	Série A	28	0	0	0	0	0	0	0	5	0
Santa Cruz	1979	Série A	11	0	0	0	0	0	0	0	5	0
Santa Cruz	Total		95	1	0	0	0	0	0	0	95	1
Internacional	1980	Série A	7	0	0	0	0	0	0	0	7	0
Internacional	1981	Série A	3	0	0	0	0	0	0	0	3	0
Internacional	Total		10	0	0	0	0	0	0	0	10	0
Sport Recife	1982	Série A	10	1	0	0	0	0	0	0	10	1
Career total			115	2	0	0	0	0	0	0	115	2
