= Barbarossa (grape) =

Variety of grape

- Grape (Vitis)
- Barbarossa grapes on the vine in Bertinoro
- Notable regions: Piedmont, Liguria, Emilia-Romagna

Barbarossa is the name of several red/pink colored Italian wine grape varieties. At one point the French wine grape Barbaroux was thought to also be a Barbarossa grape but DNA evidence published in 2009 confirmed that the French Barbaroux grown in Provence was a separate variety distinct from, at least, the Barbarossa grapes grown in Piedmont and Liguria. Further research is still being done map out the exact relation among all the Barbarossa varieties in Italy and with the Barbaroux grape grown in Corsica.

== History ==
The word Barbarossa is Italian for "red beard". According to legend in Emilia-Romagna, the grape was named after the red-bearded Holy Roman Emperor Frederick I ("Frederick Barbarossa") who spent time in the region during his many campaigns through Italy in the 12th century. However the earliest mention of a Barbarossa grape was not till 1600 when the Italian writer Giovanvettorio Soderini (also known under the pen name of Ciriegiulo) described a Tuscan wine grape under that name. As there are no current recorded plantings of a Barbarossa variety in Tuscany it is possible that Soderini's Barbarossa is extinct.

== Wine regions ==
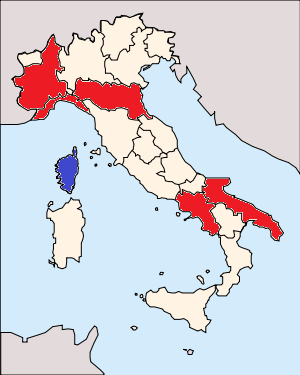
The provinces highlighted in red are regions where grape varieties known as Barbarossa are grown. Also highlighted in blue is the French island of Corsica, where the "Barbaroux" grape grown there may be identical to one of the Italian Barbarossa varieties.

In the Ligurian provinces of Genoa and Savona a vine called "Barbarossa di Finalborgo" is grown and is also known under the synonyms of Verduna and Verdona. While DNA testing has shown this variety to be different from the Barbaroux grown in Provence, the French ampelographer Pierre Galet has speculated that the Ligurian Barbarossa may still be the same variety as the Corsican Barbaroux used in the appellation d'origine contrôlée wines produced around Ajaccio. As of 2012, DNA profiling has not confirmed or disproved this theory.

In Piedmont, a table grape known as Barbarossa du Piémont is grown but not used for wine production. Galet has speculated that this variety is similar to the Barbaroux grown in Provence and used in the wines of the Cassis AOC, but DNA testing has showed that they are separate varieties.

In the Apulia and Campania wine regions of southern Italy, two distinct grape vines called "Barbarossa" are grown. While DNA profiling has shown that the two varieties are distinct from each other, it is still not known how these vines relate to the Barbarossa grown in northern and central Italy.

Some of the oldest Barbarossa vines in Italy are found in the Emilia-Romagna region, where a hundred-year-old vineyard owned by Fattoria Paradiso produces a varietal Barbarossa wine. Mario Pezzi, the owner of Fattoria Paradiso, claims to have cultivated it from a patch of uniquely small and red Sangiovese found by chance. As with the southern Italian Barbarossas, testing still needs to be done to determine the exact genetic origin of this Emilia-Romagna Barbarossa.
