= Stephen Mills =

American ballet dancer and choreographer (born 1960)

- Born: August 18, 1960 (age 65); Morganfield, Kentucky, U.S.
- Occupation: Choreographer

Stephen Mills (born August 18, 1960) is an American dancer and choreographer who is currently the Artistic Director/Choreographer at Ballet Austin. Under his tenure, Ballet Austin has been invited on four occasions to perform at the John F. Kennedy Center for the Performing Arts in Washington D.C.

Mills has performed at The Hong Kong Ballet, American Ballet Theatre Studio Company, The Atlanta Ballet, The Milwaukee Ballet, Washington Ballet, Cuballet in Havana, Cuba, BalletMet Columbus, The Dayton Ballet, The Sarasota Ballet of Florida, Ballet Pacifica, Dallas Black Dance Theater, The Louisville Ballet, The Nashville Ballet, Fort Worth/Dallas Ballet, The Sacramento Ballet and Dance Kaleidoscope.

== Career ==
=== Early years ===
Following 10 years of study in the Cincinnati Conservatory of Music, Mills started dancing at the age of 18. As a dancer, he performed with a companies such as the Harkness Ballet and The American Dance Machine under the direction of Lee Theadore. He also performed with the Cincinnati Ballet and The Indianapolis Ballet Theater before becoming a part of Ballet Austin 1986. Mills has danced roles in the George Balanchine repertoire as well as works by Choo-San Goh, John Butler, Ohad Naharin, Vicente Nebrada, Domy Reiter-Soffer and Mark Dendy.

=== Dance and ballets ===
Mills choreographed his first work, Red Roses, to the music of Edith Piaf in 1989 for Ballet Austin. In 1998, Mills was chosen to represent the United States through his work, Ashes, at Les Rencontres Chorégraphiques Internationales de Seine-Saint-Denis in Paris. Mills choreographed works for Ballet Austin as Resident Choreographer before being named artistic director in 2000. As Resident Choreographer he created works such as: A Midsummer Night’s Dream and Cinderella with the music of Alexander Glazunov.

In his inaugural season as artistic director in 2000, Mills released a production of Hamlet. He has worked with artists such as DJ Spooky on Echo Boom, visual artist Trenton Doyle Hancock on Cult of Color: Call to Color, The band Asleep at the Wheel on Big Sky, Shawn Colvin, flamenco artist José Greco on Bolero and award-winning Austin composer Graham Reynolds on Bounce, Though the Earth Gives Way, Cult of Color: Call to Color, and Belle REDUX/A Tale of Beauty & the Beast.

== Light / The Holocaust and Humanity Project ==
Mills' original ballet Light / The Holocaust & Humanity Project. The ballet is one piece of an educational initiative around The Holocaust. The work was meant as a way for art, dance to convene a broad conversation about The Holocaust and issues of genocide and human rights. According to an archived article by the Huffington Post, "Mills created the confrontational, distinctly contemporary ballet in 2005 after spending 18 months researching the Holocaust, when Germany's Nazi party exterminated more than 6 million Jews during World War II. The ballet is set to contemporary music by Steve Reich, Evelyn Glennie, Michael Gordon, Arvo Part and Philip Glass."

In 2005, Light / The Holocaust and Humanity Project was featured in KLRU's Arts In Context Ballet Austin's Light / The Holocaust and Humanity Project which won a Lone Star Emmy Award in the Magazine Format Program category. KLRU won a second Lone Star Emmy Award for their segment Producing Light, also depicting Mills' ballet.
