= Barbarossa (card game) =

Deck-building card game

- Japanese box art
- Publisher: Arclight Games
- Type: Deck-building game

Barbarossa is a 2010 Japanese deck-building game published by Arclight Games. Set in an alternate history of the Eastern Front of World War II, the game features moe, anime-styled female Nazi and Soviet forces. A 2016 sequel to the game, El Alamein, is set in the North African campaign. Arclight has released alternative versions of both games replacing the anime-styled art with historical photographs.

== Background ==
Barbarossa was released in Japan by Arclight Games in 2010, with an English-language release being published in North America in 2012. Players take the role of the Nazi army aiming to capture Moscow. The game depicts leaders such as Adolf Hitler, Erich von Manstein, and Joseph Stalin, as well as vehicles, as anime-styled women, often wearing scant clothing. A later edition of the game replaces the anime-styled artwork with real photographs of the historical subjects.

In 2015, a Kickstarter campaign for a sequel was launched, and it passed its goal of $10,000 in less than one hour. The sequel, El Alamein, takes place in North Africa and has players controlling the Afrika Korps against British forces.

== Gameplay ==
Barbarossa features deck-building mechanics similar to the 2008 game Dominion. The main changes to the gameplay revolve around combat. Army cards give the player Attack Points, which are needed for players to capture Objectives. Victory Points are collected when players capture Objective cards. Once per turn, players may declare an attack, and if they have enough Attack Points to match the value of a Minor Objective, they can capture it. Major Cities reward more Victory Points than Minor Objectives, and when players attack Major Cities they must resolve a card from an Event Deck; these cards often boost the target points of a Major City. The game ends when a player captures the final Major City, Moscow.

== See also ==
- Hypothetical Axis victory in World War II
