= Ballet Austin =

American ballet company

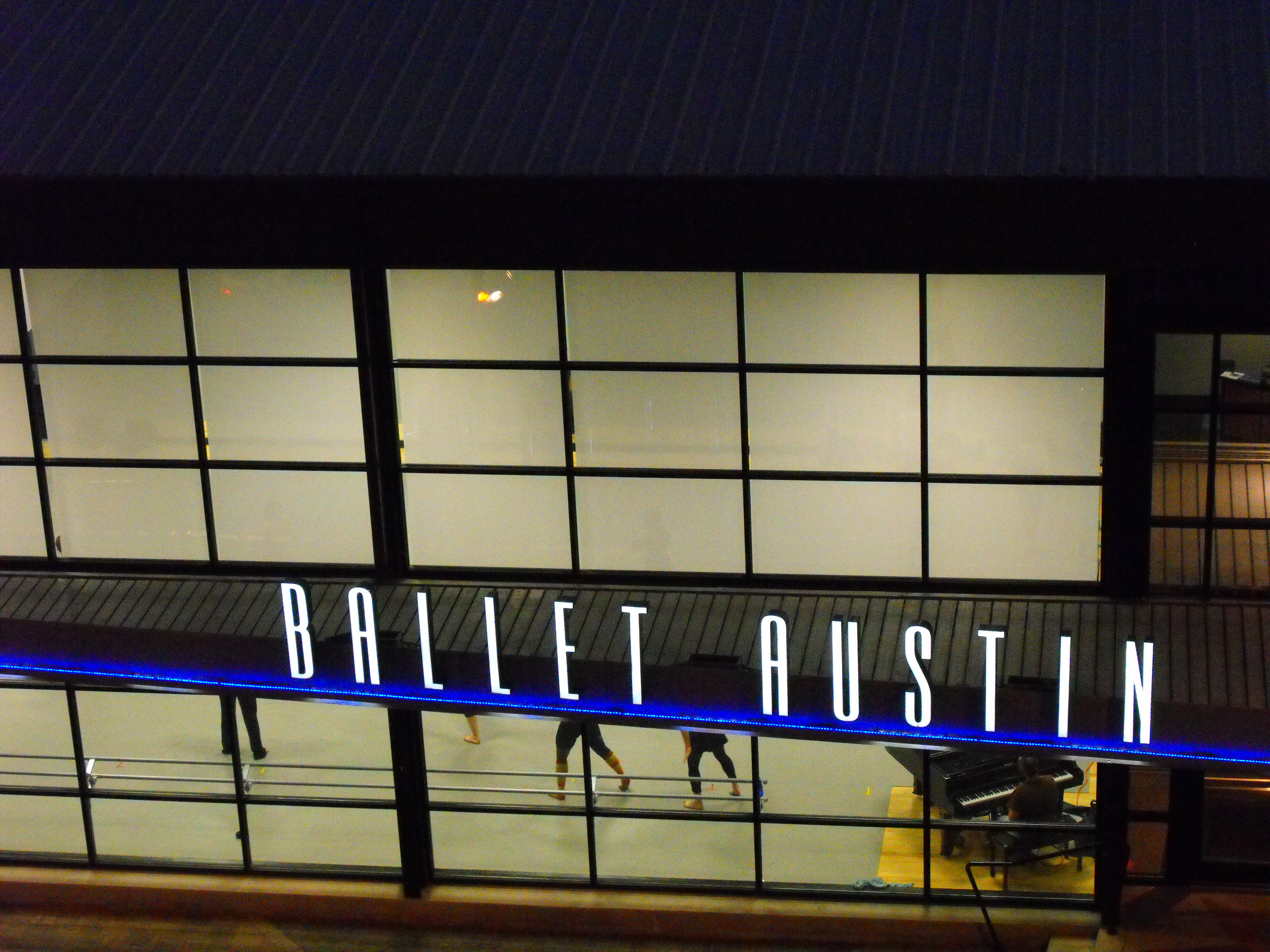
Ballet Austin

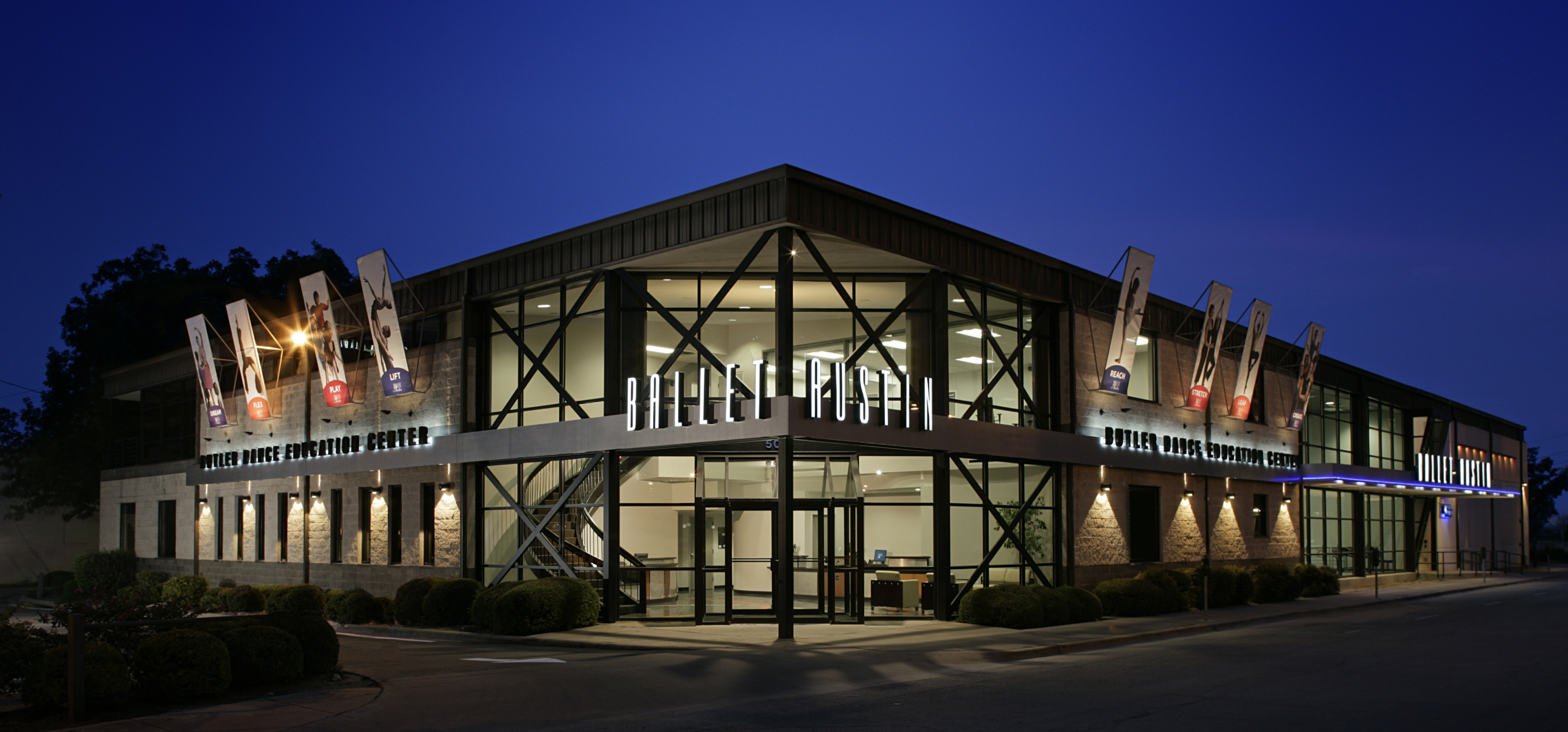
Main Ballet Austin Building

Ballet Austin is the 12th largest classical ballet company in the US, and also operates the largest combined training facility associated with a professional ballet company in the United States. Each year the Ballet Austin company performs ballets from a wide variety of choreographers, including Stephen Mills.

== Performances ==
Ballet Austin has performed in a State Department trip to Europe as well as at the Joyce Theater in New York City and The Kennedy Center in Washington, D.C.

== Education ==
The Ballet Austin Academy serves more than 900 students each year as one of the largest classical ballet schools in the country. It offers classes from creative movement, ages three and four, all the way to pre-professional. The academy students are given the opportunity to perform in the company production The Nutcracker, performed by Ballet Austin during the month of December for more than 53 years. Ballet Austin's Nutcracker is the longest running in the state of Texas.

Ballet Austin's apprentice company, Ballet Austin II, offers an opportunity for post-high school, advanced dancers to hone their skills. Established in 1999 by associate artistic director Michelle Martin, Ballet Austin II is made up of 10 emerging artists.

Founded in 2007, the Butler Center for Dance & Fitness serves over 8,000 people with year-round classes in ballet to modern, hip hop to hula, and jazz to Broadway. The company has developed outreach initiatives that reach 31 Central Texas school districts and 200 other area non-profits.

Ballet Austin offers fitness and dance programs for the public, such as yoga, Pilates, adult ballet, hula, hip-hop, jazz, tap, modern and musical theater.

== Facilities ==
Ballet Austin is located in a 34,000 sq/ft facility named the Butler Dance Education Center in downtown Austin at 3rd Street and San Antonio Street. The center features administrative offices, box office, eight rehearsal studios, a 1,500 sq. ft fully equipped Pilates studio and the AustinVentures StudioTheater with 287 seats.

== Reception ==
Dance Magazine called the ensemble "sleek and sophisticated", while The Washington Post dubbed it "one of the nation's best kept ballet secrets". Mills' work with Ballet Austin has been declared" whimsical and fantastic" (Dallas Morning News), "effortlessly striking" (Dance View Times), and "meaningful" (Pointe magazine).

== Artists ==
=== Artistic Director ===
Named Artistic Director in 2000, Stephen Mills is an American dancer and choreographer.

=== Company dancers ===
There are twenty two full-time professional dancers, recruited from an annual 30-city audition tour. As of November 2015:

- Ian J. Bethany
- Orlando Julius Canova
- Edward Carr
- Oliver Greene-Cramer
- James Fuller
- Ashley Lynn Sherman
- Rebecca Johnson
- Aara Krumpe
- Grace Morton
- Kevin Murdock-Waters
- Preston Andrew Patterson
- Elise Pekarek
- Chelsea Renner
- Brittany Strickland
- Christopher Swaim
- Cassia Wilson
- Jaime Lynn Witts

=== Ballet Austin II dancers ===
As of September 2016:

- Abby Chen
- Christina Cole
- Nicole Del Bene
- Constance Doyle
- Katherine Deuitch
- Paul Martin
- Hailey Dupont
- Matthew Gattozzi
- Jake Howard
- Madeline Mass

== See also ==
- Stanley Hall (dancer)
