= Julia Barbosa Landois =

American artist (born 1959)

Julia Barbosa Landois (born 1959) is an American artist, known for her work in performance art, installation art, and video art. Her art examines themes such as gender and religion, often incorporating humor and satire. She has lived in Houston and San Antonio, Texas.

== Early life and education ==
Julia Barbosa Landois was born in 1959, in the United States. She received a Bachelor of Fine Arts degree from the University of Texas San Antonio in 2003, and a Master of Fine Arts in Sculpture New Media from the University of Pennsylvania in 2007.

== Career ==
Barbosa Landois’ neighborhood flooded during Hurricane Harvey in 2017. This event influenced her to modify her Luminaria work to reflect the impact of the tragedy.

Barbosa Landois has showcased her art in venues across San Antonio, Texas, including the Cactus Bra Space, and the Guadalupe Cultural Arts Center.

Her performance piece Veiled in Flesh involves her sitting silently in a plexiglass enclosure while mice crawl around her, inviting reflection on the relationship between religion and the body. Works like Star-Crossed II (2013) explore gender roles and religious themes, while Buried, not Dead (2013) addresses human migration.

In addition to her solo projects, Barbosa Landois has collaborated with artists such as Jimmy James Canales, performing a religious-themed song. Barbosa Landois collaborated with Erik Sanden to create Culo de Oro, a piece that uses satirical performance to explore the sex trade in both Texas and Nuevo Laredo. Additionally, she collaborated with Jamal Cyrus in a work titled Regional Fictions.

=== Exhibits ===
Barbosa Landois has shown her work in several exhibitions. Her piece was featured in Right Here, Right Now: San Antonio was shown at the Contemporary Art Museum Houston. In 2020, her work As Above Below was exhibited at the Houston Airport. Additionally, in 2021, she presented Sidesteps (Purslane) at the Bryant Art Gallery at Coastal Carolina University.
