= Barbaroux =

Variety of grape

- Grape (Vitis)
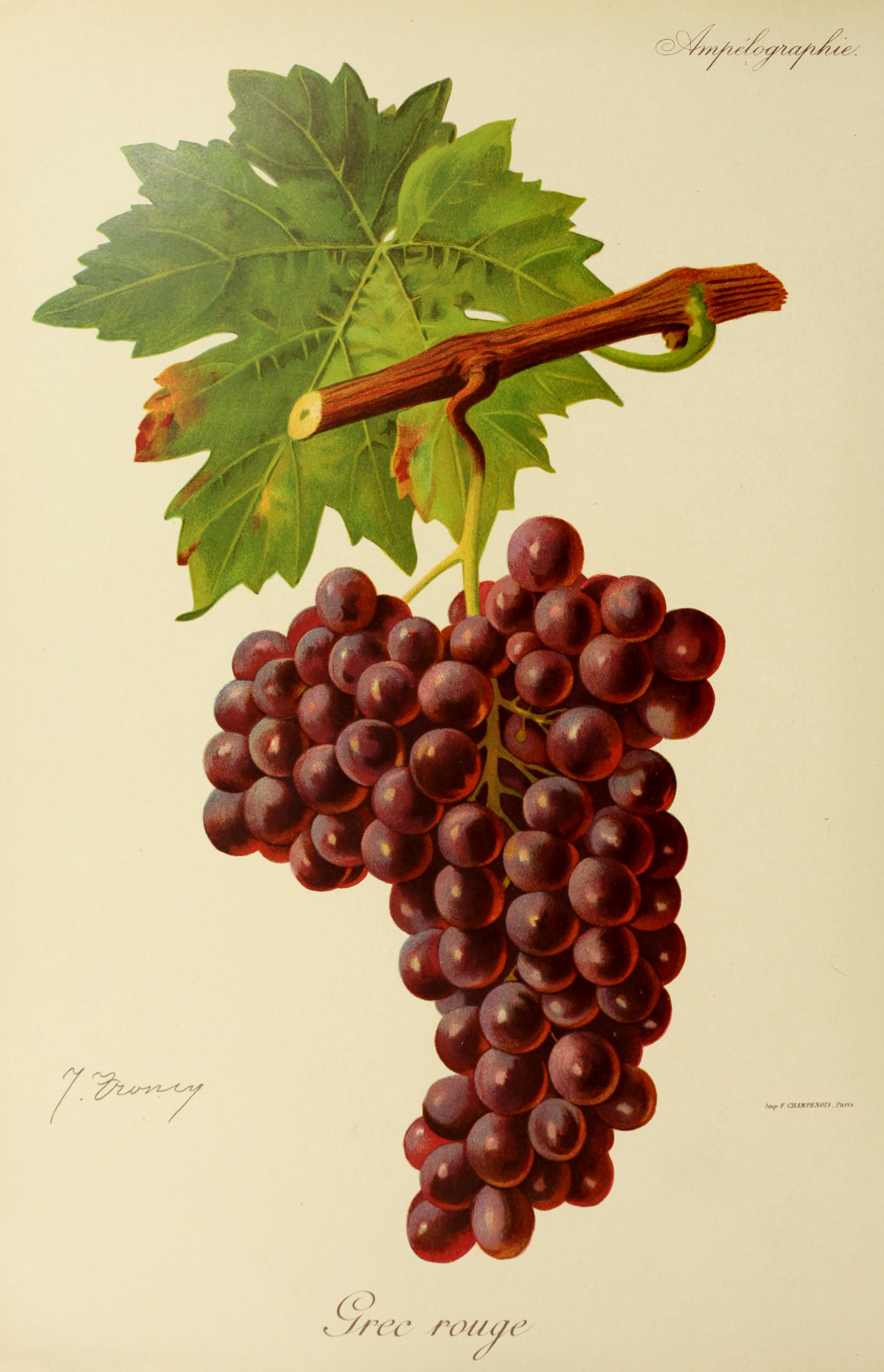
- Barbaroux in Viala & Vermorel (as Grec Rouge)
- Color of berry skin: Rose
- Species: Vitis vinifera
- Also called: Barbarossa and other synonyms
- Notable regions: France, Provence and Corsica
- VIVC number: 973

Barbaroux (also known as Grec rouge) is a pink-skinned French wine grape variety grown in southeastern France. It is a permitted variety in the appellation d'origine contrôlée wine of Cassis in Provence as well as in the Ajaccio region of Corsica. While it is sometimes known under the synonym "Barbarossa", DNA profiling has shown the Barbaroux grown in Provence is distinct from the Barbarossa vines grown in Liguria and Piedmont and is likely unrelated to all Italian Barbaross vines. There is also debate among ampelographers about whether the Barbaroux vines in Provence and Corsica are the same grape or separate Vitis vinifera varieties.

== History ==
The oldest potential mention of Barbaroux grape, under the synonym Barbarons, dates to 1667 when it was described as being used as both wine and table grape in Toulon in the Provence region of southern France. Here the vine is described as having massive clusters of large violet colored berries. However, despite the synonyms use, there is some doubt among ampelographers about this reference since the modern Barbaroux vine of Provence has more pink-ish colored skins though the violet description could be referring to the color of the wine, particularly after a long period of extended maceration. The name "Barbaroux" itself comes from the term barbarous which means "reddish berries" in the Provençal dialect. The first appearance of the modern spelling of Barbaroux appeared in 1715.

== Viticulture ==
The Barbaroux vine has the potential to be very fertile and high yielding but is generally not very vigorous. It buds early but requires a long growing season before it large berries and clusters achieves full ripeness. Among the viticultural hazards that Barbaroux is susceptible to are botrytis bunch rot and powdery mildew.

== Wine regions and AOC regulations ==
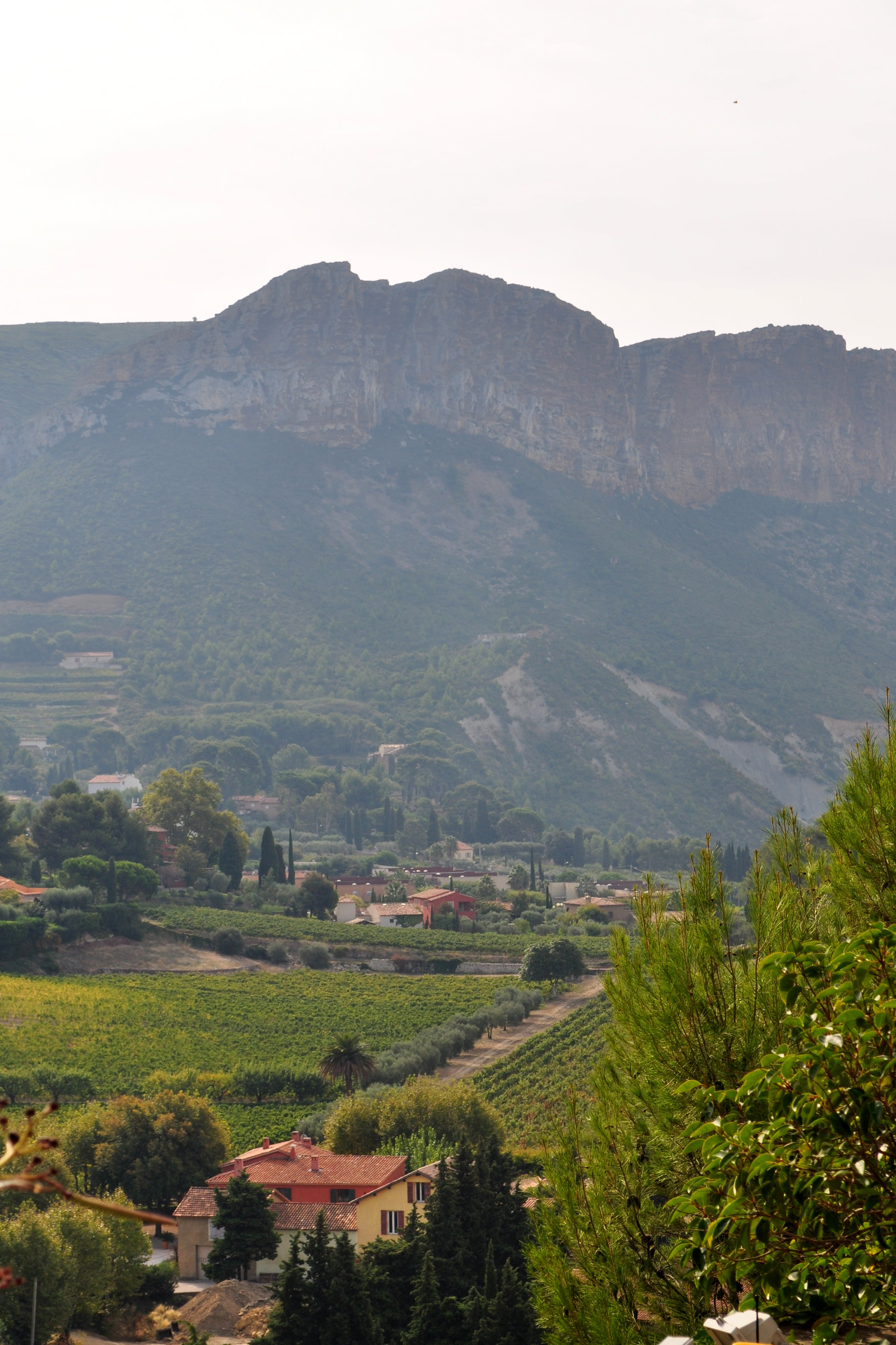
Barbaroux is an authorized grape in AOC production of the white wine made in the Cassis region (pictured).

Despite being an authorized grape for the red, white and rosé wines of the Côtes de Provence and Cassis AOC, plantings of Barbaroux have been on the decline in the Provence region with only 94 acres (38 hectares) of the vine reported in 2008, most of it in the Cassis region. These numbers are likely to continue to drop as AOC wine laws governing its use in the Côtes de Provence AOC now limit the inclusion of Barbaroux to grapes harvested from vines that were planted before 1994.

In Cassis, Barbaroux can be blended with Mourvèdre, Cinsault and Grenache in the red and rosé wines or it can be used to produce a white wine made with very little skin contact. Usually blended with Clairette, Bourboulenc, Marsanne, Sauvignon blanc or Trebbiano, Barbaroux can add deep gold color and aromatics to the blend.

In Corsica it is used in red and rosé wines where it is permitted in the Ajaccio and Vin de Corse AOCs. Here it is blended with Sciacarello, Nielluccio, Rolle, Carignan, Syrah, Grenache and Cinsault.

For both Ajaccio and Cassis, Barbaroux grapes destined for AOC wine production must be harvested to yields no greater than 45 hectoliters/hectare with the finished wine needing to attain a minimum alcohol level of at least 12% in Ajaccio and 11% in Cassis. For the larger Vin de Corse AOC, Barbaroux can be harvested to yields up to 50 hectoliters/hectare with the finished wines needing an alcohol level of at least 11.5%.

== Confusion with other grapes ==
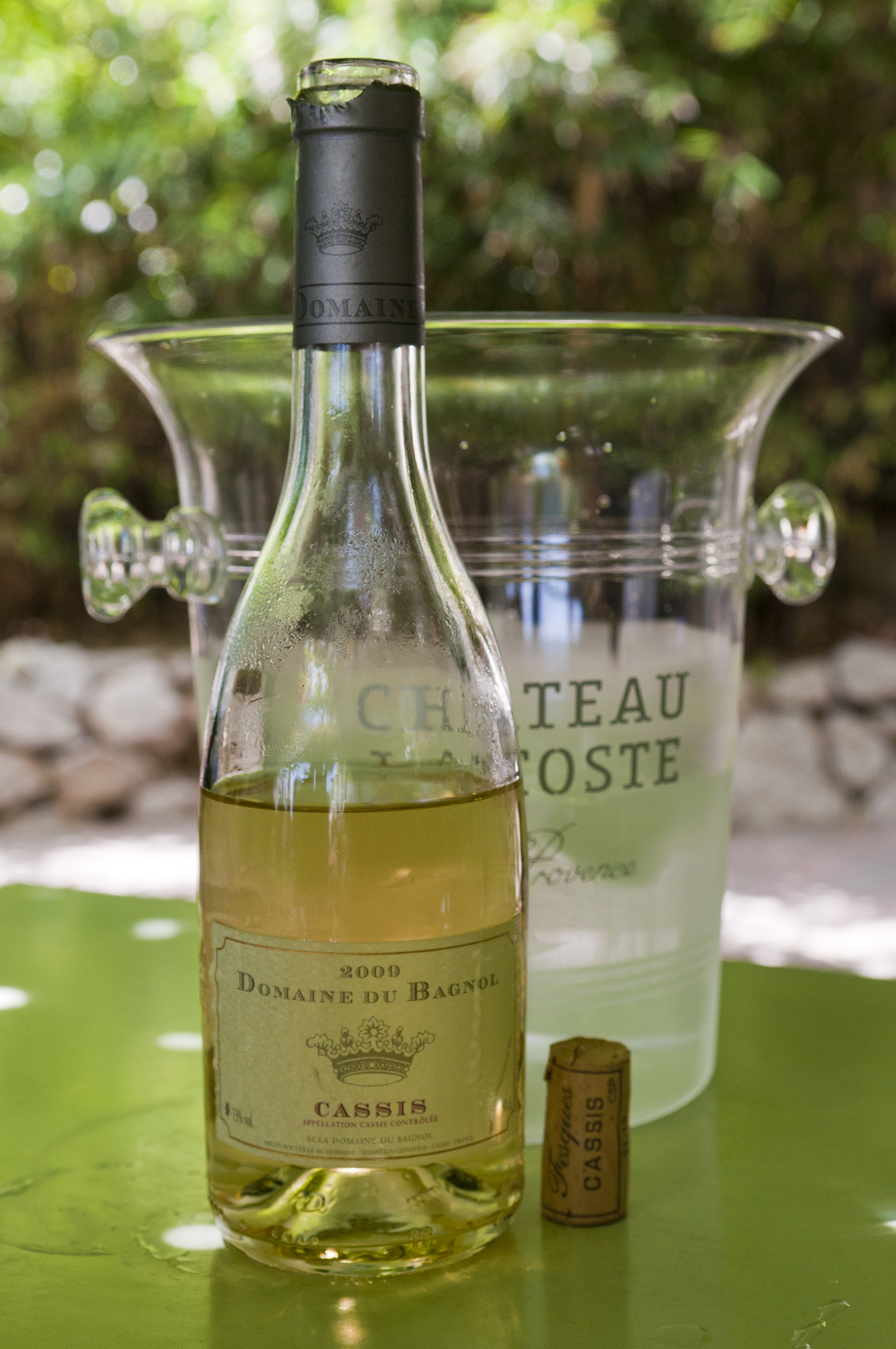
Along with Clairette, Marsanne, Bourboulenc and other grapes, Barbaroux can be used in the white AOC blend of Cassis.

While long thought to be the same variety, in 2009 DNA testing showed that the Barbaroux vine of Provence was different from the Barbarossa vines grown in Liguria and Piedmont and likely different from the other Italian varieties also known as Barbarossa. As of 2012, it had not yet been determined if the Barbaroux vine grown in Corsica is different from the Provençal variety and what relationship, if any, that the Corsican Barbaroux may have with any of the Italian Barbarossa varieties.

Despite having several synonyms similar to Gänsfüssler, the Provençal and Corsican Barbaroux vines are not related to red German wine grape of the same name that grows in the Rheinland-Pfalz region of Germany.

== Synonyms ==
Over the years Barbaroux has been known under a variety of synonyms recognized by the Vitis International Variety Catalogue. However, as more DNA research leads to the proper identification of Barbaroux vines some of these synonyms may be found to belong to completely separate varieties such as the Italian Barbarossa grapes. But as of 2012, the current list of recognized synonyms for Barbaroux include:

Aronova Boroda, Barbaraise de Provence, Barbarons, Barbarossa, Barbarossa Rose, Barbaru, Barbi Rossa, Barbirossa, Barbirossu, Roter Calebstraube, Candolle Roth, Roter Candollo, Cardeina, De Kandol, Gänsefüssler, Hellroter Gänsfüssler, Grappe de Cinq Kilos, Gray Rouge, Grec Rose, Grec Rouge, Gromier du Cantal, Gros Barbaroux, Gros Gommier du Cantal, Roter Hammelshode, Kanaani, Kanaantraube, Limdi Kana, Malaga Rose, Merveille, Monstrueux de Candolle, Murcentin, Pepin Isfaganskii, Perle Rose, Roter Perltraube, Plant du Pauvre, Pompeiana, Prun Gentile, Rabigato Franco, Raisin du Pauvre, Raisin Grec, Raisin Monstrueux, Regina Rossa, Roter Riesentraube, Rossea, Rossoly, Roussee, Rousselet, and Sorita.
