= List of 21st-century women artists =

This is a partial list of 21st-century women artists, sorted alphabetically by decade of birth. These artists are known for creating artworks that are primarily visual in nature, in traditional media such as painting, sculpture, photography, printmaking, ceramics as well as in more recently developed genres, such as installation art, performance art, conceptual art, digital art and video art. Do not add entries for those without a Wikipedia article.

The list starts with artists born in 1970 and later. For earlier births see List of 20th-century women artists.

== 1970–1979 ==
=== A ===
- Luciana Abait, b. 1971, Argentine-American muralist and digital photographer
- Jumana Emil Abboud, b. 1971, Palestinian, multidisciplinary artist
- Lida Abdul, b. 1973, Afghan, video artist
- Michele Abeles, b. 1977, American, photographer
- Dhruvi Acharya, b. 1971, Indian, painter
- Lynsey Addario, b. 1973, American, photojournalist
- Golnar Adili, b. 1976, American (b. Iran), multidisciplinary artist
- Deborah Adler, b. 1975, American, designer
- Laurence Aëgerter, b. 1972, French, video artist
- Mequitta Ahuja, b. 1976, American, painter
- Kaoru Akagawa, b. 1973, Japanese, artist
- Manal AlDowayan, b. 1973, Saudi, installation artist
- Shirin Aliabadi, 1973–2018, Iranian, multi-disciplinary artist
- Emily Allchurch, b. 1974, British, photographer
- Doa Aly, b. 1976, Egyptian, multimedia artist
- Miya Ando, b. 1973, American, multimedia visual artist
- Liliana Angulo Cortés, b. 1974, Colombian, sculptor
- Nazgol Ansarinia, b. 1979, Iranian, sculptor
- Chiho Aoshima, b. 1974, Japanese, multi-disciplinary artist
- Julieta Aranda, b. 1975, Mexican, conceptual artist
- Einat Arif-Galanti, b. 1975, Israeli, photographer
- Natalie Ascencios, b. 1971, American, painter and illustrator
- Keri Ataumbi, b. 1971, American, jewelry maker
- Amalie Atkins, b. 1975, Canadian, video artist
- Maya Attoun, 1974–2022, Israeli multidisciplinary artist
- Shereen Audi, b. 1970, Jordanian, multidisciplinary artist
- damali ayo, b. 1972, American, conceptual artist, performance artist, and author

=== B ===
- Carrie Ann Baade, b. 1974, American, painter
- Nina Lola Bachhuber, b. 1971, German, installation artist
- Jessica Backhaus, b. 1970, German, photographer
- Fia Backström, b. 1970, Swedish, installation artist
- Nairy Baghramian, b. 1971, Iranian, sculptor
- Kristin Baker, b. 1975, American, painter
- Hayley Barker, b. 1973, American, painter
- Yto Barrada, b. 1971, French, multimedia artist
- Yael Bartana, b. 1970, Israeli, installation artist
- Del Kathryn Barton, b. 1972, Australian, painter
- Catalina Bauer, b. 1976, Chilean, installation artist
- Marie-Hélène Beaulieu, b. 1979, Canadian, glass artist
- Gina Beavers, b. 1974, American, painter
- Claire Beckett, b. 1978, American, photographer
- Vivian Beer, b. 1977, American, furniture designer
- Beili Liu, b. 1974, Chinese, installation artist
- Katerina Belkina, b. 1974, Russian, photographer
- Vaughn Bell, b. 1978, American, environmental artist
- Elisabeth Belliveau, b. 1979, Canadian, interdisciplinary artist
- Tamy Ben-Tor, b. 1975, Israeli, photographer
- Catherine Bertola, b. 1976, British, installation artist
- Amy Bessone, b. 1970, American, painter
- Melanie Bilenker, b. 1978, American, jewelry maker
- Bingyi, b. 1975, Chinese, painter
- Rossella Biscotti, b. 1978, Italian, installation artist
- Karla Black, b. 1972, Scottish, sculptor
- Tatiana Blass, b. 1979, Brazilian, multimedia artist
- Tia Blassingame, b. 1971, American, book artist
- Katinka Bock, b. 1976, German, sculptor
- Shannon Bool, b. 1972, Canadian, interdisciplinary artist
- Diane Borsato, b. 1973, Canadian, interdisciplinary artist
- Sarah Bostwick, b. 1979, American, multidisciplinary artist
- Carol Bove, b. 1971, American, sculpture
- Shary Boyle, b. 1972, Canadian, interdisciplinary artist
- Kerstin Brätsch, b. 1979, German, painter
- Candice Breitz, b. 1972, South African, photographer
- Sarina Brewer, b. 1970, American, Taxidermy Sculpture
- Sandra Brewster, b. 1973, Canadian, interdisciplinary artist
- Stephanie Brooks, b. 1970, American, conceptual artist
- Amanda Browder, b. 1976, American, installation artist
- Melissa Brown (artist), b. 1974, American, painter
- Bu Hua, b. 1973, Chinese, digital artist
- Karin Bubaš, b. 1976, Canadian, photographer
- Victoria Burge, b. 1976, American, printmaker
- Bogna Burska, b. 1974, Polish, installation artist
- Bisa Butler, b. 1973, American, fiber artist
- Andrea Büttner, b. 1972, German, multimedia artist

=== C ===
- Nancy Cadogan, b. 1979, British, painter
- Nancy Baker Cahill, b. 1970, American, multidisciplinary artist
- Marie Caillou, b. 1971, French, graphic artist
- Sarah Cain, b. 1979, American, painter
- Andrea Carlson, b. 1979, American, mixed-media visual artist
- Gillian Carnegie, b. 1971, British, painter
- Nicoletta Ceccoli, b. 1973, Italian, illustrator
- Banu Cennetoğlu, b. 1970, Turkish, installation artist
- Rebecca Chamberlain, b. 1970, American, visual artist
- Hsia-Fei Chang, b. 1973, Taiwanese, installation artist
- Alice Channer, b. 1977, British, sculptor
- Zoë Charlton, b. 1973, American, painter, educator
- Nicole Chesney, b. 1971, American, glass artist
- Ruby Chishti, b. 1963, Pakistani-American, textile artist
- Swarna Chitrakar, b. 1974, Indian, painter
- Liyen Chong, b. 1979, New Zealander, textile artist
- Julia Rosa Clark, b. 1975, South African, installation artist
- Michal Cole, b. 1974, Israeli, multi-disciplinary artist
- Elizabeth Colomba, b. 1976, French, painter
- Kelli Connell, b. 1974, American, photographer
- Anna Conway, b. 1973, American, photographer
- Cristina Córdova b. 1976, American, sculptor
- Leela Corman, b. 1972, American, illustrator, cartoonist
- Anne-Lise Coste, b. 1973, French, painter
- Shealah Craighead, b. 1976, American, photographer
- Anna Craycroft, b. 1975, American, conceptual artist
- Zoe Crosher, b. 1975, American, photographer
- Sarah Crowner, b. 1974, American, painter
- Jennifer Crupi, b. 1973, American, jeweler
- Lilibeth Cuenca Rasmussen, b. 1970, Danish, performance artist
- Amy Cutler, b. 1974, American, painter, printmaker

=== D ===
- Elena Damiani, b. 1979, Peruvian, sculptor, installation artist
- Mira Dancy, b. 1979, American, painter
- Nathalie Daoust, b. 1977, Canadian, photographer
- Marisa Darasavath, b. 1972, Laotian, painter
- Angélica Dass, b. 1979, Brazilian, photographer
- Kate Daudy, b. 1970, British, sculptor
- Anette Dawn, b. 1978, Hungarian, ceramicist
- Manon De Pauw, b. 1971, Canadian, installation artist
- Jennifer Des, b. 1975, Belgian, photographer
- Stephanie Deshpande, b. 1975, American, painter
- Rosana Castrillo Diaz, b. 1971, Spanish, sculptor
- Amie Dicke, b. 1978, Dutch, painter
- Erika Diettes, b. 1978, Colombian, photographer
- Trisha Donnelly, b. 1974, American, conceptual artist
- Arabella Dorman, b. 1975, British, painter
- Annabel Dover, b. 1975, British, painter
- Maura Doyle, b. 1973, Canadian, sculptor
- Charlotte Dumas, b. 1977, Dutch, photographer
- Celeste Dupuy-Spencer, b. 1979, American, painter

=== E ===
- Mary Early, b. 1975, American, sculptor
- Beka Economopoulos, b. 1974, American, artist, activist
- Daniela Edburg, b. 1975, Mexican, photographer
- Rena Effendi, b. 1977, Azerbaijani, photographer
- Aleana Egan, b. 1979, Irish, sculptor
- Echo Eggebrecht, b. 1977, American, painter
- Amy Elkins, b. 1979, American, photographer
- Hala Elkoussy, b. 1974, Egyptian, installation artist
- Carson Ellis, b. 1975, American, illustrator
- Wanda Ewing, 1970–2013, American, collage, printmaking, latch hook
- Éliane Excoffier, b. 1971, Canadian, photographer

=== F ===
- Cherine Fahd, b. 1974, Australian, photographer
- Faith47, b. 1979, South African, muralist
- Rachel Farmer, b. 1972, American, ceramic sculpture, installations
- Golnaz Fathi, b. 1972, Iranian, painter
- Lara Favaretto, b. 1973, Italian, installation artist and sculptor
- Delphine Fawundu, b. 1971, American, photographer
- Nicole Phungrasamee Fein, b. 1974, American, painter
- Rachel Feinstein (artist), b. 1971, American, sculptor
- Dee Ferris, b. 1973, British, painter
- Janet Fieldhouse, b. 1971, Australian, ceramic artist
- Emily Flake, b. 1977, American, illustrator, cartoonist
- Jess Flood-Paddock, b. 1977, British, sculptor
- Susan Folwell, b. 1970, American, ceramicist
- Laura Oldfield Ford, b. 1973, British, painter
- Rachel Foullon, b. 1978, American, sculptor
- Dana Frankfort, b. 1971, American, painter
- Julie Freeman, b. 1972, British, digital artist
- Gabríela Friðriksdóttir, b. 1971, Icelandic, painter

=== G ===
- Ellie Ga, b. 1976, American, video, installation, sculpture and performance
- Susie Ganch b. 1971, American, sculptor, jeweler
- Chitra Ganesh, b. 1975, American, visual artist
- Camille Rose Garcia, b. 1970, American, painter
- Iliana emilia García, b. 1970, Dominican, sculptor
- Amy Gartrell, b. 1974, American, painter
- Lalya Gaye, b. 1978, Swiss, digital artist
- Leyla Gediz, b. 1974, Turkish, painter
- Margi Geerlinks, b. 1970, Dutch, photographer
- Vanessa German, b. 1976, American, sculptor
- Zhenya Gershman, b. 1975, American, painter
- Samara Golden, b. 1973, American, installation artist
- Gabriela Golder, b. 1971, Argentine, installation artist
- Frances Goodman, b. 1975, South African, mixed media artist
- Patricia Goslee (b. 1970), American, painter, curator
- Star Gossage, b. 1973, New Zealander, painter
- Charlotte Graham, b. 1972, New Zealander, painter
- Amy Granat, b. 1976, American, film maker
- Nicola Green, b. 1972, British, painter
- Rona Green (artist), b. 1972, Australian, multidisciplinary artist
- Jillian Green, b. 1975, Australian, painter
- Isca Greenfield-Sanders, b. 1978, American, painter
- Dara Greenwald, 1971–2012, American, interdisciplinary art
- Clare Grill, b. 1979, American, painter
- Liza Grobler, b. 1974, South African, installation artist
- Kate Groobey, b. 1979, British, painter
- Debbie Grossman, b. 1977, American, photographer
- Eva Grubinger, b. 1970, Austrian, installation artist
- Eva Grubinger, b. 1970, Austrian, installation artist
- Małgorzata Dawidek Gryglicka, b. 1976, Polish, installation artist
- Sabrina Gschwandtner, b. 1977, American, film and textile artist
- Shilpa Gupta, b. 1976, Indian, multimedia artist
- Nilbar Güreş, b. 1977, Turkish, multimedia artist

=== H ===
- Elpida Hadzi-Vasileva, b. 1971, Macedonian, sculptor
- Roxana Halls, b. 1974, British, painter
- Anthea Hamilton, b. 1978, British, sculptor and performance artist
- Hollis Hammonds, b. 1971, American, installation artist
- Hilary Harkness, b. 1971, American, painter
- Jenny Hart, b. 1972, American, embroidery
- Emma Hart (artist), b. 1974, British, performance artist
- Andrea Hasler, b. 1975, Swiss, sculptor
- Kendra Haste, b. 1971, British, sculptor
- Julia Hasting, b. 1970, German, graphic designer
- Sharon Hayes (artist), b. 1970, American, multimedia artist
- Anne Duk Hee Jordan, b. 1978, German, sculptor
- Michal Helfman, b. 1973, Israeli, multi-disciplinary artist
- Mercedes Helnwein, b. 1979, Austrian, multimedia artist
- Camille Henrot, b. 1978, French, video artist
- Sooreh Hera, b. 1973, Iranian, photographer
- Leslie Hewitt, b. 1977, American, visual artist
- Hiromix, b. 1976, Japanese, photographer
- Wuon-Gean Ho, b. 1973, British, printmaker
- Sarah Hobbs, b. 1970, American, photographer
- Naomi Hobson, b. 1979, Australian, painter, photographer
- Jungil Hong, b. 1976, American, printmaker
- Peregrine Honig, b. 1976, American, visual artist
- Risa Horowitz, b. 1970, Canadian, multidisciplinary artist
- Sheree Hovsepian, b. 1974, Iranian, photographer
- Sasha Huber, b. 1975, Finnish, multimedia artist
- Letitia Huckaby, b. 1972, American, photographer
- Katie Hudnall b. 1979 American, woodworker
- Jessica Jackson Hutchins, b. 1971, American, sculptor

=== I ===
- Alice Instone, b. 1975, British, painter

=== J ===
- Claerwen James, b. 1970, British, painter
- Elizabeth James-Perry, b. 1973, American, sculptor and jewelry-maker
- Renata Jaworska, b. 1979, Polish, painter
- Natasha Johns-Messenger, b. 1970, Australian, installation artist
- Jess Johnson, b. 1979, New Zealander, installation artist

=== K ===
- Nadia Kaabi-Linke, b. 1978, Tunisian, sculptor
- Reena Saini Kallat, b. 1973, Indian, installation artist
- Priya Kambli, b. 1975, Indian, photographer
- Kika Karadi, b. 1975, Hungarian-American, painter
- Amal Kenawy, 1974–2012, Egyptian, performance artist
- Vivian Keulards, b. 1970, Dutch, photographer
- Anita Khemka, b. 1972, Indian, photographer
- Nadia Khiari, b. 1973, Tunisian, illustrator
- Yuki Kihara, b. 1975, New Zealander, multi-disciplinary artist
- Te Rongo Kirkwood, b. 1973, New Zealander, glass artist
- Kapwani Kiwanga, b. 1978, Canadian, multimedia artist
- Rachel Kneebone, b. 1973, British, sculptor
- Lara Knutson, b. 1974, American, industrial designer
- Katrin Koenning, b. 1978, Australian, photographer
- Serena Korda, b. 1979, British, sculptor and performance artist
- Katrin Korfmann, b. 1971, German, photographer
- Annette Krauss, b. 1971, Dutch, performance artist
- Ella Kruglyanskaya, b. 1978, Latvian, painter
- Maya Kulenovic, b. 1975, Canadian, painter
- Alena Kupčíková, b. 1976, Czech, drawer
- Agnieszka Kurant, b. 1978, Polish, conceptual artist
- Anna Kurtycz, 1970–2019, Mexican, graphic artist
- Miriam Syowia Kyambi, b. 1979, Kenyan, installation artist

=== L ===
- Jessica Lagunas, b. 1971, Nicaraguan, fiber artist
- Au Hoi Lam, b. 1978, Chinese, painter
- Aylin Langreuter, b. 1976, German, conceptual artist
- Frida Larios, b. 1974, Costa Rican, typo-graphic artist
- Annika Larsson, b. 1972, Swedish, video artist
- Ruth Laskey, b. 1975, American, textile artist, painter
- Michelle LaVallee, b. 1977, Canadian, painter
- Deana Lawson, b. 1979, American, educator, photographer
- Nikki S. Lee, b. 1970, American, visual artist
- Helen Lee (artist), b. 1978, American, glass artist
- Glenda León, b. 1976, Cuban, installation artist
- Aia Leu, b. 1971, Swiss, artist
- Jennifer Levonian, b. 1977, American, animator
- Jen Lewin, b. 1974, American, interactive artist
- Olia Lialina, b. 1971, Russian, internet artist
- Klara Lidén, b. 1979, Swedish, installation artist
- Anya Liftig, b. 1977, American, performance artist
- Stephanie Liner, b. 1978, American, sculptor
- Tanya Lukin Linklater, b. 1976, Alutiiq (American), performance artist
- Beth Lipman, b. 1971, American, glass artist
- Katja Loher, b. 1979, Swiss, installation artist
- Victoria Lomasko, b. 1978, Russian, graphic artist
- Sarah Longley, b. 1975, Irish, painter
- Juliette Losq, b. 1978, British, painter
- Camilla Løw, b. 1976, Norwegian, sculptor
- Fiona Lowry, b. 1974, Australian, painter
- Valerie Lynch Napaltjarri, b. 1970, Australian, painter and printmaker

=== M ===
- Anissa Mack, b. 1970, American, multimedia artist
- Man Yu, b. 1978, Costa Rican, painter
- Elena Manferdini, b. 1974, American, architect
- Jeannine Marchand b. 1976, American, ceramicist
- Alisa Margolis, b. 1975, Ukrainian, painter
- MariNaomi, b. 1973, American, graphic artist
- Delita Martin, b. 1972, American, multimedia artist
- Sharon Massey b. 1977, American, jewellery designer
- Christy Matson, b. 1979, American, textile artist
- Carey Maxon, b. 1978, American, painter
- Ursula Mayer, b. 1970, Austrian, multimedia artist
- Sanaz Mazinani, b. 1978, Iranian, installation artist
- Sanaz Mazinani, b. 1978, Canadian, multidisciplinary artist
- Cat Mazza, b. 1977, American, textile artist
- Kerry McAleer-Keeler, b. 1971, printmaker, book artist
- J. J. McCracken, b. 1972, American, multimedia artist
- Eline McGeorge, b. 1970, Norwegian, multi-disciplinary artist
- Sarah McKenzie (artist), b. 1971, American, painter
- Lucy McKenzie, b. 1977, British, painter
- Lucy McLauchlan, b. 1977, British, painter
- Lucy McRae, b. 1979, Australian, body architect
- Julie Mehretu, b. 1970, American, painter
- America Meredith, b. 1972, American, painter, curator, editor
- Natacha Merritt, b. 1977, American, photographer
- Maggie Michael, b. 1974, American, painter
- Tricia Middleton, b. 1972, Canadian, installation artist
- Lê Hiền Minh, b. 1979, Vietnamese, installation artist
- Helen Mirra, b. 1970, American, conceptual artist
- Aiko Miyanaga, b. 1974, Japanese, sculptor
- Melinda Mollineaux, b. 1964, Canadian, multimedia artist
- Jennifer Moon, b. 1973, American, conceptual artist
- Ayanah Moor, b. 1973, American, conceptual artist
- Nyeema Morgan, b. 1977, American, conceptual artist
- Junko Mori, b. 1974, Japanese, metalworker
- Ulrike Müller (artist), b. 1971, Austrian, painter
- Rerrkirrwanga Mununggurr, b. 1971, Australian, painter
- Wangechi Mutu, b. 1972, Kenyan-American, collage painter

=== N ===
- Sagit Zluf Namir, b. 1978, Israeli, photographer
- Rosella Namok, b. 1979, Australian, painter
- Shervone Neckles, b. 1979, American, interdisciplinary artist
- Elizabeth Neel, b. 1975, American, painter
- Katrīna Neiburga, b. 1978, Latvian, video artist
- Gabisile Nkosi, b. 1974, South African, artist and printmaker
- Dorota Nieznalska, b. 1973, Polish, sculptor
- Rika Noguchi, b. 1971, Japanese, photographer

=== O ===
- Kuzana Ogg, b. 1971, Indian, painter
- Haji Oh, b. 1976, Korean, textile artist
- Nnenna Okore, b. 1975, Australian, fiber artist
- Okwui Okpokwasili, b. 1972, American, artist, performer, choreographer
- Senam Okudzeto, b. 1972, American, installation artist
- Olek (artist), b. 1978, Polish, sculptor, textile artist
- Camila Oliveira Fairclough, b. 1979, Brazilian, painter
- Paulina Olowska, b. 1976, Polish, multi-disciplinary artist
- Robyn O'Neil, b. 1977, American, drawer
- Lisa Oppenheim b. 1975 American, photographer. multimedia
- Gina Osterloh, b. 1973, American, photographer
- Adrienne Outlaw, b. 1970, American, sculptor
- Virginia Overton, b. 1971, American, sculptor
- Laura Owens, b. 1970, American, painter
- Gloria Oyarzabal, b. 1971, Spanish, photographer

=== P ===
- Anna Parkina, b. 1979, Russian, multi-disciplinary artist
- Roula Partheniou, b. 1977, Canadian, sculptor
- Marlo Pascual (1972–2020) American, photographer, sculptor
- Amruta Patil, b. 1979, Indian, illustrator
- Jenny Perlin, b. 1970, American, multimedia artist
- Mai-Thu Perret, b. 1976, Swiss, performance artist
- Eileen Perrier, b. 1974, British, photographer
- Vinca Petersen, b. 1973, British, photographer
- Ciara Phillips, b. 1976, Canadian, installation artist
- Amalia Pica, b. 1978, Argentine, multidisciplinary artist
- Sarah Pickering, b. 1972, British, photographer
- Outi Pieski, b. 1973, Finnish, installation artist
- Grytė Pintukaitė, b. 1977, Lithuanian, painter
- Amy Pleasant, b. 1972, American, painter
- Lucy Pullen, b. 1971, Canadian, installation artist
- Melanie Pullen, b. 1975, American, photographer

=== Q ===
- Tazeen Qayyum, b. 1973, Pakistani-Canadian, conceptual artist
- Eileen Quinlan, b. 1972, American, photographer

=== R ===
- Sara Greenberger Rafferty, b. 1978, American, multimedia artist
- Sara Rahbar, b. 1976, Iranian, installation artist
- Nelda Ramos, b. 1977, Argentine, multidisciplinary artist
- Jessica Rankin, b. 1971, American, embroidery
- Barbara Rapp, b. 1972, Austrian, multimedia artist
- Lucy Raven, b. 1977, American, multidisciplinary artist
- Mary Reid Kelley, b. 1979, American, multimedia artist
- Sheilah Wilson ReStack, b. 1975, Canadian, video artist
- Dominique Rey (artist), b. 1976, Canadian, photographer
- Abigail Reynolds (artist), b. 1975, British, collage artist
- Hannah Rickards, b. 1979, British, installation artist
- Amber Robles-Gordon, b. 1977, American, mixed media visual artist
- Favianna Rodriguez, b. 1978, American, interdisciplinary artist
- Rocio Romero, b. 1971, Chilean-American, designer
- Tracey Rose, b. 1974, South African, performance artist
- Pamela Rosenkranz, b. 1979, Swiss, multimedia artist
- Amanda Ross-Ho, b. 1975, American, interdisciplinary artist
- Laurel Roth Hope, b. 1973, American, artist and naturalist
- Mika Rottenberg, b. 1976, Argentine, video artist
- Abbey Ryan, b. 1979, American, painter

=== S ===
- Jenny Sabin, b. 1974, American, architect
- Ruth Sacks, b. 1977, South African, book artist
- Diana Salazar, b. 1972, Mexican, ceramicist
- Shizu Saldamando, b. 1978, American, painter
- Claudia Peña Salinas, b. 1975, mixed media artist
- Virginia San Fratello b. 1971, American, architect, 3D printer
- Zina Saro-Wiwa, b. 1976, Nigerian and British, video artist
- Jenny Saville, b. 1970, British, painter
- Yhonnie Scarce, b. 1973, Australian, glass artist
- Keisha Scarville, b. 1975, American, photographer
- Allison Schulnik, b. 1978, American, painter
- Martina Schumacher, b. 1972, German, painter
- Dana Schutz, b. 1976, American, painter
- Kateřina Šedá, b. 1977, Czech, conceptual artist
- Susan Seubert, b. 1970, American, photographer
- Anna Sew Hoy, b. 1976, New Zealander, sculptor
- Shirana Shahbazi, b. 1974, Iranian, photographer
- Sara Shamma, b. 1975, Syrian, painter
- Tai Shani, b. 1976, British, performance artist
- Amy Sherald, b. 1973, American, painter
- Ranjani Shettar, b. 1977, Indian, sculptor
- Sienna Shields, b. 1976, American, abstract artist
- Jean Shin, b. 1971, American, sculptor
- Jeena Shin, b. 1973, New Zealander, painter
- Heji Shin, b. 1976, German, photographer
- Erin Shirreff, b. 1975, Canadian, sculptor
- Yvonne Shortt, b. 1972, American, installation artist
- Leslie Shows, b. 1977, American, painter
- Anna Shteynshleyger, b. 1977, Russian, photographer
- Amie Siegel, b. 1974, American, video, photography and installation artist
- Sigga Björg Sigurðardóttir, b. 1977, Icelandic, painter, animator
- Xaviera Simmons, b. 1974, American, multimedia artist
- Taryn Simon, b. 1975, American, conceptual artist
- Jana Šindelová, b. 1970, Czech, printmaker
- Brooke Singer, b. 1972, American, media artist
- Lucy Skaer, b. 1975, Scottish, sculptor
- Sonya Sklaroff, b. 1970, American, painter
- Veronica Smirnoff, b. 1979, British, painter
- Allison Smith (artist), b. 1972, American, sculptor
- Alejandra González Soca, b. 1973, Uruguayan, sculptor
- Rachelle Mozman Solano, b. 1972, American, photographer
- Jen Sorensen, b. 1974, American, cartoonist and illustrator
- Linda Sormin b. 1971, Canadian, ceramics, sculpture
- Monika Sosnowska, b. 1972, Polish, installation artist
- Meredyth Sparks, b. 1972, American, multimedia artist
- Emily Speed, b. 1979, British, installation and performance artist
- Raphaella Spence, b. 1978, British, painter
- Loredana Sperini, b. 1970, Swiss, sculptor
- Molly Springfield, b. 1977, American, drawer
- Hannah Starkey, b. 1971, British, photographer
- Despina Stokou, b. 1978, Greek, painter
- Clare Strand, b. 1973, British, photographer
- Corin Sworn, b. 1976, British, multidisciplinary visual artist
- Stephanie Syjuco, b. 1974, Filipino-American, conceptual artist

=== T ===
- Taravat Talepasand, b. 1979, American, painter and sculptor
- Ronika Tandi, b. 1975, Zimbabwean, sculptor
- Latai Taumoepeau, b. 1972, Australian, performance artist
- Alison Elizabeth Taylor, b. 1972, American, woodworker
- Josephine Taylor, b. 1977, American, painter
- Saffronn Te Ratana, b. 1975, New Zealander, painter
- Althea Thauberger, b. 1970, Canadian, photographer
- Mickalene Thomas, b. 1971, American, painter
- Ann Toebbe, b. 1974, American, painter
- Faye Toogood b. 1977, British designer
- Clarissa Tossin, b. 1973, Brazilian, sculptor
- Janaina Tschäpe, b. 1973, German, multimedia artist
- Salla Tykkä, b. 1973, Finnish, video artist

=== U ===
- Hema Upadhyay, 1972–2015, Indian, installation artist
- Francis Upritchard, b. 1976, New Zealander, sculptor
- Kaari Upson, 1970–2021, American, mixed media visual artist
- Hana Usui, b. 1974, Japanese, painter
- Camille Utterback, b. 1970, American, installation artist

=== V ===
- Joana Vasconcelos, b. 1971, Portuguese, installation artist
- Eva Vermandel, b. 1974, Belgian, photographer
- Charlene Vickers, b. 1970, Canadian, painter
- Fernanda Viégas, b. 1971, Brazilian, information artist
- Karlien de Villiers, b. 1975, South African, comics artist
- Marianne Vitale, b. 1973, American, installation artist
- Olga Volchkova, b. 1970, American, painter
- Anna Von Mertens, b. 1973, American, textile artist

=== W ===
- Sophia Wallace, b. 1978, American, conceptual artist
- Patricia Watwood, b. 1971, American, painter
- Julie Weitz, b. 1979, American, installation artist
- Kaethe Katrin Wenzel, b. 1972, German, conceptual artist
- Nicole Wermers, b. 1971, German, performance artist
- Megan Whitmarsh, b. 1972, American, textile artist
- Tania Willard, b. 1977, Canadian, multidisciplinary artist
- Paula Wilson, b. 1975, American, mixed media visual artist
- Nicole Wittenberg, b. 1979, American, painter
- Clare Woods, b. 1972, British, installation artist
- Saya Woolfalk, b. 1979, American, multimedia artist
- Janis Mars Wunderlich, b. 1970, American, ceramicist
- Gesche Würfel, b. 1976, German, photographer

=== Y ===
- Anusha Yadav, b. 1975, Indian, photographer
- Myriam Yates, b. 1971, Canadian, photographer
- Anicka Yi, b. 1971, Korean, conceptual artist
- Lynette Yiadom-Boakye, b. 1977, British, painter
- Maria Yoon, b. 1971, Korean, performance artist
- Brenna Youngblood, b. 1979, American, mixed media visual artist
- Jinny Yu, b. 1976, Canadian, painter

=== Z ===
- Carla Zaccagnini, b. 1973, Brazilian, multidisciplinary artist
- Valeria Zalaquett, b. 1971, Chilean, photographer
- Billie Zangewa, b. 1973, Malawian, fabric artist
- Joanna Zastróżna, b. 1972, Polish, photographer
- Abby Moon Zeciroski, b. 1973, American, mixed media artist
- Pippi Zornoza, b. 1978, American, interdisciplinary artist
- Molly Zuckerman-Hartung, b. 1975, American, painter

== 1980–1989 ==
=== A ===
- Zarouhie Abdalian, b. 1982, American, installation artist
- Nina Chanel Abney, b. 1982, American, painter
- Laia Abril, b. 1986, Spanish, photographer
- Sarah Al Abdali, b. 1989, Saudi Arabian, street artist
- Amelia Alcock-White, b. 1981, Canadian, painter
- Diana al-Hadid, b. 1981, American, sculptor
- Morehshin Allahyari, b. 1985, Iranian, 3D printing artist
- Lisa Alvarado, b. 1982, American, visual artist and harmonium player
- Heba Amin, b. 1980, Egyptian, multidisciplinary artist
- Natalia Anciso, b. 1985, American, visual art, installation art
- Katrina Andry, b. 1981, American, printmaker
- Jaime Angelopoulos, b. 1982, Canadian, sculptor
- Antigirl, 1984, American, multidisciplinary artist and graphic designer
- Naama Arad, b. 1985, Israeli, sculptor
- Carmen Argote, b. 1981, American, performance art and sculpture
- Beth Diane Armstrong, b. 1985, South African, sculptor
- Morgan Asoyuf, b. 1984, Canadian, jewelry maker
- Dana Awartani, b. 1987, Saudi, mosaic artist
- Manon Awst, b. 1983, Welsh, sculptor

=== B ===
- Firelei Báez, b. 1981, American (b. Dominican Republic), visual artist
- Trisha Baga, b. 1985, American, visual art, installation art
- Pénélope Bagieu, b. 1982, French, Illustrator
- Bianca Bagnarelli, b. 1988, Italian, illustrator
- Olga Balema, b. 1984, Ukrainian, sculptor
- Natalie Ball, b. 1980, American, multidisciplinary artist
- Ana Teresa Barboza, b. 1981, Peruvian, textile artist
- Leslie Barlow, b. 1989, American, painter
- Math Bass, b. 1981, American, multidisciplinary artist
- Ayah Bdeir, b. 1982, Canadian, interactive artist
- Endia Beal, b. 1985, American, visual artist, curator
- Alexandra Bell, b. 1983, American, multidisciplinary artist
- Genevieve Belleveau, b. 1984, American, performance artist and singer
- Meriem Bennani, b. 1988, Moroccan, video artist
- Trudy Benson, b. 1985, American, painter
- María Berrío, b. 1982, Colombian, paper artist
- Hannah Black, b. 1981, British, video artist
- Dineo Seshee Bopape, b. 1981, South African, multimedia artist
- Sascha Braunig, b. 1983, Canadian, painter
- Dina Brodsky, b. 1981, American, painter
- LaKela Brown, b. 1982, American, sculptor
- Lex Brown (artist), b. 1989, American, performance artist
- Fatma Bucak, b. 1984, Turkish, artist and photographer

=== C ===
- Marina Camargo, b. 1980, Brazilian, multimedia artist
- Elaine Cameron-Weir, b. 1985, Canadian, sculptor
- Jacynthe Carrier, b. 1982, Canadian, photographer
- Jordan Casteel, b. 1989, American, painter
- Caitlin Cherry, b. 1987, American, painter, sculptor, educator
- Talia Chetrit, b. 1982, American, photographer
- Genevieve Chua, b. 1984, Singapore, painter
- Liz Climo, b. 1981, American, illustrator, animator
- Bethany Collins, b. 1984, American, book artist
- Stephanie Comilang, b. 1980, Canadian, video artist
- Megan Cope, b. 1982, Australian, multidisciplinary artist
- Yvette Coppersmith, b. 1980, Australian, painter
- Adriana Corral, b. 1983, American, installation, performance, and sculpture
- Petra Cortright, b. 1986, American, video, painting, and digital media
- Lucy Cox (artist), b. 1988, British, painter
- Njideka Akunyili Crosby, b. 1983, Nigerian, painter
- Rosson Crow, b. 1982, American, painter

=== D ===
- Sabita Dangol, b. 1984, Nepalese, visual artist
- Dina Danish, b. 1981, Egyptian, conceptual artist
- Gohar Dashti, b. 1980, Iranian, photographer
- Kenturah Davis, b. 1984, American, multimedia artist
- Heather Day, b. 1989, American, painter
- Erika DeFreitas, b. 1980, Canadian, multidisciplinary artist
- Abigail DeVille, b. 1981, American, sculptor
- Heather Dewey-Hagborg, b. 1982, American, information artist
- Francesca DiMattio, b. 1981, American, painter, ceramicist
- Chhan Dina, b. 1984, Cambodian, painter
- Debbie Ding, b. 1984, Singapore, multimedia artist
- Lucy Dodd, b. 1981, American, painter, installation artist
- Eliza Douglas, b. 1984, American, painter
- Amanda Dunbar, b. 1982, American, painter

=== E ===
- Alicia Eggert, 1981, American, interdisciplinary artist
- Cécile B. Evans, 1983, Belgian-American, multimedia artist

=== F ===
- Modupeola Fadugba, b. 1985, Nigeria, installation artist
- Tatyana Fazlalizadeh, b. 1985, American, painter
- Amy Feldman, b. 1981, American, painter
- Ana Teresa Fernández, b. 1980, Mexican, painter
- Selina Foote, b. 1985, New Zealander, painter
- Nina Mae Fowler, b. 1981, British, photographer
- Natalie Frank, b 1980, American, painter
- Jo Fraser, b. 1986, British, painter
- LaToya Ruby Frazier, b. 1982, American, photographer

=== G ===
- Nikita Gale, b. 1983, American, visual artist
- Doreen Garner, b. 1986, American, sculptor
- Opashona Ghosh, b. 1987, Indian, illustrator
- Karine Giboulo, b. 1980, Canadian, sculptor
- Alexandra Daisy Ginsberg, b. 1982, British, digital artist
- Sarah Beth Goncarova, b. 1980, American, sculptor
- Noémie Goudal, b. 1984, French, photographer
- Alonsa Guevara, b. 1986, Chilean-American, painter
- Martine Gutierrez, b. 1989, American, visual and performance artist

=== H ===
- Lauren Halsey, b. 1987, American, installation artist
- Josephine Halvorson, b. 1981, American, painter
- Rana Hamadeh, b. 1983, Lebanese, installation artist
- Han Yajuan, b. 1980, Chinese, painter
- Charlotte Harris, b. 1980, British, painter
- Vashti Harrison, b. 1988, American, writer, illustrator and filmmaker
- Libby Heaney, b. 1983, British, technology artist
- Lena Henke, b. 1982, German, sculptor
- Emily Hesse, b. 1980, British, multidisciplinary visual artist
- Shara Hughes, b. 1981, American, painter
- Marguerite Humeau, 1986, French, sculptor

=== J ===
- Tomashi Jackson, b. 1980, American, multimedia artist
- Pauline Curnier Jardin, b. 1980, French, video artist
- Mercedes Jelinek b. 1985, American, photographer
- Steffani Jemison, b. 1981, American, multimedia artist
- Adela Jušić, b. 1982, Bosnian, installation artist

=== K ===
- Lauren Kalman, b. 1980, American, visual artist
- Amy Karle, b. 1980, American, sculptor
- Katarzyna Karpowicz, b. 1985, Polish, painter
- Tomoko Kashiki, b. 1982, Japanese, painter
- Mari Katayama, b. 1987, Japanese, multi-disciplinary artist
- Caitlin Keogh, b. 1982, American, painter
- Hayv Kahraman, b. 1982, Iraqi-American, painter
- Christine Sun Kim, b. 1980, American, sound artist
- Anna King (artist), b. 1984, Scottish, painter
- Kacie Kinzer, b. 1982, American, interactive artist
- Vera Klute, b. 1981, German, multi-disciplinary artist
- Nahoko Kojima, b. 1981, Japanese, paper artist
- Olya Kroytor, b. 1986, Russian, performance artist
- Julia Kwon b. 1987, American, fiber artist

=== L ===
- Jenni Laiti, b. 1981, Finnish, performance artist
- Carolyn Lazard, 1987, American, multimedia artist
- Alexandra Lethbridge, b. 1987, born in Hong Kong and based in the UK, photographer
- Ann Lewis (artist), b. 1981, American, multidisciplinary activist artist
- Linda Nguyen Lopez b. 1981, American, ceramicist
- Gretta Louw, b. 1981, Australian, multidisciplinary artist

=== M ===
- Lauren Mabry b. 1985, American, ceramicist
- Tala Madani, b. 1981, Iranian, painter
- Aida Mahmudova, b. 1982, Azerbaijani, painter
- Ato Malinda, b. 1981, Kenyan, performance artist
- Jen Mann, b. 1987, Canadian, painter
- Kathryn Maple, b. 1989, British painter
- Helen Marten, b. 1985, British, sculptor and installation artist
- Shantell Martin, b. 1980, British, drawer
- Saba Masoumian, 1982, Iranian, sculptor
- Park McArthur, b. 1984, American, multimedia artist
- Klea McKenna, 1980, American, photographer
- Meryl McMaster, b. 1988, Canadian, photographer
- Alexa Meade, b. 1986, American, painter
- Christien Meindertsma, b. 1980, Dutch, multimedia artist
- Rosa Menkman, b. 1983, Dutch, data artist
- Caroline Mesquita, b. 1989, French, sculptor
- Alice Miceli, b. 1980, Brazilian, photographer
- Nicole Miller (artist), b. 1982, American, installation artist
- Olia Mishchenko, b. 1980, Canadian, drawer
- Nandipha Mntambo, b. 1982, South African, sculptor
- Adeline de Monseignat, b. 1987, Dutch-Monagesque, sculptor
- Polly Morgan (taxidermist), b. 1980, British, taxidermist
- Juno Morrow, b. 1986, American, multidisciplinary artist
- Jill Mulleady, b. 1980, Uruguayan, painter
- Brenna Murphy, b. 1986, American, multimedia artist
- Nontsikelelo Mutiti, b. 1982, Zimbabwean, graphic designer

=== N ===
- Alexandra Nechita, b. 1985, Romanian-American, painter
- Polly Nor, b. 1989, British, illustrator
- Anahita Norouzi, b. 1988, Iranian-Canadian artist
- Katja Novitskova, b. 1984, Estonian, installation artist

=== O ===
- Christy Oates, 1980, American, woodworker
- Toyin Ojih Odutola, b. 1985, Nigerian-American, painter
- Temitayo Ogunbiyi, b. 1984, American, sculptor
- Valentina Guidi Ottobri (artist) b. 1988, Italian, artist, curator

=== P ===
- Kit Paulson b. 1981, glass artist
- Sara Pichelli, b. 1983, Italian, illustrator
- Hayal Pozanti, b. 1983, Turkish, painter
- Nathlie Provosty, b. 1981, American, painter
- Puppies Puppies, b. 1989, American, performance artist

=== Q ===
- Nathalie Quagliotto, b. 1984, Canadian, sculptor
- Christina Quarles, b. 1985, American, painter

=== R ===
- Mary Ramsden, b. 1984, British, painter
- Romina Ressia, b. 1981, Argentine, photographer
- Anna Ridler, b. 1985, British, artificial intelligence artist
- Mélanie Rocan, b. 1980, Canadian, painter
- Adele Röder, b. 1980, German, painter
- Sonia Romero, b. 1980, American, muralist and printmaker
- Julia Rommel, b. 1980, American, painter
- Harmonia Rosales, b. 1984, American, painter
- Sheena Rose, b. 1985, Barbadian, multidisciplinary artist
- Rachel Rose (artist), b. 1986, American, visual artist
- Anastasia Ryabova, b. 1985, Russian, installation artist

=== S ===
- Analia Saban, b. 1980, Argentine, conceptual artist
- Aki Sasamoto, 1980, Japanese, installation artist
- Erin Schaff, b. 1989, American, photographer
- Hiba Schahbaz, b. 1981, Pakistani-American, painter
- Stacy Jo Scott, b. 1981, American, ceramicist
- Davina Semo, b. 1981, American, sculptor
- Indrė Šerpytytė, b. 1983, Lithuanian, photographer
- Fatma Shanan, b. 1986, Israeli, painter
- Jessica Rosemary Shepherd, b. 1984, British, botanical artist
- Claire Sherman, b. 1981, American, painter
- Janine Shroff, b. 1983, Indian, illustrator
- Mary Sibande, b. 1982, South African, multi-disciplinary artist
- Pola Sieverding, b. 1981, German, photographer
- Aram Han Sifuentes b. 1986 Korean American, fiber artist
- Madiha Sikander, b. 1987, Pakistani, multimedia artist
- Kseniya Simonova, b. 1985, Ukrainian, sand artist
- Buhlebezwe Siwani, b. 1987, South African, multi-disciplinary artist
- Tuesday Smillie, b. 1981, American, interdisciplinary artist
- Amy Sol, b. 1981, American, painter
- Yulia Spiridonova, b. 1986, Russian, photographer
- Jen Stark, b. 1983, American, multimedia artist
- Hannah Stouffer, b. 1981, American, illustrator
- Maya Stovall, b. 1982, American, conceptual artist
- Elke Reva Sudin, b. 1987, American, painter
- April Surgent b. 1982, American, glass engraver
- Ilona Szwarc b. 1984, Polish, photographer

=== T ===
- Claire Tabouret, b. 1981, French, painter
- Rhiannon Skye Tafoya b. 1989, American, multidisciplinary artist
- Jillian Tamaki, b. 1980, Canadian, illustrator
- Gabrielle Laïla Tittley, b. 1988, Canadian, multidisciplinary artist
- Alessandra Torres, b. 1980, American, sculptor
- Ka-Man Tse, b. 1981, American, photographer
- MJ Tyson, b. 1986, American, jewelry designer

=== V ===
- Laurence Vallières, b. 1986, Canadian, sculptor
- Sam Vernon, b. 1987, American, installation artist
- Lina Iris Viktor, b. 1987, British, video artist
- Natacha Voliakovsky, b. 1988, Argentine, performance artist

=== W ===
- Addie Wagenknecht, b. 1981, American, interactive artist
- Ericka Walker, b. 1981, American, printmaker
- Stacey Lee Webber, b. 1982, American, metalsmith
- Mia Florentine Weiss, b. 1980, German, performance artist
- Ambera Wellmann, b. 1982, Canadian, painter
- Elsa Werth, b. 1985, French, multidisciplinary artist
- Liz West, b. 1985, British, installation artist
- Carmen Winant, b. 1983, American, multimedia artist
- Anne Wölk, b. 1982, German, painter
- Bethan Laura Wood, b. 1983, British, designer
- Agustina Woodgate, 1981, Argentine, installation artist

=== Y ===
- Sarah Yates, b. 1987, British, muralist
- Pinar Yolaçan, 1981, Turkish, garment artist

=== Z ===
- Amina Zoubir, b. 1983, Algerian, multidisciplinary artist
- Sarah Zucker, b. 1985, American, multimedia artist

== 1990–1999 ==
- Akiane, b. 1994, American, painter
- Marina Amaral, b. 1994, Brazilian, photographer
- Asinnajaq, b. 1991, Canadian, video artist
- Olivia Bee, b. 1994, American, photographer
- Aria Dean, b. 1993, American, artist, critic, and curator
- Jadé Fadojutimi, b. 1993, British, painter
- Basmah Felemban, b. 1993, Saudi Arabian graphic designer
- Ilana Harris-Babou, b. 1991, American, sculptor and installation artist
- Jess Valice, b. 1996, American, painter
- Kudzanai-Violet Hwami, b. 1993, Zimbabwean, painter
- Acacia Johnson, b. 1990, American, photographer
- Tau Lewis, b. 1993, Canadian, sculptor
- Olivia Locher, b. 1990, American, photographer
- Deena Mohamed, b. 1995, Egyptian, graphic artist
- Sethembile Msezane, b. 1991, South African, multi-disciplinary artist
- Samera Paz, b. 1994, American, photographer
- Maria Qamar, b. 1991, Canadian, painter
- Daisy Quezada Ureña, b. 1990, American, ceramic and fabric artist
- Harriet Riddell, b. 1990, British, textile artist
- Tschabalala Self, b. 1990, American, mixed media visual artist
- Emelina Soares, b. 1993, Indian, installation artist
- Sheida Soleimani, b. 1990, Iranian-American, photographer
- Chanell Stone, b. 1992, American, photographer
- Malina Suliman, b. 1990, Afghan, multidisciplinary artist
- Minna Sundberg, b. 1990, Swedish, illustrator
- Chern'ee Sutton, b. 1996, Australian, painter
- Maggie Thompson (artist), b. 1990, American, textile artist
- Rachel Wolfe-Goldsmith, b. 1991, American, muralist
- Zeinixx, b. 1990, Senegalese, graffiti artist

== 2000–2009 ==
- Autumn de Forest, 2001, American, painter
- Alicja Kozłowska, 2000, Polish, textile artist

== See also ==
- Women artists
- Women in photography
- List of women photographers
