= Magazine and History =

1983 painting by Andy Warhol

- Artist: Andy Warhol
- Year: 1983

Magazine and History is a 4.3-meter-high painting by Andy Warhol completed in 1983 and part of the Hubert Burda Media collection.

It represent 25 covers of Bunte Magazine, a German weekly magazine that covers celebrity, gossip, news, and lifestyle matters.

Hubert Burda, owner of Bunte and Hubert Burda Media commissioned Warhol to create the artwork for the inauguration of the new offices of Bunte in Munich Arabellapark. The inauguration took place on December 4, 1983 in presence of Andy Warhol.

Hubert Burda had visited Warhol in New York City and commissioned him with several portraits. He was impressed by his approach and his magazine Interview founded in 1969. It inspired him to modernize the format of Bunte magazine.

In this print, each magazine cover is represented in a different color, acting as individual tesserae forming a different sort of multi-colored mosaic.

The painting was exhibited at the Museum of Urban and Contemporary Art (MUCA) of Munich in Die BUNTE Art exhibition in June 2018. Along Andy Warhol artwork, the exhibition included contemporary artists and photographers: Mirko Borsche, Carsten Fock, Roger Fritz, Hell Gette, Michael von Hassel, Olaf Nicolai, Anselm Reyle, Benjamin Roeder, Stefan Strumbel, Laurence de Valmy, Mia Florentine Weiss and Wolfgang Wilde.
