= Anna Shteynshleyger =

Russian-American photographer

Anna Shteynshleyger (born 1977) is a Russian-American photographer.

== Early life and education ==
Born in Moscow, she moved with her family to Maryland in 1992 at age 15. She began taking photos not long after arriving in the United States, when she received a camera as a gift. She is part of Orthodox Judaism. She holds a BFA degree from the Maryland Institute College of Art, awarded 1999, and an MFA degree from Yale University, awarded in 2001.

== Career ==
In 2009 she was a fellow of the John Simon Guggenheim Foundation.

Her work is included in the collections of the Museum of Fine Arts Houston and the Museum of Contemporary Photography, Chicago.
