= Basmah Felemban =

Saudi Arabian graphic artist

Basmah Felemban (Arabic: بسمة فلمبان; born 1993) is a Saudi Arabian, self-taught graphic designer. She has an interest in symbolism and Islamic metaphysics.

== Biography ==
Felemban was born and raised in Jeddah, Saudi Arabia.

In 2017, Felemban graduated with an MA in Islamic and Traditional Art from The Prince's School of Traditional Arts. She was able to start the masters course, without a bachelor's degree, based on her portfolio and research in her field.

== Career ==
After graduating from high school, Felemban worked at a startup company as a designer. It was there that she was encouraged to participate in an art competition run by Crossway Foundation. Felemban entered the competition and made her first artwork Jeem, which won her third place. In 2011, Felemban founded Saudi Street Art, a submissions-based Tumblr blog. In 2012 Basmah Felemban's first work Jeem was exhibited at the British Museum. She went on to curate two street art exhibitions with other creatives: “Inner Voices” (2014) and “The Waves Won’t Stop When You Leave” (2019) showcased in Al-Balad, Jeddah. Basmah Felemban's work is mainly inspired by Islamic calligraphy (the Potala style), and she gives the work a new artistic form, featuring a rotating mechanism.

== Awards ==
2014 - "Young Talent" award at The Arab Women Awards.

== Exhibitions ==
Group exhibitions:

- Hajj: Journey to the Heart of Islam, British Museum, London, England (2012)
- A Line in the Sand, Artspace, Dubai, UAE (2013)
- Show of Faith, Katara, Doha, Qatar (2013)
- Transformation: Geometry in Motion, Maraya Center, Sharjah, UAE (2013)
- Rhizoma: 55th Venice Biennale, Magazzini del Sale, Venice, Italy (2013)
- The Language of Human Consciousness, Athr Gallery, Jeddah, Saudi Arabia (2014)
- Anonymous: Was a Woman, Hafez Gallery, Jeddah, Saudi Arabia (2015)
- WORLDBUILDING: Gaming and Art in the Digital Age, Julia Stoschek Collection, Düsseldorf, Germany (2022)
