= Vaughn Bell =

American Environmental Artist

Vaughn Bell (born 1978, Syracuse, New York) is an artist primarily working in ecological art, sculpture, installation, environmental art and public art. She is known for her "Village Greens" art installations with living plants, which have been shown in museums and other venues internationally. Bell is also recognized for her public art projects included in collections such as the City of Seattle Public Art Collection and Washington State Arts Commission Collection. Bell lives and works in Seattle, Washington and works on art projects around the world.

== Work ==
External videos
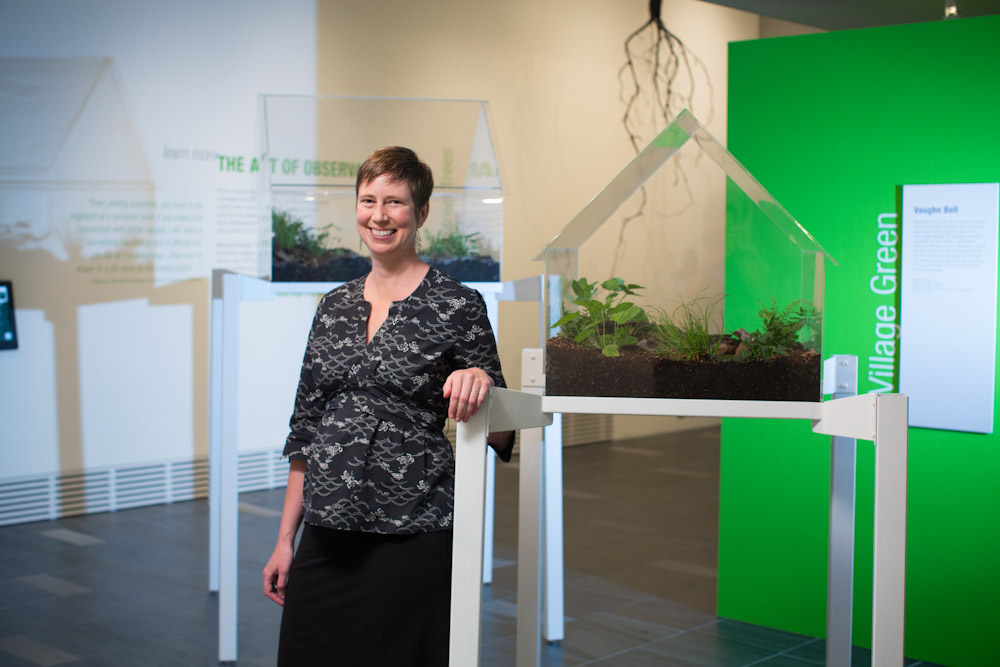
- Vaughn Bell, “The experience of a piece is actually your viewpoint when you're inside it”, Science History Institute

Vaughn Bell creates socially engaged art projects that influence how humans relate to their environment. She is focused on creating "convivial spaces" in which people can experience a symbiotic connection to their local ecologies.

Vaughn Bell's ongoing "Village Greens" series has included projects at venues ranging from Musee Brugge and Kunsthaus Zurich, to the Discovery Center at the Gates Foundation. Her commissions also include installations at the Massachusetts Museum of Contemporary Art, the Edith Russ Site for New Media Art in Oldenburg, Germany, the Owens Walter E. Terhune Art Gallery in Ohio, the Schuylkill Center for Environmental Education and the Chemical Heritage Foundation in Philadelphia, PA.

Vaughn Bell's earlier works often use performance and humor to point to paradoxical ways humans relate to other species. Bell has also explored the boundaries between plants and people by making plants a part of wearable clothing, and caring for them like pets.

Bell has extensive experience in the field of public art, focusing on water and transportation infrastructure. Bell has been employed as a “staff artist” by the Seattle Department of Transportation (SDOT), working on arts planning and integrating design enhancements into public projects such as trails, sidewalks, and bridges. She wrote a Public Art Master Plan for Seattle Public Utilties Drainage and Wastewater. Bell has also served as Lead Artist on the Ship Canal Water Quality Project in Seattle. Bell worked with King County Rainscapes to create a rain garden art guide and a sculptural rain garden art installation.

In 2021, Bell created "Plantscapes" at Kew Royal Botanic Garden, a series of large-scale sculptural installations created in collaboration with horticulturalists. "Plantscapes" was an artwork that brought people and plants up close.

Bell's work has been featured in Artnews, Afterimage, and Arcade Journal, among others. Her work is also included in The New Earthwork: Art Action Agency, from ISC Press and Art and Ecology Now by Andrew Brown from Thames and Hudson

== Selected Environmental Artworks ==
Image	Title	Date(s)	Location
	Plantscapes	2021	Kew Royal Botanic Gardens, London, UK
	All the Rivers in the World	2019	University of Washington, Tacoma, WA
	Path of Water / Percorso d'acqua	2017	Hermitage of San Bartolomeo, Legio, Abruzzo, Italy
	Mossuments	2013	Jordan Woods Natural Area, Beaverton OR
	Metropolis	2012	Seattle Center, Seattle, WA; Seattle Center Foundation
	Again, Life Becomes a River	2007	Kamiyama, Japan
