= Kaethe Katrin Wenzel =

German artist (born 1972)

Kaethe Wenzel
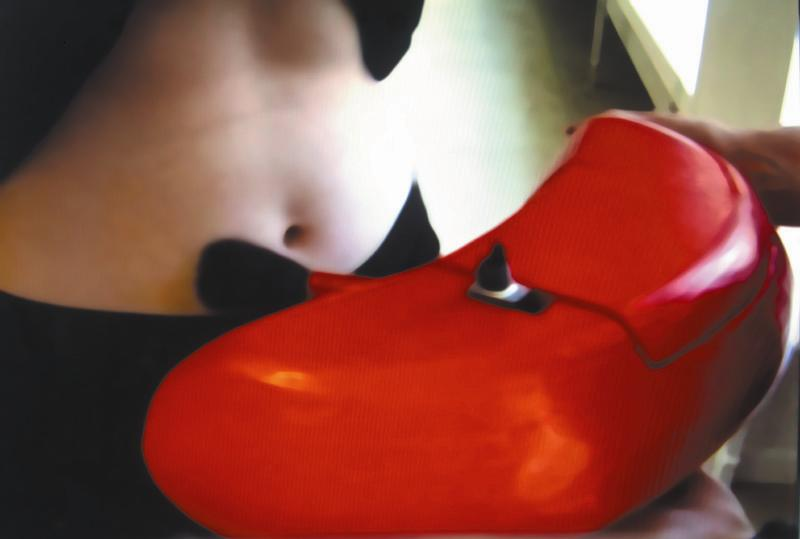
- Kaethe Wenzel (with Lisa Glauer): Egostroking Machine, 2007
- Born: 1972; Aachen, Germany
- Known for: Urban and participatory art

Kaethe Katrin Wenzel (born 1972 in Aachen) is a German artist. Her works are about Utopian ideas, the future, and alternative concepts for society. Her main instruments are drawing, interviews, the Internet, mechanics/electronics, and street art. She uses techniques from surveys to speculative fiction to explore "the collective production of culture, the interface of art and science, and the production and negotiation of public space".

She modifies or mimics urban signs, advertisements, or services, jolting viewers out of their habitual ruts, upsetting conventional ways of seeing and of representing the world. Her interview-based drawing projects connect the streets and the Internet. Her aim is to create space for unusual thoughts and empowered communication: "The point is to rewrite existing structures as alterable, to change and rethink them (...) Through a collective work process (Wenzel) opens up new perspectives and visions of specific themes."

== Life and works ==
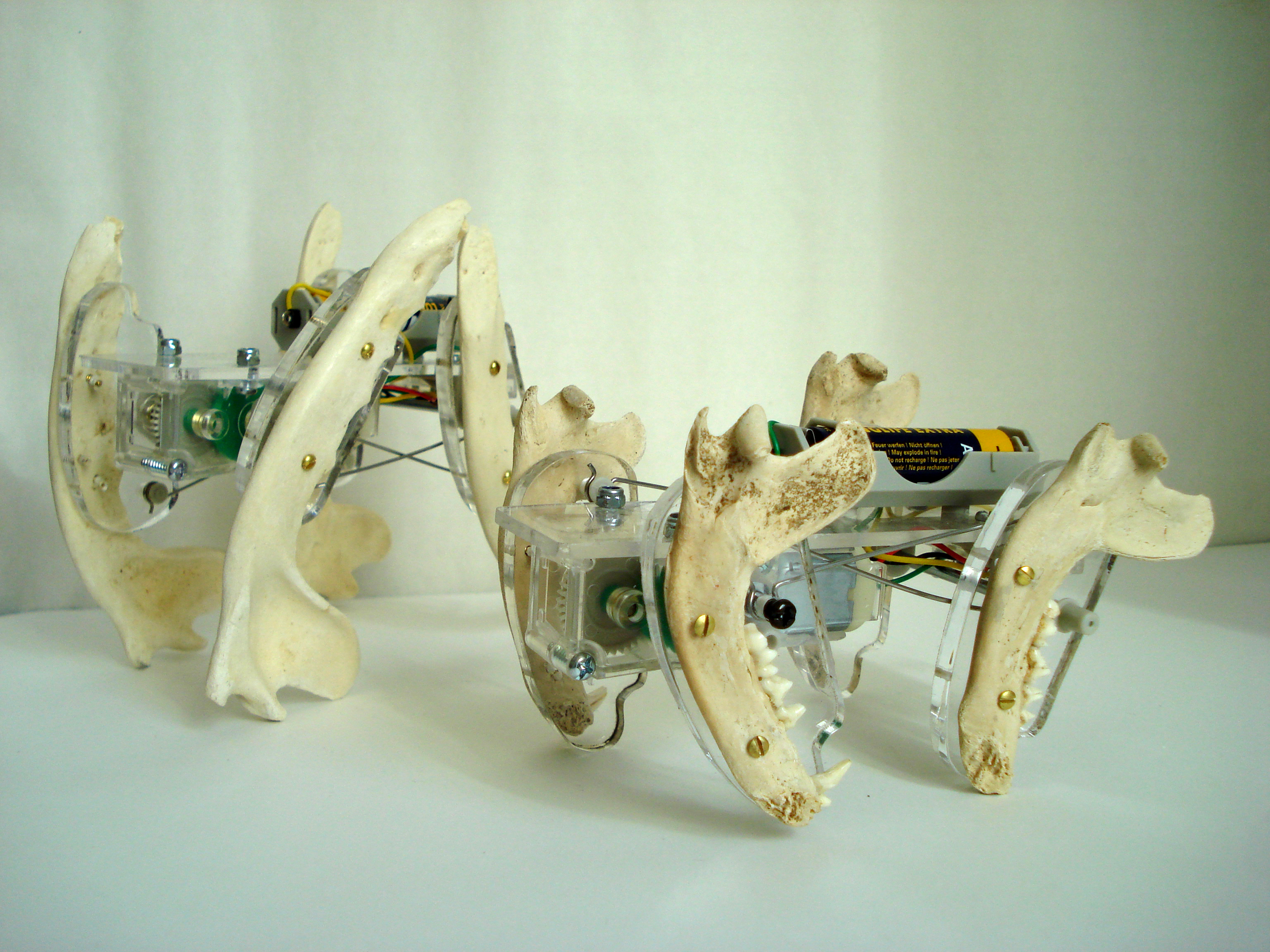
Käthe Wenzel: Bonebots, 2010

In 2016, Wenzel became professor for Aesthetic Practice and Contexts at European University Flensburg. She studied in Marburg, Florence, and Berlin. In 2003 she received a PhD for her work "Meat as a Material in Art. Objects on the Interface of Art and Medicine" about oppositional artistic structures in the German Democratic Republic (GDR).

She was an exchange scholar with the Fulbright Program. In a direct reaction to her time in New York City she developed the Cartoonorama project, which combines drawing, interview, and cartography.

Her art can be found in museums and collections including the German Museum of Technology Berlin; the Szént István Király Múzeum, Székesfehérvár, Hungary; the Koblenz Middlerhine Museum, and the Roemer-Pelizaeus-Museum in Hildesheim.

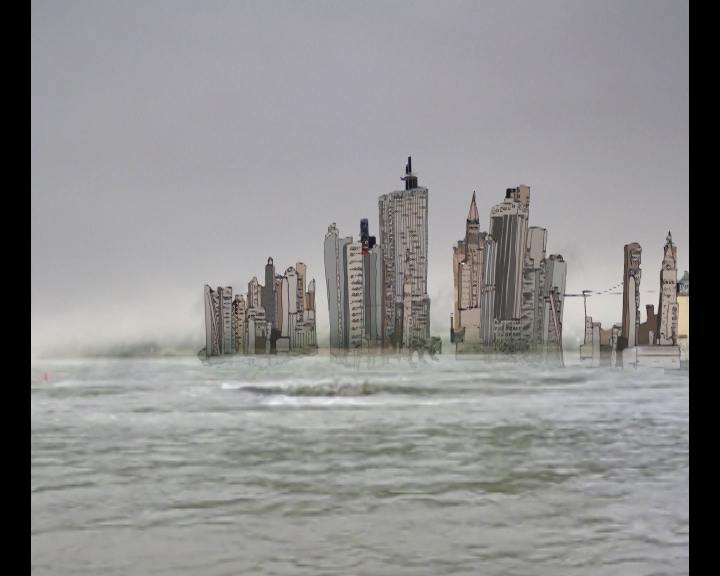
Kaethe Wenzel: Future M, Still, 2016

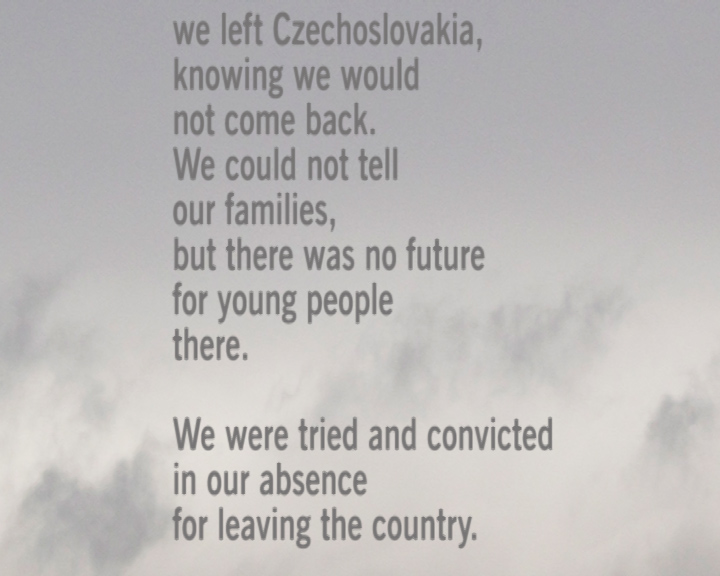
Käthe Wenzel: Future M, Still, 2016

== Publications ==
- Kaethe Wenzel: Parallelgesellschaft Utopia – Last Exit Utopia. Catalog. Schoeppingen, Berlin 2015, ISBN 978-3-00-050545-4.
- Ellen Kobe, Marvin Altner (Eds.): "Neue Kunst in den Neuen Kammern." Foundation Prussian Palaces and Gardens, Jovis, Berlin 2008. ISBN 978-3-86859-030-2.
- Wolfgang Knapp, Cornelius Froemmel, Thomas Schnalke, Kaethe Wenzel (eds.): missing link – Kunst trifft Biomedizin. Public understanding of art and sciences – art meets biomedicine. Catalog about the exhibition at the Museum of Medical History at the Charité, Berlin. University of the Arts, Berlin 2008, ISBN 3-89462-133-8.
- Lisa Glauer, Tatjana Fell, Käthe Wenzel: A decisive Part is missing. Negotiations between art and sciences. Mensch & Buch, Berlin 2008, ISBN 978-3866643581.
