= Loredana Sperini =

Swiss artist

Loredana Sperini (born 1970) is a Swiss artist who works in the areas of sculpture, drawing, installation art and painting. Sperinini is particularly known for her sculpture works that use wax castings applied to a variety of surfaces.

Sperinini was born in Wattwil, Switzerland. Her work is included in the collections of the Museum of Modern Art, New York and the Migros Museum für Gegenwartskunst.
