= Eileen Perrier =

British photographer (born 1974)

- Born: 1974 (age 51–52); London, England
- Education: Surrey Institute of Art & Design, University College; Royal College of Art
- Occupation: Portrait photographer
- Website: www.eileenperrier.com

Eileen Perrier (born 1974) is a British portrait photographer, living in London. She has had solo exhibitions at Whitechapel Gallery and The Photographers' Gallery, London. Perrier's work is held in the collections of Tate, Light Work and the Parliament of the United Kingdom.

== Early life and education ==
Perrier was born and raised in London. She is of Ghanaian and Dominican descent. She graduated from Surrey Institute of Art and Design in 1996 and from the Royal College of Art in 2000.

== Life and work ==
"Her practice includes sitters encountered through various strategies; such as their occupation; location or a physical trait."

Perrier was a senior lecturer in Photography between 2005 - 2022 at University of Westminster and is currently an Associate Lecturer at University of the Arts London (UAL). Between 2019 and 2021 Perrier was a board of trustees at The Photographers' Gallery, London.

She lives in London.

== Publications ==
=== Books of work by Perrier ===
- Eileen Perrier: Monograph. London: Autograph ABP, 1997. ISBN 9781899282401.
- Eileen Perrier. Nottingham: Angel Row Gallery, 2003. ISBN 9780905634647. With an essay by Deborah Dean. Exhibition catalogue.

=== Books of work with one other ===
- The Two of Us. London: Autograph, 1999. With Ann-Marie Lequesne. ISBN 978-1899282708.

=== Books with contributions by Perrier ===
- Blink: 100 photographers, 10 curators, 10 writers. New York: Phaidon, 2002. 2004, ISBN 978-0714844589.

== Solo exhibitions ==
- Eileen Perrier: Wentworth Street Studios, Whitechapel Gallery commission, 2009
- Brixton Studio, The Photographers' Gallery, London, 2002

== Collections ==
Perrier's work is held in the following permanent collections:

- Tate, London
- Light Work, Syracuse, New York
- Parliament of the United Kingdom: her photograph of member of parliament Patricia Gibson
