= Liz West =

British visual artist

Liz West (born 1985) is a British visual artist. West's practice comprises site-specific artworks, sculpture, and immersive light art installations. Her artworks often combine colour and light with the aim of heightening sensory awareness and experience for the viewer.

== Biography ==
She graduated from Glasgow School of Art in 2007.

Liz West has exhibited and been commissioned internationally by organisations and institutions including Natural History Museum, National Trust, National Science and Media Museum, Dubai Design Week, and Bristol Biennial.

In 2018 West launched a permanent public commission in London titled 'Colour Transfer'. The site specific sculpture consists of angled coloured mirrors that span the underneath of Paddington Central's Westway Bridge.

West was a finalist for the Aesthetica Art Prize 2016.
