= Jennifer Crupi =

American metalworker (born 1973)

- Born: 1973 (age 52–53); Red Bank, New Jersey
- Occupation: Metalworker

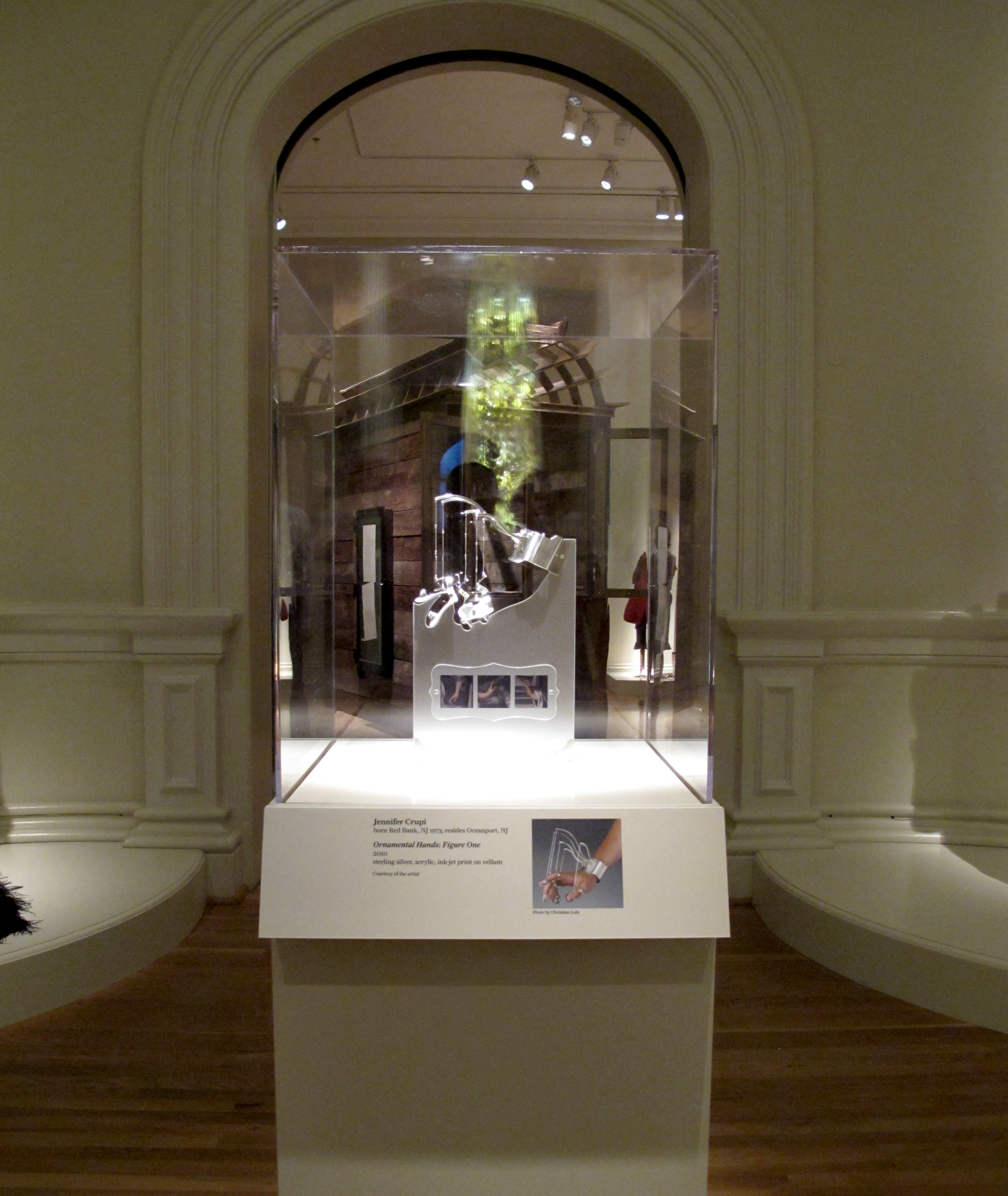
Jennifer Crupi's Ornamental: Hands Figure One on display at the Renwick Gallery of the Smithsonian American Art Museum

Jennifer Crupi (born 1973) is an American metalworker known for her unconventional jewelry.

Crupi was born in Red Bank, New Jersey, and has been active in Oceanport as well. A graduate of the Cooper Union and the State University of New York at New Paltz, she creates jewelry that is designed to distort common gestures made by the human body, and which is influenced by traditional human body language. Much of her work uses sterling silver and aluminum in its construction. Crupi was among the artists featured in the exhibit "40 Under 40: Craft Futures" at the Renwick Gallery of the Smithsonian Museum of American Art, and one of her pieces was subsequently accessioned by the museum. She is on the faculty of Kean University.
