= Kuzana Ogg =

Indian-American painter (born 1971)

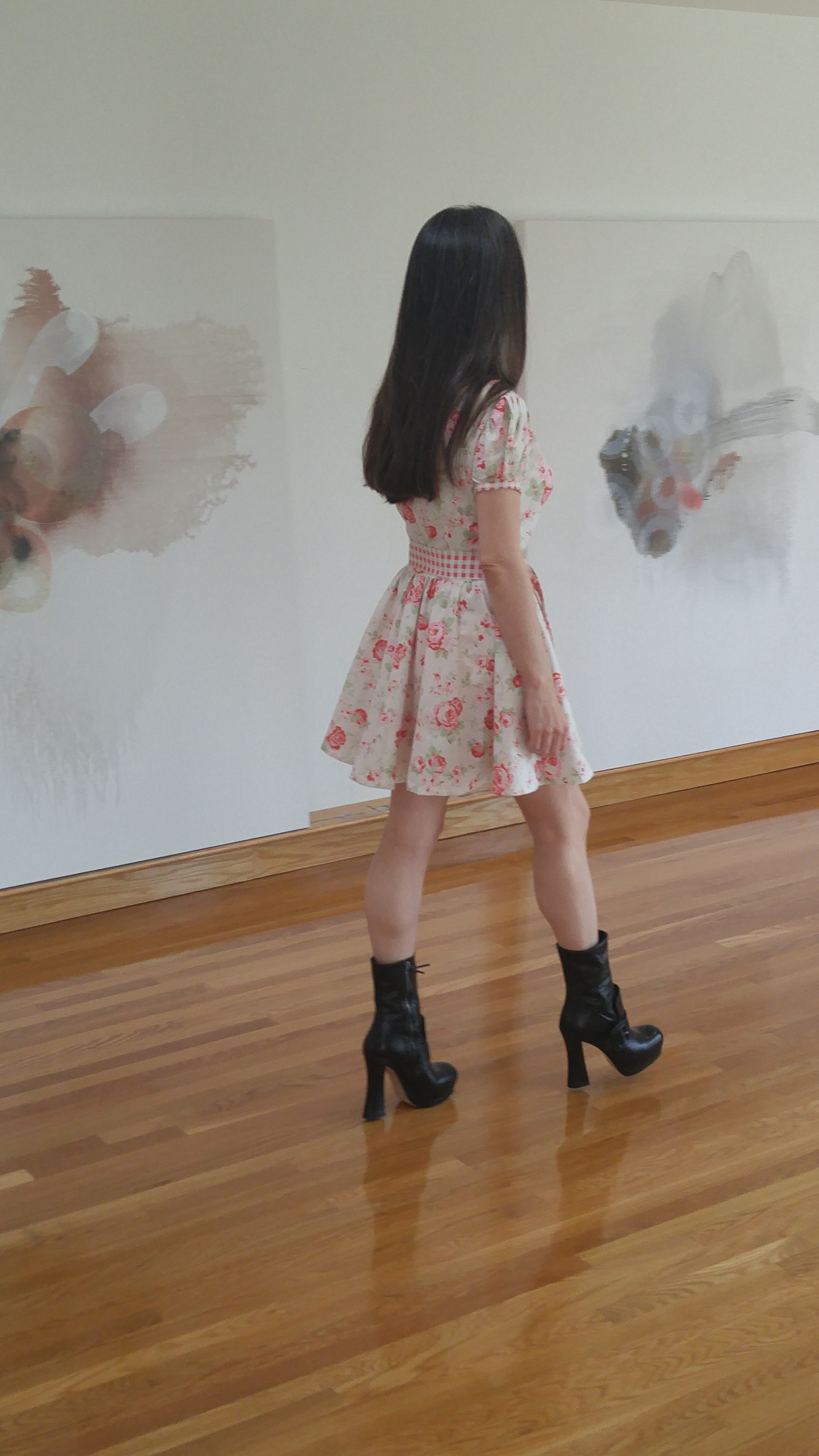
- Kuzana Ogg in a studio, Bakersfield, California, 2015
- Born: Kuzana Pandole; August 31, 1971 (age 55); Bombay, India
- Known for: Painting
- Movement: Abstract
- Website: kuzanaogg.com

Kuzana Ogg (born August 31, 1971) is an Indian-American painter who lives in the United States. Kuzana's first solo museum exhibition was Oil at the San Luis Obispo Museum of Art in 2014. A second solo followed shortly thereafter, Rev Zero at the Bakersfield Museum of Art in 2015.

== Early life and education ==
Kuzana was born in Bombay in 1971. A short while later, Kuzana and her younger sister joined their newly immigrated parents in England. Kuzana's education was in a series of boarding schools; Cornwall and Surrey in England, after that- Kodaikanal in the south of India. At the age of 10, Kuzana and her family moved to New York. Her secondary education was completed at Catholic and public schools. In 1995, she graduated from SUNY Purchase. She spent six years living in Kyung Ju, South Korea; teaching English and learning Korean. She has participated in several residencies, the most recent in Sri Lanka.

== Work ==
Using a tempered and deliberate palette, the "Yasna" paintings point to notions of boundary and organization. In works like “Abanegan” and “Maidyoshahem”, the patterned orbs are easily anthropomorphic, becoming stand-ins for humans. They are each sectioned off, corralled, constricted within a designated area. In many cases, the swelling organic forms spill out beyond their bounds, as if they are outgrowing the space, becoming too large to be confined in such rigid domain. The bulk of Ogg's abstract aesthetic consists of botanical forms, biological entities, urban geometry and bold pattern. Inspired and informed by her early years in India, the controlled tones and forms within her work serve the same purpose as the gardens and trees surrounding her grandparents’ home: to mediate the noise and bustle just beyond them.

Kuzana lives in New Mexico with her husband. Kuzana's work revolves around images both botanical and biological in origin. These forms and colors take on new meaning when juxtaposed as a metaphor for the human experience.

In 2012 her work was featured at LaGrange Art Museum, Georgia, Museum of Fine Arts, Tallahassee, Florida, GVG Contemporary, and New Mexico and Williamsburg Art. Kuzana exhibited her work at the San Luis Obispo Museum of Art (SLOMA) in 2014 and the Bakersfield Museum of Art (BMOA) in 2015. In 2019 and 2020 she has had solo exhibitions at the K Contemporary gallery in Denver, Colorado.

== Film credits ==
2016 TV series Bloodline, produced by Netflix
