= Debbie Grossman =

American photographer

Debbie Grossman (born 1977) is an American photographer who lives and works in Brooklyn, New York.

== Early life and education ==
Debbie Grossman was born in 1977. She was originally from Rochester, New York. Grossman holds a BA in Women's Studies and Art History from Barnard College. She received an MFA in Photography, Video, and Related Media from the School of Visual Arts, where she won the Paula Rhodes Memorial Prize.

== Career ==
Grossman's work is included in the collections of the Metropolitan Museum of Art, the Museum of Fine Arts Houston, and the Jewish Museum. She was also a senior editor of the Popular Photography magazine.

=== My Pie Town ===
In her 2011 show, My Pie Town, Grossman created her best known body of work by manipulating photographs first created by Russell Lee of a small community of homesteaders in Pie Town, New Mexico.

My Pie Town first showed at Julie Saul Gallery from April 14 – May 21, 2011. In these images, Grossman reworks and re-imagines a body of images originally photographed by Russell Lee for the United States Farm Security Administration in 1940. Using Photoshop to modify Lee's pictures, Grossman created an imaginary, parallel world – a "Pie Town" populated and governed exclusively by women.

Grossman first saw the Lee's Pie Town pictures in the book Bound For Glory and obtained high resolution public domain versions of them on the Library of Congress website. Using sixteen of Lee's unpublished series on Pietown, a homesteaded community in New Mexico, Grossman took male bodies and rendered them to look like masculine women; in others, she shifted the body language of pairs of women, bringing them closer to create a sense of intimacy. Grossman says of the project "I’ve begun to think of Photoshop as my medium – I’m fascinated by the fact this it shares qualities with both photography and drawing…..I enjoy imagining My Pie Town working as its own kind of (lighthearted) propaganda". ..."[Lee's] pictures of the town are tinged with his mythologizing of a difficult way of life and the land-conquering kind of patriotism that’s a foundation of the American story. I share Lee’s nostalgia. Seventy years later, I am drawn to a similar utopian ideal. ... I’ve had a lifelong obsession with frontier life. I fantasize about locating myself within those pictures and that time. So in an attempt to make the history I wish was real, I have made over Pie Town to mirror my fantasy."

== Exhibitions ==
=== Solo exhibitions ===
- My Pie Town, Julie Saul Gallery (2011)

=== Group exhibitions ===
- Composed: Identity, Politics, Sex, The Jewish Museum, (2012)
- The Gender Show, Eastman Museum (2013)
- After Photoshop : Manipulated Photography in the Digital Age, The Metropolitan Museum 5th Ave (2013)
- FRAMING DESIRE: Photography and Video, The Modern Art Museum of Fort Worth (2015)
