= Alicia Eggert =

American interdisciplinary artist

- Born: 1981 (age 44–45); Camden, New Jersey, U.S.
- Known for: Interdisciplinary art
- Website: aliciaeggert.com

Alicia Eggert (born 1981) is an American artist known for her installations. Originally from Camden, New Jersey, she attended Drexel University and Alfred University. In 2018 she received the Hopper Prize. In 2019 she presented a TED Talk on her art. In 2021 she was commissioned by the Nasher Sculpture Center to create The Time for Becoming. It was installed in public space at 2000 Ross Avenue, Dallas, Texas.

Eggert collaborated with Planned Parenthood to create OURs, a pink neon sign installed in front of the Supreme Court of the United States on January 22, 2022, the anniversary of the Roe v. Wade ruling.

Her work, This Present Moment, was acquired by the Smithsonian American Art Museum as part of the Renwick Gallery's 50th Anniversary Campaign.
