= Alejandra González Soca =

Uruguayan artist, psychologist, and teacher (born 1973)

Alejandra González Soca (born 16 January 1973) is a Uruguayan visual artist, psychologist, and teacher.

== Biography ==
Alejandra González Soca lives in Montevideo. She graduated from the University of the Republic with a degree in Visual Arts, and holds a Psychology degree from the Catholic University of Uruguay. She attended the workshops of artists Anhelo Hernández and Carlos Capelán. She has participated in projects and individual and collective art exhibitions nationally and abroad.

Since 1999, she has held the Casa B studio workshop where she develops her artistic and teaching practice.

The work of Alejandra González Soca has been described as "the result of a tension between the unique and unrepeatable ephemeral gesture and the apparent dispersion of the multiplied object, materialized in a polyphonic integration of elements and registers." It is built from the confluence of the fragile and delicate with a certain dirty and germinal air probing a representation of an altered and intimate memory. It uses blurry images, overlapping layers and a formal sensuality where the viewer can have an immersive experience. This is a strategy to show cracks and breaks in the readings on topics such as violence, aggression, and frustration generated by the forms of agreed-upon silencing.

== Distinctions ==
- 2012, Selected for the 55th Wifredo Díaz Valdéz National Visual Arts Award
- 2014, Selected for the 56th José Gamarra National Visual Arts Award

== Residencies ==
- 2013, Artist invited to be part of the Trabajar Conversando project by artist Carlos Capelán, Union Foundation, Montevideo
- 2016, Artist in residence, Archaeology, Arts, and Sciences Heritage Studies Center, University of Coimbra, Portugal
- 2017, Curadora, Santa Fé, Argentina
