= Melinda Mollineaux =

Caribbean-Canadian visual artist (born 1964)

Melinda Molllineaux (1964–) is a Caribbean-Canadian visual artist based in Ottawa, Ontario. With interests in pinhole photography and ceramics, Mollineaux explores the concept of Black diaspora, looking specifically at Black histories in Canada. Her work has been exhibited in both solo and group exhibitions across Canada and has also been featured in numerous art publications.

== Early life and education ==
Mollineaux was born in London, England to Caribbean parents who moved immigrated from Trinidad to England in the 1950s. Before moving to Lethbridge, Alberta in 1981, Mollineaux spent time in Trinidad herself.

She received her B.A. at Simon Fraser University in Vancouver, British Columbia, then continued on to earn an MFA in photography at the University of Victoria on Vancouver Island. During her time in Vancouver in the 1990s, Mollineaux was the co-editor of Boo Magazine and played an active role in various artist-run centres including Artspeak Gallery and Or Gallery. Her artwork at the time centred on the historical presence of Black communities in the region.

== Canada Council ==
Beginning in 1999, Mollineaux worked as a program officer for the Canada Council's Visual Arts Section for six years. Serving as the acting equity coordinator in 2005, she was officially appointed the Coordinator of the Equity Office at the Canada Council for the Arts in 2006. In this role, the artist managed policies and initiatives related to cultural diversity with the goals of promoting equal access to Canada Council funding for minority artists and organizations.

Mollineaux now continues her work at the Canada Council for the Arts as a Policy and Planning Officer.

== Cadboro Bay: Index to an Incomplete History ==
Mollineaux's Cadboro Bay: Index to an Incomplete History (1998/2020) is a collection of images of pinhole exposures that documents the shore as a space of gathering for the Black community to gather to celebrate Emancipation Day in the late nineteenth and early twentieth centuries. Cadboro Bay was a home for enslaved Black people from San Francisco fleeing the enforced return to American plantations under the Fugitive Slave Act of 1850. Mollineaux's black and white photo essay evokes a sense of the invisibility of Blackness from the formation of Canadian identity by playing with concepts of absence and presence in space and time.

The medium enriches the potential of the work through the nature of pinhole photography requiring long exposures and an extended encounter between the photographer and subject, letting the artist linger within the space. Considering the extended history of the site, Cadboro Bay is also the ancestral land of the Lekwungen Checkonien people, further exposing the memory of those who inhabited the territory.

Cadboro Bay was featured at Thought, Outside, a 2020–2021 exhibition at Western Front curated by Amy Kazymerchyk. It was later exhibited at the Morris and Helen Belkin Art Gallery's Start Somewhere Else: Works from the Collection in 2022, which was curated by Melanie O'Brian and Krista Belle Stewart.
