= Jen Mann =

Canadian artist (born 1987)

- Born: 1987 (age 37–38); Toronto, Ontario
- Education: BFA from OCAD University
- Known for: Painter
- Notable work: Self Portrait as a Reflection
- Awards: Kingston Prize 2015
- Website: jenmann.com

Jen Mann (born 1987) is a Canadian artist known for large scale hyperrealistic portraiture. Mann graduated from OCAD University in 2009 with a BFA in printmaking and won the 2015 Kingston Prize for portraiture.

== Exhibitions ==
- Subconscious Vista at Gallery 1313, Toronto, ON (2011)
- Gathering of the Psyche at the Communication Gallery, Toronto, ON (2012)
- Daydream Believer at Neubacher Shor Contemporary Art Gallery, Toronto, ON (2012)
- Strange Beauties at Neubacher Shor Contemporary Art Gallery, Toronto, ON (2013)
- Q&A at the Neubacher Shor Contemporary Art Gallery, Toronto, ON (2014)
- Sweet Nothing at Cordesa Fine Art Gallery, Los Angeles, CA (2016)
- Notes On Love at Duran Mashaal Gallery, Montreal, QC (2018)
- Send Pix at Arsham/Fieg Gallery, New York, NY (2019)
- Metonymy at Gallery Jones, Vancouver, BC (2019)
