= Alessandra Torres =

Puerto Rican American visual artist

- Born: 1980 (age 45–46); Puerto Rico
- Education: Maryland Institute College of Art; Virginia Commonwealth University
- Known for: Sculpture, photography, performance
- Website: alessandratorres.com

Alessandra Torres (born 1980) is an American visual artist of Puerto Rican ancestry. Torres was raised in Puerto Rico, and now she resides in Baltimore, Maryland.

== Education ==
Torres studied and received a Bachelor of Fine Arts degree from the Maryland Institute College of Art (MICA) in 2002, and subsequently, in 2006, she earned a Master of Fine Arts in Sculpture at Virginia Commonwealth University.

== Art ==
Torres' artistic productions (performances, photography, and installations) have been staged and exhibited both in the United States and abroad, most notably at Art Basel Miami, Marianne Boesky Gallery in New York City, The Washington Project for the Arts' "Seven" exhibition and also its “Options” Biennial in Washington D.C., the Akademie Kunst en Industrie in Enschede, the Netherlands, and most recently at the BilbaoArte Fundación, in Spain, for her first major international solo exhibition. In 2014 her work was selected by American art collector Mera Rubell for a Rubell-curated show titled "Select 2014," an exhibit sponsored by the Washington Project for the Arts.

She notes about her work:

My body is the starting point for all of my work. Through Photography, Sculpture, and Interactive Sculptural Installations, I explore the body’s ability to function as a mark-making tool; its ability to communicate thoughts and emotions through gesture, movement, and body language; the body as form; as well as the malleable nature of physical identity. I allow myself to be directed by my physical impulses; I have an insatiable urge to fit into small spaces.

== Solo exhibitions ==
- 2002 Options: Biennial, Washington Project for the Arts/Corcoran Gallery of Art, Washington, D.C.
- 2002 Possess/Pose-us, Meyerhoff Gallery, MICA, Baltimore, Maryland
- 2002 Through My Mind's Eye, MICA Meyerhoff and Decker Gallery, Baltimore, Maryland
- 2004 Out of Body, Anderson Gallery, Richmond, Virginia
- 2005 Seven, Warehouse Galleries, Washington Project for the Arts/Corcoran Gallery of Art, Washington D.C.
- 2007 Figure Study, The Arlington Art Center, Arlington, Virginia
- 2015 Proprioception, funded by Fundación BBK, BilbaoArte Fundazioa, Bilbao, Spain
- 2019 Pulse Art Fair Miami Beach (Featured Artist), Miami Beach, FL
