= Romina Ressia =

Argentine contemporary artist

Romina R. Ressia
- Born: 11 March 1981 (age 45)
- Known for: Artist
- Website: www.rominaressiaph.com

Romina Ressia (born March 11, 1981, in Azul, Buenos Aires) is an Argentine photographer and artist. She is recognized for pioneering the use of anachronisms applied to images of strong Renaissance influence combined with contemporary objects. Which are incorporated into her scenes of complete classical aesthetics, generating a break with respect to the great masters’ paintings. Among her most iconic works are objects such as popcorn, chewing gum, hamburgers, sodas, a spaghetti, dental accessories, among others. Her works have been featured by The Huffington Post, Interview, Vanity Fair, Vogue Italia and The Wild Magazine, among others.

== Life and career ==
Ressia was born on March 11, 1981, in Azul, Buenos Aires, Argentina. At the age of 19 she moved to Capital Federal to study, where she graduated as an accountant with a Bachelor of Business Administration at the University of Buenos Aires. She later quit accounting to devote herself to photography, which she studied along with art direction and scenery at the Teatro Colon.

She started in fashion photography but transitioned to fine arts, venturing beyond photography into mixed media.

It was fast that the artist gained popularity in the Art world. In 2017, The Women’s Forum for the Economy and Society selected her as one of the seventeen young women who are in their way to become the most influential figures of the world. Her works have been largely exhibited in London, Edinburgh, Buenos Aires, Cordoba, Barcelona, Norway, Paris, Zurich, Milan, New York, Los Angeles, Brussels, among other cities.

== Selected works ==
- Pop-Corn and Double Bubblegum, from the series How Would Have Been, Argentina, 2013). This piece is part of the permanent collection of Columbus Museum of Art.
- Venus series
- 18th Century series
- Ladies series
- Not about death series
- What Do You Hide series
- Renaissance Cubism series
- Not About Death series
- The modern world through classic eyes Paris, 2014. Publisher: Yellow Korner. First Edition of 1,000 copies. ISBN 9782919469840

== Production of the artist ==
The artist is characterized by the use of anachronisms and juxtapositions that allow to draw a timeline from which to explore human evolution and their behavior as individuals and as a collective. Ressia, along with other artists such as Hendrik Kerstens, despite the differences in their approach, have paved the way for many other image’s creators who choose to bring the past into the present by incorporating current objects into scenes from past centuries.

== Gallery representation ==
- HOFA Gallery - London and Mykonos
- Arusha Gallery - UK
- Samuel Marthaler Gallery - Belgium
- Laurent Marthaler Contemporary - Switzerland
- Leica Gallery - Brazil
