= Carey Maxon =

American artist, born 1978

Carey Maxon (born 1978) is an American artist. Her work is included in the collections of the Whitney Museum of American Art and the Museum of Modern Art, New York.
