= Pinar Yolaçan =

Turkish artist

Pinar Yolaçan (born 1981) is a contemporary Turkish artist based in New York City. One of her most well-known series, Perishables, depicts portraits of elderly women in garments created by Yolaçan from raw meat and animal parts.

Yolaçan studied fashion design at Central Saint Martins College of Art and Design and Media Art in Chelsea School of Art before graduating from the Cooper Union with a BFA in 2004. While at Cooper Union, Yolaçan was runner-up in the New York Times Magazine "Capture The Times", photography contest for college students.

Yolaçan describes her underlying theme in her work as her "interest in the female body". She has cited inspiration in forms of the Queen of England-type imperial icon and the Victorian body, to the Christian religious icons of Maria and the colonial baroque period, to deity figures from pre-neolithic period which was the archetype of beauty surrounding Turkey thousands of years ago.
