= Myriam Yates =

Canadian artist

- Born: Myriam Yates ca. 1971; Montreal, Quebec, Canada

Myriam Yates (born 1971 in Montreal, Quebec) is a Canadian artist. Yates is known for her photography and her video art installation works. Her work is included in the collections of the Musée d'art contemporain de Montréal and the Musée national des beaux-arts du Québec.
