= Laurence Vallières =

Canadian artist

Laurence Vallières (born 1986) is a Canadian sculptor and artist. Vallières is best known for her sculptures made from upcycled materials. In 2016 she was commissioned by the Burning Man Festival to create two large cardboard ape sculptures, titled Seeing humanity for what it really is. Her work is included in the Coleccion Solo in Madrid, Spain.

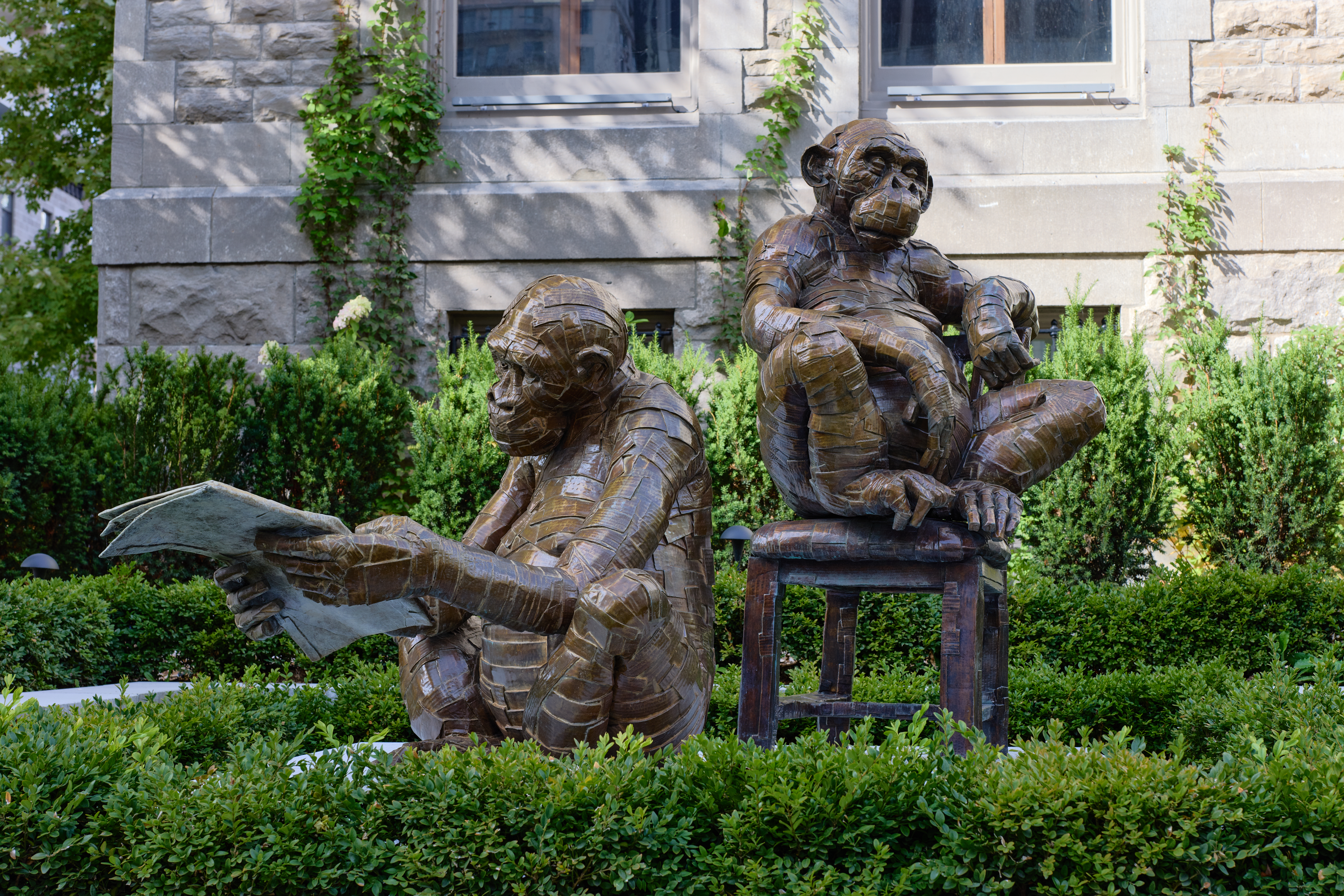
La réflexion du chimpanzé (2021)
