= Dominique Rey (artist) =

Canadian multidisciplinary artist

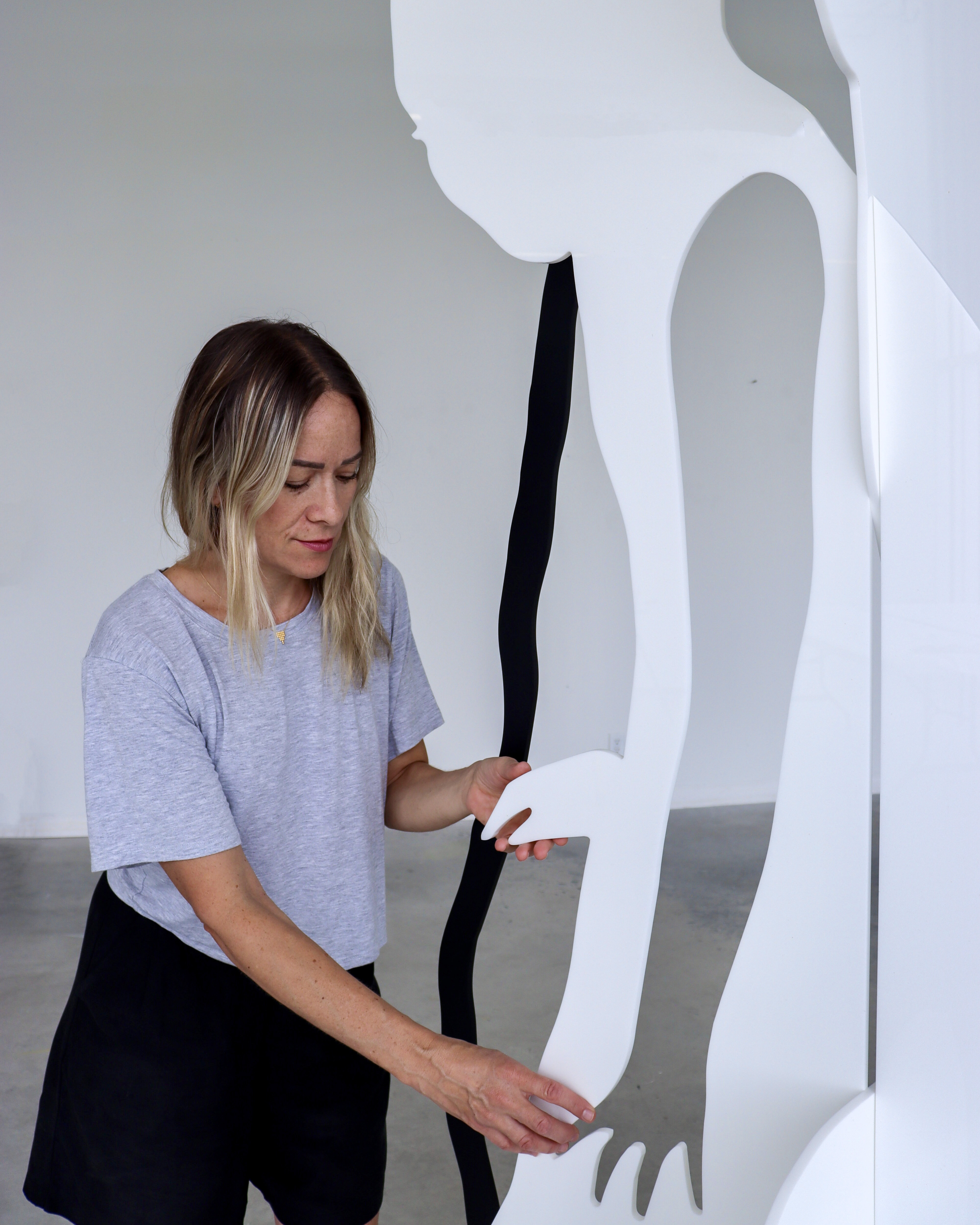
Dominique Rey, 2024

Dominique Rey (born 1976) is a Canadian multidisciplinary artist based in Winnipeg, Manitoba. Her work spans photography, installation, video, and performance, and has been exhibited across Canada, the United States, and Europe.

Her work has been discussed in publications including the Winnipeg Free Press, Galleries West, and Border Crossings.

== Practice and reception ==
Rey’s practice investigates questions of identity, subjectivity, and the body through photography, installation, and performance, often employing fragmentation and performative strategies to explore embodied and relational experience.

Her exhibition MOTHERGROUND (2024), presented at the Winnipeg Art Gallery and later at Museum London, examines motherhood as a form of creative and material labour, incorporating collaborative and process-based approaches.

Critical responses to the exhibition have emphasized its experimental structure and thematic focus. Writing in Galleries West, Alison Gillmor described the work as “ambitious” and “experimental,” noting its engagement with the complexities of maternal experience.

In the Winnipeg Free Press, Jen Zoratti highlighted Rey’s use of play, unpredictability, and material experimentation in her exploration of identity and relational experience.

== Education ==
Rey received a Bachelor of Fine Arts from the University of Manitoba and completed graduate studies in photography at Bard College and in new media at the Transart Institute.

== Exhibitions ==
Rey has presented solo and group exhibitions at institutions and artist-run centres in Canada and internationally.

=== Selected solo exhibitions ===
- MOTHERGROUND (2024), Winnipeg Art Gallery; Museum London
- Le vide entre nos corps (2023), VU, Quebec City
- Pieces of Me Pieces of You (2017), Richard Rhodes Dupont Projects, Toronto
- Under the Rose Arch (2015), MacLaren Art Centre, Barrie

=== Selected group exhibitions ===
- Picasso: Becoming the Faun (2023), Remai Modern, Saskatoon
- Le septième pétale d’une tulipe-monstre (2023), Galerie de l’UQAM, Montreal

== Collections ==
Her work is held in public and private collections, including Canadian institutional collections.
