= Kerry McAleer-Keeler =

American book artist

Kerry McAleer-Keeler (b. 1971) is an American book artist, printmaker, and educator.

== Early life and education ==
McAleer-Keeler attended Mount Holyoke College and George Washington University.

== Career ==
McAleer-Keeler's 2007 artist book, Gifts from Our Elders, is in the Smithsonian Libraries and Archives. She provided illustrations for the collaborative book Uncovering white privilege : a primer which is housed in the collection of the University of Puget Sound Artists' Books Collection. Her 2011 book [For the birds] is held in the National Museum of Women in the Arts.

Her work was included in the 2020 exhibition Sea Change at the Washington Printmakers Gallery. Her work was in the exhibition Paper Boats 2021 at the Los Angeles Printmaking Society. She teaches at the Corcoran School of the Arts and Design.
