= Han Yajuan =

Chinese painter

Han Yajuan (born 1980), also spelled Han Ya Juan (Chinese: 韩娅娟) is a Chinese contemporary artist (中国当代艺术, Zhongguo Dangdai Yishu). She currently lives and works in Beijing. Han Yajuan ranks seventh on the all-time list of artists who have grossed the most money at auction before their 30th birthday.

== Early life and education ==
She was born in Qingdao, China, and studied art at the China Academy of Art. After the graduation, in 2004, she worked in College of Visual Art. In 2008 Yajuan obtained a master's degree at the Oil Painting Department of the China Central Academy of Fine Arts, Beijing. Han Yajuan ranks seventh on the all-time list of artists who have grossed the most money at auction before their 30th birthday.

== Career ==
She had her first solo exhibition at China Academy of Art in Hangzhou, China, in 1999. After that she took part in a number of exhibitions in China and abroad.

== Artwork ==
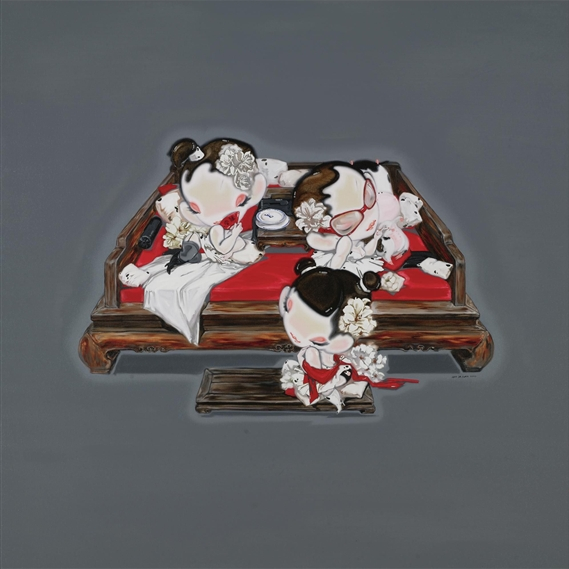
A Faint Fragrance, oil on canvas, which was auctioned for $73,000 at Sotheby's in 2007.

Yajuan belongs to the new Chinese painting movement. Her works have clear and occasionally ironic references to pop and ultra-contemporary culture. Han Yajuan is said to distance herself to some extent from the earlier social responsibility faced by traditional art, preferring a simple and direct style that portrays the light-hearted themes of young people's collective imagination, with a nod to the cartoons and cinema of the Cartoon Generation. The mainly female subjects whirl and dance, flying through the air in strong, contrasting colours; indifferent and ironical figures in a carefree world. As described by Blouin Artinfo, "Fascinated by fashion and celebrity culture, Han Ya Juan's paintings are characterized by pixie girls who dance, fly, and dream as they clutch their Dior Handbags and flaunt their Fendi bracelets. While many Chinese artists would use these emblems as a means of criticizing Western influence on traditional China, Han Ya Juan celebrates the exuberance and fun they bring to a young and hopeful Chinese generation." According to Newsweek, Han Yajuan's figures, who have all the trappings of contemporary city girls: flashy cars, designer sunglasses and bulging shopping bags, "appear to live guilt-free lives of consumption, which the artist says embodies the dreams and aspirations of her generation." "Han clearly shows empowered females that are benefiting from the economic boom," says, in Newsweek, Mila Bollansee, a curator based in Beijing. "Yet if her theme is that of a strong, independent woman, she's also fully aware that women in China are not on an equal footing with men. Her message is for each individual to take responsibility for him or herself in this new society." Some other observers note that for all their cuteness and flippant humor, these cartoonlike characters evoke a sense of loneliness, anxiety and spiritual emptiness. Karen Smith, a well-known Beijing art critic, believes the "me" generation is struggling with being single children who marry single children, overindulged by parents and in-laws but expected to one day support them.

Her work is regularly sold by leading international auction houses such as Christie's or Sotheby's.

== Exhibition History ==
Solo Exhibitions
2016 "superlative," Longmen Arts Project, Shanghai, China
2011 "Indulgence and Transcendence," Klein Sun Gallery, New York, NY
2009 "Bling Bling," Chinese Contemporary, New York, NY
2008 "Herstory," Marella Gallery, Beijing, China
2008 "Angels from Hell," Olyvia Oriental, London, UK
2007 "Travel Alone," Tokyo Gallery, Tokyo, Japan
2007 "Selection of Dreams," Willem Kerseboom Gallery, Amsterdam, Holland
2007 "Delightful Escape," Project B Contemporary Art, Milan, Italy
2007 "Beautiful Plan," TaiKang Top Space, Beijing, China
2006 "Milkshakes," Art Beatus, Hong Kong
