= Priya Kambli =

Indian photographer

Priya Kambli (born 1975) is an Indian photographer.

== Early life and education ==
Kambli was born in India. She received a BFA degree from the University of Louisiana at Lafayette and an MFA degree from the University of Houston.

== Career ==
Kambli was an Artist-in-Residence in 2009 at Light Work. Her work is included in the collection of the Museum of Fine Arts, Houston, Light Work, and the Museum of Contemporary Photography.

Kambli is a professor of art at Truman State University, Missouri.
