= Christy Oates =

American woodworker

- Born: Bloomington, Wisconsin
- Education: Minneapolis College of Art and Design, BFA; San Diego State University, MFA
- Website: Official Website

Christy Oates (born 1980) is an American woodworker and furniture designer based in Fennimore, Wisconsin.

== Early life and education ==
Oates was born in Bloomington, Wisconsin, and later lived in La Crosse. She received her BFA in furniture design at the Minneapolis College of Art and Design, and completed her MFA, also in furniture design, at San Diego State University; her thesis exhibition was the subject of a piece in American Woodworker magazine.

== Artwork ==
Oates utilizes digital technologies such as computer-aided drafting (CAD) programs and computer numerical control (CNC) routers and laser cutters in her work. Oates says she is interested in the intersection of art and manufacturing.

== Exhibitions ==
Oates was among the artists featured in the exhibit "40 Under 40: Craft Futures" at the Renwick Gallery of the Smithsonian Museum of American Art, and two of her pieces were subsequently accessioned by the museum. Oates's work was included in the 2017 exhibition "Contemporary Wood Lighting" at the Messler Gallery of the Center for Furniture Craftsmanship. Her work was included in the exhibition "Making a Seat at the Table: Women Transform Woodworking" shown at the Center for Art in Wood in 2019–2020.
