= Christy Matson =

American textile artist (born 1979)

Christy Matson (born 1979) is an American textile artist.

A native of Seattle, Matson studied at the University of Washington and at the California College of the Arts. She has taught at the School of the Art Institute of Chicago; currently she lives and works in Los Angeles. Her pieces begin as drawings and watercolors, which are then transformed into woven works using a Jacquard loom. Matson was among the artists featured in the exhibit "40 Under 40: Craft Futures" at the Renwick Gallery of the Smithsonian Museum of American Art, and one of her pieces was subsequently accessioned by the museum.
