= Swarna Chitrakar =

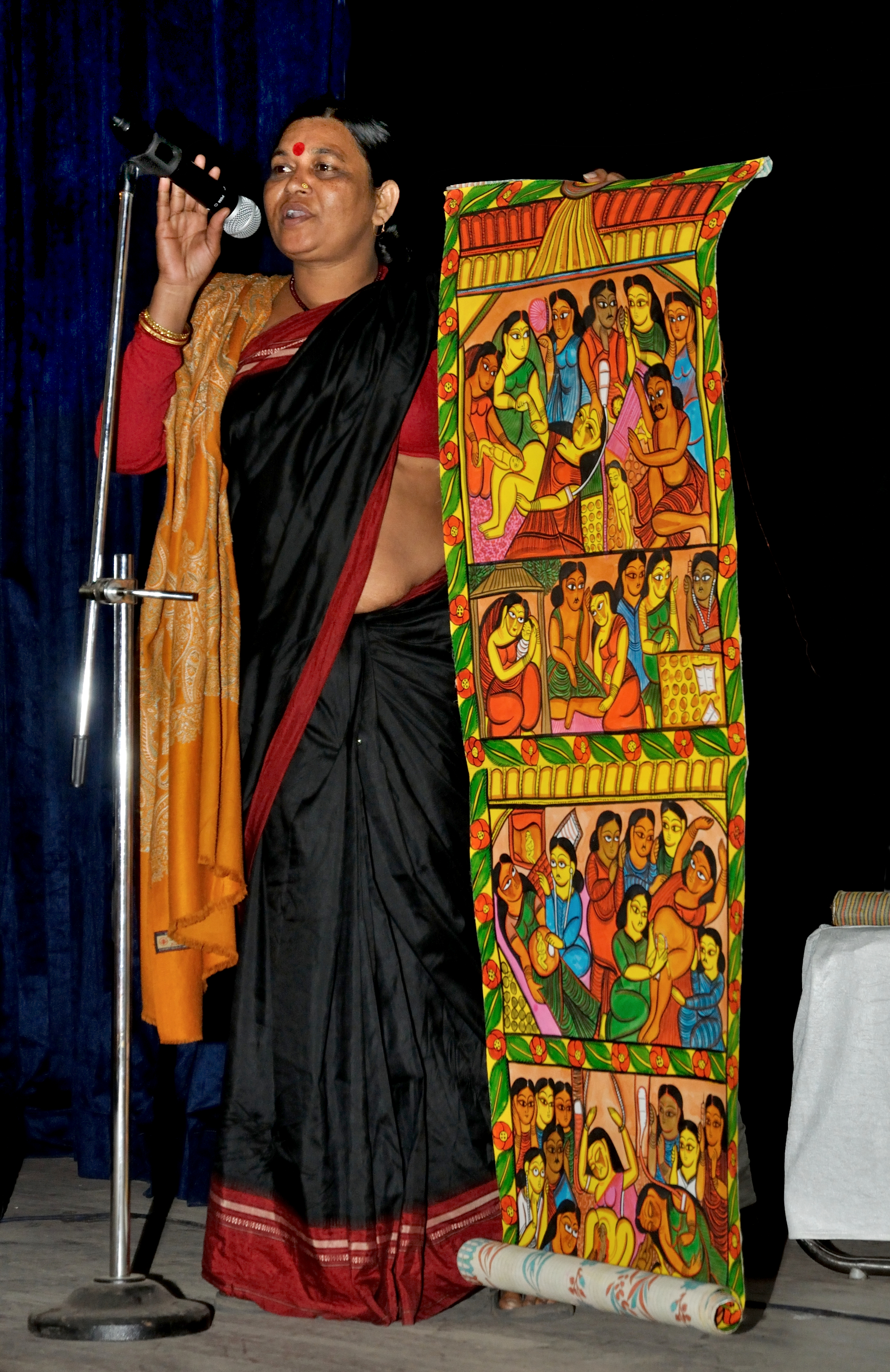
- Swarna Chitrakar during an international conference and intensive seminar on 'Strategic Transformations: Museums in 21st Century' at Ashutosh Birth Centenary Hall, Indian Museum, Kolkata
- Born: 1974 (age 51–52); Naya village Pingla, West Bengal, India
- Spouse: Sambhu Chitrakar
- Children: Mamoni Chitrakar, Sonali Chitrakar, Runa Chitrakar, Jhunur Chitrakar & Nupur Chitrakar (daughters)
- Awards: 1994 State level Award – visual artist

Swarna Chitrakar (born 1974) is a Patachitra artist from Pingla, a changemaker and a community leader.

== Early life ==
Chitrakar was born in 1974 in Naya village of West Midnapur of West Bengal. She learnt painting from her father but her parents married her off at her early age due to poverty. After marriage she took up paint and brush mainly to support her family. She stayed with her husband and 5 daughters. All of them are Patua.

== Career ==
Chitrakar returned to her home, there she started Patachitra painting and started her journey as Patua. She learnt scroll painting and Patua music from her father in his childhood. She had showcased her art in the countries Australia, China, England, France, Germany, Sweden, and the United States. Swarna Chitrakar used her expertise pat painting with a melodic song for social cause like awareness about COVID-19. She used 7 scrolls to depict the current situation as well as COVID-forntline healthcare workers and awareness message like staying indoor and use of mask and washing hand when necessary. A video where she is singing and showing those Patachitra has been viewed more than 99,000 times on Facebook.

== Social issue through Patachitra and Patua music ==
Chitrakar covers major incidents like Tsunami, September 11 attacks and social issues like Tuberculosis, HIV/AIDS, child marriage, trafficking of children and COVID-19 etc. through her Patachitra and her self composed Patua Sangeet.

== Awards ==
- State level award in 1994

== Books ==
Collodi, Carlo. The Patua Pinocchio. Illustrated by Swarna Chitrakar and translated by Carol Della Chiesa. publisher Tara Books; Illustrated edition, May 12, 2015
