= Kit Paulson =

American artist

- Born: 1981; Hinsdale, Illinois
- Known for: glass artist
- Website: kitpaulsonglass.com

Kit Paulson (born 1981, in Hinsdale, Illinois) is an American artist known for glass flamework. She attended Alfred University and Southern Illinois University Carbondale. Paulson completed residencies at Salem State University in Salem, Massachusetts, the Museum of Glass in Tacoma, Washington, and the Penland School of Craft. She has taught at Penland as well as Bild-Werk Frauenau in Bavaria, Germany. Her work, Lungs, was acquired by the Smithsonian American Art Museum as part of the Renwick Gallery's 50th Anniversary Campaign.
