= Caroline Mesquita =

French sculptor

Caroline Mesquita (born 1989) is a French sculptor. Mesquita was born in Brest, in Finistère, France. She has used film, and particularly stop motion animation, as a component of her work. Her work is included in the collections of the Musée National d'Art Moderne, Paris and the Fonds régional d'art contemporain.
