= Manon De Pauw =

Canadian artist

Manon De Pauw (born 1971) is a Canadian artist known for her work in installation art, performance, video art and photography. De Pauw was born in Vancouver, British Columbia. She was a shortlist nominee for the 2011 Sobey Art Award. Her work is included in the collections of the Musée d'art contemporain de Montréal and the Musée national des beaux-arts du Québec.
