= Clare Grill =

American painter (born 1979)

Clare Grill (born 1979) is an American artist from Western Springs, Illinois. Grill currently lives and works in Queens, New York.

For her undergraduate degree, Grill attended the University of St. Thomas in St. Paul, Minnesota. She received instruction in painting at the nearby St. Catherine University because her university did not have an art department. After college, she moved to New York City to pursue her MFA at Pratt Institute.

Grill began her career in New York as a figurative painter. In 2008, the New York Times described Grill as a landscape and figurative painter in a profile of her and other artists' work in a group show at Aljira, a Center for Contemporary Art in Newark.

In her artist statement for her 2010 show, "What You're Told," at the Jen Bekman Gallery, Grill elaborated on her inspiration, source material and process:

"I think about the beliefs and stories that were handed down to me and I reinterpret them in my paintings. Family folklore, backyard rituals, religious sacraments, ghost stories, church, school, obedience and trust in what you're told are among my subjects. The things we're taught can be learned a thousand different ways. I like for the familiar to seem a little unfamiliar and complicated, because it is.

I look at images from the past as I work because they're heartbreaking and so haunting – what was never can be again. I mess with my imagery, layering and wearing it away until I've made a painting that makes you notice the paint as much as the pictures."

Grill's recent works are abstract, drawing inspiration from early American sampler embroidery. After studying artists Peter Doig and Mamma Andersson, Grill began to rely her source material for a mood, rather than a literal imagery or narrative.

Grill's 2015 Touch’d Lustre was her fifth solo show in New York, and her first show at the gallery Zieher Smith & Horton. The show included eight large, abstract, oil-on-linen paintings. Further departing from her figurative beginnings, the paintings' imagery referred to modernist abstraction. The show attracted critical attention from publications including The New York Times, The Brooklyn Rail, and Hyperallergic. She is represented by Derek Eller Gallery in New York City. In 2021, Derek Eller Gallery held a solo exhibit of Grill's work, There's the Air.
