= Julia Rommel =

American painter

- Born: 1980 (age 45–46); Salisbury, Maryland, U.S.
- Known for: Painting

Julia Rommel is an American painter. Her work is in the collections of the Museum of Modern Art and the Whitney Museum.

== Exhibitions ==
- Long Leash, Overduin & Co., Los Angeles, CA, 2020
- Fall Guy, Standard (Oslo), Oslo, Norway, 2019
- Candy Jail, Bureau, New York, 2019
- Twin Bed, Bureau at Tanya Leighton, 2018
- A Cheesecake with Your Name on It, Overduin & Co., Los Angeles, CA, 2016
- Two Italians, Six Lifeguards, The Aldrich Contemporary Art Museum, Ridgefield, Connecticut, November 2015 – April 2016 (curated by Amy Smith-Stewart)

== Work ==
Julia Rommel is an American abstract painter. Her early paintings were typically monochromes of blacks and muted colors. Rommel make paintings of various sizes with cool to warm color palettes of blues, greys, reds and bright citrus hues. She makes her paintings using a construction and deconstruction process. Rommel’s laborious process of painting includes cutting and sanding the canvas, and wiping away and adding layers of paint. Her working method stresses the canvas surfaces with physical manipulation, and admits frayed edges and staple holes. Rommel allows imperfection in her painting which gives her work a handmade aesthetic. “Whenever I approach what looks like an existing modernist painting, I know I have to change something,” says Rommel in an interview with Art in America, “I try to mess up the painting to prevent a fixed reading that reflects an established tradition.”

== Collections ==
Among the museums holding her work are: the Albright-Knox Art Gallery in Buffalo; the Hammer Museum in Los Angeles; the Museum of Modern Art in New York City; the San Francisco Museum of Modern Art; the Whitney Museum of American Art in New York City; and the Walker Art Center in Minneapolis.

== Publications ==
- Julia Rommel, texts by Rebecca Bengal and Julia Rommel, edited by Arno Baudin and Julia Rommel, Zolo Press, 2021, 288 pages, 235 × 305 mm, 800 copies, printed in Belgium.
