= Jeannine Marchand =

American artist

- Born: 1976; San Juan, Puerto Rico
- Known for: ceramist
- Website: jeanninemarchand.com

Jeannine Marchand (b. 1976, San Juan, Puerto Rico) is an American artist known for folded clay pieces. She attended Saint Joseph's University and the Cranbrook Academy of Art. She is located in Spruce Pine, North Carolina. In 2014 she created the installation Jeannine Marchand: Con Relación al Espacio for the Latin American Contemporary Art (LaCa) Projects. Her work is in the collection of the Museo de Arte Contemporáneo de Puerto Rico and the Keramiekcentrum Tiendschuur. Her work, FOLDS CLXVIII, was acquired by the Smithsonian American Art Museum as part of the Renwick Gallery's 50th Anniversary Campaign.
