= Stephanie Liner =

American sculptor (born 1978)

Stephanie Liner (born 1978) is an American sculptor.

A native of Charlotte, North Carolina, Liner was born into a family with connections to the fabric and furniture industries, which led to her fascination with both fields. She studied at the College of Design at North Carolina State University, doing her graduate work at the University of Wisconsin–Madison; during a break from the latter she worked for an upholsterers'. Her sculptures, which she dubs "orbs", are formed around a plywood skeleton which is then stuffed and upholstered. Some contain space for a person inside. Liner was among the artists featured in the exhibit "40 Under 40: Craft Futures" at the Renwick Gallery of the Smithsonian Museum of American Art, and one of her pieces was subsequently accessioned by the museum.
