= Sabrina Gschwandtner =

American artist (born 1977)

- Born: 1977; Washington, D.C.
- Known for: Textiles, film
- Website: sabrinag.com

Sabrina Gschwandtner (born 1977) is an American artist currently living in Los Angeles, California. She has held numerous showings of her work throughout the country and several pieces have been acquired by museums, including LACMA, the Walker Art Center, the Smithsonian American Art Museum, the Museum of Fine Arts, Boston, and the RISD Museum, among others.

== Biography ==
Sabrina Gschwandtner was born in 1977 in Washington, DC. She studied at the Sommerakademie für Bildende Kunst in Salzburg, Austria under the direction of Valie Export and also with Vlada Petric, founder of the Harvard Film Archive. She earned a Bachelor of Arts with honors in art/semiotics from Brown University in 2000 and in 2008 she received her Master of Fine Arts from Bard College. She is the author of the book Knitknit : Profiles + Projects from Knitting's New Wave.

== Artworks and techniques ==
Gschwandtner uses film, video, photography, and textiles as her mediums. She sews together filmstrips to create a quilt-like textile. She often installs her work in front of LED lights. This allows viewers to see through the filmstrips when the work is examined closely. She began sewing filmstrips together in 2009 when a friend supplied her with 16 mm films from the Anthology Film Archives that were no longer is use at the Fashion Institute of Technology. The film used by Gschwandtner varies largely in its subject matter. The documentaries range from art centered subjects to those of feminism, and even scientific references. However, most film strips are from the 1950s to the 1980s. Many of the short documentary films recognized and admired women's role in craft making, such as knitting, crocheting, and fabric dyeing. After she watches the films, she cuts and sews them together in patterns that resemble popular American quilt motifs. She has made several works in a "crazy quilt" pattern. Leah Ollman of the LA Times wrote in a 2017 review: "Gschwandtner unites the strips in traditional quilt patterns — interlocking triangles and diamonds set within squares, energetic designs that play surface against depth, control against abandon. She makes astute use of color, mixing vivid stretches of jade, yellow and cerulean with the faded hues of old footage, all accented with black countdown leader and lengths of toned emptiness." Gschwandtner uses quilts because their significance is quite expansive. These works address the nature of what many label as women's work (craft) to be undervalued and overlooked. Film Archivist Andrew Lampert reflects upon the ways Gschwandtner's work has a clear effect of expanding the general understanding of film editing. By combining two often separate mediums, Gschwandtner has redefined the way narrative exists and the nature of using images in works.

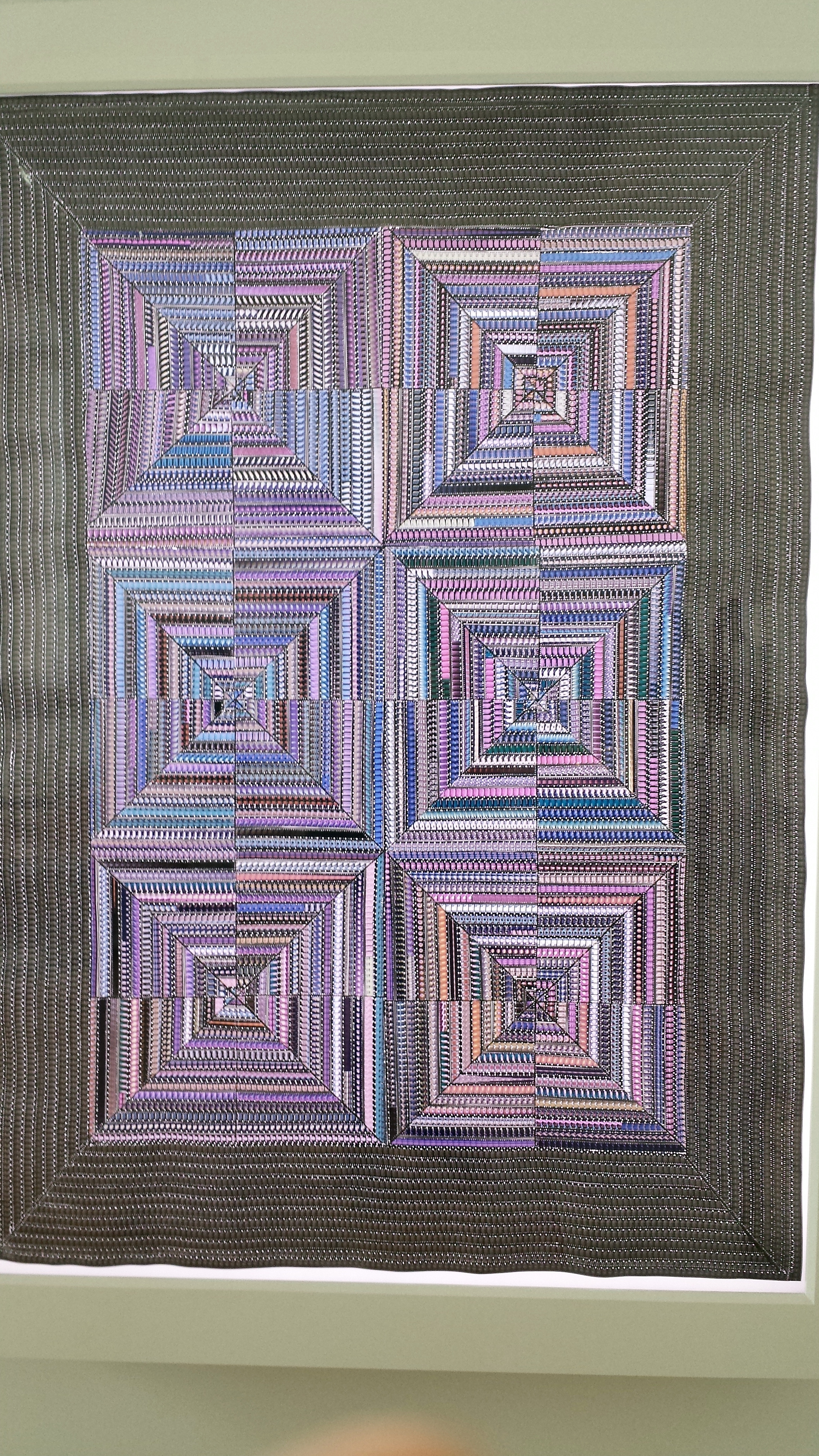
Sabrina Gschwandtner, Fibers and Civilization, 2009, 16 mm film and polyamide thread

Other works include films and installations for specific sites. For example, Gschwandtner created "Crochet Film" (2004) specifically for a show "Group Loop," put together by Christoph Cox about repetition and cycles. Her piece featured two loops, one, a film of the artist crocheting and the other a crocheted piece representing a film loop. Another series of work on the same theme is "The History of String." In this series Gschwandtner draws many comparisons between the work of more modern sewing machines and older film projectors. By utilizing newer techniques and older technology, she creates a more expansive understanding of the art forms of both textile and film. Her work addresses many topics and uniquely works to combine two differing forms of artistic expression. Her work often combines these multiple mediums to form a message, often of female empowerment in craft. Gschwandtner redefines craft in textiles and the art of filmmaking by bringing these elements together into a professional art scene.

== Collections and exhibitions ==
Gschwandtner's work has been exhibited worldwide at institutions, such as the Renwick Gallery of the Smithsonian American Art Museum (Washington D.C.), the Museum of Arts and Design (New York), Crystal Bridges Museum of American Art (Arkansas), and the Victoria and Albert Museum (London). Her work is in the permanent collections of the Smithsonian American Art Museum, Museum of Fine Arts, Boston, the RISD Museum, LACMA, Walker Art Center, and the Carl & Marilynn Thoma Art Foundation.
