= Vivian Keulards =

Dutch photographer

Vivian Keulards, born in 1970, is a Dutch photographer. She attended the Fotoacademie in Amsterdam. In 2019, her book To Hans was published by Schilt Publishing.

Her work is included in the collections of the Museum of Fine Arts Houston and the Colorado Photographic Arts Center.
