= Barbara Rapp =

Austrian multimedia artist (born 1972)

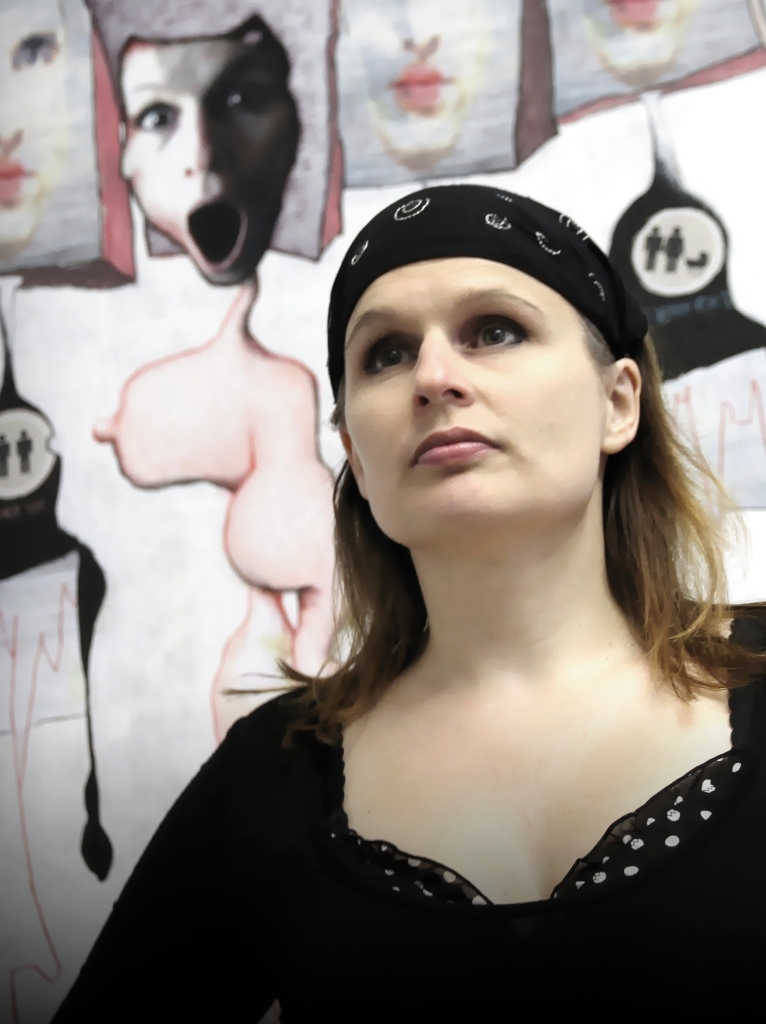
- Rapp in 2012
- Born: 1972 (age 53–54); Klagenfurt, Austria
- Website: barbara-rapp.com

Barbara Rapp (also known as Barbara Ambrusch-Rapp) (born 1972) is an Austrian multimedia artist. She makes paintings, collages, and sculptures that examine women's sexuality, queerness, gender and heteronormativity, often using humor. As a crossover artist, she generally focuses on socio-political issues, human rights, discrimination, etc. and has also been dealing with the post-Anthropocene since the end of the 2010s.

In 2014, Rapp was selected by the curatorium of the Fashion Art Institute Barcelona (Designer Manuel Fernandez) to represent Austria for "Fashion Art EU" at the European Parliament Brussels 2015 and European Museum of Modern Art MEAM Barcelona 2016. For Barbara Rapp fashion does not only bear a social responsibility but also reflects the current socio-cultural developments. After receiving the white dress in folkloristic "dirndl-style" from the fashion art institute it was immediately clear for her that she has to withdraw its automated categorization. Her general artistic focus is on the critical questioning of gender role models. Accordingly, she tried to create the artistic design of her dress called "Trapp 3.0" not only by contemporary re-engineering the traditional mapping of folklore but also to encourage new perspectives on female and male forms of appearance.

In 2024, the public broadcaster ORF visualised the interdisciplinary work of Barbara Ambrusch-Rapp in a tv-portrait in which the artist's focus on human rights is mentioned.

In 2025, Barbara Ambrusch-Rapp was elected to the artistic advisory board of the Carinthian Art Association (Kunstverein Kärnten).
