= Samera Paz =

Samera Paz is an artist and organizer from Washington, D.C., born on May 19, 1994, and current student at the University of the Arts in Philadelphia. She is known for leading Girl Power Meetups in D.C. Paz mostly uses photography but has also done some performance art and works with themes such as gender, race, and mental health.

== Work ==
Paz started using menstrual blood to make her art when she was 16 and creates pieces that are mostly abstract, based in line, shapes, and patterns. Paz finds her blood and her art "natural and beautiful," and believes she's relieving the stigma around periods, but she received a lot of backlash after posting her work on social media.

She has been featured in several group exhibitions in galleries like Transformer in D.C. and aspires to be a war photographer.

== Social movements and organizations ==
While in D.C. in 2015, Paz founded a movement called Girl Power Meetups based in D.C., "run by women of color that aims to bring young women together to support, educate, connect and collaborate creatively." She started it because she wanted celebrations of women artists to cater more to young people and happen more often. "The events range from pure fun, like clothing swaps and yoga classes, to career development—and even a visit to the White House to meet with women working in prominent positions."

Paz faced public backlash in 2016 for hosting a “Boy Power Meetup.” Critics pointed out the performative nature of the gesture and an attempt to grant men unnecessary societal power, given that men already hold a disproportionate social, political, and economic influence.

Along with Girl Power Meetups, Paz also runs Locals Only DC, which is a Tumblr page devoted to highlighting local talent with interviews and features with D.C. artists that goes unrecognized in the mainstream art scene.

Paz also founded Chocolate MLK, "a movement to celebrate and educate people on black history" which an emphasis on D.C. history and gentrification.
