= Harriet Riddell =

British textile artist

- Born: 1990 (age 35–36)
- Education: University of Hertfordshire
- Known for: textile art
- Website: institchyou.com

Harriet Riddell (born 1990) is a performance textile artist and educator from Oxfordshire who uses freeform embroidery to create stitched portraits and live scenarios. Often stitching in challenging locations such as public markets, slums and fields, she has used solar energy, bicycle-powered batteries, and foot pedals to power her sewing machine. Riddell has exhibited her work around the world including in London, Delhi, Nairobi and Toronto.

Riddell initially learned to use a sewing machine as a young child from her mother. Riddell's grandmother, a Canadian textile artist, taught her freeform embroidery when Riddell was ten years old.
