= Polly Nor =

English artist (born 1989)

- Born: 2 June 1989 (age 37); London, England
- Education: Loughborough University
- Website: www.pollynor.com

Polly Nor (born 2 June 1989 in London, England) is a London based multidisciplinary and contemporary freelance surrealist artist who draws "women and their demons". Her art mainly focuses on the themes of female identity, self-esteem in the 21st century and the portrayal of women in their bedrooms. Nor states that she is inspired by her own experiences as a woman; her struggles with depression, technology, and the societal pressures to meet the expectations of the average, modern-day woman. She works in a multitude of mediums, including print and sculpture, to create her unconventional style. She grew up drawing and received a degree in illustration from Loughborough University.

== Career ==
According to Niloufar Haidari, Nor's satirical and humorous look into female sexuality and its demons led to her rise in popularity. Her art has become famous on social media and she has worked with Gucci, Andy Baker and Chelou for the music video "Halfway to Nowhere", Dazed, Dr Martens, and Complex magazine. She was also a guest speaker for The Apple Store hosted by Dazed in 2016. In 2017, Nor was working on illustrating a book for Bloomsbury Publishing and had an exhibition through Red Bull Studios London.

== Works ==
Nor initially became popular online, and her work has been shown in multiple art galleries. As a part of the Association of Illustrators, she has produced various shows including "Sorry Grandma: An Exhibition of Obscene Illustrations" at 71a Gallery in 2015 and "It's Called Art Mum, Look it Up" and "Airing My Dirty Laundry In Public" at Protein Studios in 2017 and 2018, respectively. While most of her shows take place in London, she has shown her work at the "NSFW: The Female Gaze" exhibit at the Museum of Sex in New York City. Her artwork often references pop culture and per Haidari, is considered a modern-day take of the Lowbrow art movement.

Nor says her work, especially her common theme "women in devil suits", is "about growing up: feeling the pressure to look a certain way, or to put this face on for the rest of the world, but lots of people read into it in different ways".
