= Olia Mishchenko =

Canadian artist

Olia Mishchenko (born 1980) is a Canadian artist. Mischenko is known for her drawings representing imaginary public spaces and architecture. Mischenko was born in Kiev. In 1997 she and emigrated to Canada. In 2015 her work was included in the exhibit "The Ukrainian Diaspora: Women Artists 1908–2015" at the Ukrainian Museum in New York.

Her work is included in the collections of the National Gallery of Canada and the Agnes Etherington Art Centre.
