= Saba Masoumian =

Iranian artist (born 1982)

Saba Masoumian (born 1982) is an Iranian artist who lives and works in Italy.

Masoumian was born in Tehran and received a BA in graphic design from Azad University. Masoumian went on to study painting at the Accademia di Belle Arti di Bologna.

She has had solo shows in Tehran and Dubai and her work was included in several group exhibitions in Bologna. Masoumian also participated in the Biennale Giovani in Monza, the Dimension of Civilization conference at the Yinchuan Museum of Contemporary Art and the show "1001 colors: Contemporary Art from Iran" in New York City.

Masoumian received the Premio Ora awarded in Verona in 2015 and the Golden Pen Award at the Belgrade Biennial of Illustrations in 2007.
