= Mia Florentine Weiss =

German conceptual and performance artist

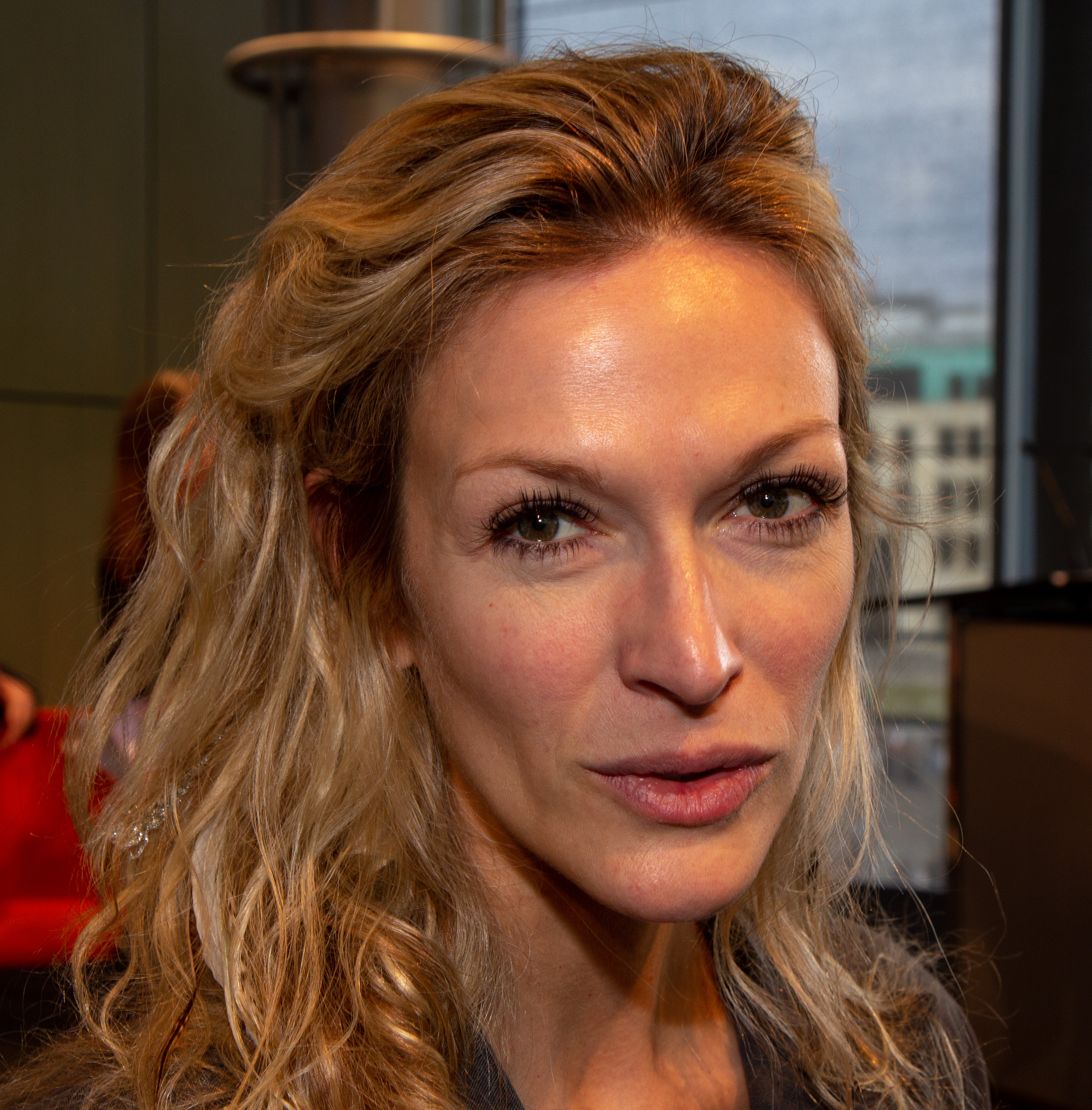
Portrait of Mia Florentine Weiss

Mia Florentine Weiss (born 1980 in Würzburg) is a German conceptual and performance artist. Her work encompasses various artistic disciplines such as performance, text, blood, installation, sculpture, objets trouvés, photography and film.

Her work has been shown in Museums and Art fairs internationally. Her sculptural ambigram Love Hate has travelled Europe as a symbol of peace and a change of perspective.

== Selected exhibitions ==
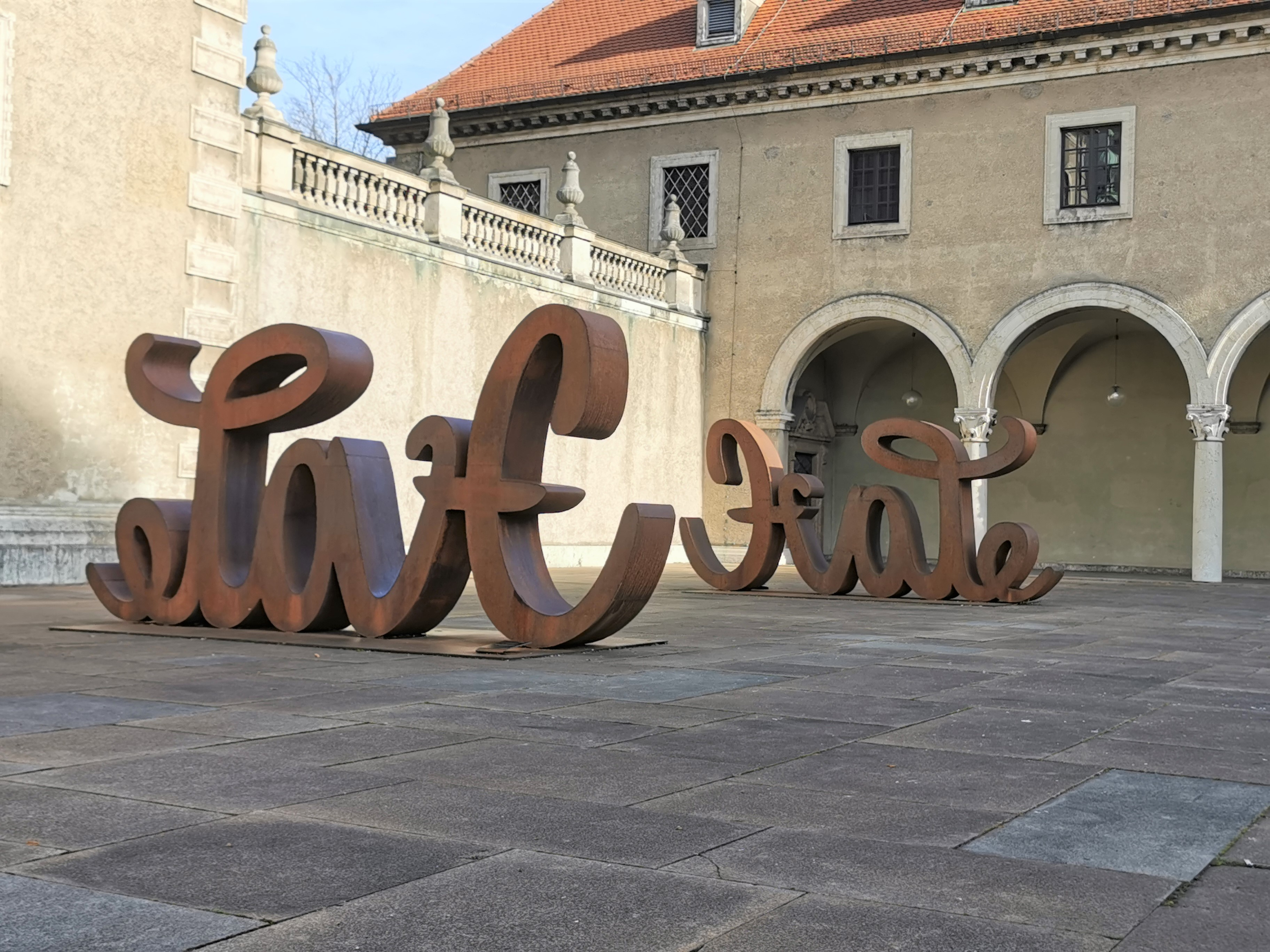
"Love Hate" ambigram sculpture in Munich, Germany, 2020

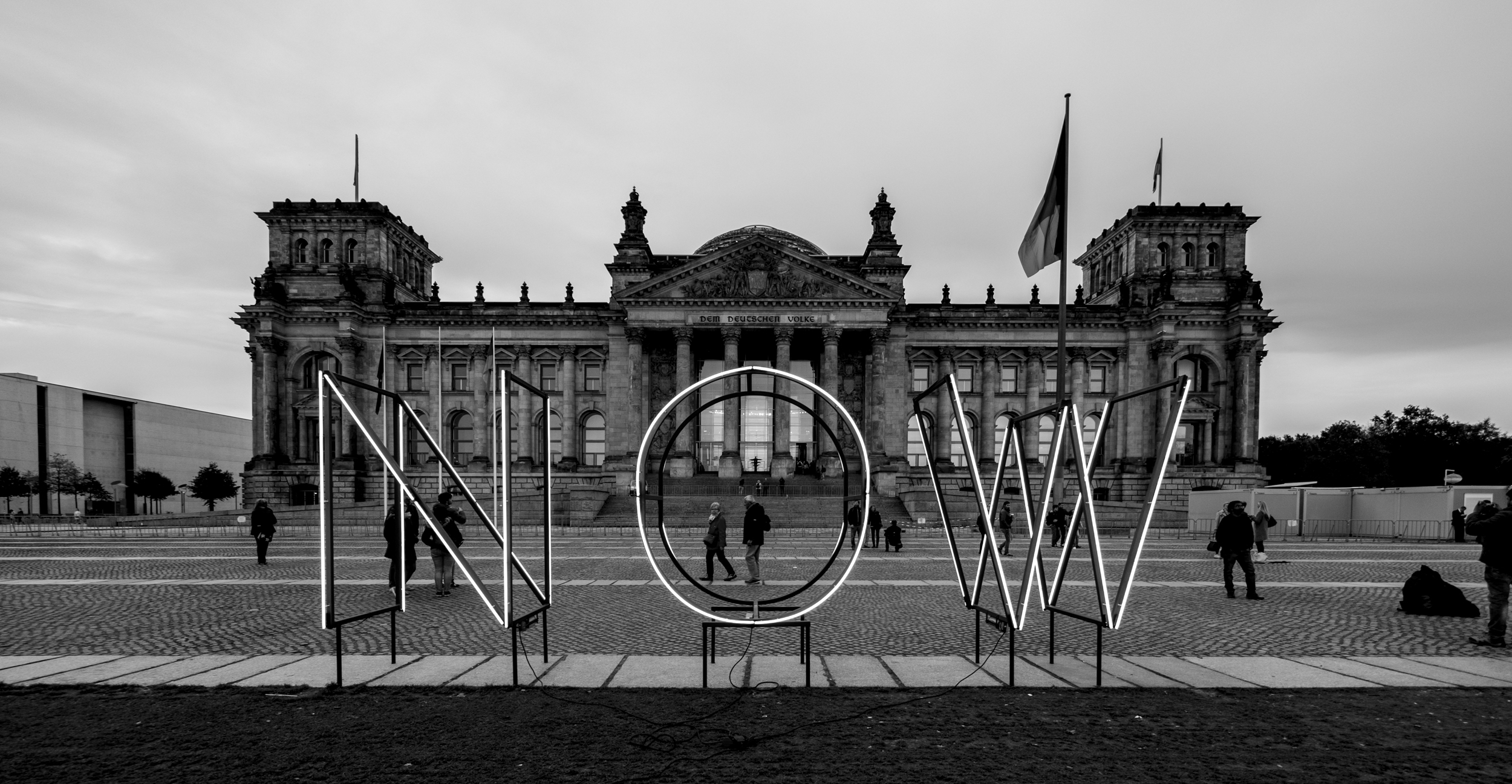
Mia Florentine Weiss's installation "Now / Won" in front of the Reichstag building, Berlin, Germany, 2017

Weiss created a sculpture which can be either read as Love or Hate depending on which side it is viewed from. Since 2018, she has run a pro-European campaign #LOVEUROPE with the Love Hate sculpture in different countries in and outside Europe: Germany, Austria, Belgium, France, Russia, Czech Republic.

In June 2018, her work was included in Die BUNTE Art in the Museum of Urban and Contemporary Art in Munich, Germany.

In 2018 she was part of the URBAN NATION Artist in Residence Programme in the Urban Nation Museum for Urban Contemporary Art in Berlin (Germany).
