= Pew Center for Arts & Heritage =

Nonprofit organization based in Philadelphia, Pennsylvania

The Pew Center for Arts & Heritage
- Established: 1989
- Executive Director: Christina Vassallo
- Staff: 14
- Address: 1608 Walnut Street, 18th Floor; Philadelphia, Pennsylvania 19103
- Location: Philadelphia, Pennsylvania, US
- Website: www.pewcenterarts.org

The Pew Center for Arts & Heritage is a nonprofit grantmaking organization and knowledge-sharing hub for arts and culture in Philadelphia, Pennsylvania, US established in 2005. In 2025, Christina Vassallo was named its second executive director, following Paula Marincola. The Center receives funding from The Pew Charitable Trusts and makes project grants in two areas, Performance and Exhibitions & Public Interpretation, as well as awarding grants to individual artists through Pew Fellowships. In 2021, the Center announced the introduction of Re:imagining Recovery grants to assist in COVID-19 recovery, and in 2024 it introduced Evolving Futures grants to support institutions undertaking structural change to strengthen their sustainability.

== History and timeline ==
In 2005, The Pew Charitable Trusts brought seven programs—in dance, visual arts and exhibitions, heritage, cultural management, music, theater, and individual artist fellowships—together under one roof, as The Philadelphia Center for Arts & Heritage. The Center received its current name in 2008. These programs have since merged to form a single entity that awards grants throughout Greater Philadelphia. In 2013 the Center merged its Project Grant programs to create two new funding categories: Performance and Exhibitions & Public Interpretation. Since 1989, the Center has awarded over $200 million to artists and arts organizations in the Southeastern Pennsylvania region, which includes Bucks, Chester, Delaware, Montgomery, and Philadelphia counties.

The historical timeline for The Pew Center for Arts & Heritage is as follows:

- 1989: Philadelphia Music Project
- 1991: Pew Fellowships in the Arts
- 1993: Dance Advance
- 1995: Philadelphia Theatre Initiative
- 1997: Philadelphia Exhibitions Initiative
- 1998: Heritage Philadelphia Program
- 2001: Philadelphia Cultural Management Initiative
- 2005: Programs brought together as The Philadelphia Center for Arts & Heritage
- 2008: Center renamed The Pew Center for Arts & Heritage
- 2013: Center moves from seven to three funding areas: Performance, Exhibitions & Public Interpretation, and Pew Fellowships
- 2021: Center introduces Re:imagining Recovery grants to assist in COVID-19 recovery.
- 2024: Center awards Evolving Futures grants to provide risk capital for organizations to evolve and transform their business and operating models.

=== Pew Fellowships ===
Pew Fellowships is a funding program of The Pew Center for Arts & Heritage, established by the Pew Charitable Trusts in 1991, which offers direct support to individual Philadelphia-area artists across disciplines, annually awarding up to 12 unrestricted grants of $75,000. The Pew Fellowships provide artists with an economic freedom that presents the opportunity to focus on their individual practices over a considerable period of time—to explore, to experiment, and to develop their work. The program aims to elevate the quality and raise the profile of individual artistic work in Philadelphia's five-county region, to create a strong community of Pew Fellows, and to help them achieve their artistic and career goals by connecting them to additional resources in the field.

Pew Fellowships are by nomination only, and selections are made through a two-tier peer review process. Applications are first reviewed by discipline-specific panels, which select finalists to be reviewed by a final interdisciplinary panel. Panelists are artists and arts and culture professionals from outside of the Philadelphia area; chosen for their expertise, they serve for one year. See a full history of Pew Fellowships recipients.

Advancement grants were awarded to high-performing cultural organizations in the five-county Philadelphia region, and are intended to support organizations seeking to make lasting improvements to their programming, audience engagement, and financial health. Advancement grants were awarded from 2014 to 2017.

Evolving Futures grants provide risk capital for organizations to evolve and transform their business and operating models for greater future vitality, relevance, and sustainability.

== As hub for knowledge-sharing ==
Beyond its work as a cultural grantmaker in Philadelphia, the Center has established itself as a hub for knowledge-sharing beyond the region, working in the areas of artistic expression and cultural interpretation. To engage in an international arts dialogue, the Center develops and hosts a range of activities, which concern artistic production, interpretation, and presentation. Activities include lectures, symposia, and workshops, and commissioned scholarship to explore critical issues in the fields served by the Center. The Center's website houses a series of online essays and interviews, along with information about Center-funded events and grantees.

A multidisciplinary group of cultural practitioners, scholars, and consultants from around the world have contributed to the Center's ongoing knowledge-sharing activities, including Jérôme Bel, Romeo Castellucci, Tacita Dean, Anna Deavere Smith, Thelma Golden, Anna Halprin, Barkley L. Hendricks, Bill T. Jones, Miranda July, Tony Kushner, Claudia La Rocco, Ralph Lemon, Paul Schimmel, David Lang (composer), Boris Charmatz, Ann Hamilton (artist), and many more.

Director, playwright, and actor Ain Gordon served as the Center's inaugural Visiting Artist from 2011–13, returning for an additional term in 2018–2019.

Kristy Edmunds, Executive and Artistic Director, Center for the Art of Performance at the University of California, Los Angeles, served as the Center's first Visiting Scholar. Dr. Suse Anderson, Museum Studies professor at George Washington University, current president at Museum Computer Network, and host of the Best of the Web Awards-winning podcast Museopunks, served as the Center's first Visiting Technologist in 2018-19.

== Publications and research ==
Center publications include Pigeons on the Grass Alas: Contemporary Curators Talk About the Field, The Sentient Archive: Bodies, Performance, and Memory, and What Makes a Great Exhibition?, an essay anthology that examines various components of exhibition-making, edited by Paula Marincola.

In 2011, the Center published Letting Go? Sharing Historical Authority in a User-Generated World, an anthology of thought pieces and case studies related to shared historical authority in museums and public humanities projects. The anthology explores subfields such as oral history and digital humanities to interrogate the changing nature of expertise in the museum field, and considers co-curation as a method for encouraging public engagement.

The Center's danceworkbook series offers web-based publications that explore the choreographic process. In February 2015, the Center launched the fourth iteration of the series, A Steady Pulse: Restaging Lucinda Childs, 1963–78.

In January 2017, the Center produced In Terms of Performance in collaboration with the Arts Research Center at the University of California, Berkeley. The online keywords anthology features essays and interviews from more than 50 prominent artists, curators, presenters, and scholars who reflect on common yet contested terms in interdisciplinary cultural practice.

In 2019, the Center published Site Read, an anthology in which "seven exhibition makers lay out the motivations, conditions, logistics, and consequences of shows they organized that now stand as icons of structural innovation in terms of site," published by Mousse Publishing.

== List of Pew Fellows (1992–2023) ==
Pew Fellows by Year
Year	Pew Fellows
1992	Hodari Banks, Steven Beyer, Sandra Brownlee, Syd Carpenter, Peter D'Agostino, Tina Davidson, Kent De Spain, Hellmut Gottschild, Steve Krieckhaus, Stacy Levy, Winifred Lutz, Odean Pope, LaVaughn Robinson (deceased), Annabeth Rosen, Judith Schaechter, Lily Yeh
1993	Nathalie Anderson, Bo Bartlett, Stephen Berg (deceased), Becky Birtha, Charles Burnette, Lisa Coffman, Linh Dinh, W. D. Ehrhart, Rafael Ferrer, Bruce Graham (deceased), Essex Hemphill (deceased), Iain Low, Sarah McEneaney, Christian Michel, Honor Molloy, Sonia Sanchez
1994	Charlotte Blake Alston, Charles Burns, Francis Davis, Ap. Gorny, Emmet Gowin, Louis J. Massiah, Kate Moran, Eileen Neff, Frances Negrón-Muntaner, Michael O'Reilly, Alice Schell, Carol Shloss, Judith E. Stein, Margie Strosser, Richard Torchia, Glen Weldon
1995	Christopher Bursk, Donald Camp, Lorene Cary, Chin Woon Ping, Thomas Dan, Mark Goodwin, Neysa Grassi, Hilary Harp, Major Jackson, Tristin Lowe, Virgil Marti, Stuart Netsky, Molly Russakoff, Susan Stewart, Denyse Thomasos, Isaiah Zagar
1996	Kariamu Welsh Asante, Yvonne Bobrowicz, Dave Burrell, Joseph Cashore, Rennie Harris, Jan Krzywicki, Bruce Metcalf, Todd Noe, James Primosch, Pang Xiong Sirirathasuk-Sikoun, Rudolf Staffel (deceased), Bobby Zankel
1997	Robert Asman, Barbara Bullock, Paul Fierlinger, Thomas Gibbons, Richard Harrod, Glenn Holsten, Alex Kanevsky, Peter Rose, Steve Rowland, Sheila M. Sofian, William Williams, Marian X
1998	Phoebe Adams, Steven Donegan, Daisy Fried, Michael Grothusen, Jahmae Harris, Mei-ling Hom, Homer Jackson, Shravin Shripad Mukherjee, James Mills, Karen E. Outen, Ron Silliman, Jeanne Murray Walker, Afaa Michael Weaver
1999	Carol Antrom, David Ellsworth, Jennifer Higdon, Michael Hurwitz, Teresa Jaynes, Kevin Kautenburger, Nicholas Kripal, Robert Maggio, Mogauwane Mahloele, Rebecca Medel, Milind Shripad Mukherjee, Benjamin Schachter, Eric Schoefer
2000	Frito Bastien, Pablo Batista, Frank Bramblett, Emily Brown, Terrence Cameron, Sheryl Robin David, Peache Jarman, Babette Martino, Mick Moloney, Alice Oh, Elaine Hoffman Watts, Kimmika L. H. Williams
2001	Tanya Maria Barrientos, Yane Calovski, Justin Cronin, Vincent David Feldman, William Larson, Enid Mark, Gabriel Martinez, Maria Teresa Rodriguez, Laurence Salzmann, William Smith, Ron Tarver, Ranvijay Patwardhan, Shanti Thakur
2002	Muhsana Ali; A collaborative team of Gabriel Quinn Bauriedel, Dan Rothenberg, and Dito van Reigersberg (Pig Iron Theatre Company); Candy Depew, Rachel Blau DuPlessis, Lonnie Graham, Mytili Jagannathan, Swadhin Nevaskar, Teresa Leo, Whit MacLaughlin, Caden Manson, Trapeta B. Mayson, Thaddeus McWhinnie Phillips, Mark Shetabi
2003	Kim Arrow, Tyrone Brown, Uri Caine, Andrea Cooper, Linda Cordell, Jim Hinz, Roko Kawai, Michael Olszewski, Toby Twining, Kukuli Velarde, Anna Weesner, Jan Yager
2004	Robert Crowder, Francis Di Fronzo, Mufulu Kingambo Gilonda, Tanya E. Hamilton, Sarvam Nevaskar, Hipolito "Tito" Rubio, Rebecca Rutstein, Losang Samten, Wu Peter Tang, Jackie Tileston, Nicholas Wardigo, Rebecca Westcott, Justin Witte
2005	Barbara Attie and Janet Goldwater, Astrid Bowlby, Pablo Colapinto, Gerald Cyrus, Jr., Cheryl Hess, M. Ho, Beth Kephart, Jay Kirk, Shawn McBride, Filmon Mebrahtu, Joshua Mosley, Zoe Strauss
2006	David Brick, Andrew Simonet, and Amy Smith (Headlong Dance Theater), Nava Etshalom, Nadia Hironaka, Jena Osman, Pepon Osorio, Bob Perelman, Scott Rigby, Tobin Rothlein, Robert Smythe, Geoffrey Sobelle, Lamont Steptoe, Elaine Terranova
2007	Charles O. Anderson, King Britt, Nicole Cousineau, Fritz Dietel, Ed Bing Lee, Gerald Levinson, Adelaide Paul, Peter Paulsen, Jamey Robinson, Kate Watson-Wallace, Dorothy Wilkie, Julie York
2008	Charles Burwell, J. Rufus Caleb, Matthew Cox, Russell Davis, Katharine Clark Gray, Nana Korantemaa, Felix "Pupi" Legarreta, Vera Nakonechny, Venissa Santí, Anne Seidman, Edgar J. Shockley III, Mauro Zamora
2009	Marc Brodzik, Anthony Campuzano, Sarah Gamble, Daniel Heyman, Ken Kalfus, Jennifer Levonian, Robert Matthews, Frances McElroy, Ben Peterson, Marco Roth, Ryan Trecartin, Nami Yamamoto
2010	William Daley, Max Apple, Melanie Bilenker, John Blake Jr., Kara Crombie, Orrin Evans, Germaine Ingram, Hanna Khoury, Tina Morton, Jenny Sabin, James Sugg, Charles "Chuck" Treece
2011	Charles Cohen, CAConrad, Jorge Cousineau, Joy Feasley, Chris Forsyth, Jane Irish, Tania Isaac, Pattie McCarthy, Brian Phillips, Tim Portlock, Matthew Suib, Jamaaladeen Tacuma
2012	Deron Albright, Marshall Allen, Daniel Blacksberg, Alex Da Corte, Margaret Foley, Matthew Mitchell, Dan Murphy and Anthony Smyrski of Megawords, Greg Osby, Jumatatu Poe, Catie Rosemurgy, Kevin Varrone, Lori Waselchuk
2013	Emily Abendroth, Kinan Abou-Afach, Hafez Javier Kotain, Sueyeun Juliette Lee, J. Louise Makary, Toshi Makihara, Jenn McCreary, Karen M'Closkey & Keith VanDerSys, Bhob Rainey, Frank Sherlock, Paul Swenbeck, Raphael Xavier
2014	Laynie Browne, Thomas Devaney, Michael Djupstrom, Fatu Gayflor, Leroy Johnson, Mary Lattimore, Travis Macdonald, Ted Passon, Susan Rethorst, Matt Saunders, J.C. Todd, Brent Wahl
2015	Micah Danges, James Ijames, David Scott Kessler, Susan Lankin-Watts, Caroline Lathan-Stiefel, Lauren Mabry, Chris Madak, Merián Soto, Rea Tajiri, Brian Teare, Benjamin Volta, Yolanda Wisher
2016	Andrea Clearfield, Christopher Colucci, Ryan Eckes, Sharon Hayes, Lela Aisha Jones, Mark Kendall, Jennifer Kidwell, Matthew Levy, Tiona McClodden, Jymie Merritt, Heidi Saman, Tokay Tomah
2017	Camae Ayewa & Rasheedah Phillips, Julia Bloch, Nichole Canuso, Brenda Dixon Gottschild, M. Nzadi Keita, Michael Kuetemeyer & Anula Shetty, Anuradha Mathur & Dilip da Cunha, Moon Molson, Tayarisha Poe, David Felix Sutcliffe, Annie Wilson, and Wilmer Wilson IV
2018	David Hartt, David Ludwig, Ken Lum, Diane Monroe, Quentin Morris, Jonathan Olshefski, Michelle Angela Ortiz, Ursula Rucker, Leah Stein, Zaye Tete, Alex Torra, and Rachel Zolf
2019	Jonathan Lyndon Chase, Dinita Clark, Kirsten Kaschock, Carolyn Lazard, Roberto Lugo, Karyn Olivier, Lisa Marie Patzer, Imani Perry, Maria Shaplin, Becky Suss, Tina Satter (Fellow-in-Residence), Julian Talamantez Brolaski (Fellow-in-Residence)
2020	Jacob Cooper, Shatara Michelle Ford, Jesse Harrod, Marissa Johnson-Valenzuela, Jaamil Olawale Kosoko, Airea D. Matthews, Bill Nace, Tom Quinn, Alex Smith, Alexandra Tatarsky, Raven Chacon (Fellow-in-Residence), Rhodessa Jones (Fellow-in-Residence)
2021	Emily Bate, Kayleb Rae Candrilli, angel shanel edwards, Rami George, Mark Thomas Gibson, Naomieh Jovin, Rich Medina, Brett Ashley Robinson, Kambel Smith, Didier William, Eva Wu, Rashid Zakat
2022	Camille Acker, Maia Chao, Sabaah Folayan, Denice Frohman, Adebunmi Gbadebo, Jesse Krimes, Odili Donald Odita, Asali Solomon, James Allister Sprang, Ada Trillo, Cesar Viveros
2023	Candice Iloh, Vernon Jordan, III, Carmen Maria Machado, Shehrezad Maher, Darius Clark Monroe, Vitche-Boul Ra, Samantha Rise, Karen Smith, Kristen Neville Taylor, Sumi Tonooka, Armando Veve, Phillip B. Williams
2024	Mikel Patrick Avery, Bettina Escauriza, Ralph Lemon, Michelle Lopez, Zac Manuel, Shavon Norris, Raúl Romero, Tyshawn Sorey, Chad E. Taylor, Stewart Throndike, Tshay, Rebecca Wright
2025	Jos Duncan Asé, Kendrah Butler-Waters, John E. Dowell Jr., Emma Copley Eisenberg, Jonathan González, Rose Jarboe, Nathalie Joachim, Rebecca Kanach, José Ortiz-Pagán, George Rodriguez, Sosena Solomon, Omar Tate

== See also ==
- Pew Fellowships in the Arts
- The Pew Charitable Trusts
- Paula Marincola
