= Joshua Mosley =

American artist and animator (born 1974)

- Born: 1974 (age 51–52); Dallas, Texas, United States, North America
- Education: The School of the Art Institute of Chicago
- Website: www.joshuamosley.com

Joshua Mosley (born 1974 in Dallas, Texas) is an American artist and animator.

== Career ==
Mosley is Professor and Chair of Fine Arts in the School of Design at the University of Pennsylvania.

Mosley's work is represented by Corbett vs. Dempsey in Chicago.

In 2005, Mosley was granted the Pew Fellowship in the Arts.

In 2007, Mosley received the Joseph H. Hazen Rome Prize in Visual Arts.

== Filmography ==
- Lindbergh, 1997
- Beyrouth, 2001
- Commute, 2003
- A Vue, 2004
- dread, 2007
- International, 2010
- Natura, 2011
- Jeu de Paume, 2014

== Exhibitions ==
=== Solo ===
- 2014 Joshua Mosley: Jeu de Paume, The Box at Wexner Center for the Arts, Columbus, OH
- 2010 Joshua Mosley: International, Donald Young Gallery, Chicago, IL
- 2010 Joshua Mosley: American International, Indianapolis Museum of Art, Indianapolis, IN
- 2009 Joshua Mosley: dread, Institute of Contemporary Art, Philadelphia
- 2009 Joshua Mosley: A Vue, Rochester Art Center, Rochester, NY
- 2008 Cerca Series: Joshua Mosley, Museum of Contemporary Art San Diego
- 2008 FOCUS: Joshua Mosley, Modern Art Museum of Fort Worth, Fort Worth, TX
- 2007 An Evening with Joshua Mosley, Modern Mondays, screening, Museum of Modern Art, New York, NY
- 2007 Joshua Mosley, dread, Donald Young Gallery, Chicago, IL
- 2005 Joshua Mosley, Commute, New Media Wall, Tufts University Art Gallery, Medford, MA
- 2004 Joshua Mosley, A Vue, Donald Young Gallery, Chicago, IL
- 2003 Animate Me No 1-3, Joshua Mosley, Museum für Gegenwartskunst, Basel, Switzerland
- 2002 DYGProjects: Joshua Mosley, Beyrouth, Donald Young Gallery, Chicago, IL
- 2001 New Work by Joshua Mosley, Institute of Contemporary Art, Philadelphia, PA

=== Group ===
- 2015 61st International Short Film Festival Oberhausen, Filmpalast Lichtburg, Oberhausen, Germany
- 2015 VIS Vienna Independent Shorts 12th International Short Film Festival, Vienna, Austria
- 2014 Whitney Biennial, Whitney Museum of American Art, New York, NY
- 2011 Close at Hand: Philadelphia Artists from the Permanent Collection, The Fabric Workshop and Museum, Philadelphia, PA
- 2011 Drawing room. Animated videos from the international art scene, EX3 Centre for Contemporary Art, Florence, Italy
- 2011 Here and Now: Prints, Drawings, and Photographs by Ten Philadelphia Artists, Philadelphia Museum of Art, Philadelphia, PA
- 2010 SITE Santa Fe Eighth International Biennial; The Dissolve, Site Santa Fe, Santa Fe, NM
- 2010 Live Cinema/Histories in Motion: Jennifer Levonian, Martha Colburn, Joshua Mosley, Philadelphia Museum of Art, Philadelphia, PA
- 2010 The Contemporary Figure: Anne Chu, Rodney Graham, Gary Hill, Andrew Lord, Josiah McElheny, Joshua Mosley, Bruce Nauman, Martin Puryear, Rosemarie Trockel, Rebecca Warren, Donald Young Gallery, Chicago, IL
- 2009 The Enlightenments, Joshua Mosley dread, Edinburgh International Festival, National Galleries of Scotland, The Dean, Edinburgh, Scotland
- 2009 Der Hund als Retter, Opfer und Held, Screening, Österreichisches Filmmuseum, Vienna, Austria
- 2008 Wild Signals. Artistic positions between symptom and analysis, group exhibition, Württembergischer Kunstverein Stuttgart, Germany
- 2008 Japan Image Forum, screening, Tokyo, Yokohama, Kyoto, Nagoya, Fukuoka and Niigata, Japan
- 2008 ArtProjx Hi Fi, screening, Anthology Film Archives NY
- 2007 Think with the Senses — Feel with the Mind. Art in the Present Tense, Venice Biennale, 52nd International Art Exhibition, Venice, Italy
- 2007 Contemporary Art and Cutting Edge: Pleasures of Collecting, Part III, Bruce Museum, Greenwich, CT
- 2007 Screen Deep, Australian Centre for the Moving Image, screening, organized by Artlink, Melbourne, Australia
- 2007 Image and Sound, Late at Tate Britain screening organized by Artprojx, London, England
- 2007 60th Festival Internazionale del Film Locarno, Play Forward section, Locarno, Switzerland
- 2007 Historias Animadas, Le Fresnoy, Studio national des arts contemporains, Tourcoing, France, Sala Rekalde, Bilbao, Spain, and Fundació "la Caixa", Barcelona, Spain
- 2006 Panorama Internacional de Cine Animadas, Cinema la Enana Marron, Madrid, Spain
- 2006 Forming Motion: künstlerische Animationsfilme, Directors Lounge, Berlin, Germany
- 2005 Sesiones Animades, Museo Nacional Centro de Arte Reina Sofía, Madrid, Spain
- 2005 51st International Short Film Festival Oberhausen, Filmpalast Lichtburg, Oberhausen, Germany
- 2005 Sesiones Animades, Centro Atlantico De Arte Moderno, Gran Canaria, Spain
- 2005 Sesiones Animades, Palacio de la Diputación in association with Animacor Festival, Córdoba, Spain
- 2005 L' Alternativa, 12è Festival de Cinema Independent of Barcelona, Centre de Cultura Contemporània de Barcelona, Barcelona, Spain
- 2005 9th Seoul International Animation Festival, Invited for Special Screening Program, Seoul, Korea
- 2004 50th International Short Film Festival Oberhausen, Filmpalast Lichtburg, Oberhausen, Germany
- 2003 Seriously Animated, Joshua Mosley, exhibition, Philadelphia Museum of Art, Philadelphia, PA
- 2003 Rodney Graham, Gary Hill, Joshua Mosley, exhibition, Donald Young Gallery, Chicago, IL
- 2003 Drawings: Rosemarie Trockel, Jana Sterbak, Richard Serra, Thomas Schütte, Charles Ray, Martin Puryear, Bruce Nauman, Joshua Mosley, Robert Mangold, Sol LeWitt, Rodney Graham, Anne Chu, Donald Young Gallery, Chicago, IL
- 2002 Art Basel Miami Beach – Art Video Lounge, Public Library Rotunda at Collins Park, Miami, FL
- 2002 Art Film, Art 33 Basel, screening, Stadtkino Basel, Basel, Switzerland
- 2002 Nuit Blanche/Nuit Vidéo, screening for the city of Paris, Paris, France
- 2000 Sound Video Film, exhibition; Donald Young Gallery, Chicago, IL

== Bibliography ==
- "Joshua Mosley". 2014 Whitney Biennial. Whitney Museum of Modern Art. 2014-03-15. Archived from the original on 2014-03-15.
