= Raphael Xavier =

Viazeen Ill Freeze
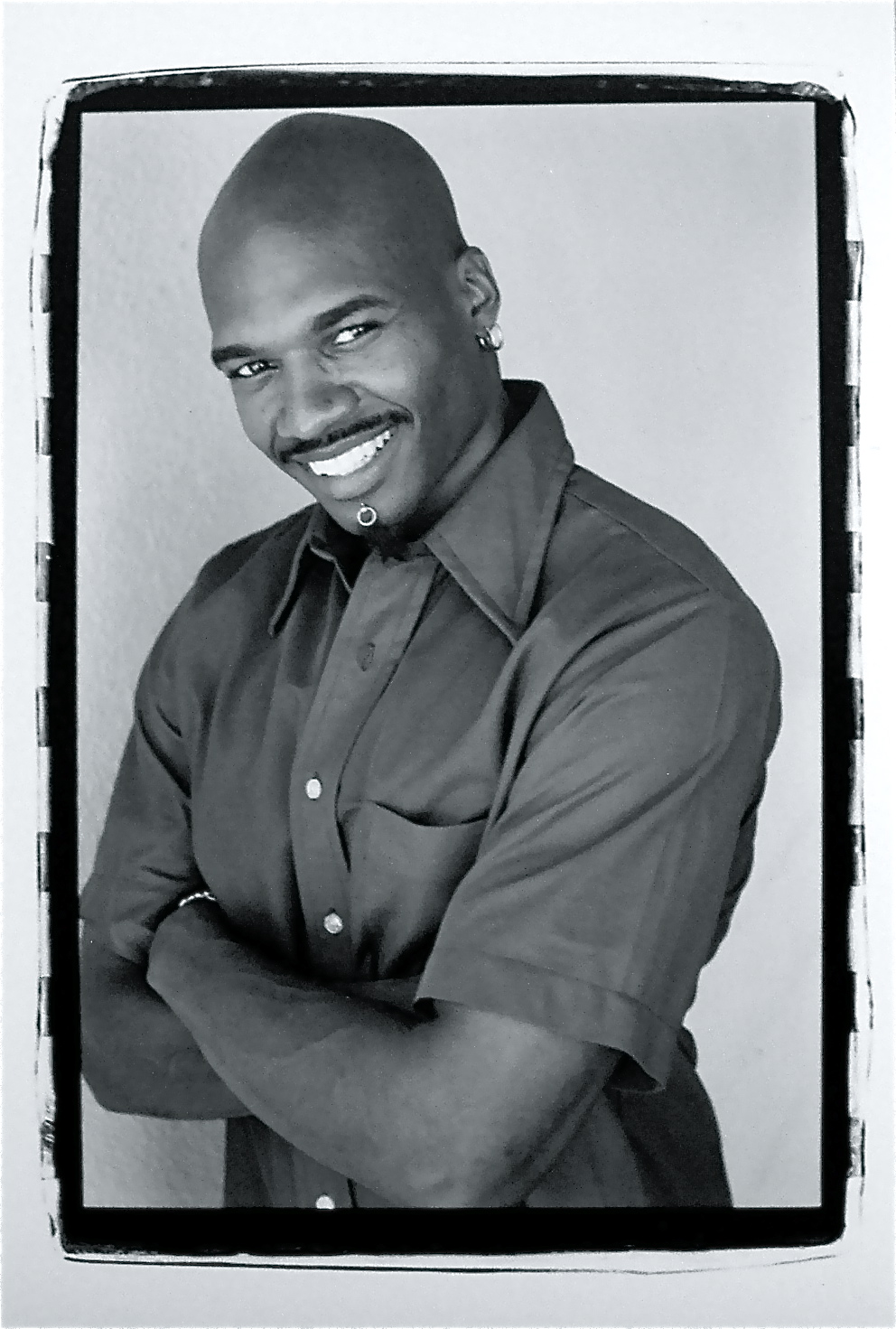
- Born: Raphael Xavier
- Occupations: Dancer, Rapper, Photographer/visual artist, Musician

Raphael Xavier Williams (born December 7, 1970) is a performance based artist. He is a professional breaker/dancer, rapper, music producer, photographer, author and multifaceted artist. He is known for re-invigorating the B-boying community in Philadelphia in the late 90's. He then became recognized as a theatre artist when he joined Rennie Harris Puremovement, one of the longest running Hip-Hop dance companies and their production of Rome & Jewels in 1997. He moved to the role of Tybalt shortly after. He would continue on to become a core member of the RHPM company and is now an alumnus. He has received many awards and recognition for his choreographic work from 1999 to present day and for various projects he has worked on. They include: music recordings and compositions, film, and photography. Raphael gives lectures and dance classes internationally on Hip-Hop, Breaking and its history. In 2013, Raphael was honored with a Pew Fellowships in the Arts award. He is a 2016 Guggenheim fellow and a 2016 United States Artist Knight fellow. Since 2014 he has been appointed lecturer at Princeton University teaching special topics in hip hop dance with a focus on Breaking and Comparative Hip-Hop Dance Practice and Aesthetics.

== The early years ==
Raphael Xavier was born in Wilmington, Delaware where he began his Hip-Hop dance journey and initiation into the culture. After seeing the New York City Breakers on the hit TV show Soul Train in the early 1980's, Raphael began Breaking with fellow students at Conrad Middle School. While it quickly grew into a phenomenon, at the same time it became hazardous to students and a liability to the institutions. Schools world wide banned the dance, forbidding students from practicing the form. Expulsion ensued and Raphael began hiding during school hours to practice the dance. Raphael was one of the few students to stick with it and turned the dreams of becoming a member of the famous "Scanner Boys" of Philly into a reality as he would work closely with their crew leader, Lorenzo-Prince Scarecrow-Rennie Harris, founder of Rennie Harris Puremovement.

== Dance career ==
Xavier first got his start in the dance industry by choreographing a piece for the Brandywine School of Ballet in 1995 after he was approached by Monarae Fraim to work with the school. He moved to Philadelphia, Pennsylvania in 1998 and was hired by Rennie Harris to tour as a dancer. He started traveling internationally with RHPM in a production called "Cool Heat Urban Beat," that included performances by: Urban Tap, RHPM, and DJ Miz. Raphael later performed and choreographed/produced his first evening length work as part of the CEC- New Edge Residency, in 2002 and founded a dance company called Olive Dance Theatre that same year. The company became a 501c3 non-profit, had a major funder and started touring within 2 months of its birth. In 2007, he left Olive Dance Theatre due to creative differences and a spine infection that left him temporarily paralyzed and without the use of his left side. That experience lead him to create a movement technique called Ground-Core, a Somatic dance technique that gives the dancer total awareness of their body and space. It has been taught at the University of Milwaukee, the University of California Irvine, the Stoney Brook University and as a credited course at UCLA. It is now implemented in all of his teachings and residencies to help expand the vocabulary of all dancers. Raphael has established Breaking as a traditional folk art in Philadelphia.

Xavier’s work, ‘The Unofficial Guide to Audience Watching Performance’, is an autobiographical work that has toured the U.S. 2013-2015. TUGTAWP is a full-length autobiographical dance that is the culmination of 30 years of experience in the Breaking art form and the hip-hop genre. With structuring and creative direction by Ralph Lemon, this deconstructs Xavier’s rap lyrics and breaking technique and, through rap cadences delivered as conversation, gives the audience insight into the maturing practitioner’s life journey as well as context for viewing the artist’s work.

While not precisely autobiographical, "Point of Interest" explores what it is like to be a "maturing" break dancer — not just from the perspective of how a dancer's body changes, but how the hip-hop dance scene has changed through the decades. 2016-2019 https://www.broadstreetreview.com/articles/annenberg-center-presents-raphael-xaviers-point-of-interest

Utilizing Jazz as a backdrop, XAVIER’S: The Musician & The Mover highlights African American improvisational street forms and traditions of freestyle with Breaking and Jazz. https://fjordreview.com/blogs/all/musician-mover-raphael-xavier

In Skiff: A Ryme on a Crimson Wave, Xavier contextualizes the work through the lens of Ernest Hemingway’s The Old Man and the Sea, the classic novel about a fisherman’s who reflects on his long life. With original spoken word, Xavier draws parallels between the fisherman’s search and his own journey to build a dance career utilizing the art form of Breaking. Skiff also draws inspiration from Winslow Homer’s The Gulf Stream, the iconic 19th century painting of a Black man in a small, rudderless fishing boat engulfed by a restless sea as sharks circle. https://www.dancecleveland.org/news-reviews/2025/04/13/classic-literature-meets-hip-hop-in-raphael-xaviers-brilliant-skiff-review

Xavier has worked with the artist: Matthew Barney (David Thompson) on several works. https://www.artforum.com/features/lillian-davies-matthew-barney-military-industrial-sports-complex-559625/ http://secondary.matthewbarney.net/fondation-cartier https://vimeo.com/826501942?share=copy https://airaspen.org/event/matthew-barney/ https://www.culturedmag.com/article/2024/06/07/fondation-cartier-matthew-barney-film/ https://medias.fondationcartier.com/fondation/documents/press/PRESS-KIT_MATTHEW-BARNEY_FC.pdf

== Photography career ==
Xavier started his photography career as a freelance photographer various magazines: Rap Pages, Blaze and The Source (magazine). One of his most notable shoots was of a fight between The Notorious B.I.G. along with his camp and an audience member that climbed on stage. He also shot events for P. Diddy and his Bad Boy Records Crew in their early stages. Raphael has an ongoing photography project, "No Bicycle Parking," that documents over 25 years of abandoned bicycles from around the world. It was featured in Bike Magazine 2003, the Sweeney Art Gallery's Re-Cycle-Bike Culture exhibit in 2010, The Painted Bride Art Center in 2013, Philadelphia's City Hall and several major on line publications. His book 'No Bicycle Parking' has been featured in several books stores around the country.

In addition to photography, Raphael wrote and directed a documentary film shot in Rio de Janeiro in 2007-2008 called "Chamber of Echoes." The film won best documentary short in an online film contest held by Filmaka. "Chamber of Echoes" was premiered at the BlackStar Film Festival in 2012.

His recent short narrative film, Swerve·Eli, is based on a true story and has won many film festival awards. It is currently streaming on Fawesome TV and Youtube. https://fawesome.tv/movies/10636831/swerve-eli https://www.imdb.com/title/tt22181284/reference/

As a music producer, he wrote and scored an original composition for a work choreographed by Rennie Harris for Alvin Ailey Dance Theatre, called "Home."

Raphael was part of the only winning team to clear the blind wall in the short lived T.V. game show Hole in the Wall (U.S. game show) and won $50,000. https://www.dailymotion.com/video/x88b9rq Hole in the Wall (American game show)
