= Enid Mark =

Enid Mark (1932 in New York City – September 30, 2008 in Philadelphia) was an American artist and small-press publisher.

== Life ==
She attended the High School of Music & Art in Manhattan and Smith College, where she studied English literature and studio art. She pursued painting and print making in the early years of her career, and came to favor the technique of photolithography. In 1986, Enid Mark founded the ELM Press, which is devoted to publishing finely crafted limited edition artist's books that feature hand-lithography, letterpress printing, and archival hand binding. Her work has been acquired by over a hundred public collections in the United States, Canada, England, and Israel.

Enid Mark received a 2006 Fellowship from the Pennsylvania Council on the Arts in recognition for her work in book arts. Among her other honors are a Pew Fellowship in the Arts (2001), and the Leeway Foundation Award for Achievement (2002). In 2004, her book, "The Elements" was awarded the 9th Biennial Carl Hertzog Award for Excellence in Book Design from the University of Texas/El Paso.

Enid Mark's work explores the relationship between text and image. The texts of most of her books are works by contemporary American women poets. Each of Mark's books is devoted to a theme (such as travel, mythology, or botany). Mark selects poems that reflect that theme and develops images to complement those poems.

== Books ==
Sarah Mortimar and Sarah Black, eds. The Bewildering Thread. With lithographs by Enid Mark. Wallingford, PA: Elm Press, 1986.
