= Virgil Marti =

American visual artist (born 1962)

- Born: 1962 (age 63–64)
- Citizenship: American
- Known for: Installation artworks, sculpture

Virgil Marti (born 1962) is an American visual artist recognized for his installations blending fine art, design, and decor from a range of styles and periods. Marti’s immersive sculptural environments, often evoking nature and the landscape, combine references from high culture with decorative, flamboyant, or psychedelic imagery, materials, and objects of personal significance.

The artist’s sculptures and installations have been featured in museums and galleries internationally since the 1990s. Marti was selected to participate in the 2004 Whitney Biennial. The artist has been awarded the Art Matters Fellowship, the Pew Fellowship in the Arts, the Pennsylvania Council on the Arts Fellowship, the Louis Comfort Tiffany Foundation Award, and the Joan Mitchell Foundation Award. Marti was the second invited artist in the Katherine Stein Sachs and Keith L. Sachs Curator Program at the Institute of Contemporary Art at the University of Pennsylvania. Marti was a Master Printer and Project Coordinator at the Fabric Workshop and Museum, Philadelphia, PA. The artist has been a Senior Visiting Critic in the MFA Program at the Pennsylvania Academy of Fine Art, a lecturer at the University of Pennsylvania, and a faculty member at Tyler School of Art.

== Education ==
Marti received a B.F.A in painting from the School of Fine Arts at Washington University, and an M.F.A. in painting from Tyler School of Art at Temple University. In 1990 Marti studied at the Skowhegan School of Painting and Sculpture.

== Early work ==
Marti was interested in challenging distinctions between fine art and decoration while studying painting at Tyler School of Art. He began stretching patterned fabrics onto customized painting stretchers creating painting-sculpture hybrids, some of which visually approximated cushions or furniture. Marti also stretched the fabric directly onto the wall, achieving the effect of wallpaper and forming an environment for the objects he was making. Evolving from this early work, Marti experimented with designing and printing his own wallpaper while an apprentice at Philadelphia’s Fabric Workshop and Museum in 1992. During this time, the artist produced his well-known work, Bully Wallpaper (1992) -- black-light sensitive “psychedelic-colored wallpaper” in French toile style, which in place of pastoral scenes, had yearbook portraits of all the boys who had tormented Marti in junior high school printed among its floral patterns. The writer Samantha Dyllan Mitchell notes, “this project is a clear predecessor to [Marti’s] later endeavors, combining a serious devotion to style and design throughout history with a distinctly personal contemporary perspective.” Marti’s Bully Wallpaper (1992) was first shown in the boiler room of the Community Education Center, Philadelphia and was conceived with this space in mind. The work was later exhibited at the Paley Gallery, Moore College of Art and Design, Philadelphia in 1992. In 1999 the Holly Solomon Gallery displayed Marti’s Bully Wallpaper at the Armory Show. In 2009 it was installed in the men’s room of Philadelphia’s Fabric Workshop and Museum while Marti was a resident artist.

In the early 1990s, Marti further incorporated decor into his artistic practice through collaborations with the artist Stuart Netsky. Netsky and Marti sewed fabric pillow shams embroidered with “one-line quotations culled from notorious figures of pop culture.” These Shams, presented as part of an installation, were a “tongue-in-cheek” commentary on queer culture and interior decoration.

In 1995, Marti transformed a prison cell at the disused Eastern State Penitentiary in Philadelphia for the exhibition Prison Sentences: The Prison as Site/The Prison As Subject, organized by Julie Courtney and Todd Gilens. Marti’s site-specific installation, For Oscar Wilde, was an homage to the writer imprisoned for moral indecency in 19th-century England. Marti decorated the prison cell in a “William Morris-inspired design of Wilde’s day and fashioned an aesthetically pleasing cell...with beauty as one of its central themes.” Nature, both organic and artificial, dominated Marti’s installation -- “a meandering path” made from a border of silk lilies in full bloom lead to the doorway of the cell where the walls were covered with silkscreen printed floral wallpaper of the artist’s design.

== Immersive installations ==
Marti fabricated a full-scale immersive domestic environment for his first major installation created for the group show You Talkin’ To Me (1996) at the ICA Philadelphia. A version of this installation, Hot Tub (1998) was shown New York City’s Thread Waxing Space in 1998. Marti’s installation transformed the gallery into a “brazenly tacky” domestic interior set in the 1970s complete with a hot tub, “smoked mirrors, electric candle flames, and deep-pile shag”. Artforum critic Frances Richard notes, “In Marti’s deftly kitschy installation,...a number of interesting issues coalesce—domestic space as social palimpsest, the Warholian appeal of mass-produced taste, and an appreciation for what curator Lia Gangitano refers to as “the purgatory” of suburbia. Most satisfying, however, is Marti’s understanding of the subtle ways in which a sculptural environment manipulates the physical perceptions of its audience.”

For his 2001 solo exhibition at the Pennsylvania Academy of Fine Art, juxtaposed with the museum’s 19th-century architecture designed by Frank Furness, Marti installed fluorescent wallpaper glowing under black-light, depicting a ‘psychedelic landscape’ of palm trees and waterfalls, which artist and critic Eileen Neff observed -- 'caused a visceral jolt'. Neff writes, “the scene announced the kind of botanical anomalies Marti finds in the recollected landscapes of Frederic Church as well as the geographical peculiarities in some panoramas of nineteenth-century ‘scenics.’ But Marti’s take on transporting wallpaper also evoked the psychedelic vernacular of the ’60s and ’70s and awakened the viewer's sense of nostalgia.”

By “pushing the decorative to visceral extremes, usually leading back to nature in some distorted form,” Marti’s installations offer a context where elements of decor and design recalled from his own upbringing or personal history, that are considered lowbrow, ugly, or flamboyant, can belong.

=== Grow Room ===
Marti’s 2002 immersive installation Grow Room conjuring both Whistler's Peacock Room as well as ‘2001: A Space Odyssey’, was the inaugural exhibition at New York’s Participant Inc. Marti lined the walls with reflective Mylar screen printed with images of artificial flowers—poppies, roses, hydrangeas, among images of macrame spiderwebs based on scientific photographs “of webs spun by spiders who had been fed drugs.” From the gallery’s ceiling, the artist suspended chandeliers made from colored resin casts of deer antlers with blossoms at the tips. Reviewing the exhibition for The New York Times, critic Holland Cotter notes, “the outcome is a merging of pop culture, art history, weird science and adolescent fantasy.”

Marti presented a second version of Grow Room at the 2004 Whitney Biennial.

Marti also used reflective mylar screen printed with images of flowers and macrame spiderwebs illuminated by colorful resin antler chandeliers in his installation The Flowers of Romance (2003) at the Institute of Contemporary Art, Philadelphia. Marti presented a version of this installation in a group exhibition at The Andy Warhol Museum, Pittsburg in 2004.

== Installations incorporating artworks from museum collections ==
=== Set Pieces ===
In 2010, Marti was asked to curate an exhibition for the ICA Philadelphia. Utilizing his process for creating his own artworks, Marti mined the Philadelphia Museum of Art’s collection and restaged paintings, decorative art, and sculpture “knowingly confusing high and low, period and contemporary, formal and informal design.” Marti’s arrangements were informed by some of his favorite films including ‘Citizen Kane’, ‘Last Year at Marienbad’, ‘The Bitter Tears of Petra von Kant’, ‘L’Avventura’, and 'Nashville'.

=== Matrix 167 Ode to a Hippie ===
Marti’s 2013 solo exhibition at the Wadsworth Atheneum, Hartford, CT, MATRIX 167 Ode to a Hippie, “explored the lingering romantic notions” of the English Romantic poet John Keats and American artist Paul Thek - both sources of creative inspiration for Marti. Marti’s site-specific installation included Keats’ death mask which is held in the collection of the Atheneum as well as the poet’s life mask borrowed for the exhibition from a private collection. Marti’s pairing of Keats’ life and death mask was inspired by Thek’s installation The Tomb (1967), later known as Death of a Hippie. Marti’s Wadsworth installation featured his wall-mounted “looking glasses” - ornate mirror-shaped forms referencing late 18th century Chippendale-style mirrors. Marti’s ‘mirror’ façades have a trompe l’oeil wood grain surface and silver finish that captures only subtle shifts in light, thwarting the expectation of a true reflection. Marti tints the mirrors in horizontal bands, “suggestive of Color Field paintings”, using colors that reference a range of inspirations including the dramatic skies in the paintings of Frederick Church, Thomas Cole, and James Hamilton, as well as “1960s counter-culture aesthetics.” The Wadsworth installation “explored life and death" through an inventive evocation of an English garden with shrines, a faux natural setting embellished with “hippie-craft” elements, alongside Marti's sculptural faux wood furniture made from cement.

Marti re-presented the Keats death mask in Forest Park, the artist’s 2014 solo exhibition at Locks Gallery, Philadelphia. A catalogue accompanied the Locks Gallery exhibition with an essay by art critic Hilarie Sheets.

== Other exhibitions ==
In 2007, Marti exhibited sculptures in the form of bright, ornate chandeliers and dramatic gold 'bone curtains' in a joint exhibition with artist Pae White at the Hirshhorn Museum and Sculpture Garden.

In 2017, Marti’s work was featured in the Barnes Foundation’s exhibition, Person of the Crowd: The Contemporary Art of Flânerie. The artist created two identical circular 'poufs' --banquettes-in-the-round upholstered in a mixture of textured fabrics. Marti’s poufs often function as symbolic portraits in the artist’s installations. Marti titled the Barnes’ work Doppelganger (2017), installing one of the plush poufs in the Barnes Collection Gallery for the duration of the exhibition, while its 'twin' traveled to four indoor and outdoor locations across the city of Philadelphia.

Marti also included fabric poufs, ‘looking glasses’, and faux swag wallpaper in the 2019 group show Less is A Bore curated by Jenelle Porter at the ICA Boston.

In 2019, Marti was the subject of a solo exhibition at the John Michael Kohler Arts Center, Sheboygan, WI. An element of landscape connected the works in the exhibition, which had at its center, a glass terrarium that Marti created in the 1970s, surrounded by bric-a-brac objects collected by the artist, a ‘horizon colored’ candle, stretched soda bottles, fabric poufs, a chandelier, and tire with a rainbow trim.

== Public artworks ==
In 2000, Marti’s large-scale public artwork Couch (2000), a 30-foot long upholstered sofa with tasseled throw pillows was installed in the Ardmore Station, Ardmore, PA. In 2013 Marti’s large-scale sculptural installation Five Standards (Dazzle) was permanently installed at Philadelphia’s Navy Yards. Marti’s sculpture Anomalous Cloud made of polished stainless steel and mirrored acrylic, suggesting an “abstracted thought bubble”, floats like a “geometric cloud” from the ceiling of the 36th floor of the Comcast Technology Center building in Philadelphia. A chandelier by Marti is on long-term loan to the ICA Philadelphia and is currently installed in the entrance to the museum.

== Exhibitions ==
Virgil Marti's work has been exhibited at institutions including White Columns, New York; The Andy Warhol Museum, Pittsburgh; Pennsylvania Academy of Fine Art, Philadelphia; the Fabric Workshop and Museum, Philadelphia; The Whitney Museum of American Art, New York; The Frances Young Tang Teaching Museum, Saratoga Springs; the Hirshhorn Museum and Sculpture Garden, Washington DC; the Institute of Contemporary Art, Boston; the Institute of Contemporary Art, Philadelphia; Participant Inc., New York; the Philadelphia Museum of Art, Philadelphia; Visual Arts Center, Richmond; the Wadsworth Atheneum, Hartford; Wheaton Arts and Cultural Center, Millville; Montreal Biennial, Montreal; The Galleries at Moore College of Art and Design; the Barnes Foundation, Philadelphia; MoMa P.S. 1, New York. Marti has had exhibitions at the Holly Solomon Gallery, New York; Elizabeth Dee Gallery, New York; and Locks Gallery, Philadelphia.

== Personal life ==
Born in Saint Louis, Missouri in 1962, Marti currently lives in Philadelphia.
