= Lonnie Graham =

Lonnie Graham is an American fine art photographer, professor, installation artist, and cultural activist investigating the methods by which the arts can be used to achieve tangible meaning in peoples lives. He is Professor of Visual Art at Pennsylvania State University in University Park, near State College, Pennsylvania. He has been the executive director of PhotoAlliance (San Francisco) since August 2019. In January 2013, Graham spoke at the TEDxPSU symposium. His talk is available for streaming through YouTube.

== Early studies ==
Lonnie Graham studied graphic design and commercial photography at the Ivy School of Professional Art in Pittsburgh, Pennsylvania. In 1976 he studied fine art photography and drawing at the Nova Scotia College of Art and Design in Halifax, Nova Scotia where he attended private sessions with photographer Robert Frank and critiques by art critic Donald Kuspit. In 1977 he traveled to the San Francisco Art Institute, and studied with Linda Connor, Jack Fulton, Regan Louie, and Henry Wessel. He was assistant to Larry Sultan and pioneering visual anthropologist John Collier Jr. Graham was mentored in large format photography by Pirkle Jones, close friend and colleague to Ansel Adams who made frequent visits to the Art Institute.

== Later career ==
From 1990 to 1997 Graham was director of Photography at Manchester Craftsmen's Guild in Pittsburgh, Pennsylvania, an urban arts organization founded by William Strickland, Jr. dedicated to arts and education for at risk youth. Graham developed innovative pilot projects including the Arts Collaborative, which merged an art and academic curriculum. This program attracted the attention of First Lady Hillary Clinton who visited the site, and honored it as a National Model for Arts Education. Professor Graham has served as a panel member and site visitor to the Commonwealth for the Pennsylvania Council on the Arts. He also served in a similar capacity at the national level for National Endowment for the Arts in Washington, DC.

From 2001 until 2003 he held the post of visiting instructor of graduate studies at San Francisco Art Institute, in San Francisco, California. In 2002, Kimberley Camp, Executive Director of the Barnes Foundation in Merion, Pennsylvania invited Graham to conduct an oral history of the Barnes. He was later made instructor of special programs and continued to teach at the Barnes until 2007. From 2007 until 2009 Graham was the acting associate director of the Fabric Workshop and Museum.

Influence of Graham: One former student, Jeremy Dennis, is a Native American artist who currently engages with issues of diversity and inclusion. He works on his native land in New York, where he explores ideas of myth and mythology. Dennis uses his art as a platform to raise awareness among members of the public about the social disruptiveness of their actions, and to urge people to interact with other cultures in respectful ways. Another former graduate student, Brian Gaither, has embraced some of Graham's teachings by returning to his hometown of Pittsburgh, where he continues to use art to connect constituents within his community, and focuses on issues surrounding race. And, after working with Graham in his “Art and Social Activism” class, another student, Corrina Mehiel, went on to become the director of a Harrisburg nonprofit; to teach in Cincinnati; to work as a community organizer in India; and, before her untimely death in March 2017, to work with artist Mel Chin to address issues of lead-free drinking water in elementary schools.

== African and Asian trips ==
Beginning in 2003 Graham began collaborative photographic expeditions to India, Ethiopia, and Iceland with photographer Linda Connor. He traveled with Jack Fulton to India, Nepal and Tibet in 2007.

Graham initiated a number of funded and self-funded trips to Africa and Asia that relate to artistic and cultural work he had undertaken in Philadelphia with the Fairmount Park Art Association and in Pittsburgh with the support of the Three Rivers Arts Festival. These projects were meant to prove that substantive change could be achieved in people's lives by making the arts a viable solution to common problems.

Toward this end, Graham was awarded a number of major commissions. In 1997, from Jeanne Pearlman at the Three Rivers Arts Festival in Pittsburgh, Pennsylvania, commissioned the "African/American Garden Project." This was part of a larger series of an exhibition called "Points of Entry" which included installations from artists, Ann Carlson, Group Material, Michelle Illuminato, Daniel J. Martinez, and Fred Wilson.

The African/American Garden project provided a physical and cultural exchange of urban single mothers from Pittsburgh, Pennsylvania, and farmers from a small farming village in Muguga, Kenya. As a result of this project, Graham built a series of urban subsistence gardens as a component to other projects.

In 2001, Mary Jane Jacob invited Graham to participate in the Spoleto Arts Festival in Charleston, South Carolina. She and Tumelo Mosaka curated "Evoking History," which included Graham's "Heritage Garden Project." Because Graham had visited traditional cultures in Africa and Asia he constructed larger projects including a number of artists and community members. The goal was to establish a method for modern artists to work in a traditional way, addressing the basic needs of a community.

From 2000 to 2010 Graham worked in Philadelphia, Pennsylvania with artists John H. Stone and Art Sanctuary director Lorene Cary on a project commissioned by the Fairmount Park Art Association, for Project H.O.M.E. in north Philadelphia. In addition to installations, projects and neighborhood events, the result of the commission was a mediation park, which was dedicated and gifted to the community in 2010.

In 1997 Lonnie was honored with a major commission for travel to Papua New Guinea to document the harvest of the Woowoosi tree used by the Maisen tribe to produce ceremonial tapa cloth. He later collaborated with curator Lawrence Rinder on an exhibition of photographs and artifacts produced from that expedition.

== Awards and honors ==
In the 1995 Colliers Encyclopedia yearbook, Graham was cited as an encyclopedic point of reference for his research and creative accomplishments in the field of installation art. He was also the recipient of a National Endowment for the Arts / Pew Charitable Trust travel grant for travel to Ghana. Graham is a four-time Pennsylvania Council on the Arts Fellowship winner. He has been nominated as a DuPont Fellow, and for the Cal Arts-Alpert Award, a Joan Mitchell Foundation Fellowship, and a USArtist Fellowship. He was awarded the Creative Achievement Award by the Pittsburgh Cultural Trust. Graham received a Pew Fellowships in the Arts. The Pew is one of the largest individual artist fellowships in the United States. In 2005, he was awarded the Hazlett Memorial Award, conferred the distinction of as Artist of the Year in the Commonwealth of Pennsylvania, and was presented with the Governor's Award by Governor Edward Rendell.

== Catalogue work ==
Graham designed the catalogue entitled "Countdown to Eternity," a collection of photographs of Dr. Martin Luther King Jr. by Benedict Fernandez, as well as a traveling exhibition of photographs. He also designed the catalogue for Carrie Mae Weems’ "Kitchen Table Series," exhibited at Hollins University in Roanoke, Virginia and is known to have worked with Weems collaboratively on other projects at the Fabric Workshop and Museum in Philadelphia, Pennsylvania, including the Adam and Eve folding screen entitled the "Apple of Adam's Eye," produced in 1992. He collaborated with David Lewis to produce a book about sculptor Thaddeus Mosley, "Thaddeus Mosley, African American Sculptor." Pyramid Atlantic Art Center, in Silver Spring, Maryland published his own "Friendship, Strength and Vitality" as a limited edition photogravure edition which resides in the Corcoran Gallery in Washington, DC and the collection of the Schomberg Center in New York City.

The catalogue accompanying the exhibition "A Conversation with the World" has been widely disseminated by Light Work in Syracuse, New York. This project was conceived by Graham and photographer Kevin Martin in 1986, and combines elements of social anthropology and fine art as it uses an interview component to engage participants who sit for a large format 4"x5" portrait made using polaroid type 55 positive/negative film. The project captures detailed and intimate portraits of individuals from various cultural and geographical backgrounds. Each participant is engaged in a structured conversation, designed to unearth deep insights into personal histories, values, and perspectives on global humanity. This innovative approach facilitates a direct, unmediated connection between the subject and the audience, allowing for an immersive experience that transcends conventional artistic boundaries. The portraits, coupled with excerpts from the interviews, are presented in a manner that emphasizes the singularity of each individual while highlighting the universal themes that emerge from their narratives. These themes often revolve around family, tradition, hopes, and fears, providing a rich tapestry of human experience that fosters empathy and understanding across cultural divides.

Graham was documented using this process in Houston, Texas at Rick Lowe's Project Row Houses in artist Round 19. "A Conversation with the World" has also been conducted and exhibited in San Francisco. He was commissioned by the San Francisco Art Commission for a public art project that was installed at the San Francisco City Hall and exhibited in public spaces around the city. The project was commissioned and presented in Calgary, Alberta, Eatonville, Florida and Oulu, Finland. In 2005 he was awarded a Mid Atlantic Arts Foundation Artists in Communities Grant under the auspices of the Fabric Workshop and Museum in Philadelphia, Pennsylvania to produce "A Conversation at the Table." This project invited over 50 artists and four arts organizations to collaborate on a project based on essential aspects of humanity. The project was completed and presented in 2006.

== Other work ==
The Queens Museum in New York also commissioned him to produce an international garden project as part of their "Down the Garden Path" exhibition presented in 2005. Lonnie begins all garden projects with the intention that they become self-sustaining, but the impact of his work is so much more powerful. Through the "Enlightenment" garden, due to gardening's need for teamwork, communication it helped change the relationship between the student and teachers, parents and the rest of the community. The garden gave the community a sense of responsibility and respect for others. Through the growth of vegetables it also showed the children the process of life, and the fragility of life. His work also brings communities together, including communities across borders. For example, "From Uncle Floyd's project ", brought people from two very different culture's together to experience each other's life as the Kenyan people from Karioi clan went to Homewood, Pittsburgh to meet with the gardeners. And conversely, people from Homewood travelled to Kenya, kairoi meet the Karioi and to help with the village gardening. His gardens break the distance between two different locations, and cultures whether it is near or far away. Whenever it is financially possible he always tries to pair up two sister countries. The Queens Museum garden, Jardines Gamelos de las Americas brought the bond between Queens, New York and Mexico. As he believes it is the real life experience that teaches how other cultures live. Other exhibitions include an exhibition of photographs at Goethe Institute, Accra, Ghana. La Maison de Etat-Unis, Paris, France produced a full-scale reproduction of one of the educational galleries he photographed for the Barnes Foundation. Graham has shown at the Toyota City Museum in Aichi, Japan. He exhibited a room-sized installation at the Smithsonian Institution in Washington, DC. Graham's work is included in the permanent collections of the Addison Gallery for American Art in Andover, Massachusetts and the Philadelphia Museum of Art.

In 2005 he collaborated with MacArthur Fellow Deborah Willis on "Framing the Diaspora", which resulted in an international conference of artists, photographers, and filmmakers held in Accra, Ghana.

My Fathers Table, This project is a 9 feet by 12 feet, fully furnished room created in 1995. It contains original artifacts from Graham's home. The centerpiece of this project is a handmade book: "Strength, Vitality, and Friendship", composed of native materials from east Africa. Large paper sheets are made to disintegrate as a metaphor for fathers failing memory.

Farm Stand is a 8 feet by 8 feet by 10 feet fully stocked farm store created in 2012. It is a memorial with John Stone for Green Acres exhibition at Cincinnati Contemporary. Acknowledgment and Reflection is a 10' x 10' room for slave quarters created in 2003. The site for the Acknowledgment component of the installation of the Spoleto triptych was originally intended to occupy these slave quarters. After repeated visits and profound spiritual provocation the artist was compelled to construct the installation across the breezeway in the main house. The entire site remains in and arrested state of decay, however visitors are invited to sit at this period desk and contemplate the contributions of generations of black people to Western culture and record them in the Journal provided. While seated the viewer can look out the window to the right and looked directly into the dining room of the "Big House" Project H.O.M.E was created in 2009 as a built in response to community input in north Philadelphia. It was a collaboration with John Stone and Lorene Cary under the auspices of the Fairmont Park Art Association Living in a Spirit House is nine by nine feet, fully furnished room/installation created in 1993. It contains original artifacts from artists home accompanied by reproduced period fabrics and wallpapers, produced at the Fabric Workshop, exhibited at the Smithsonian Institution, Washington, DC. Acknowledgement, Enlightenment, and Memorialization, curated by Mary Jane Jacob, installed as triptych during Spoleto festival. This installation served the Wilmot Frasier Elementary School and succeeded in providing food for the schoolchildren, thereby improving test scores, which helped to keep the school open for a number of years. Garden also functioned as an outdoor classroom utilized for lesions in English science and mathematics. The measurement of this fully functioning subsistence garden is seventy five by one hundred feet created in 2003.

Acknowledgement, Enlightenment, and Memorialization Acknowledgement, 2nd part of a triptych Installed for the Spoleto Festival. This installation was 14’ x 30', a full-size room with projections of Africans. Created in 2003, it was built to acknowledge the contributions of African-Americans enslaved to build maintain and care for the infrastructure of many parts of the United States. This installation features images of West Africans projected onto the walls of the great dining room of the Aiken Rhett estate in Charleston, South Carolina. Deep blood red velvet drapes were fabricated in the Victorian-style to symbolize the excessive lifestyle slaveholders maintained on the backs of their Negro servants. The golden rope drape ties can be seen as they lay loosened and cast aside. The blue silk sheers hung in the window are embroidered with the Ursa Major constellation which is the commonly used point of reference slaves would employ for their escape. This installation was dismantled after 3 days because of complaints from the plantation staff describing the installation as, “disturbing. Acknowledgement, Enlightenment, and Memorialization Memorialization is an installation that is open filed with sticks created in 2003. This work was installed to serve as a memorial for the scores of Africans cum Americans interred in this site in unmarked graves. This collaboration between sculptor, Thaddeus Mosley was fashioned after West African grave markers. The dedication was performed under a light rain in the southern afternoon heat to a crowd of 100 people. In the distance a woman sang Negro spirituals a cappella as she circumnavigated the hundred yard site. Surviving members of the plantation met and reconciled with surviving members of the slaves that were interned at this site. A reconciliatory poem was read by James Wiley professor of history at the Cooper Union for arts and sciences. Many wept.
