= Jackie Tileston =

American artist and painter (born 1960)

Jackie Tileston (born 1960, Manila, Philippines) is an American artist and painter. She is an associate professor of fine arts in the School of Design at The University of Pennsylvania. She is the recipient of the 2006 John Simon Guggenheim Memorial Foundation Fellowship in painting and the 2004 Pew Fellowship in the Arts.
