= Lamont B. Steptoe =

American poet (born 1949)

- Born: 1949 (age 76–77); Pittsburgh, Pennsylvania, U.S.
- Education: Temple University
- Occupations: Poet; photographer; publisher
- Writing career
- Notable awards: American Book Award (2005)

Lamont B. Steptoe (born 1949 Pittsburgh, Pennsylvania) is an American poet, photographer and publisher. Steptoe edited and published three collections of the late South African poet and activist, Dennis Brutus, under Whirlwind Press.

== Life ==
Steptoe was born and raised in Pittsburgh, Pennsylvania. He graduated from Temple University. He was a Vietnam veteran, and founder of Whirlwind Press.

== Awards ==
- 2005 American Book Award
- 1999 Literary Fellow for the Pennsylvania Council on the Arts
- 2002 Kuntu Writers Workshop Lifetime Achievement Award in Poetry, from founders Rob Penny and August Wilson
- 2014 Ambassador of the Republic of Užupis

== Works ==
- "Update on the Disembodied", Longshot Vol 22
- Kitchens of the Master. Iniquity Press/Vendetta Books. 1997. ISBN 978-1-877968-14-3.
- Mad Minute, Whirlwind Press, 1993
- Uncle's South Sea China Blue Nightmare. Plan B Press. 2003. ISBN 978-0-9728312-1-5.
- Cat Fish and Neckbone Jazz
- Dusty Road. Whirlwind Press. 1995. ISBN 978-0-922827-17-6.
- American Morning/Mourning. Whirlwind Press. 1990. ISBN 0-922827-01-X.
- Common Salt
- Trinkets and Beads
- Crimson river: poems , Slash & Burn, 1984
