= Stacy Levy =

American environmental artist

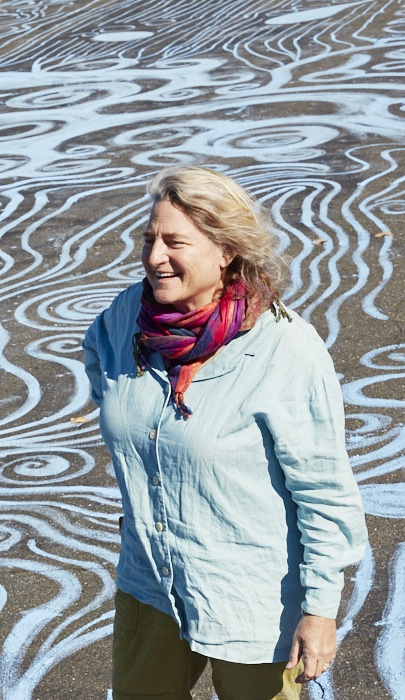
- Levy, standing in Missing Waters, 2020
- Born: 1960 (age 65–66); Philadelphia, PA
- Known for: Sculpture
- Movement: Environmental art
- Awards: Pew Fellowships in the Arts, Henry Meigs Environmental Leadership Award
- Website: stacylevy.com

Stacy Levy (born 1960) is an American sculptor who works with ecological natural patterns and processes, often using water and water flows as a medium. Many of her works address environmental problems at the same time that they make the functioning of the environment visible. Her studio is based in rural Pennsylvania, but she works on projects around the world.

== Early life and education ==
Levy grew up near Fairmont Park in Philadelphia and studied at the Architectural Association School of Architecture. She spent time in the 1980s working as an urban forester, managing urban forests for companies, parks and private individuals.

She graduated from Yale University with a BA in Sculpture, studied at Skowhegan School of Painting and Sculpture, and graduated from the Tyler School of Art at Temple University with a MFA in Sculpture.

== Career ==
External videos
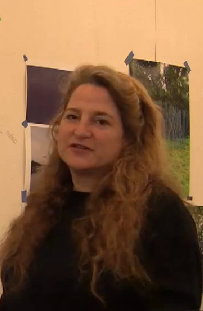
- "Calendar of rain started when somebody made a comment that it always rains on the weekends", Science History Institute (2013)
- A Rain Garden for Springside School (2010)
- David Rumsey Map Center Conference on Cartography (2023)

Stacy Levy uses the language of landscape and art to tell the ecological story of a site, drawing on both art and science. Her projects reveal the sometime hidden natural world in the urban environment. Stacy's work integrates art with site design to create memorable places alive with nature and sensation. Her projects distill the essence of nature and reveal its processes to the user. Stacy works closely with building architects, landscape architects, engineers, horticulturalists and soil scientists to create artworks that allow natural systems like the infiltration of rainwater, to function and thrive. Through a lyrical approach to natural science, Levy blends an understanding of sustainable design and ecological concepts and harnesses the ephemeral changes of weather and light with the lasting presence of sculpture.

From rivers to runoff, Levy has explored the many facets of water: urban watersheds, storm water, hydrologic patterns and water treatment. Her installation "Calendar of Rain" creates a year-long record of precipitation, collected daily in shimmering glass jars. Her project "Tide Poles" for the City of Yonkers' waterfront incorporates the use of LED technology to visually manifest the ebb and flow of the Hudson River tide. Her projects "Tide Field" and "River Rooms" at Bartram's Garden in Philadelphia offer visitors new ways to become more aware of and engage with changes in the river.

I'm trying to make a work that brings people down to meet the river, see the changes, so they might get to know it, and then they'll get to love it, and then they'll want to preserve it."–Stacy Levy

Levy has completed numerous rainwater pieces including a watershed rain terrace for Penn State University's new Arboretum, and a rain garden for Springside School with the Philadelphia Water Department and the Pennsylvania Horticultural Society. She has public commissions in New York, Seattle, Philadelphia, Tampa, Toronto and Niigata, Japan.

== Artistic works ==
=== Missing Waters, 2025 ===
Santa Fe, NM

Levy worked with local artists and students from New Mexico School for the Arts to create a large-scale transitory chalk and water map painted on surfaces throughout the Santa Fe Railyard echoing the path of lost rivers.

=== Diatom Lace pavers, 2023 ===
New York, New York

A new public esplanade featuring a paver arrangement called Diatom Pavers. The pavers are embossed with images of diatoms that live in the East River. Levy worked Judy Yaquin Li from NOAA Fisheries. The installation has 5,000 Diatom Lace pavers in clusters along the pedestrian path. The project won a 2025 Honor Award from The New York Chapter of the American Society of Landscape Architects

=== Collected Watershed, 2020 ===
Chesapeake Bay, Baltimore County, Maryland

Levy worked with Towson University professors and students collecting over 1,000 gallons of water from all the waterways in the area. She filled over eight thousand recycled glass jars, laying them out to build a 3D watershed map with water from the actual waterway in the jar, "so you can walk through the watershed like a giant."

=== Tide Fields, 2018 ===
Schuylkill River

This project showcased the six-foot tidal fluctuations with a series of current-driven buoys. The rising and falling tide reveals and conceals the buoys, drawing attention to the ebbs and flows of the river and creating "a liquid map of the Delaware watershed".

=== Rain Ravine, 2016 ===
Frick Environmental Center in Pittsburgh, Pennsylvania

In this Living Building Challenge Project, Levy worked with architects, landscape architects, and engineers to build a system where all the rainwater from the roof of the building ran through the artwork.

=== Spiral Wetland, 2013 ===
Lake Fayetteville, Fayetteville, AR

Spiral Wetland is an eco-art project supported by the Walton ArtCenter as part of the Artosphere Festival in Fayetteville, Arkansas on Lake Fayetteville.

Spiral Wetland is made with native soft rush, Juncus effusus, growing in a closed-cell foam mat anchored to the lake's floor. The plants help remove excess nutrients like nitrogen and phosphorus from the lake water, and the mat adds shade for fish habitat. Inspired by Spiral Jetty (1970), Robert Smithson's famous earthwork sited in the Great Salt Lake, Utah, this spiral is a working earthwork floating on the surface of the lake.

=== Tide Flowers, 2012 & 2023 ===
Hudson River Park, Piers 34 and 25, New York, NY (on hold) and Domino Park, Brooklyn NY

33 units 9' wide Marine vinyl, steel, polycarbonate plastic, foam.

The Hudson River is a tidal estuary, experiencing two high tides and two low tides approximately every 24 hours due to the gravitational influence of the moon. This tidal activity reflects the river's direct connection to the Atlantic Ocean.

Tide Flowers will register the tidal movement with a simple visual presence of brilliantly-colored flowers blooming at high tide and closing at low tide. Tide Flowers is made up of thirty-three flower units, each with six petals, attached to selected wooden piles on two piers. Twenty-five flowers will be placed in a field-like formation on selected pilings at the end of pier 25, visible from both the path and the new park. Eight additional tide flowers will be attached to pilings closer to the pathway to give park users a hint of the larger field of flowers beyond.

=== River Eyelash, 2005 ===
Three Rivers Arts Festival, Pittsburgh, PA

3,000 painted buoys radiate out from the bulkhead of the Point State Park, like an eyelash for the city. The eyelash continuously changes formation in response to wind direction, speed of the currents and boat wakes.

=== Kept Out, 2009-2010 ===
Schuylkill Center for Environmental Education, Philadelphia, PA. Part of Edible Landscapes, curated by Amy Lipton

Kept Out consists of a pair of deer exclosures, the fenced areas to keep deer out: one built near the artist's studio in a woodland in Pennsylvania's Ridge and Valley region and the other at the woodlands edge of Schuylkill Center for Environmental and Education in the Piedmont ecosystem. Both sites face a great deal of deer pressure.

=== AMD&Art Project, 1995 -2005. ===
Vintondale, Vintondale, PA

Collaboration with Julie Bargmann, Landscape Architect. Robert Deason, Hydrogeologist and T. Allan Comp Historian

Acid mine drainage pollutes hundreds of miles of streams in Pennsylvania. At Mine Number Six in Vintondale, in the coal mining region of south central Pennsylvania, artists, landscape architects, scientists and historians collaborated on ways to treat AMD while interpreting the coal mining history and the passive treatment processes. This project creates a public park and water treatment facility.

=== Watermap, 2003 ===
Friends' Central School, Wynnewood, PA

Tributaries of the Delaware and Schuylkill Rivers are deeply sandblasted into bluestone paved terrace. When it rains, the rainwater flows into the runnels of the tributaries and then into deeply inscribed Delaware River, creating a watershed in miniature.

=== Cloud Stones, 2004 ===
Mineral Springs Park, Seattle, WA

The highly polished black stone domes reflect the sky and the clouds formations. Text sandblasted around the domes tells of the types of weather which these cloud formations bring. The white domes have more of evening presence, and their text tells of the moon and stars. As the light fades at dusk, the white domes remain bright while the dark domes sink into the shadows.

=== Lotic Meander, 2007 ===
Ontario Science Centre's Project Art

"Lotic Meander" is a serpentine walkway that resembles a dried riverbed, located outside the Ontario Science Centre's Great Hall. Modelled on the meanderings of the Humber River, the snakelike stream is 91.4 metres long and winds along a path that takes up most of the Solar Patio. The piece is made from 116 granite slabs from India, and 8 nearly perfect hemispherical or hemiellipsoidal black domes carved from boulders imported from China. The highly polished domes are similar, in appearance, to the domes used to house surveillance cameras.

Along some of the curves of the path there are also nicely polished smooth round glass pebbles, in variously coloured translucent glass.

"Lotic" in the title refers to the ecosystems of different magnitudes of flowing water in nature.

== Example works ==
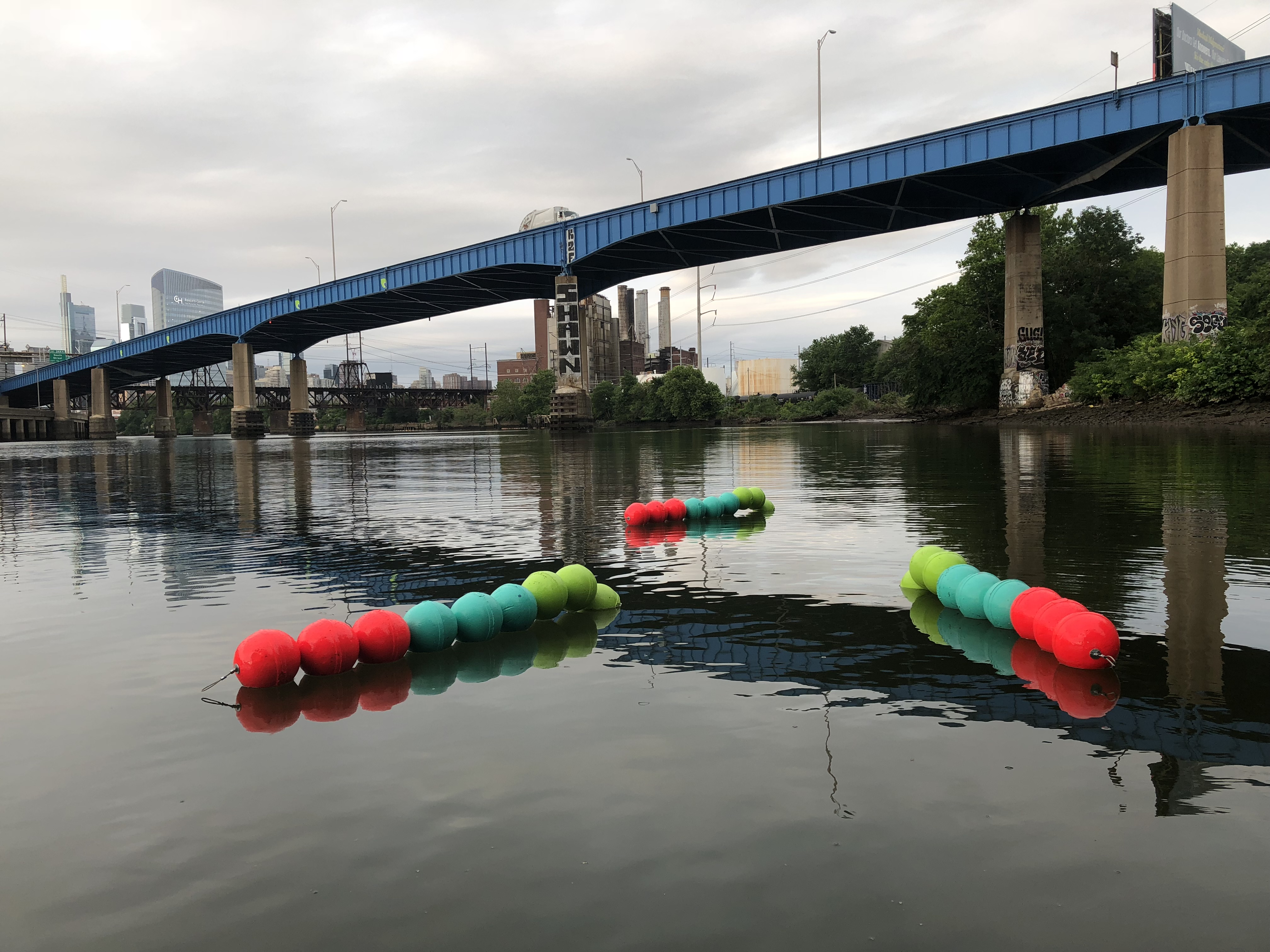
Tide Field

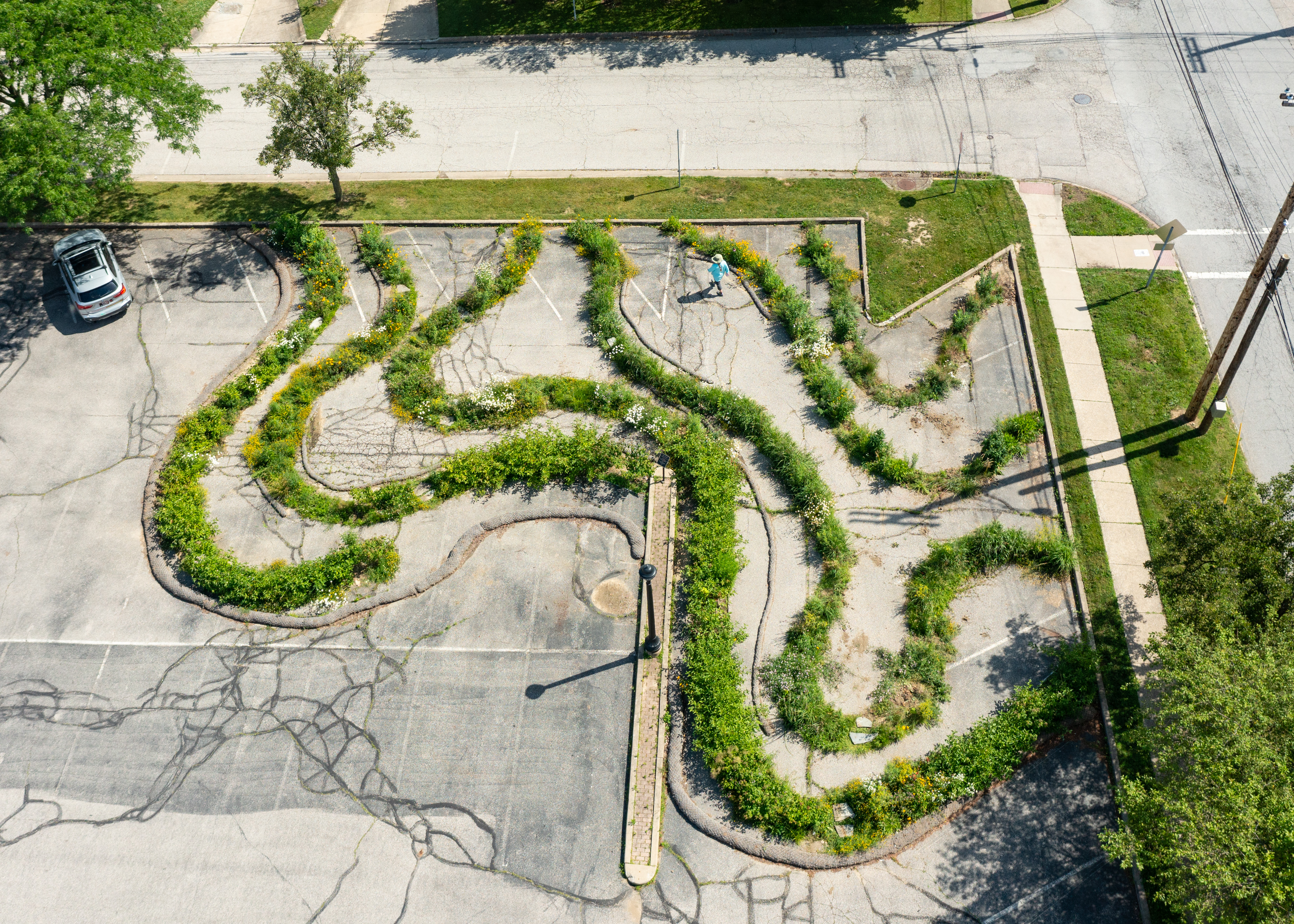
Topo Swale

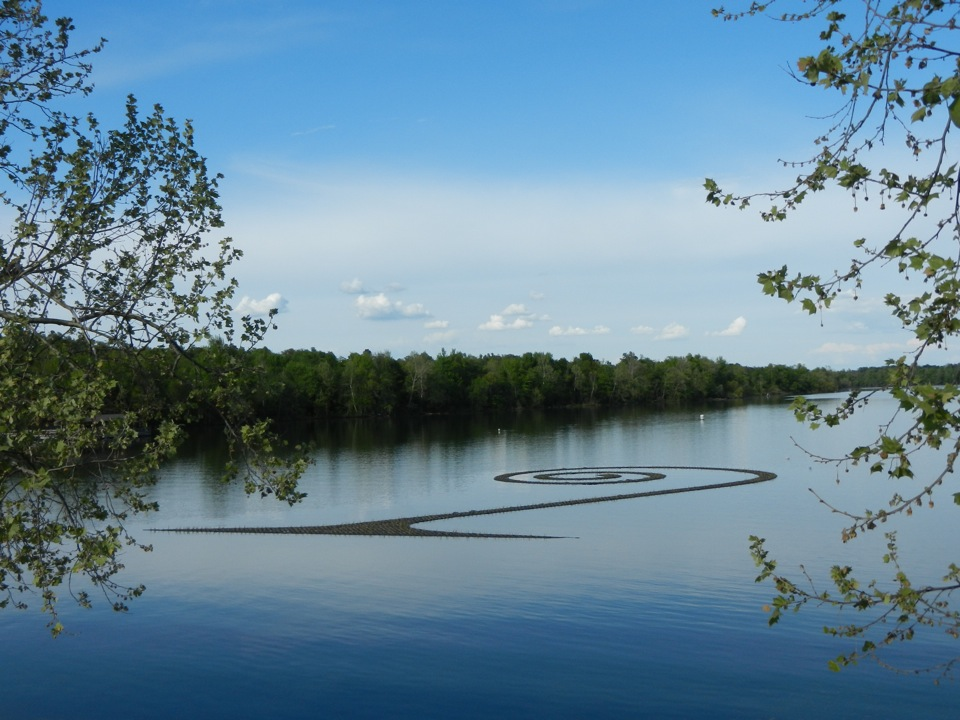
Spiral Wetland

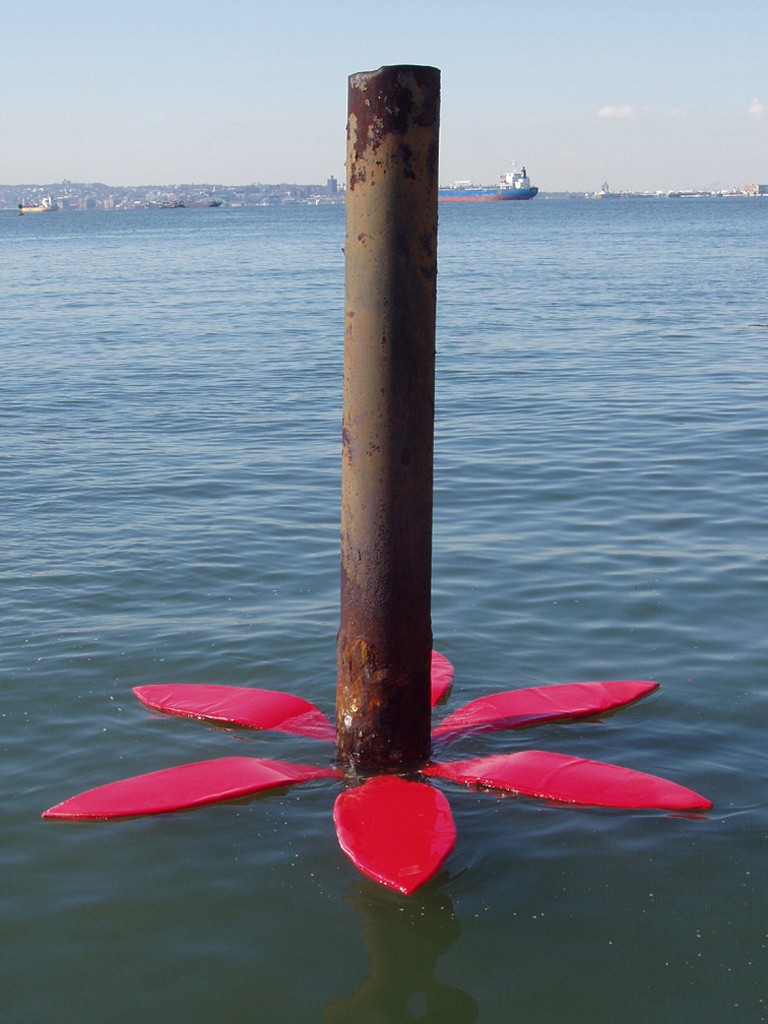
Tide Flowers at the Hudson River Park

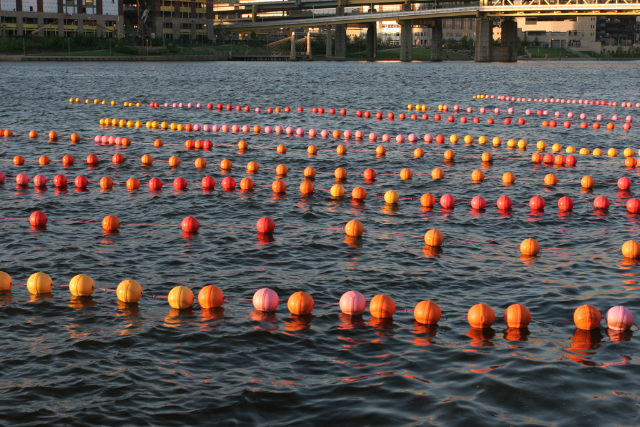
River Eyelash

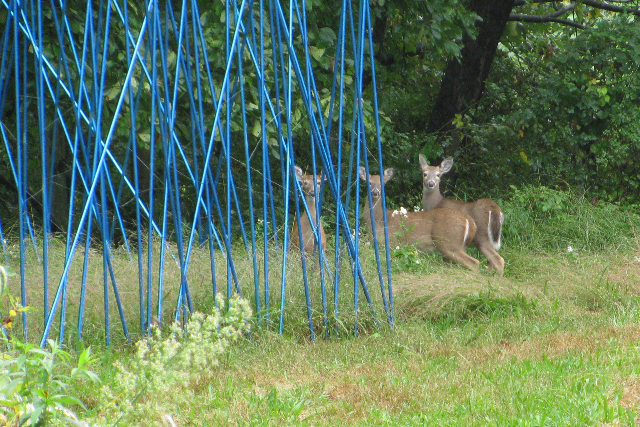
Kept Out

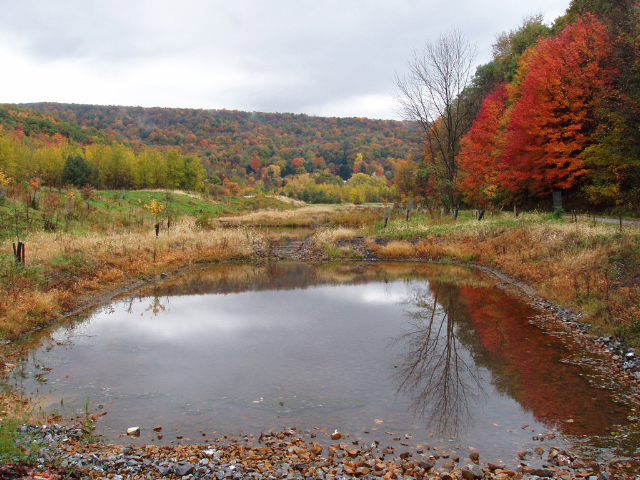
AMD-Art - Project in Vintondale

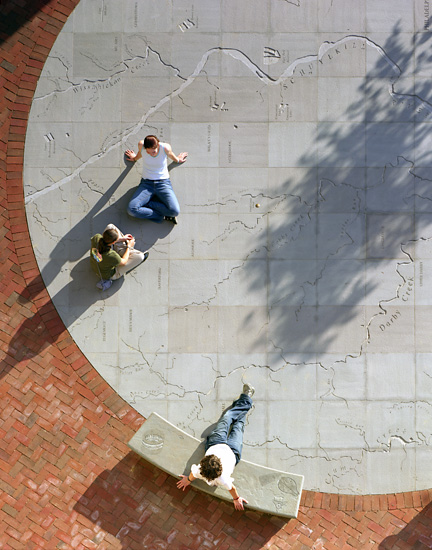
Watermap - Friends' Central School

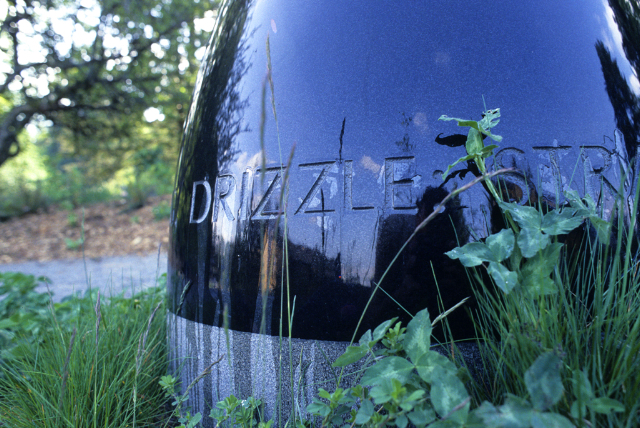
Cloud stones - Mineral Springs Park

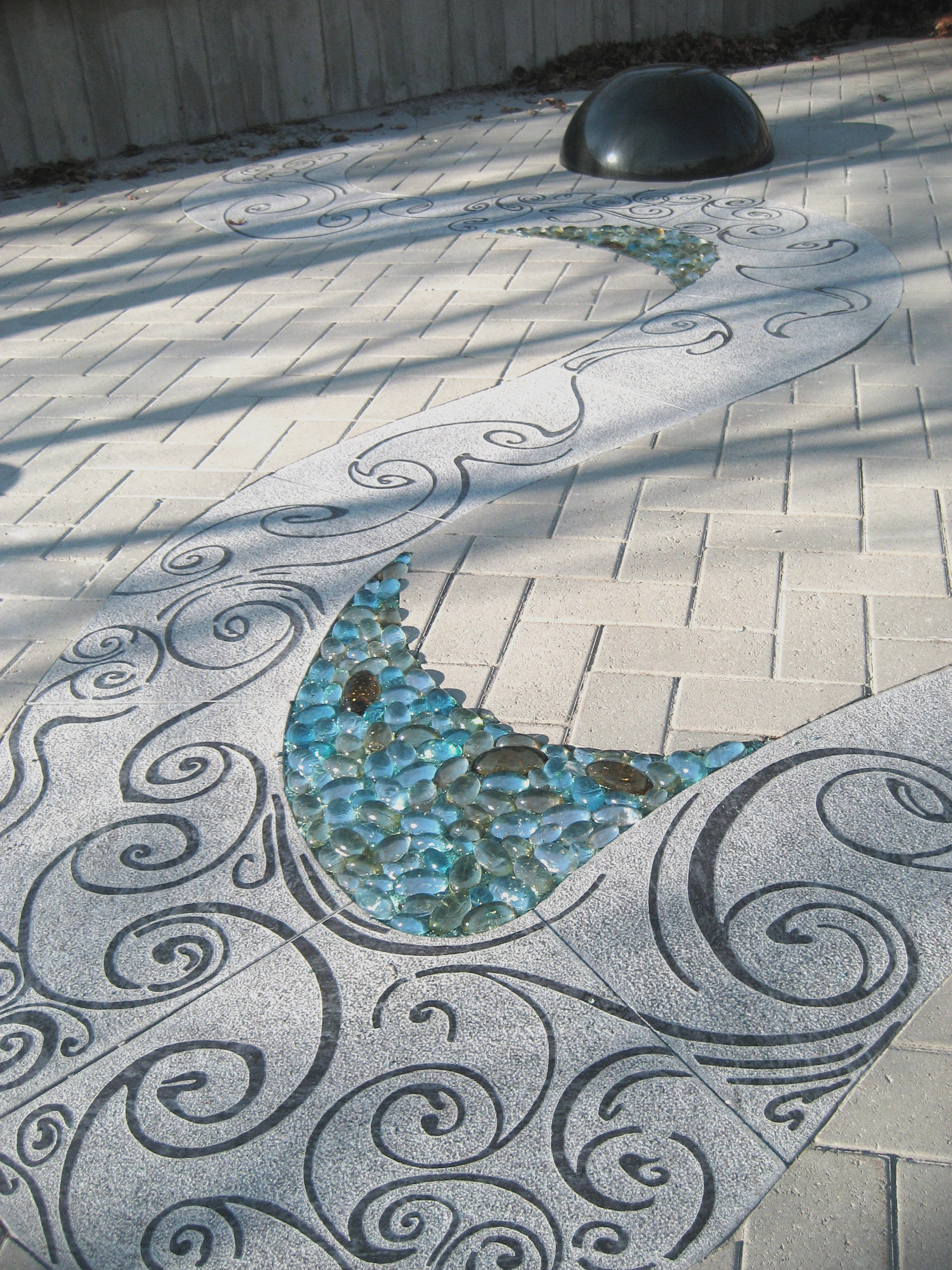
Lotic Meander

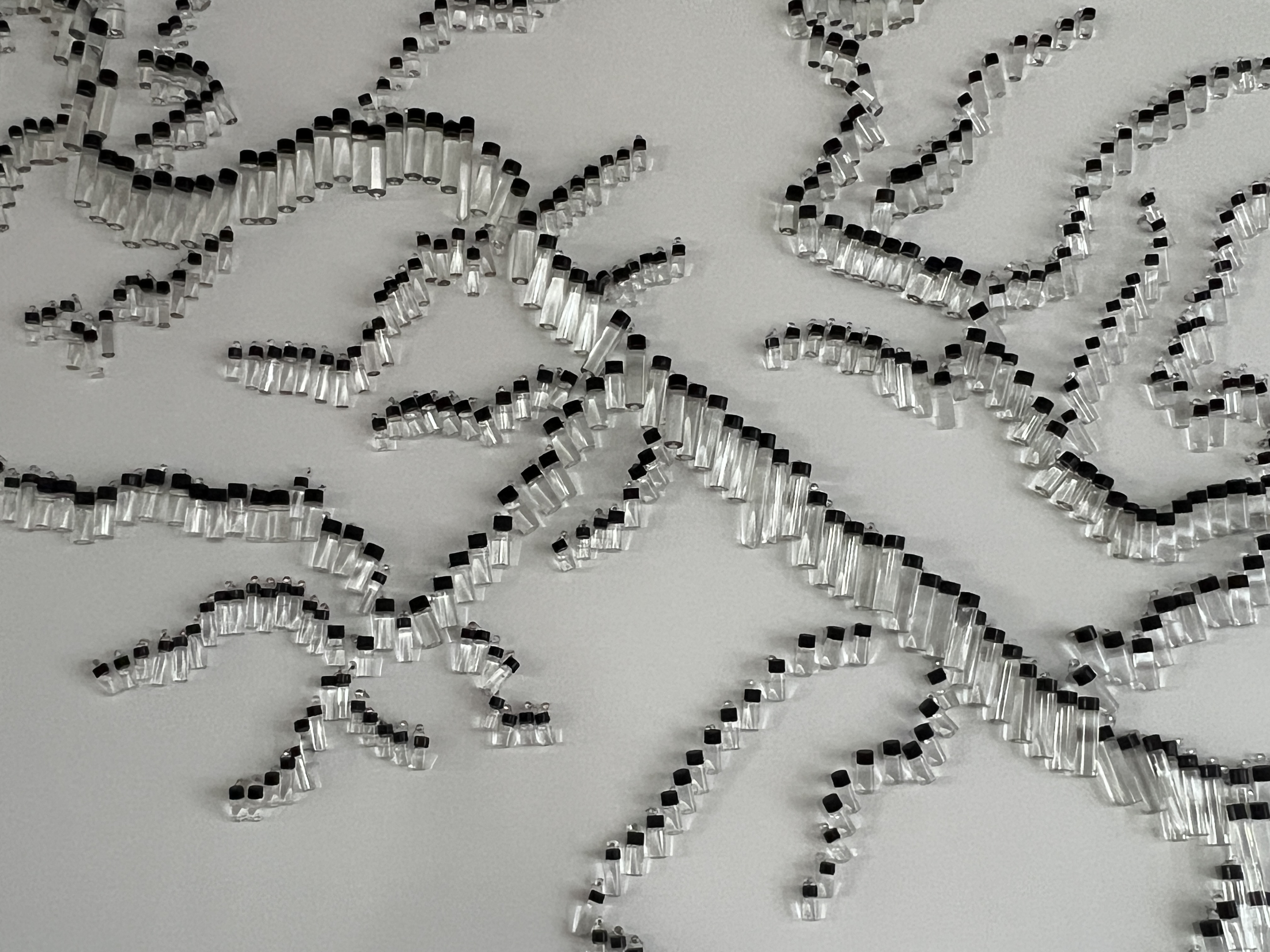
Schuylkill Collected

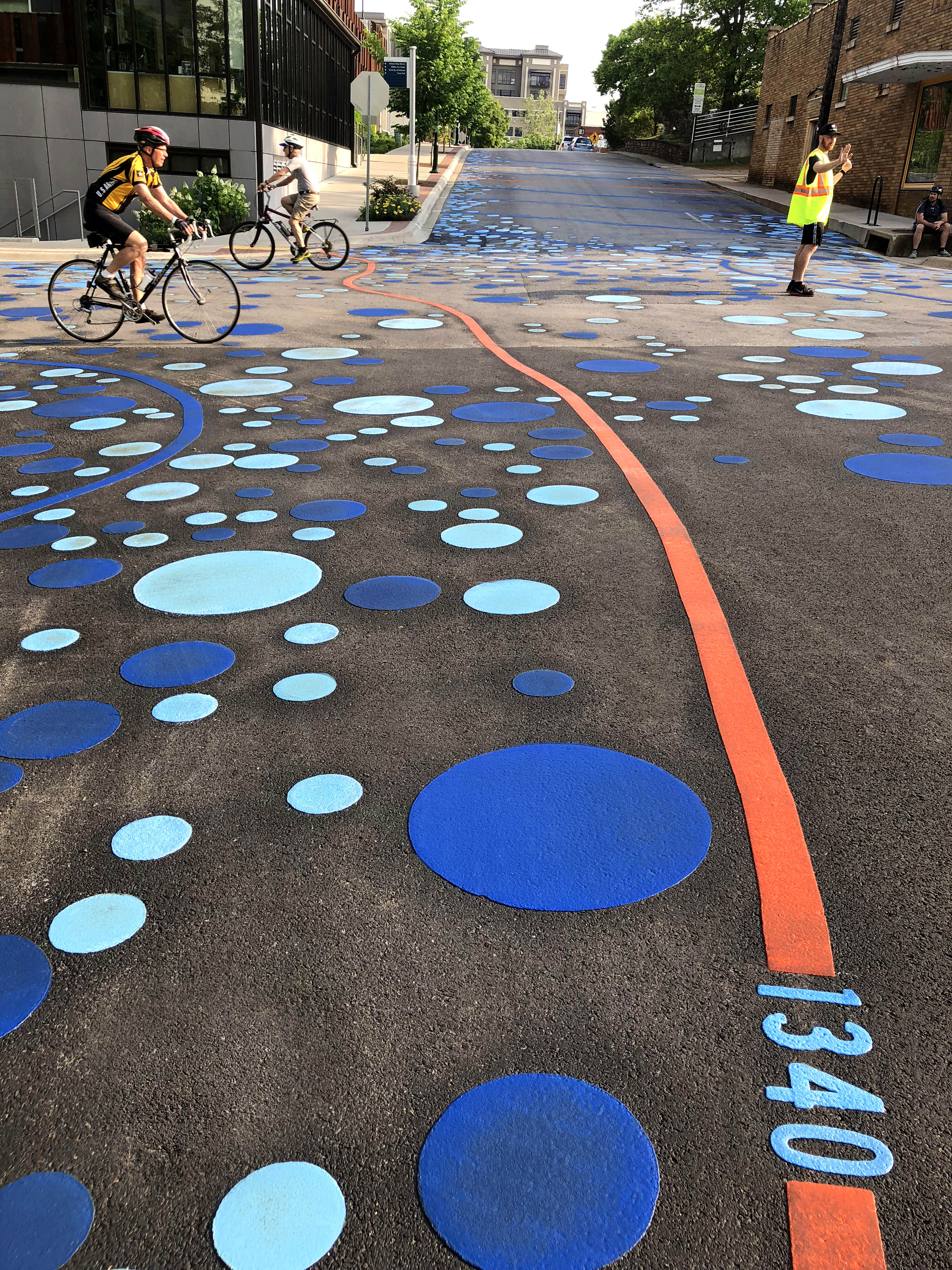
Topo Map

== Awards ==
- 1992 Pew Fellowships in the Arts
- 1999 Fabric Workshop and Museum, Philadelphia
- 2001 Mid-Atlantic Arts Foundation grant
- 2001, Excellence in Estuary Award, Partnership for the Delaware Estuary, Inc.
- 2010, 2010 Year in Review Award, Americans for the Arts Public Art Network, for "Ridge and Valley"
- 2015 Artist-in-Residence at the McColl Center for Art + Innovation.
- 2015, DC Water Green Infrastructure Challenge Award with Urban Rain Design and Nitsch Engineering
- 2018 Henry Meigs Environmental Leadership Award, Schuylkill Center for Environmental Education
- 2019, Woman of Environment Arts, Penn Futures
- 2024, Water Warriors Award from the Lewis Pugh Foundation
