= Anuradha Mathur =

Anuradha Mathur (1960 — 2022) was a practicing architect, landscape architect and a professor in the Landscape Architecture department at the University of Pennsylvania. She was based in Philadelphia and Bangalore but has worked all over the world. Her professional focus was water, particularly how its utilization can lead to its excess or scarcity and its opportunities for resilience-based design.

== Education ==
Mathur earned her Bachelor of Architecture from the School of Architecture in Ahmedabad, India in 1986. She went on to earn a Master of Landscape Architecture from the University of Pennsylvania in 1991.

== Career ==
Mathur frequently worked with Dilip da Cunha on water-centered landscape design and projects. They have completed work in Mumbai, Jerusalem, the Western Ghats of India, Sundarbans, Coastal Virginia, and at the US–Mexico border. Mathur and da Cunha have presented their work at GIDEST (Graduate Institute for Design, Ethnography, & Social Thought) Seminar at the New School, NY and at the IFLA (International Federation of Landscape Architects) Conference in Bangkok. They have also created forums for others to present work, including the 2011-2012 international symposium titled "In the Terrain of Water," held at PennDesign.

As a professor, Mathur has led studios in Mumbai, Jerusalem, and the Western Ghats of India. In 2013-2014, she and da Cunha lead a team from PennDesign to examine coastal resilience in the Norfolk and the Hampton Roads area of coastal Virginia. The project, funded by the Rockefeller Foundation, was called "Structures of Coastal Resilience."

In 2016, Mathur and da Cunha were Geddes Visiting Fellows at the School of Architecture and Landscape Architecture at the University of Edinburgh.

=== Major publications ===
With da Cunha, Mathur has written:

- Soak: Mumbai in an Estuary (NGMA and Rupa & Co, 2009)
- Deccan Traverses: the Making of Bangalore’s Terrain (Rupa & Co, 2006)
- Mississippi Floods: Designing a Shifting Landscape (Yale University Press, 2001)

Mathur and da Cunha also co-edited:

- Design in the Terrain of Water (A+RD Publishers, 2014)

=== Awards ===
Mathur and da Cunha have won the following awards as a partnership:

- Pew Fellowship Grant (2017)
- Architectural League of New York’s Young Architects Award
- Penn State University’s John R. Bracken Fellow Award
- Geddes Fellowship from the University of Edinburgh
