= Melanie Bilenker =

American craft artist (born 1978)

- Born: 1978 (age 47–48); New York City, US
- Education: University of the Arts, Philadelphia
- Website: melaniebilenker.com

Melanie Bilenker (born 1978) is an American craft artist from New York City who lives and works in Philadelphia, Pennsylvania. Her work is primarily in contemporary hair jewelry. In 2010 she received a Pew Fellowship in the Arts. Bilenker uses her own hair to "draw" images of contemporary life and self-portraits. The use of hair is an attempt at showing the person, and the moments left or shed behind.

== Collections ==
- Donna Schneier Collection
- Metropolitan Museum of Art
- Museum of Fine Arts, Boston
- Museum of Fine Arts, Houston
- Philadelphia Museum of Art
- Racine Art Museum
- Smithsonian American Art Museum
- Yale University Art Gallery

== Exhibitions ==
- 40 Under 40: Craft Futures (July 19, 2012 - February 3, 2013), Smithsonian American Art Museum, Renwick Gallery, Washington, D.C.
- Wear It or Not (March 12, 2013 - June 2, 2013), Museum of Art and Design, New York
- Jewelry, From Pearls to Platinum to Plastic (June 27, 2015 - January 1, 2017), Newark Museum, New Jersey
- Outrageous Ornament: Extreme Jewelry in the 21st Century (October 21, 2018 - January 27, 2019), Katonah Museum, New York

== Awards ==
- 2015 Peter S. Reed Foundation Individual Artist Grant
- 2010 Pew Fellowship in the Arts Individual Artist Fellowship
- 2007 Pennsylvania Council on the Arts Individual Artist Fellowship
- 2003 Sienna Gallery EA Award
