= Jay Kirk =

American writer (born 1970)

Jay Kirk is an American journalist, author, and lecturer at the University of Pennsylvania. He was born on July 19, 1970, and has written for publications such as GQ, New York Times Magazine, and Harper's. His book Kingdom Under Glass, published in 2010, recounts the life and story of taxidermist Carl Akeley. He is the recipient of a 2017 Whiting Foundation Creative Nonfiction Grant for his upcoming book Avoid the Day. Kirk is a National Magazine Award finalist for his story Burning Man, received the 2005 Pew Fellowship in the Arts and also is a MacDowell Fellow. He is the founder of Xfic, a journal of experimental nonfiction at the University of Pennsylvania.

== Biography ==
Jay Kirk was born in Nashville, TN on July 19, 1970. He got his a BA in English at Emerson College and proceeded to earn a BFA in creative writing at the same school. The Chicago Reader, for which he wrote a few cover stories, was the place where Kirk developed his interest in long-form journalism. His Harper's piece titled My Undertaker, My Pimp, was included in 2003's Best American Crime Writing Anthology. In 2005, Kirk became a faculty member at the University of Pennsylvania, where he teaches classes like Narrative Non-Fiction, Magazine Writing, and Experimental Non-Fiction.

== Books ==
Kingdom Under Glass was published by Henry Holt in 2010. The book tells the story of real-life taxidermist Carl Akeley, who created the famed dioramas at the American Museum of Natural History in New York City and The Field Museum in Chicago. The book was well received by critics. The Washington Post named it one of the best nonfiction titles of 2010. The San Francisco Chronicle calling it “an epic display of one man’s life” and NPR's All Things Considered deeming it “a thrill ride”.

His next book, Avoid the Day, an experimental memoir, is set to be published by Harper Perennial in 2020. The Whiting Foundation calls Avoid the Day “a thrilling, eccentric journey through time and space… a courageous experiment in hypersubjectivity” that “pushes the boundaries of what nonfiction can do”.

== Film ==
Director's Commentary: Terror of Frankenstein, was co-written by Jay Kirk and his cousin Tim Kirk, producer of the cult documentary Room 237. The movie provides fake director's commentary over Calvin Floyd's 1977 movie Terror of Frankenstein. Director's Commentary played at the Stanley and Fantasia Film Festivals in 2015, and opened to mixed reviews. Uproxx says it is “the ultimate film nerd joke”, and Bloody Disgusting deems it “a bizarre cinematic experiment”, while the Chicago Reader says the commentary is outshined by the actual movie

== Bibliography ==
Harper's Magazine

- “My undertaker, my pimp”, March 2002
- “Watching the detectives”, August 2003
- “Aslan Resurrected”, April 2004
- “Fool at War”, October 2005
- “The Shining Path”, June 2013
- “Bartók’s Monster”, October 2013

GQ

- "Hotels Rwanda", July 2008
- “Burning Man”, January 2012
- “The Swear Jar”, August 2013
- "Welcome to Pariahville", April 2015

New York Times Magazine

- "Gospel for Dummies", August 2000

Cimarron Review

- “Son of a Preacher”, Winter 2012

The Wilson Quarterly

- "The Electric Meme: A New Theory of How We Think and Communicate", Summer 2002

Chicago Reader

- “Simone’s Got Blue Eyes”, December 2001
