= Paula Marincola =

Paula Marincola was executive director of the Pew Center for Arts & Heritage in Philadelphia, Pennsylvania from 2008 to 2025 and is a contemporary art curator and critic. She was named one of the city's most influential and innovative people by Philadelphia Magazine (in 2014 and 2016, respectively). Marincola was awarded an honorary degree from Drexel University in 2018 as “a leader in the arts for more than three decades, playing a major role in shaping and fostering Greater Philadelphia’s vibrant arts and culture community.”

== Education and early career ==
Marincola was born in Philadelphia and is a Phi Beta Kappa graduate in art history of Syracuse University. From 1979 to 1985, she was a curator at the Institute of Contemporary Art, University of Pennsylvania, organizing Photography: Made in Philadelphia (1980–81), Street Sights (1981), Red Grooms’s Philadelphia Cornucopia and other Sculpto-pictoramas (1982), and Image Scavengers with Douglas Crimp (1982), among other exhibitions. She was a contributing critic to Artforum in the 1980s. From 1988 to 1997, Marincola was director of the Beaver College Art Gallery (now Arcadia University Art Gallery), where she organized solo exhibitions for Felix Gonzalez-Torres, Mary Heilmann, Tom Nozkowski, Glenn Ligon and Gary Simmons, Yukinori Yanagi, Richard Prince, Kenneth Price, Fred Wilson, and Jennifer Bolande, among other artists. Drexel University presented Marincola with the degree of Doctor of Humane Letters, honoris causa, in 2018. She addressed the graduates of Westphal College of Media Arts & Design at a June 2018 commencement event.

== At the Pew Center for Arts & Heritage ==
In 1997, Marincola was named founding director of the Philadelphia Exhibitions Initiative (PEI), a program of the Pew Charitable Trusts, administered by The University of the Arts, Philadelphia. Established in response to a Pew study of the regional art community's needs and priorities, PEI was designed to support innovative art exhibitions of “high artistic caliber and cultural significance” in the five-county Philadelphia region, as well as accompanying catalogues. Along with these large grants, PEI was also renowned for its annual curatorial roundtables, its travel grants for local curators to visit exhibitions around the world, and its small research library of international catalogues and DVDs.

In 2005, PEI joined the other cultural funding programs of the Pew Charitable Trusts under one roof, and in June 2008, Marincola was named the first executive director at the Pew Center for Arts & Heritage (the Center), which makes possible hundreds of performances, exhibitions, and events in Philadelphia's five-county region each year, in addition to symposia, workshops, and publications. As director, Marincola leads the organization in developing and implementing its strategic agenda as both grantmaker and hub for knowledge-sharing, guiding and aligning the Center's programs in the service of its mission “to foster a vibrant cultural community in Greater Philadelphia.”

In 2013, Marincola oversaw the consolidation and restructuring of the Center's funding initiatives. The Center currently makes project grants in two areas, Performance and Exhibitions & Public Interpretation; offers twelve annual Pew Fellowships to individual artists; and awards Advancement grants to institutions undertaking lasting improvements to their programming, audience engagement, and financial health.

Philadelphia Magazine named Marincola one of the city's most influential people in its April 2014 “Power Issue,” and in November 2016 the magazine featured her as one of the region's “Revolutionary Bosses”: leaders who have “made bold thinking the new way to do business in Philly.”

In 2018, Marincola was awarded an honorary degree from Drexel University, recognizing her "innovative and influential leadership in shaping arts and culture in the Philadelphia region."

== Publications ==
In 2019, Marincola edited Site Read, an anthology in which "seven exhibition makers lay out the motivations, conditions, logistics, and consequences of shows they organized that now stand as icons of structural innovation in terms of site," published by Mousse Publishing. The book includes contributions from Yves Aupetitallot, Mary Jane Jacob, Lu Jie, Raimundas Malašauskas, Alan W. Moore, Seth Siegelaub with Teresa Gleadowe, Jennifer (Licht) Winkworth and an introduction by Bruce Altshuler.

In 2015, Marincola coedited a web-based keywords anthology titled In Terms of Performance with Shannon Jackson, the Cyrus and Michelle Hadidi Chair in the Humanities and Associate Vice Chancellor for the Arts and Design at the University of California, Berkeley. Designed to generate shared literacies for understanding the goals, skills, and artistic traditions of experimental interdisciplinary work, In Terms of Performance features texts and interviews from artists, curators, presenters, and scholars (including Janine Antoni, Judith Butler, Lucinda Childs, Pablo Helguera, William Kentridge, and Yvonne Rainer) whose work reflects on relations among visual art, theatrical, choreographic, and performance art practices.

In 2013, Marincola coedited, with Peter Nesbett, the pocket-size anthology Pigeons on the Grass, Alas: Contemporary Curators Talk About the Field, titled after a Gertrude Stein poem. Illustrated by Sarah McEneaney, the book imagines curators (including Jens Hoffmann, Stuart Horodner, Hou Hanru, Helen Molesworth, Jessica Morgan, Ralph Rugoff, Ingrid Schaffner, Paul Schimmel, Claire Tancons, and Nato Thompson) as birds alighting to respond to a set of questions about their work and connects their responses into an extended conversation.

Previously, as director of the Philadelphia Exhibitions Initiative, Marincola developed a publication program geared toward identifying and analyzing exemplary curatorial practices and encouraging the professional and artistic development of the community. In October 2000, PEI convened a two-day symposium called “Curating Now: Imaginative Practice/Public Responsibility,” co-organized by Marincola and the American critic and curator Robert Storr, which aimed (in Marincola's words) “to assess the current state of curatorial practice, to articulate our professional values, and test the assumptions implicit in them.” Marincola edited the proceedings into a book with reflections by 147 curators, directors, educators, and critics (including Storr, Thelma Golden, Dave Hickey, Anne d’Harnoncourt, Hans-Ulrich Obrist, Paul Schimmel, and Nicholas Serota). Curating Now (PEI, 2002) remains an authoritative text for universities offering curatorial studies programs.

In 2006, Marincola conceived and edited the anthology What Makes a Great Exhibition? (PEI and Reaktion Books), a collection of fourteen essays by curators and historians on questions related to curatorial practice and contemporary exhibition-making. Contributors include Lynne Cooke, Carlos Basualdo, Ralph Rugoff, Iwona Blazwick, Ingrid Schaffner, Mark Nash, Mary Jane Jacob, and Jeffrey Kipnis. Now in its fourth printing, the book was also made available as an e-book in 2015.
