= Kingdom Under Glass =

Biography of Carl Akeley by Jay Kirk

- Author: Jay Kirk
- Genre: Biography
- Publisher: Henry Holt and Company
- Publication date: October 26, 2010
- ISBN: 9780805092820

Kingdom Under Glass: A Tale of Obsession, Adventure, and One Man’s Quest to Preserve the World’s Great Animals is the first book written by American author and journalist Jay Kirk. It was published by Henry Holt in 2010.

Kingdom Under Glass is the biography of Carl Akeley, the American taxidermist, explorer, and creator of the African Hall in the American Museum of Natural History in New York City.

Kirk first came up with the idea of writing Akeley’s biography when researching a piece he wrote about panthers for Harper’s Magazine, saying in an interview that the paradoxical nature of Akeley’s character and job (“he killed animals in order to save them”) was what most appealed to him in writing the biography.

The Washington Post reviewed Kingdom Under Glass, praising Kirk’s talent and the book’s “daring” narrative. Kirk was featured talking about Kingdom Under Glass on NPR’s All Things Considered podcast. SFGate calls Kingdom Under Glass “an epic display of one man’s life”, while Kirkus says the book narrates the “feral escapades of a creative wunderkind stitched together with novelistic zeal".

The documentary Stuffed, featured at 2019’s SXSW conference, features Kirk talking about Akeley and Kingdom Under Glass.
