= Pattie McCarthy =

American poet and educator

- Born: 1971 (age 54–55); Baltimore, MD
- Education: Temple University, Philadelphia, PA
- Alma mater: Towson University B.S.
- Known for: Poetry
- Awards: 2011 Pew Fellow in the Arts

Pattie McCarthy (born 1971) is an American poet and educator.

== Biography ==
McCarthy completed undergraduate work at Towson University and received her MA in creative writing from Temple University in Philadelphia in 1998.

McCarthy's poetry has been noted for its use of medieval subjects, references, and imagery, in addition to "re-visioning historical texts and re-voicing what has suffered omission from sanctioned history." More recent work has focused on tensions between public and private selves and day-to-day domesticities. When interviewed, McCarthy has listed Rachel Blau DuPlessis, Susan Howe, Lyn Hejinian, Cole Swensen, and Anne Waldman as influential to her own work and style.

External videos
- “Pew Fellows from Home: Patty McCarthey”, Pew Center for Arts & Heritage

McCarthy teaches literature and creative writing at Temple University. She has also taught at Loyola University, Queens College of the City University of New York, and Towson University.

McCarthy lives just outside of Philadelphia with her husband, poet Kevin Varrone, and three children.

== Awards and honors ==
McCarthy was a Pew Fellow in the Arts in 2011. In 2013, she was an artist resident at the Elizabeth Bishop House in Nova Scotia.

== Works ==
=== Books of poetry ===
- bk of (h)rs (Apogee Press, 2002) ISBN 9780966993776 OCLC 49612046
- Verso (Apogee Press, 2004) ISBN 9780974468747 OCLC 56663600
- Table Alphabetical of Hard Words (Apogee Press, 2010) ISBN 9780978766764 OCLC 759790659
- Marybones (Apogee Press, 2012) ISBN 9780985100735 OCLC 826737840
- Nulls (Horse Less Press, 2014) ISBN 9780982989678 OCLC 876350593
- Quiet Book (Apogee Press, 2016) ISBN 9780985100766 OCLC 953678346
- Wifthing (Apogee Press, 2021) ISBN 9781733137522 OCLC 1230218946

=== Chapbooks ===
- Octaves (ixnay press, 1998) OCLC 41899445
- Choragus (Potes & Poets Press, 1998) ISBN 9780937013847 OCLC 41162890
- alibi (that is : elsewhere) (Duration Press, 2003)
- L&O (Little Red Leaves Press, 2011)
- Domestic Cryptography Survey II (Dusie Kollektiv, 2013)
- scenes from the lives of my parents (Bloof Books, 2013) OCLC 881183162
- wifthing (WinteRed Press, 2014)
- Nova Scotia (Dusie Kollektiv, 2014)
- fifteen genre scenes (eth press, 2014)
- worrywort [with Jenn McCreary] (Little Red Leaves Press, 2014) OCLC 925832043
- x y z && (Ahsahta Press, 2015)
- margerykempething (eth press, 2017)
- qweyne wifthing (eth press, 2017)
