= Karen M'Closkey =

Landscape architect and associate professor

Karen M'Closkey is a landscape architect and Associate Professor in the Department of Landscape Architecture at the University of Pennsylvania. Her artistic and academic focus is the relationship between digital media and landscape architecture design, and M'Closkey is considered one of the leaders in this subfield. She is also the co-founder of PEG Office of Landscape + Architecture, a Philadelphia design and research firm.

== Education ==
M'Closkey earned a Bachelor of Architecture from the Southern California Institute of Architecture, graduating with distinction in 1994. She went on to earn a Master of Landscape Architecture, with distinction, from Harvard University in 1999.

== Career ==
M'Closkey has been active as a landscape architect for over 10 years. Her work focuses on the role of technology in landscape architecture. The relationship between digital media and landscape architecture is still in its early days, but M'Closkey is regarded as one of its most influential voices. She is an advocate of using digital modeling to design for complex systems of understand change over time with more accuracy. She explores these themes in both her academic and professional work. The firm PEG Office of Landscape + Architecture, which she co-founded with Keith VanDerSys, experiments with both digital modeling and new materials. The firm has worked with agencies such as the Philadelphia Water Department and the Pennsylvania Horticultural Society. The firm is particularly notable for its use of parametric modeling and scripting, which allows M'Closkey to recognize and responds to pattern in landscape in designs. Modeling also helps the team recognize patterns in climate change and urbanization which are not currently visible to landscape architects. The firm is described as being on the forefront of "digitally-driven" design practices, in contrast with firms that use technology purely to represent their designs.

M'Closkey teaches these concepts in the Landscape Architecture department at PennDesign. She teaches core design studios, option studios, and Contemporary Theories of Landscape Architecture. The advanced option studios explore how repetition, ornamentation, and surface modulation can create new landscape forms. M’Closkey co-organized a symposium at the University of Pennsylvania with VanDerSys. The symposium, called “Simulating Natures,” explored the role of environmental modeling and simulation tools in contemporary landscape architecture. The symposium was accompanied by an issue of LA+ Journal exploring the same themes and questions.

She is the guest editor (with Keith VanDerSys) of two issues of LA+ on the themes Simulation (2016) and GEO (forthcoming 2020). M’Closkey is co-curator and co-editor of the symposium and book Design with Nature Now (2019). M'Closkey was the recipient of the 2012–2013 Garden Club of America Rome Prize in landscape architecture.

=== Major publications ===
- "For Whom Do We Account in Climate Adaptation?" in A Blueprint for Coastal Adaptation: Uniting Design, Economics, and Policy (Island Press, 2021)
- LA+ GEO, guest edited with Keith VanDerSys (ORO Editions, 2020)
- Design with Nature Now, co-edited with Frederick Steiner, Richard Weller, and Billy Fleming (Lincoln Institute of Land Policy, 2019)
- Dynamic Patterns: Visualizing Landscapes in a Digital Age (Routledge, 2017). Co-Authored with Keith VanDerSys
- LA+ Simulation, guest edited with Keith VanDerSys (ORO Editions, 2016)
- "Criticality in Landscape Architecture: Origins in 19th-century American Practices" in Modernism and Landscape Architecture, 1890–1940 (National Gallery Center for Advanced Studies in the Visual Arts, 2015)
- "Structuring Relations: From Montage to Model in Composite Imaging," in Composite Landscapes: Photomontage and Landscape Architecture (Hatje Cantz, 2015)
- Unearthed: the Landscapes of Hargreaves Associates (University of Pennsylvania Press, 2013) – received the J.B. Jackson Book Award from the Foundation for Landscape Studies
- "Synthetic Patterns: Fabricating Landscapes in the Age of ‘Green,'" Journal of Landscape Architecture (Spring 2013)
- "Not Garden" in VIA: Dirt (Cambridge: MIT Press, 2011)

=== Awards ===
==== Individual ====
- 2017 Paul L. Cejas Visiting Scholar, Florida International University
- 2015 G. Holmes Perkins Award for Distinguished Teaching
- 2014 The John Brinckerhoff Jackson Book Prize (Foundation for Landscape Studies) for Unearthed: the Landscapes of Hargreaves Associates (University of Pennsylvania Press, 2013)
- 2012–2013 Garden Club of America Rome Prize in Landscape Architecture

==== PEG Office of Landscape + Architecture ====
- 2021 WLA Award: Concept-Analysis and Planning, Honorable Mention (Fantasy Island: The Galapagos Archipelago)
- 2020 ASLA Honor Award: Analysis and Planning (Fantasy Island: The Galapagos Archipelago, PEG Office of Landscape + Architecture)
- 2019 ASLA Award of Excellence: Communications Award (Resilient by Design: Bay Area Challenge, Bionic Team)
- 2013 Pew Fellowship in the Arts
- 2011 Architectural League Prize for Young Architects and Designers
- Honorable Mention: Buzzard's Bay Bridge Park International Design Competition (2010)
- Emerging New York Architects Prize (2010)
- Boston Society of Architects Research Grant
