= Lauren Mabry =

American artist (born 1985)

- Born: 1985; Cincinnati, Ohio
- Known for: Art, Ceramics, Sculpture
- Website: laurenmabry.com

Lauren Mabry (b. 1985, Cincinnati, Ohio) is an American ceramic artist recognized for her innovative approach to glazed ceramic forms. Born in Cincinnati, Ohio and raised in Madison, Wisconsin, she received her BFA from the Kansas City Art Institute and her MFA from the University of Nebraska–Lincoln.

She is the recipient of a grant from the Pew Center for Arts & Heritage. She was awarded the National Council on Education for the Ceramic Arts (NCECA) Emerging Artist award in 2014.

Her work is in the collection of the Daum Museum of Contemporary Art and the Nelson-Atkins Museum of Art. Her exhibits include the solo exhibit, "Cylinders" at the Nerman Museum of Contemporary Art in 2012, the group exhibit, "Form Over Function," at the Pentimenti Gallery in 2019, and the group exhibit, "Reminiscing the Now: Directions in Contemporary Clay" at the Gallery at University of Texas, Austin in 2022.

Her work, Glazescape (Green Shade), was acquired by the Smithsonian American Art Museum as part of the Renwick Gallery's 50th Anniversary Campaign,This Present Moment: Crafting a Better World.

Mabry writes, "By merging the gestural mark-making of Abstract Expressionism with Postminimalism's focus on material agency, my work reclaims visibility for women artists historically excluded from these movements and marginalized for working in ceramics—a medium long dismissed as craft. I engage with a gendered approach to abstraction by embracing material fluidity, process-driven unpredictability, and the collapse of boundaries between painting, sculpture, and printmaking—challenging the separation of craft and fine art. Like Lynda Benglis's poured forms, my vibrant ceramic surfaces assert a sensual, bodily presence that celebrates transformation as a feminist gesture."

She has worked to uplift voices of other women artists in her article, The Context of Technique
