= Laynie Browne =

American poet

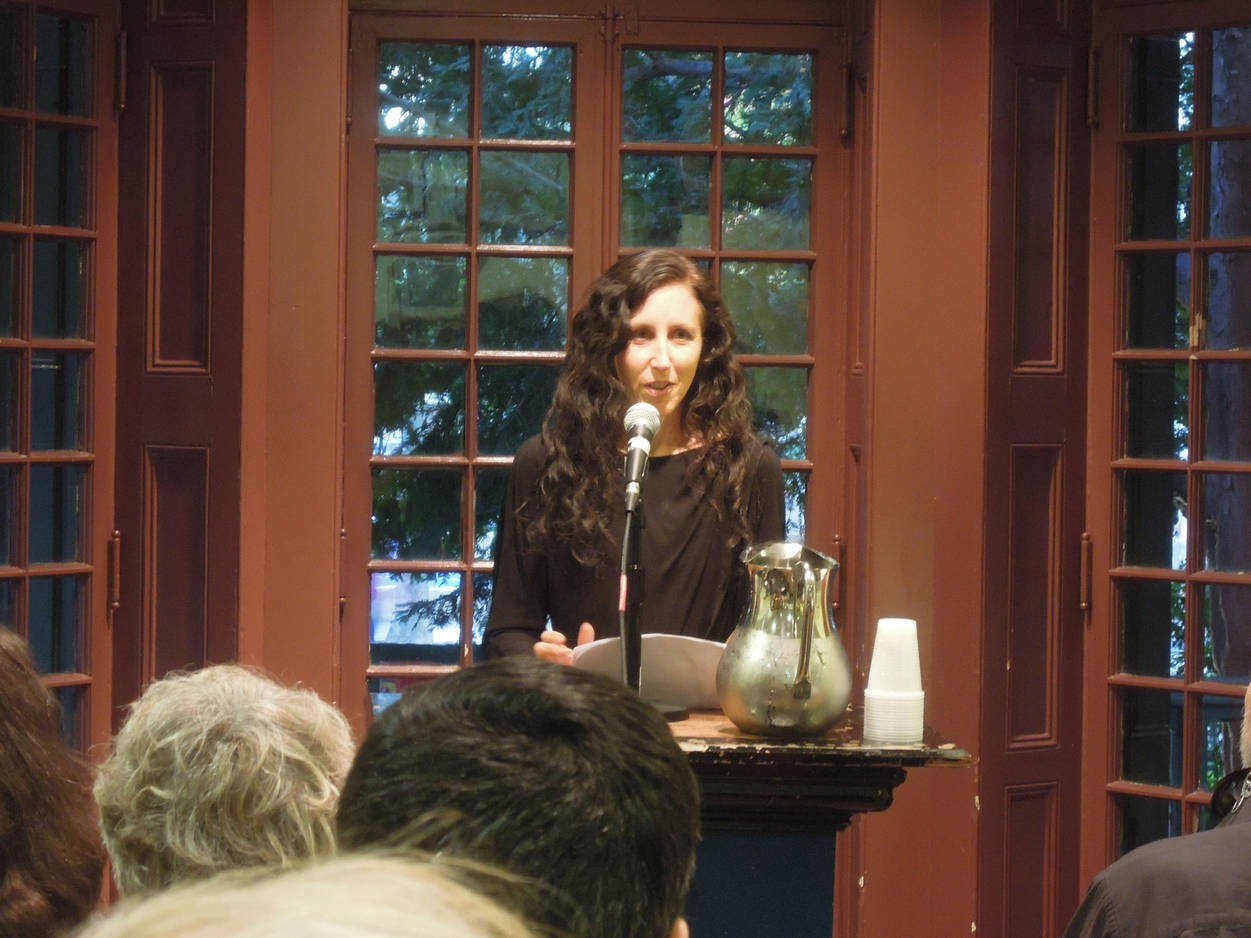
- Laynie Browne reading at Kelly Writers House, University of Pennsylvania
- Born: 21 June 1966 (age 60); Los Angeles, California, US
- Education: Brown University (MFA)
- Occupation: Poet
- Writing career
- Language: English
- Genre: Poetry

Laynie Browne (born 1966, Los Angeles) is an American poet. Her work explores notions of silence and the invisible, through the re-contextualization of poetic forms, such as sonnets (Daily Sonnets), tales (The Scented Fox), letters (The Desires of Letters), psalms (Lost Parkour Ps(alms)) and others.

== Life ==
Laynie Browne received her M.F.A. from Brown University in 1990. She was a member of the Subtext collective, Seattle, and The Ear Inn in New York City.

Browne has worked as an arts educator in public K–12 schools, with a focus on poetry. She has taught at University of Washington, Mills College, and at the Poetry Center at the University of Arizona. Currently, she is a professor of creative writing at the University of Pennsylvania. Browne also serves as a mentor in the Afghan Women's Writing Project.

Her work has appeared in The Norton Anthology of Postmodern American Poetry, Conjunctions, Fence, Monkey Puzzle, Ecopoetry: A Contemporary American Anthology, Poet's Choice. She is co-editor of I'll Drown My Book: Conceptual Writing by Women (Les Figues Press, 2012) and is currently editing an anthology of original essays on the Poet's Novel. Browne's other current project, You Envelop Me, utilizes the elegy to investigate birth and loss within the context of the mourning process. "Attempts to illuminate once-hidden meanings are points of perforation, punctures in the fabric of writing," says Browne. "I consider form as a container, lens, garment, dwelling, and means of locomotion."

She lives in Wallingford, Pennsylvania. As of 2023, she teaches at the University of Pennsylvania.

== Awards ==
- National Poetry Series (2006)
- Pew Fellowship in the Arts, Pew Center for Arts & Heritage (2014)
- Gertrude Stein Award in Innovative American Poetry (Three-time recipient)

== Work ==
- Practice. Split Level Texts. 2015. ISBN 978-0-985811-16-7.
- Lost Parkour Ps(alms). Presses Universitaires de Rouen. 2014. ISBN 979-10-240-0222-4. (Available in English and French)
- The Desires of Letters. Counterpath Press. 2010. ISBN 978-1-933996-19-6.
- Daily Sonnets. Counterpath Press. 2007. ISBN 978-1-933996-00-4.
- The Scented Fox. Wave Books. 2007. ISBN 978-1-933517-26-1.
- Drawing of a Swan Before Memory. University of Georgia Press. 2005. ISBN 978-0-8203-2729-7.
- Mermaid's Purse. Spuyten Duyvil. 2005. ISBN 978-1-933132-08-2.
- Original Presence, Shivistan Books (2006)
- Pollen Memory. Tender Buttons. 2003. ISBN 978-0-927920-13-1.
- Acts of Levitation. Spuyten Duyvil. 2002. ISBN 978-1-881471-94-3.
- Gravity's Mirror. Primitive Publications. 2000.
- The Agency of Wind. Avec Books. 1999. ISBN 978-1-880713-12-9.
- Rebecca Letters. Kelsey St. Press. 1997. ISBN 978-0-932716-43-9.

=== chapbooks ===
- Original presence. Shivastan Publications. 2006.
- The Desires of Letters. gong editions. 2005.
- Webs of Agriope. Phylum Press. 2005.
- Lee Ann Brown; Laynie Browne (2004). Nascent toolbox. Owl Press.
- Clepsydra. Instress.
- Lore. Instress. 1998.
- One constellation. Leave Books. 1994.

=== Novels ===
- Acts of Levitation, a novel (2002, Spuyten Duyvil)
