= Jennifer Levonian =

American artist

- Born: 1977 (age 48–49); West Virginia
- Education: College of William and Mary, Rhode Island School of Design
- Website: http://www.jenniferlevonian.com/

Jennifer Levonian (born 1977) is a Philadelphia-based artist who creates cut-paper and watercolor animations.

In 2009, Levonian received a Pew Fellowship in the Arts award. She was the second prize winner of the third Outwin Boochever Portrait Competition in 2012.

Levonian's work has been screened and exhibited nationally. She has collaborated with organizations like WHYY and Library Company of Philadelphia.

== Exhibitions ==
- Shake out your cloth, Fleisher-Ollman Gallery, 2016

== Awards ==
- 2012 Outwin Boochever Portrait Competition, 2nd prize
- 2009 Pew Fellowship in the Arts Award
