= Ralph Lemon =

American dancer

- Born: August 1, 1952 (age 74); Cincinnati, Ohio
- Education: University of Minnesota
- Awards: 2000 Creative Capital Performing Arts Award; 2012 Foundation for Contemporary Arts Grants to Artists Award; 2015 National Medal of Arts; 2018 Heinz Award in the Arts and Humanities

Ralph Lemon (born August 1, 1952, in Cincinnati, Ohio) is an American choreographer, company director, writer, visual artist and a conceptualist. Raised in a religious environment, he developed his artistic creativity as a child. Early in his career, Lemon used painting as a source of expression, and as he discovered dance, utilized movement as a physical means of expression.

== Career and awards ==
Lemon began his educational career in literature and theater arts at the University of Minnesota. Upon graduation in 1975, Lemon trained with Nancy Hauser, who eventually asked Lemon to join her company. Before Lemon participated, he cofounded Mixed Blood Theater Company in 1976, in Minneapolis. He eventually moved to New York where he met and danced with Meredith Monk and her company. Soon after leaving Monk's company in 1985, he founded the Ralph Lemon Dance company. Over the length of his career he has worked with renowned companies such as the Limón Dance Company, Alvin Ailey's Repertory Ensemble, the Geneva Opera Ballet, Jacob's Pillow Dance Ensemble, and Lyons Opera Ballet. Lemon also performed in a video documentary with choreographer Bebe Miller.

Lemon is known for his collaborations in different media and with musicians. Ralph Lemon's work has been acknowledged with awards such as the National Endowment for the Arts choreographic fellowship; American Choreographers Award, 1987; Gold Medal, New York Dance and Performance ("Bessie") Award, 1987. With a decade of success behind the Ralph Lemon Company, Lemon made a crucial decision to disband the company for varying reasons from financial to the pursuit of broadening his artistic interest.

Lemon received a 2000 Creative Capital Performing Arts Award and 2012 Foundation for Contemporary Arts Grants to Artists Award.

Ralph Lemon was one of the twelve recipients of the 2015 National Medal of Arts. In 2018, he received the 23rd Annual Heinz Award in the Arts and Humanities. In 2019, he received the Francis J. Greenburger Award for artists whom the art world knows to be of extraordinary merit but who have not been fully recognized by the public.

Lemon has lived and worked in New York City's East Village since 1991.

== Geography Trilogy ==
Over a ten-year span, Lemon created a trilogy that uses choreography to present social and political issues in numerous collaborative projects. Lemon recently finished the ten year art project, Geography Trilogy, which investigated an apparent collision of cultures and searched for personal and artistic identity within a broader spectrum. During Ralph Lemon's ten year trilogy creation, he wrote two books entitled Geography: Art, Race, Exile to correlate to the dance Geography and Tree: Belief, Culture, Balance which relates to the dance Tree. The third part of the trilogy, Come Home Charley Patton, is now a book. He ended up creating these two books as a result of physicality, emotional conflicts, spiritual connections and specifically cultural contradictions that lead to the numerous collaborations and experiences he gained.

The overall synopsis of the Geography Trilogy is to create a link and understanding to other cultures histories while evolving and experimenting with his artistic works in three different continents. For example, Geography formulated in Africa, Tree originated in Asia, and Come Home Charley Patton brought Lemon back to the United States. Ralph Lemon's creative journey began with Geography in Côte d'Ivoire, Guinea. The journals he wrote gave insight into the life of an "American, African, brown, black, blue black, male, and artist." Embodying these characteristics, Lemon sought not only to create art about his culture but to connect with his heritage during the duration of his visit. Lemon then ventured to Asia for his next piece in the trilogy Tree. Tree is ritually structured through Buddhism, and reveals a conflict of cultural values pertaining to performance, race, identity, modernity and tradition. Lemon finished the trilogy in the US with Come Home Charley Patton, a piece that revisits a segregated time in history. The performance of Come Home Charley Patton shows how "different generations remember the same critical events and places; what kind of narratives do justice to traumatic memories; and what form memories can ultimately take through the aesthetic works of this project."

== Artistic style ==
Much of Lemon's success is attributed to his unique ability to express dramatic and emotional content through movement using new art forms. Ralph Lemon is currently the artistic director of Cross Performance Inc. in New York. Lemon strives to invent and be innovative with each performance he creates by conveying different concepts and using different media. The core of Ralph Lemon's style in his earlier works was atmospherically showcased with strong costumes and props to visually help the audience understand the narrative. By the early 1990s he strayed away from a theatrical style to a more movement oriented style by focusing on the body. Ralph Lemon uses both his art and anthropology backgrounds to influence his choreography, but he refrains from distorting the cultural importance of dance within traditions.

== Performances ==
=== Works ===
1984-

- Ant's Burden (mus. Bob Roman), solo
- Romance (mus. Tom Waites)
- Folktales and Romance 4, evening-length performance produced by Dance Theatre Workshop, New York
- Boundary Water (mus. Beethoven), New Dance Ensemble of Minnesota
- Folktales with Men and Oranges, for Dance on the Lower East Side Festival, New York
- The Last Nights of Paris and Georgette, Dance Theatre Workshop

1985-

- Plan de Liebe, CoDanceCo
- Forest, (mus. Linda Bouchard), duet, American Dance Festival
- And the Jungle Will Obliterate the Shrine/Seasons, RLC
- Scarecrow, (mus. Hart)

1986-

- Flock, (mus. Sibelius), Jacob's Pillow Dance Ensemble
- En Su Llama Mortal, Ballet Hispancio of New York
- Two w/Bebe Miller (mus. Hyams Hart)

1987-

- Nightingales and Fisherman (mus. Bach)
- Les Noces (mus. Ravel, Debussy), RLC
- Waiting for Carnival, New Dance Ensemble

1988-

- Happy Trails (mus. country and western collage), RLC
- Cherubino and the Nightingale (mus. Mozart), RLC
- Folkdance Duet (mus. traditional Norwegian folk), RLC
- Folkdance, Alvin Ailey Repertory Ensemble
- Punchinello, Boston Ballet

1989-

- Joy (mus. Cale), RLC
- Sleep (mus. Fauré), RLC

1990-

- Joy (Solo), (mus. Satie), RLC
- Bogus Pomp, Lyons Opera Ballet
- Civilian, solo

1991-

- Persephone (mus. Davis), RLC
- Folkdance Sextet (mus. Beethoven), RLC
- Folkdance Solo (mus. taped conversation), RLC
- Don Juan, Graz Opera Ballet

1992-

- Their Eyes Rolled Back in Ecstasy (mus. Hyams Hart, Barret, chants), RLC
- Their Eyes Rolled Back in Ecstasy (Solo) (mus. Hyams Hart), RLC
- Phrases Almost Biblical, RLC
- My Tears Have Been My Meat Night and Day, Lyons Opera Ballet
- Folkdance (with Songs), Batsheva Dance Company

1993-

- Folkdance Sextet, The Metropolitan Ballet of Michigan

1996-

- Konbit, a video documentary collage
- Persephone, collaboration between Philip Trager, Rita Dove, Eavan Boland, and Andrew Szegedy-Maszak

1997-

- Geography, Part 1 in Geography Trilogy

1999-

- Three, a film created by Bebe Miller, and Isaac Julien

2000-

- Tree, Part 2 in Geography Trilogy
- Temples, a mixed media installation of works related to Tree

2001-

- Mirrors and Smoke, new media collaboration with Philip Mallory
- The Geography Trilogy, visual art installation

2004-

- Come Home Charley Patton, Part 3 in Geography Trilogy

2007-

- The Geography Trilogy DVD Archive Collection
- (The efflorescence of) Walter, Mixed media installation at The Kitchen, NYC May–June
- (The efflorescence of) Walter as part of Open-Ended (the art of engagement) exhibition at the Walker Art Center, Minneapolis, Minnesota March–June

2009-

- Rescuing the Princess, Lyons Opera Ballet

2010-

- How Can you Stay in the House all Day and Not Go Anywhere

== Publications ==
- Persephone With Eavan Boland, Rita Dove, and Phillip Trager, Middletown, Connecticut, 1996.
- Geography: Art, Race, Exile. By Ralph Lemon. Hanover, NH: Wesleyan University Press, 2000
- Tree: Belief, Culture, Balance. By Ralph Lemon.
