= Pennsylvania Council on the Arts =

American arts agency in the state of Pennsylvania

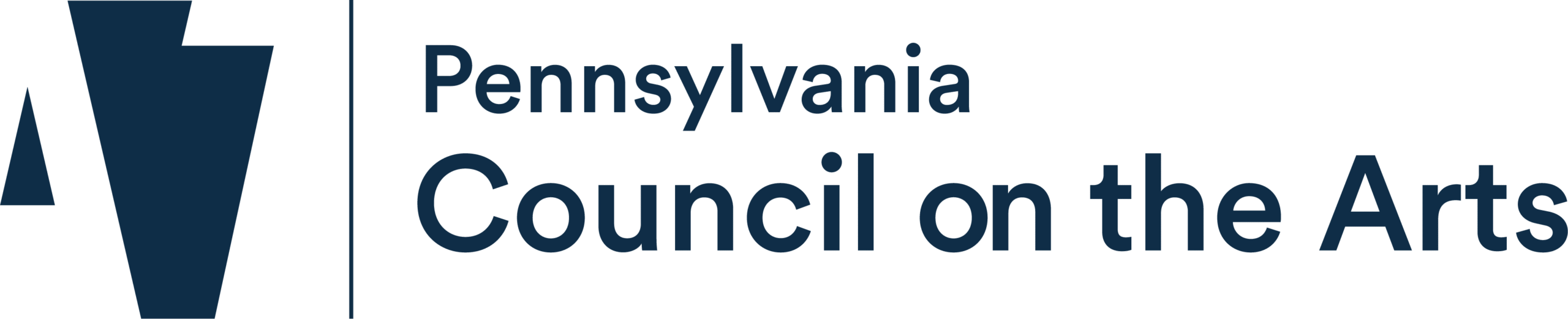

Agency overview
- Jurisdiction: State government of Pennsylvania
- Headquarters: Harrisburg, Pennsylvania

The Pennsylvania Council on the Arts (PCA) is an agency serving the U.S. state of Pennsylvania. Its mission is to strengthen the cultural, educational, and economic vitality of Pennsylvania's communities through the arts. This mission is paired with a cross-cutting strategy of diversity, equity, and inclusion, promoting equitable access for all Pennsylvanians to participate fully in a creative life and in the diverse forms of arts and culture in the commonwealth.

== History ==
Established by the General Assembly in 1966, the PCA was charged with ascertaining how Pennsylvania's artistic and cultural resources, "including those already in existence and those which should be brought into existence," are to serve the cultural needs and aspirations of the citizens of the state. Directly and through regional partnerships, the PCA addresses its mission through a combination of awarding state grant funds, supporting teaching artist residencies in schools and community settings, and offering valuable information services on a range of topics including marketing, capacity building, and community development through arts strategies.

As a state agency, it is located in the Office of the Governor. Its headquarters are in Harrisburg, Pennsylvania.

== Council members ==
Citizen members:

- Jeffrey A. Parks, Chair, Bethlehem
- Jeffrey W. Gabel, Vice-Chair, Gettysburg
- Emmai Alaquiva, Pittsburgh
- Dennis L. Astorino, AIA, Pittsburgh
- Natalee Colón, York
- Susan H. Goldberg, Philadelphia
- William Lehr, Jr., Palmyra
- Hon. William F. Morgan, Warren
- Norman E. Stull, Spinnerstown
- Catzie Vilayphonh, Philadelphia
- Tim Warfield, Jr., York
- James A. West, Jr., Pittsburgh
- Jen H. Zaborney, Harrisburg

Legislative Members:

- Senator
- Senator
- Representative Shelby Labs, Plumsteadville
- Representative Joe Ciresi, Limerick Township

== See also ==
- List of Pennsylvania state agencies
