= Franklin Street Works =

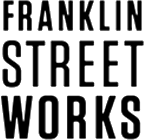

Franklin Street Works was a contemporary art exhibition space and café located in Stamford, Connecticut. They sponsored three to four themed exhibitions a year. Connecticut Magazine described the space as containing "thought provoking... politically motivated" art.

== History ==
It is Stamford's first nonprofit modern art gallery and is located in a renovated brick townhouses originally built in the 1880s. It exhibits works by emerging artists and strives to be a cultural laboratory where artists and community members can collaborate and interact. Works also include performances of experimental music and performance art projects. In 2012 it received a grant from the Andy Warhol Foundation for the Visual Arts According to the Stamford Daily Voice: "Franklin Street Works provides the region with critically acclaimed contemporary art exhibitions and programming, garnering positive reviews in international publications such as ArtForum online, Art Papers and Hyperallergic." It organizes approximately three original contemporary art exhibitions each year.

Franklin Street Works was founded in 2011 by attorney Kathryn Emmett. It closed in 2020 due to financial pressures related to the COVID-19 pandemic of 2020.

== Notable exhibits ==
I hear it everywhere I go, September 2017 – January 2018. A collection of works focused on the disillusionment with the American Dream. The show was inspired by artist Cady Noland's 1987 essay "Towards a Metalanguage of E V I L" and built around socially acceptable forms of violence used to express that discontent. The show was curated by Franklin Street Works creative director, Terri C. Smith. Exhibiting artists include Alex Bag, Michael Blake, Nayland Blake, Jen DeNike, Jonah Freeman & Justin Lowe, Rashid Johnson, Adam McEwen, Rodney McMillian, Tameka Norris, Cheryl Pope, Mikel Rouse, and Melissa Vandenberg.

Cut-Up: Contemporary Collage and Cut-Up Histories through a Feminist Lens, January – April 2016. Multigenerational women artists spanning 50 years, who pushed the boundary of cut-up techniques across media, including sculpture, video, sound art, painting, performance, printed matter, poetry, and photography. This exhibition was guest curated by Katie Vida and featured art by Ruth Anderson, Phyllis Baldino, Dodie Bellamy, Ofri Cnaani, Lourdes Correa-Carlo, Mayme Donsker, Heike-Karin Foell, Susan Howe, Jennie C. Jones, Alexis Knowlton, Carrie Moyer, Lorraine O'Grady, People Like Us, Sheila Pepe, Faith Ringgold, Mariah Robertson, Carolee Schneemann, Nancy Shaver, Meredyth Sparks, Cauleen Smith, Martine Syms, and Janice Tanaka.

Acting on Dreams, June – August 2015. The show focused on immigration issues through a variety of political and visual tactics. Featuring art by Andrea Bowers, CultureStrike & JustSeeds, Chitra Ganesh and Mariam Ghani, Ghana Think Tank, Marisa Morán Jahn (Studio REV-) in collaboration with National Domestic Workers Alliance and Caring Across Generations, Jenny Polak, QUEEROCRACY in collaboration with Carlos Motta, and Favianna Rodriguez.

The Sunken Living Room, April – May 2014. Participating artists investigated the financial crisis, from issues around labor, debt and unemployment to corrupt banking practices and post-industrial urban landscapes, through sculpture, video, texts, drawings, prints and photos. Among other pieces was a sculpture by Constantina Zavitsanos that was a recording of her student debt printed out in hourly increments on paper over a three-year time span. As Zavitsanos put it "When you have a lot of material, you make something out of it. And I had a lot of debt."

Kool-Aid Wino, July – September 2013. The show focused on how some of the most successful pieces of art are riddled with mistakes that became triumphs. Guest curated by Claire Barliant and featured artists, Anne Carson, Choi Dachal, Frank Heath, Owen Land, Rotem Linial, James Merrill, Alice Miceli, Jenny Perlin, Aki Sasamoto.
