= Denike =

Surname list

Denike is a surname. Notable people with the surname include:

- Jen DeNike, American contemporary artist
- John Robert Denike (1903–1985), Canadian politician in Saskatchewan

== See also ==
- Denike (Sri Lanka)
- Deniker
- Denise (given name)
