= San Francisco Fringe Festival =

One of the oldest fringe theatre festivals in U.S.

- Location: Tenderloin, San Francisco
- Founded: 1992
- Type of play: Fringe theater
- Festival date: September (annually)
- Website: www.theexit.org

The San Francisco Fringe Festival, or SF Fringe, is a fringe theater festival produced by the EXIT Theatre in San Francisco. It is one of the oldest fringe festivals in the United States. It takes place over the course of two weeks every September.

The festival was founded in 1992 by several members of BAIT (Bay Area Independent Theatre), a consortium of small theatres in San Francisco and vicinity.

Performances featured at SF Fringe are chosen by lottery. The 2017 festival featured about 150 performances by more than 35 theater companies, performing in three small theater venues. Non Traditional Fringe Venues (NTFV) have included "bars and restaurants, on buses, park benches and trees". Many of the shows feature mature themes or nudity.

The conclusion of the festival features additional performances by shows chosen as the "Best of the Fringe".

== 2019 award winners ==
=== 2019 Best of Fringe Awards ===
- AEON by James Sundquist
- Get Uncomfortable Nicia De’Lovely
- HICK: A Love Story, The Romance of Lorena Hickok & Eleanor Roosevelt by Terry Baum & Lilith Women's Theater
- I Favor My Daddy by Jamie Brickhouse
- The Magic of Ryan Kane by Ryan Kane
- My Will and My Life by Harry Cronin, Page 86 Productions, John Tranchitella
- Why My Unicorn Left Me by Resonance

=== 2019 Tech Awards ===
- Barbara Holoway Volunteer Award: David Kirby
- Big Tips Award: Glen Micheletti
- Curtis Overacre über Tech Award: Michelle Chesley
- Techie's Choice Award: Fingertips by Fingertips Variety
- Volunteer's Choice Award: Grief is Horny by Jonathan Euseppi

== 2018 award winners ==
=== 2018 Best of Fringe Awards ===
- Adam and Eve on a Raft by Book of Jones
- ALTARS FOR MY ALTERS Potatoes Mashed Comedy
- Dandy Darkly's All Aboard by Dandy Darkly
- Dangerous When Wet: Booze, Sex, and my Mother by Jamie Brickhouse
- Experts, Assholes, and True Believers by Ronen Sberlo
- Mingalaba by James Sundquist
- My Preferred Pronoun is We by Lyralen Kaye
- The Immaculate Big Bang by Bill Santiago

=== 2018 Sold Out Awards ===
- Adam and Eve on a Raft by Book of Jones
- ALTARS FOR MY ALTERS Potatoes Mashed Comedy
- Dandy Darkly's All Aboard by Dandy Darkly
- Dangerous When Wet: Booze, Sex, and my Mother by Jamie Brickhouse
- Experts, Assholes, and True Believers by Ronen Sberlo
- Mingalaba by James Sundquist
- Put a Little Shimmer in Your Life by Joan Chaplick
- The Immaculate Big Bang by Bill Santiago
- The Mermaid's Tears by Evelyn Jean Pine
- The Secret Language by Allen Gittelson

== 2017 award winners ==
=== 2017 Best of Fringe Award Winners with Encore Performances ===
- Dandy Darkly's Myth Mouth! by Dandy Darkly
- Expeditious Intent by James Sundquist
- Nigga-Roo by Dazie-Grego Sykes

=== 2017 Best of Fringe Awards ===
- An Audience With Shurl by Sue Bevan Theatre
- BLACK! by Michael Washington Brown
- Dandy Darkly's Myth Mouth! by Dandy Darkly
- Even If It's Wrong by Todd Pickering
- Expeditious Intent by James Sundquist
- Hitler in the Green Room by K.S. Haddock
- Homeful by Amy Mihyang Ginther
- Keeping Up With the Jorgensons by Jeremy Julian Greco
- Nigga-Roo by Dazie-Grego Sykes
- Tasha by Cat Brooks
- Why Would I Mispronounce My Own Name? by Irma Herrera
- You Fucking Earned It by Naked Empire Bouffon.

=== 2017 Tech Awards ===
- Barbara Holoway Volunteer Award: Denise Dee
- Big Tips Award: Glen Micheletti
- Curtis Overacre über Tech Award: Tyler Null
- Techie's Choice Award: An Audience With Shurl by Sue Bevan Theatre

=== 2017 SOLD OUT Awards ===
Given to shows which sold all seats to a performance.

- $wampland by Other Voices and Playwright's Center of SF - 1 award
- Hitler in the Green Room by K.S. Haddock - 3 awards

== See also ==
- Elastic Future
- EXIT Theatre
