= Maria Viktorovna =

Russian-American YouTuber and ASMR artist

- Born: July 22, 1986 (age 40); Lipetsk, Lipetsk Oblast, Soviet Union
- Other name: Gentle Whispering
- Occupation: YouTuber

YouTube information
- Channels: Gentle Whispering ASMR; Sassy Masha (vlog channel)
- Years active: 2011–present
- Genre: Autonomous sensory meridian response
- Subscribers: 2.4 million
- Views: 1.22 billion
- Last updated: August 14, 2025

Maria "Masha" Viktorovna (Note: "Viktorovna" is a patronym; her surname is not known.) (Russian: Мари́я Викторовна; born July 22, 1986), known professionally as Gentle Whispering ASMR, is a Russian-American ASMR performer and YouTube personality. Her YouTube videos are considered to be among the best-known and most popular in the ASMR genre.

== Early life ==
Maria "Masha" Viktorovna was born on July 22, 1986, in the city of Lipetsk, Russia. She has an older sister, Olga. During her childhood, Maria was active in theatre, and participated in several school plays.

== Career ==
Maria recalls her first ASMR experiences taking place while in kindergarten in central Russia, and says she felt similar relaxing and "ticklish" sensations throughout her life. In 2009, Maria had depression and anxiety during a divorce from her husband. While watching massage and meditation videos to relax, she clicked on a video of a woman whispering that was recommended by YouTube's suggestion algorithm. This video triggered the same relaxed feeling she had experienced in her youth, and she continued watching similar videos to relax. Maria recorded her own whisper video in February 2011, deleting it soon after. However, she continued recording and publishing new content; by the year's end she had amassed 30,000 subscribers.

In 2014, Maria was working as an administrative assistant in a medical office, but by 2015 she was earning enough to treat her content as a full-time job. Her channel reached one million subscribers in 2017, the first ASMR channel to do so.

One of Maria's videos was sampled in the 2014 song, "Terrors in My Head," by Canadian electronic musician Deadmau5.

== Reception and style ==
In separate articles for The Washington Post, feature writer Caitlin Gibson called Maria "the premier celebrity of a controversial but increasingly recognized phenomenon" in 2014 and "YouTube’s preeminent ASMRtist" in 2019. Maria has additionally been described as "queen of the ASMR genre," and "widely known as the grande dame of ASMR." Her videos have been recommended by the Irish Independent and Thrillist.

Maria has said that she tries "to protrude a motherly, comforting atmosphere in my videos," and make her audience feel "safe and protected." She describes receiving thank-you messages from viewers with anxiety, stress, or sleep disorders.

== Personal life ==
After divorcing her former partner, Maria met her husband, Darryl, through a Facebook group for ASMR content creators. The couple dated for five years, and married in September 2017. Maria gave birth to her first child, a daughter, in 2019. As of February 2020, she resides in El Dorado County, California. She is a certified massage therapist and formerly lived in Baltimore, Maryland. She announced in a YouTube video on March 10, 2025, that she welcomed her second child, a boy, on March 3, 2025.
