= Deniker =

Surname list

Deniker is a surname. Notable people with the surname include:

- Joseph Deniker (1852–1918), French-Russian naturalist and anthropologist
- Pierre Deniker (1917–1998), French psychiatrist

== See also ==
- Denike
