= Katie Vida =

American artist

- Education: Rhode Island School of Design (RISD), Yale University
- Known for: performance art, sound art, installation art
- Style: Multidisciplinary Artist, Contemporary Art, Conceptual Art
- Website: https://katievida.com/

Katie Vida is an American interdisciplinary artist, curator and arts educator based in Brooklyn, New York. She is best known for her performance art, installation art, film, and sound art but also known to create paintings and sculptures.

== Biography ==
Vida attended Rhode Island School of Design (RISD), graduating in 2004 with a Bachelor of Fine Arts in painting. In 2010 she graduated from Yale University with her Master of Fine Arts in painting.

Often Vida's work references artists that have come before her, such as Judy Garland and Marina Abramović. Some of the work is humorous and other work is more personal in nature. Much of her sound work involves creating sound collages with cut up recordings of songs, films, interviews and personal recordings.

Vida has exhibited work at venues including: Massachusetts Museum of Contemporary Art (MASS MoCA); Dalhousie Art Gallery (Nova Scotia); Galveston Artist Residency Gallery (Galveston, Texas); ALLGOLD MoMA PS1; Creative Time; Torrance Shipman Gallery (Brooklyn, New York); For Your Art (Los Angeles); Primetime (Brooklyn, New York); Yale University Art Gallery; and the Luggage Store Gallery (San Francisco). In 2013, she was a visiting artist at the Fanoon: Center for Printmedia Research at Virginia Commonwealth University Qatar (VCUQ). Vida participated in the (en) Gendered (in) Equity-The Gallery Poster Project, a traveling art exhibition curated by Micol Hebron.

Her experimental film shot entirely on the Snapchat application, Shelly (2019) and won the award for Best Experimental Film at the 2020 Brussels Independent Film Festival and the award for Best Underground Film from the 2020 Obskuur Ghent Film Festival.

Her curation experiences includes The Greek Play with Elastic Future (an experimental theatre company) at Root Division, San Francisco, Collision part of the 11th anniversary Mission Creek Music and Arts Festival at The LAB, Cut-Up: Contemporary Collage and Cut-Up Histories Through a Feminist Lens at Franklin Street Works and others.

Vida is an Adjunct Assistant Professor in the MFA program in Studio Art at Maine College of Art (MECA).
