= Gibi ASMR =

American ASMR performer and cosplayer

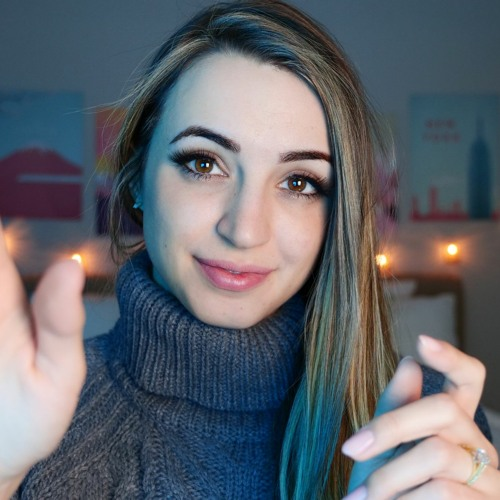
- Gibi in 2019
- Born: Gina; December 19, 1994 (age 31)
- Occupation: YouTuber
- Children: 2

YouTube information
- Channel: Gibi ASMR
- Years active: 2016–present
- Genres: Autonomous sensory meridian response; cosplay
- Subscribers: 5.21 million
- Views: 2.51 billion
- Last updated: 20 June 2026
- Website: gibiofficial.com

Gina, better known as Gibi ASMR or simply Gibi (/ˈdʒiːbiː/ JEE-bee; born December 19, 1994) is an American ASMR performer, YouTube personality, Twitch streamer, and cosplayer.

== Early life ==
Gibi has a background in theater and film, and graduated with the class of 2017 from Northwestern University's School of Communication with a Bachelor of Science in Film.

== Career ==
During the early years of ASMR content, Gibi was a high school sophomore with anxiety and insomnia when YouTube's recommendation algorithm introduced her to the genre. After watching and listening to ASMR for years, Gibi created her YouTube channel in June 2016, before her senior year of college. That summer, she began cosplaying and attending anime conventions; inspired by earlier creators, she incorporated these interests into role-play ASMR videos, which feature both existing and original characters. From the start, Gibi intended to treat video-making as a full-time job, which included taking her winter quarter off from college to focus on production. Within six months of graduating, she was earning enough to create videos full-time, and after a year reached one million subscribers.

At the suggestion of her editor, Gibi created her Twitch channel in 2017, on which she streams ASMR and plays video games. In 2019, she hosted a web miniseries by Rooster Teeth called Encounter Culture.

In 2019, Gibi would merge her management company with Double Helix Media, owned by fellow YouTuber Charles "MoistCr1TiKaL" White, to create the online talent agency Human Media Group. It was reported in April 2022 to have over 150 signed creators, 60 of which were fellow ASMR creators.

Polydor Records contacted Gibi in 2019 and asked if she would perform an ASMR read-through of Billie Eilish's album, When We All Fall Asleep, Where Do We Go?. Gibi recorded the project for free; since its upload it has amassed over 3 million views. That summer, Gibi was hired to star in Reese The Movie: A Movie About Reese, an official feature-length ASMR project about Reese's Peanut Butter Cups.

In August 2022, Gibi and MoistCr1TiKaL would further merge Human Media Group with the management team of fellow YouTuber Tyler "Jimmy Here" Collins to create the online talent agency Mana Talent Group.

== Reception ==
Gibi is considered one of YouTube's top ASMR creators. Her videos have been recommended by authors for Bustle, Den of Geek, Heavy.com, and Insider. Writing for The New York Times Magazine, Jamie Lauren Keiles called Gibi "the LeBron James of touching stuff," and wrote favorably of her genuine online persona.

== Personal life ==
Gibi takes strict privacy precautions for the sake of friends and family. In the past, she refrained from sharing her relationship status or city of residence. In 2019, Gibi married her husband, Ben, whom she met at Northwestern and today manages her business affairs. The couple relocated in January 2020, revealing their former residence was in a suburb of Chicago. In November 2020, Gibi revealed her first name as Gina. She has one son and one daughter.

Gibi appeared in the 2023 documentary film Another Body to recount her experiences with finding deepfake pornography of herself online.
