= Benjamin Wynn =

American composer, sound designer and producer

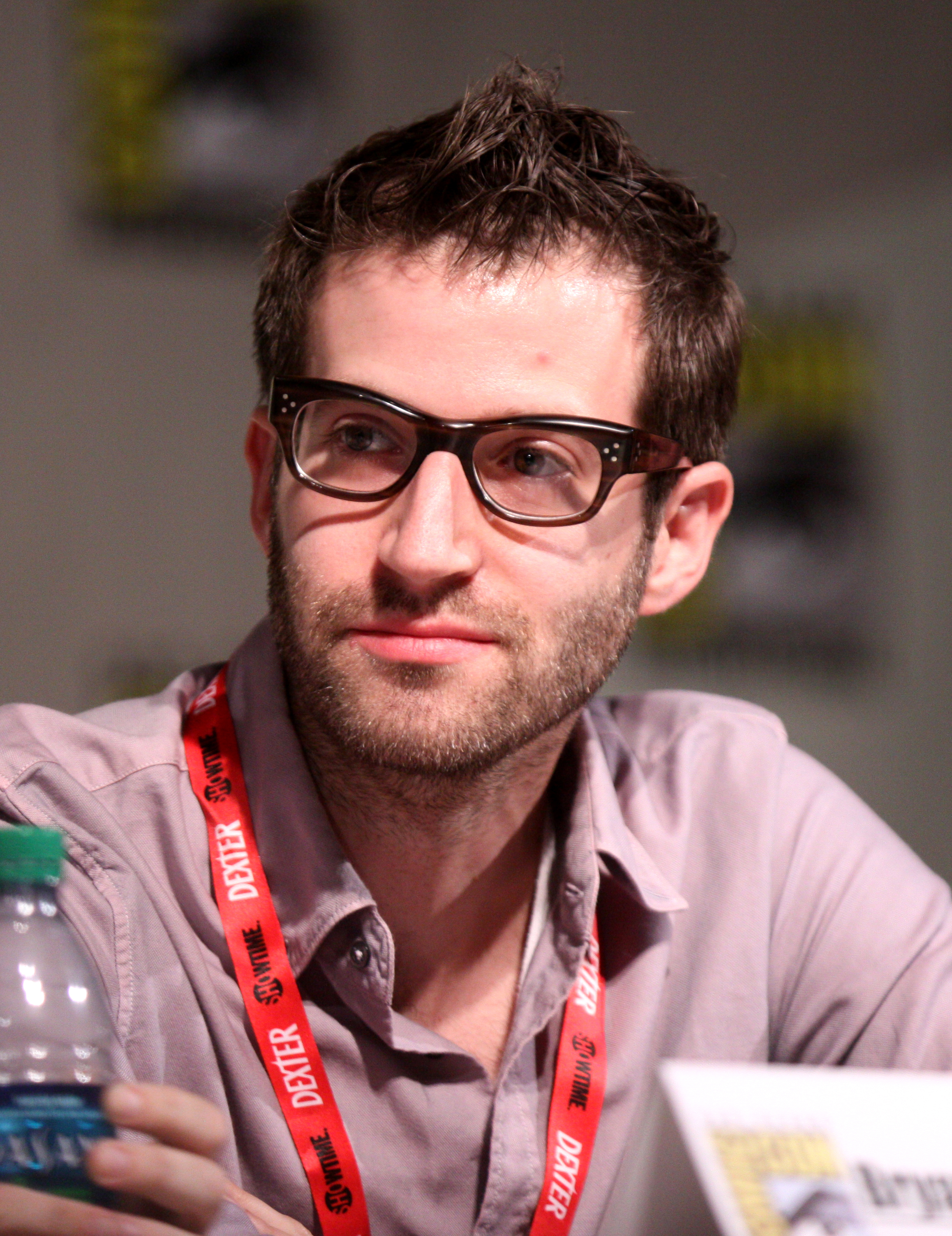
- Wynn at San Diego Comic-Con in 2011.
- Born: 1979 (age 46–47); Chicago, Illinois, US
- Other name: Deru
- Education: California Institute of the Arts
- Occupations: Composer; producer; sound Designer; disk jockey
- Years active: 2004–present
- Musical career
- Genres: Electronic; hip hop; classical; world
- Labels: Friends of Friends; Mush; Merck; Neo Ouija
- Website: deru.la

Benjamin Wynn (Benjamin Matfield Wynn, born 1979), known also as Deru, is an American composer, sound designer and music producer mostly known for creating the sound design for the TV series Avatar: The Last Airbender. He has collaborated with composers such as Joby Talbot, Jeremy Zuckerman and The Echo Society. He also produces electronic music under the name "Deru". He is the grandson of neurosurgeon Joseph Ransohoff.

== Background ==
Wynn studied electronic music at the California Institute of the Arts, where he focused on synthesis, signal processing, acoustics, music theory and composition, and earned a bachelor's degree in music technology.

== Career ==
=== The Track Team ===
In 2004, Wynn became a co-owner of a Los Angeles music and sound design company called The Track Team, which started with co-founder Jeremy Zuckerman. He was the force behind the sound design for all three seasons of Nickelodeon's hit television show, Avatar: The Last Airbender, which won a Peabody Award in 2008. Wynn was nominated for a Motion Picture Sound Editor's Golden Reel award in 2009 for his sound design work on the show.

They have later created music for another Nickelodeon TV series, Kung Fu Panda: Legends of Awesomeness. For their work on the show, Wynn and Zuckerman received four Daytime Emmy Award nominations in the sound editing category, of which they won two in 2012 and 2015.

Wynn and Zuckermann then worked together on other projects, such as score for the feature films Just Peck and A Leading Man, and also music and sound design for DC Comics shorts. Wynn also worked on the sound design for The Legend of Korra, the sequel to Avatar: The Last Airbender, though he did not participate in score production.

In 2017, it was announced on The Track Team's Facebook page that Wynn and Zuckerman had decided to dissolve their company to pursue their own creative endeavors.

=== The Echo Society ===
Wynn is a founding member and Creative Director of The Echo Society, a Los Angeles-based composer collective and non-profit organization that premieres new orchestral works in singular, one-night only events throughout Los Angeles. The Echo Society's shows bring orchestral and electronic sheet music to new audiences through uniquely immersive experiences. The collective consists of composers Joseph Trapanese, Rob Simonsen, Jeremy Zuckerman, Nathan Johnson, Eskmo, and Judson Crane, as well as sound engineer Satoshi Noguchi and visual artist Effixx.

In 2023, The Echo Society scored Darren Aronofsky's Postcard from Earth for the Sphere in Las Vegas. Wynn was a composer and score producer for the film. The score was orchestrated by Robert Ames and performed by the London Contemporary Orchestra, an 85-piece orchestra and 40-piece choir. It was recorded by Francesco Donadello at Studio 1 at the world-famous Abbey Road Studios. The movie premiered at the Sphere in Las Vegas on October 6, 2023.

=== Deru ===
Benjamin Wynn also works as an independent electronic music producer under the name "Deru", which comes from an Indo-European root of words like "duration" and "tree".

In 2007, he collaborated with British composer Joby Talbot on the score to Wayne McGregor's ballet, "Genus", based on Charles Darwin's book, On the Origin of Species, commissioned by the Paris Opera Ballet; the eight-part score combines electronics with a 10-part choir and string instruments. The ballet premiered at the Palais Garnier in October 2007 and was commissioned for a second round of performances in November 2009. The score is available on Ant-Zen and Dear Oh Dear Records and was featured in the 2009 documentary La Danse: The Paris Opera Ballet. Genus had its North American premiere by the National Ballet of Canada at the Four Seasons Centre in March 2017 in Toronto, Canada.

In 2010, Deru and fellow electronic music producer Free the Robots joined the electronic music group The Glitch Mob on their nationwide "Drink the Sea" tour.

Deru scored the music and curated the soundtrack for the feature-length film, Outliers, Vol. I: Iceland. The score is based on his field recordings from a trip to Iceland in October 2011. The film premiered in Chicago in July 2012.

As Deru, Wynn is signed to the label Friends of Friends and has released three albums on Mush Records, Merck Records and Neo Ouija, and also many remixes and tracks for compilations for labels like Hometapes, Ghostly International, Hymen Records, 1320 Records, Unseen, and Mille Plateaux. His album, 1979, was released on June 17, 2014, as a limited-edition sculptural object, featuring nine tracks by Wynn and accompanied by nine short films by video artist Anthony Ciannamea, that are housed in a custom handheld video projector. He released another album, Torn In Two, on October 19, 2018.

In 2018, Deru scored the music for the American science fiction web television show, Impulse. The series was executive produced by Lauren LeFranc, Doug Liman, David Bartis, and Gene Klein.

In 2019, Deru won a Webby award for his score for the Marvel podcast, “Wolverine: The Long Night”.

He also composed the music for a digital arts installation by Julie Weitz that was entitled Touch Museum and inspired by the phenomenon known as autonomous sensory meridian response.
