= Root Division =

Arts nonprofit organization in San Francisco

- Formation: 2002; 24 years ago
- Type: Arts nonprofit
- Headquarters: 1131 Mission Street, San Francisco, California, U.S.
- Coordinates: 37.779471°N 122.411705°W
- Executive Director: Michelle Mansour
- Website: rootdivision.org

Root Division is an American arts nonprofit 501(c)(3) organization founded in 2002. It is located in San Francisco, California. They provide a gallery space for exhibition opportunities to emerging and mid-career artists. It also provides art classes, artist residencies, and art studio space.

== History ==
The organization was founded in 2002, by three graduates of San Francisco Art Institute. For many years it operated out of the 3175 17th Street building in the Mission District, a 7,000-square-foot space owned by the nonprofit Seven Teepees. Due to gentrification and a steep rise in rent, Root Division had to leave the building in 2015.

They were awarded funds from the city and county of San Francisco's Nonprofit Displacement Mitigation Fund, as well as fund raised for the expenses of moving and remodeling to their new location at 1131 Mission Street in the Mid-Market/South of Market neighborhood. The new location is a 13,000-square-foot building, almost doubling their space.

== Background ==
Root Division is located in a building on Mission Street at 7th Street in Mid-Market neighborhood, and provide a gallery space for rotating exhibitions. Many of their exhibitions are led by independent and emerging curators, as well as hosting art fundraisers and auctions. Art classes hosted are for both adults and youth. It has 22 artists’ studios, occupied by some 28 artists (some studios are shared). The Root Division artist residencies last for up to 2 years.

Since 2007, Michelle Mansour is the executive director of the organization.

== Notable associated people ==
- Ellen Bepp
- Shaghayegh Cyrous
- Dean Dempsey
- Elastic Future, experimental theater group
- Amy Ellingson
- Midori (author)
- Noah Scalin
- Keyvan Shovir
- Katie Vida
- Julie Weitz
