= Dean Dempsey =

American artist, actor and filmmaker

Dean Dempsey (born 1986) is an American visual artist, actor, and filmmaker based in New York City. His art practice spans a range of media including photography, painting, drawing and video. He is also the writer and director of his debut feature film Candy Apple (2015), for which he won the NY Perspectives Award at the Winter Film Awards the following year. Dempsey later directed and co-wrote his second feature-length movie Deadman's Barstool (2018), and played lead actor in Flasher (in post-production) . In 2018, he was featured in New York Magazine's "The Cut - They Seem Cool" column entitled, "The Painter Who Loves To Hate The Art World."

== Life and career ==
Dempsey was born in Tucson, Arizona. He received his BFA from the San Francisco Art Institute in 2009 with study at the Chelsea College of Art and Design in London in 2008. He went on to do a residency at the Villa Waldberta in Feldafing, Germany in 2012, which resulted in the exhibition Next Generation: Contemporary American Photography at Munich's Pasinger Fabrik & Amerika Haus that same year. Dempsey's studio is in Orchard Street, New York City. His first two-artist exhibition in the New York City was held at the BOSI Contemporary gallery in 2012, curated by Renato Miracco and entitled Mutatio. This was followed in 2013 by his first solo exhibition there.

== Exhibitions ==
- 2007 - Another Country, Worth Ryder Gallery, University of California, Berkeley, curated by Allan deSouza.
- 2007 - Regeneration, Hall of Flowers, Golden Gate Park, San Francisco
- 2009 - Dislocation, Exploration and Meaning Gallery 39K, Lahore, Pakistan.
- 2009 - Re-Think, Matisonn Burgin: Shoreditch Space, London
- 2010 - Counterpoint 2010, Togonon Gallery, San Francisco.
- 2010 - Borders, Root Division, San Francisco
- 2011 - Dean Dempsey: Selected Works, solo exhibition, Togonon Gallery, San Francisco
- 2012 - Dean Dempsey, solo exhibition, MC2Gallery, Milan, Italy.
- 2012 - En Foco: Selected Works from the Permanent Collection, Art Museum of the Americas, Washington, D.C.
- 2012 - Next Generation: Contemporary American Photography, Pasinger Fabrik & Amerika Haus, Munich, Germany.
- 2012 - Art Stays 2012, 10th Festival of Contemporary Art, with MC2 Gallery, Ptuj, Slovenia.
- 2012 - En Foco: Selected Works from the Permanent Collection, Aljira Center for Contemporary Art, Newark, New Jersey
- 2012 - Mutatio, two-artist exhibition with Max Glaser, Bosi Contemporary, New York City, curated by Renato Miracco.
- 2013 - Dean Dempsey, solo exhibition, Bosi Contemporary, New York City
- 2013 - Vital Signs: The Enigma of Identity, Pelham Art Center, Pelham, New York, curated by Lisa Banner and Kathleen Monaghan.
- 2014 - 5 Year Anniversary Show, Ever Gold Gallery, San Francisco
- 2016 - "Black", Two-person exhibit, Spring/Break Art Show, New York, NY, curated by Kara Brooks.

== Collections ==
Dempsey's work is held in the collections of:

- Crocker Art Museum, Sacramento, California
- Kinsey Institute, Bloomington, Indiana
- En Foco, New York City
