= Makenna Kelly =

American social media influencer

- Born: Makenna Kelly; August 10, 2005 (age 21)
- Occupation: Social media influencer

Instagram information
- Page: lifewithmak2005
- Followers: 240 thousand

TikTok information
- Page: k.makenna
- Followers: 260 thousand
- Last updated: Oct 9, 2024

Makenna Kelly is an American social media influencer. She began her career doing ASMR videos on YouTube, and she is best known for her viral video eating honeycomb. Kelly has since shifted her focus to TikTok, where she mainly creates lifestyle and beauty content. She is no longer active on YouTube.

== Career ==
Kelly created her channel in March 2018, and only after this time did her parents learn about the channel.

Kelly was part of the class of 2018 for Teen Vogue's "21 Under 21" and was featured on Variety's 2019 Young Hollywood Impact Report. In 2019, she starred in the Inside Edition episode "Meet the 13-Year-Old who makes ASMR videos for YouTube", and made an appearance at the 40th Annual Young Artist Awards as a nominee for a Young Artist Award.

In 2021, she partnered with the fast fashion brand Shein doing haul videos with the company's products. Kelly collaborated with Trendolla Jewelry to create her personal jewelry collection: 'Life With MaK Honeycomb & "Bee" kind Jewelry Set' in November 2022.

Kelly acted in YouTube reality series "The Glo Show," produced by in Far Out Studios August 2021. She is also known for the Access Hollywood episodes "How 13-Year-Old Makenna Kelly is Changing YouTube One Whisper at a Time" and "Life With MaK Wants to do an ASMR Collab with Cardi B and Ariana Grande."

Kelly has modeled for Colorado-based clothing retailer Something New Boutique, and has modeled for the makeup brand Petite n Pretty. She attended Coco Rocha's model camp in 2023.

Kelly stated online in 2026 that she had earned her esthetician license.

== Work ==
In the videos Kelly records a range of sounds that can be soothing. As of 2019 her YouTube channel had over 1.4 million subscribers, and she is particularly known for a video where she recorded sounds while eating honeycomb. Some of Kelly's videos have been removed from YouTube because the automated filtering algorithms deemed them inappropriate. The videos in question had been flagged by the magazine Wired. After the videos were removed Kelly's parents stopped allowing her to read the incoming messages requesting content.

== Personal life ==
Kelly lived in Fort Collins, Colorado. She graduated from high school in 2023. Kelly has stated online that she moved to Florida in late 2025 after an alleged family incident of domestic abuse.
