= Elastic Future =

- Formation: 2004; 22 years ago
- Type: experimental theatre company
- Location: London, England
- Artistic director(s): Marc Blinder, Erin Gilley

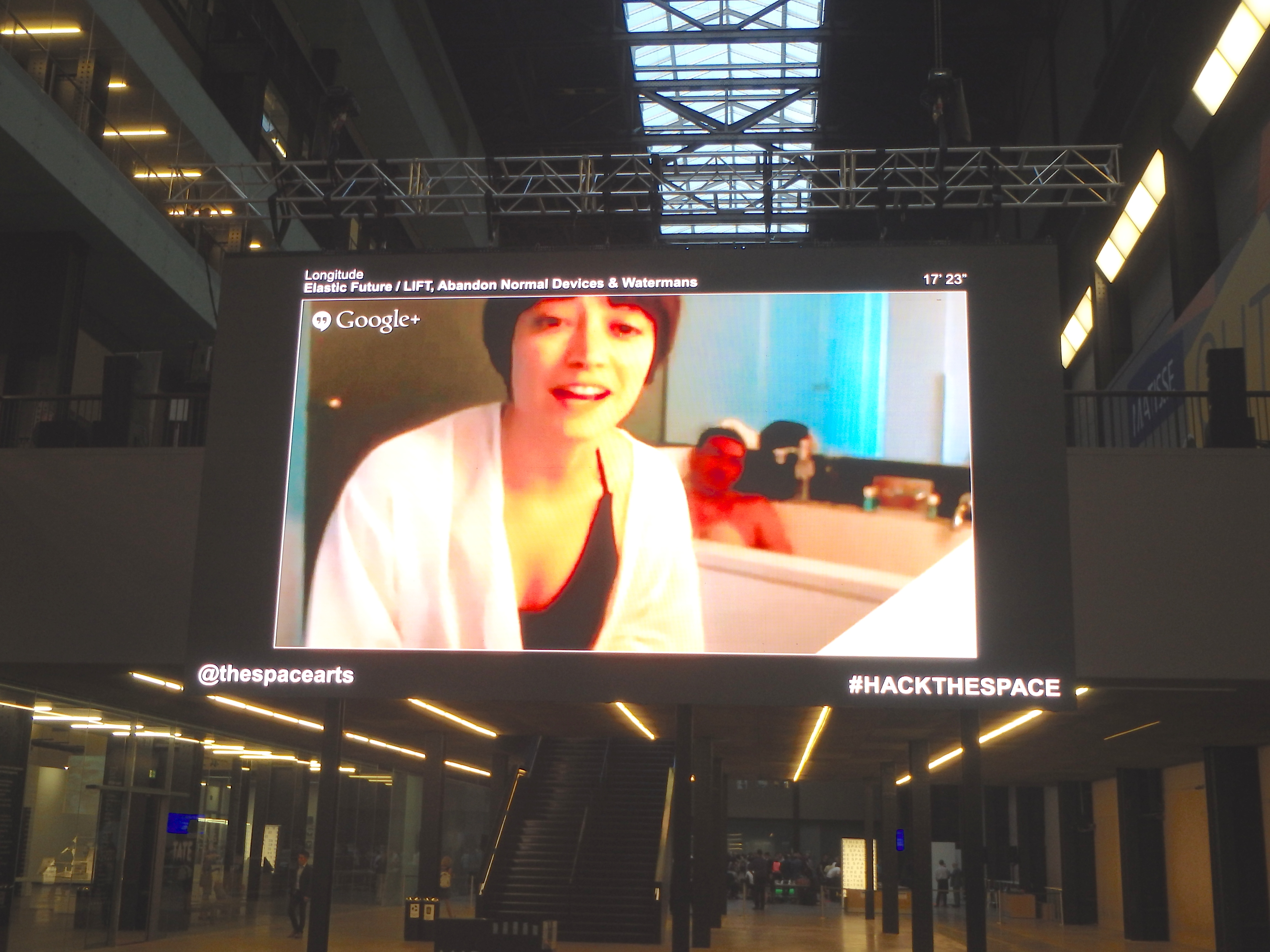
Longitude Episode 1 (2014) playing in the Turbine Hall at the Tate Modern

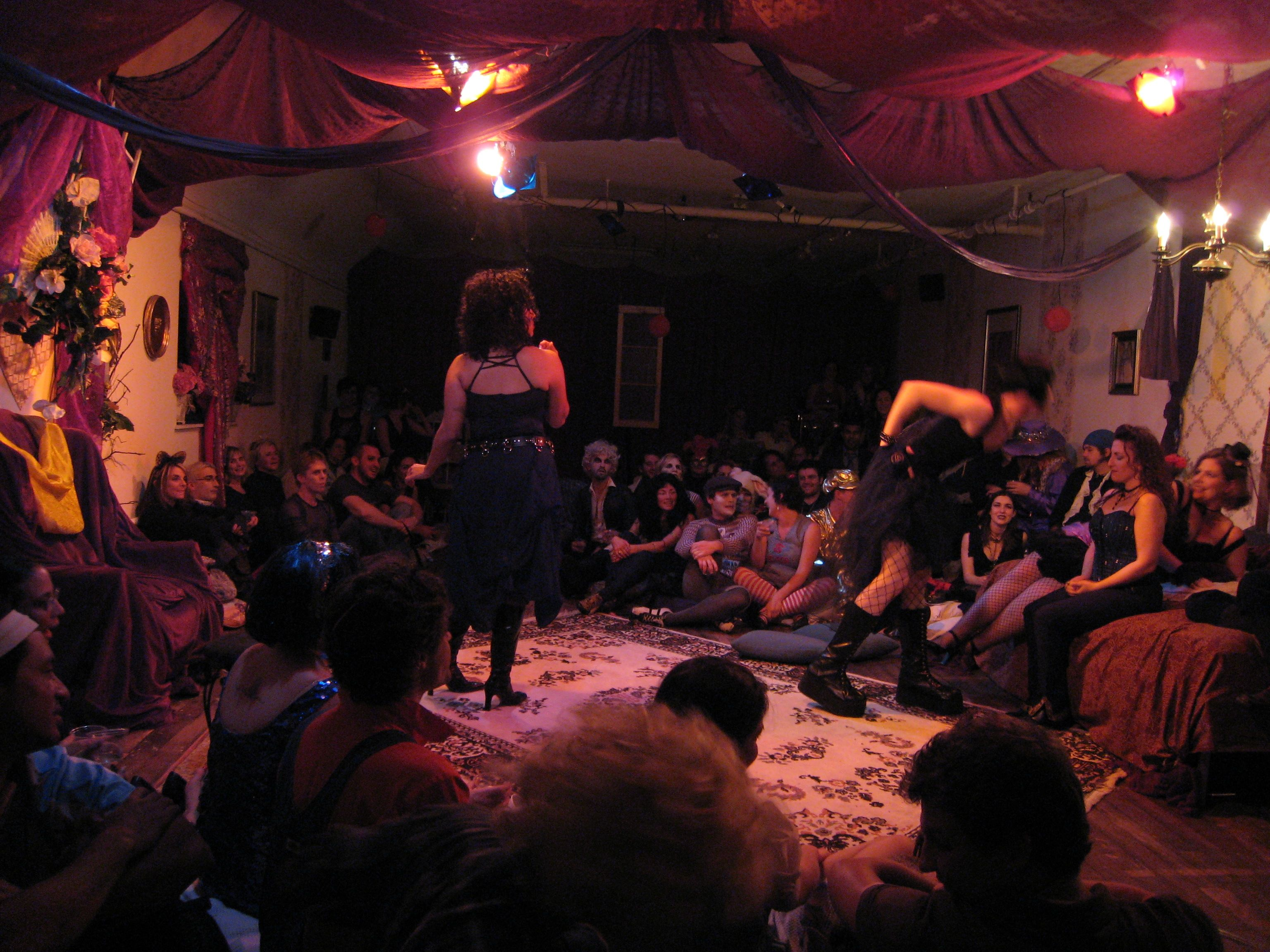
Denmo Ibrahim and Flynn Witmeyer addressing the audience during Beautiful Redux (2007).

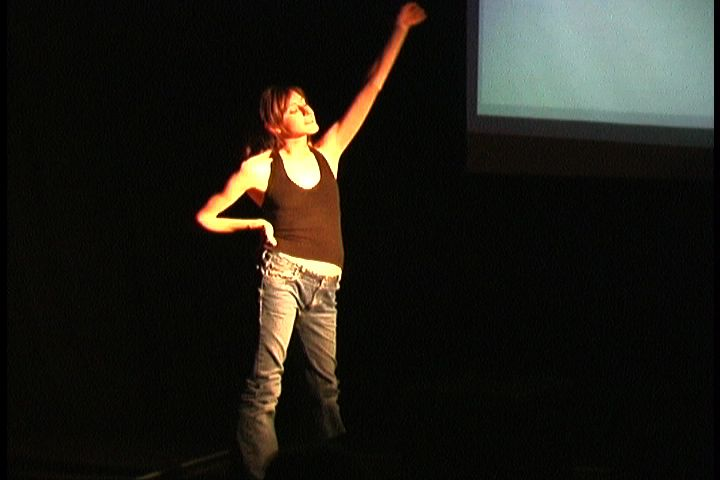
Erin Carter in Abducted (2014) for the San Francisco Fringe Festival

Elastic Future is an experimental theatre company founded in San Francisco with the aim of making plays more accessible to a non-theater visiting audience. Founded in 2004, it moved to London in 2011.

== History ==
Elastic Future was founded by creative director, Marc Blinder, and artistic director, Erin Gilley, with a founding team of artists including Josh Peek, Randy Sterns, Connie Hwong, Evren Odcikin, and Sara Razavi. Later the company added Wesley Cabral and Denmo Ibrahim.

Elastic Future's use of Google Hangouts on Air to create digital theatre in Peek A Boo and Longitude, was described as "a world first" and "a brand new art form." Longitude was covered in Vice (magazine). Longitude was conceived, rehearsed and performed entirely online, using Google Hangouts, with a cast in London, Barcelona and Lagos. Elastic Future had earlier experimented with this format in Peek A Boo which used performers in New York City, London, and Beirut.

== Artworks ==
June 2014, "Longitude", London International Festival of Theatre and The Space commissioned Elastic Future to make a digital performance for LIFT 2014 using actors in London, Barcelona and Lagos, Nigeria. Longitude aired as a series of three live online performances during LIFT 2014.

July 2013, "Peek A Boo", created by Elastic Future in partnership with LIFT. "Peek a Boo" was an experiment using Google Hangouts On Air to perform live theatre with a cast of actors from New York City, London and Beirut. Peek A Boo tells the story of two computer programmers, one webcam girl, an NSA agent and a GCHQ agent.

April 2011, "The Lily’s Revenge", Elastic Future worked with the Magic Theatre, to produce The Lily’s Revenge, a 5-hour play written by Taylor Mac. It included elements circus, live music, animation and dance. Over 40 performers and 6 directors participated in the creation of this show. The Lily's Revenge was a political satire created in response to the political debate around California's Prop 8.

February 2008, "Not Eye", A video and performance installation, was presented as part of the art gallery Root Division’s show Blackout. Blackout was an exhibition of self-illuminating work shown in a darkened art gallery.

October 2007, "Beautiful Redux", a remounting of the original production from 2005. Beautiful mixed elements of cabaret and drag show with theatre. Beautiful Redux was described as "decadent, loud, and possibly audience-fondling" by the SF Weekly.

January 2007, "The Greek Play", one part art exhibition and one part play. Directed by Evren Odcikin and curated by artist Katie Vida.

April 2006, "The Unauthorized Autobiography of Kim Deal", a hybrid rock concert/play performed at Amnesia (in San Francisco's Mission district). This play was intended as commentary on celebrity culture and the mythology people build around their heroes. The show tells a completely fictionalized story of the lives of Kim and Kelley Deal. The show paired live theatre with members of the band Fans of Jimmy Century playing live The Pixies and The Breeders covers.
