= ASMR =

Phenomena of sensory perception

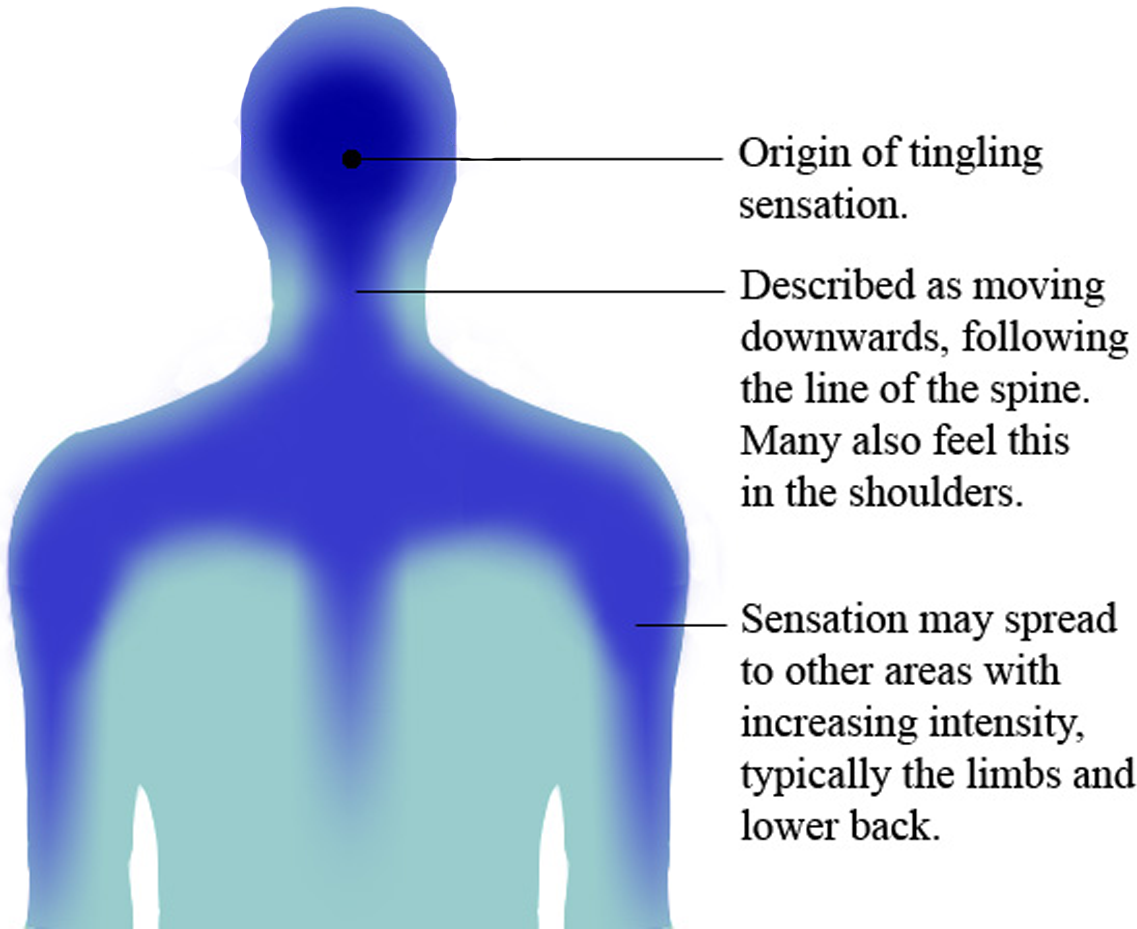
An illustration of the route of ASMR's tingling sensation

An autonomous sensory meridian response (ASMR) is a tingling sensation and pleasant form of paresthesia, that usually begins on the scalp and moves down the back of the neck and upper spine. ASMR has been compared with synesthesia and may overlap with frisson. ASMR is a subjective experience of "low-grade euphoria" characterized by "a combination of positive feelings and a distinct static-like tingling sensation on the skin". It is most commonly triggered by specific auditory and visual stimuli, and less commonly by intentional attention control.

The term can also refer to media (usually audiovisual) meant to evoke this phenomenon, with the sensation itself being informally referred to as "tingles".

== Etymology ==
Although many colloquial and formal terms used and proposed between 2007 and 2010 included reference to orgasm, a significant majority objected to its use among those active in online discussions. Many differentiate between the euphoric, relaxing nature of ASMR and sexual arousal. However, the argument for sexual arousal persists, and some proponents have published videos categorized as "ASMRotica" (ASMR erotica), which are deliberately designed to be sexually stimulating.

Early proponents of ASMR concluded that the phenomenon was generally unrelated to sexual arousal. In 2010, Jennifer Allen, a participant in an online forum, proposed that the phenomenon be named "autonomous sensory meridian response". Allen chose the words intending or assuming them to have the following specific meanings:

- Autonomous – spontaneous, self-governing, with or without control
- Sensory – about the senses or sensation
- Meridian – signifying a peak, climax, or point of highest development
- Response – referring to an experience triggered by something external or internal

Allen confirmed in a 2016 interview that she purposely selected these terms because they were more objective, comfortable, and clinical, rather than alternative terms for the sensation. In that interview, Allen explained she selected the word meridian to replace the word orgasm and said she had found a dictionary that defined meridian as "a point or period of highest development, greatest prosperity, or the like".

== Sensation ==
The subjective experience, sensation, and perceptual phenomenon of ASMR is described by some of those susceptible to it as "akin to a mild electrical current ... or the carbonated bubbles in a glass of champagne". The tingling sensation on one's skin in general, called paresthesia, is referred to by ASMR enthusiasts as "tingles" when experienced along the scalp, neck, and back. It has been described as "a static tingling sensation originating from the back of the head, then propagating to the neck, shoulder, arm, spine, and legs, which makes people feel relaxed and alert".

=== Variance ===
Since little scientific research has been conducted into potential neurobiological correlations to the perceptual phenomenon, personal commentary from forums, blog posts, and video comments have been analyzed to describe the phenomenon. Analysis of this anecdotal evidence support the original consensus that ASMR is euphoric but non-sexual, and it has divided those who experience ASMR into two broad categories of subjects. One category depends upon external triggers to experience the localized sensation and its associated feelings, which typically originate in the head, often reaching down the neck and sometimes the upper back. The other category can intentionally augment the sensation and feelings without dependence upon external stimuli through attentional control, in a manner that some subjects likened to their experience of meditation.

== Triggers ==
ASMR is usually precipitated by stimuli referred to as "triggers" or "ASMR triggers", which are most commonly auditory and visual, may be encountered through the interpersonal interactions of daily life. Additionally, ASMR is often triggered by exposure to specific audio and video. Such media may be specially made with the specific purpose of triggering ASMR, or created for other purposes and later discovered to be effective as a trigger.

Stimuli that can trigger ASMR, as reported by those who experience it, include the following:

- Listening to a softly spoken or whispering voice
- Listening to a person blow or exhale into a microphone
- Listening to mouth sounds, such as quiet clicking of the tongue or tisking
- Listening to tapping, typically with one's acrylic nails onto hard surfaces
- Listening to buttons being pressed, mostly those of computer keyboard typing or video game controllers
- Listening to quiet, repetitive sounds resulting from someone engaging in a mundane task, such as turning the pages of a book
- Watching somebody attentively execute a mundane task, such as preparing food
- Receiving personal attention, such as having one's makeup applied, hair styled, or a medical exam performed.
- Listening to the sound of rain or firewood burning and other natural sounds
- Listening to "crinkly" items such as paper, clothes, and substances such as styrofoam
- Listening to certain types of music
- "Unlikely triggers" like laughing or smiling

A 2017 study of 130 survey respondents found that lower-pitched, complex sounds, and slow-paced, detail-focused videos are especially effective triggers.

=== Auditory ===
The effect can reportedly be triggered by whispering.

Many of those who experience ASMR report that non-vocal ambient noises performed through human activities are also effective triggers of ASMR. Examples of such noises include fingers scratching or tapping a surface, brushing hair, hands rubbing together or manipulating fabric, the crushing of eggshells, the crinkling and crumpling of a flexible material such as paper, or writing. Many YouTube videos that are intended to trigger ASMR responses feature a single person performing these actions and the sounds that result.

=== Personal attention ===
In addition to the effectiveness of specific auditory stimuli, many subjects report that ASMR is triggered by the receipt of tender personal attention, often comprising combined physical touch and vocal expression, such as when having their hair cut, nails painted, ears cleaned, or back massaged while the service provider speaks quietly to the recipient.

Furthermore, many of those who have experienced ASMR during these and other comparable encounters with a service provider report that watching an "ASMRtist" simulate the provision of such personal attention, acting directly to the camera as if the viewer were the recipient of a simulated service, is sufficient to trigger it.

=== Clinical ===
Among the category of intentional ASMR videos that simulate the provision of personal attention is a subcategory wherein the "ASMRtist" is specifically depicted providing clinical or medical services, including routine general medical examinations. The creators of these videos make no claims to the reality of what is depicted, and the viewer is intended to be aware that they are watching and listening to a simulation performed by an artist. Nonetheless, many viewers attribute therapeutic outcomes to these and other categories of intentional ASMR videos, and there are numerous anecdotal reports of their effectiveness in inducing sleep for those susceptible to insomnia, and assuaging a range of symptoms, including those associated with depression, anxiety and panic attacks.

=== Tactile ===
In addition to audio and visual stimuli, ASMR may be caused by light touches and brushing against the skin, such as effleurage.

=== Mukbang ===
Videos where hosts eat large amounts of food on camera, often incorporates sounds of ASMR. Mukbang ASMR includes sounds of chewing and swallowing, which can be experienced as pleasant and calming.

== Background and history ==
=== Contemporary ===
The contemporary history of ASMR began on 19 October 2007 on a discussion forum for health-related subjects at a website called Steady Health. A 21-year-old registered user with the handle "okaywhatever" submitted a post describing having experienced a specific sensation since childhood, comparable to that stimulated by tracing fingers along the skin, yet often triggered by seemingly random and unrelated non-haptic events, such as "watching a puppet show" or "being read a story".

Replies to this post indicated that a significant number of other people had experienced the sensation described by "okaywhatever", also in response to witnessing mundane events. These interchanges precipitated the formation of a number of web-based locations intended to facilitate further discussion and analysis of the phenomenon, for which there were plentiful anecdotal accounts.

=== Earlier ===
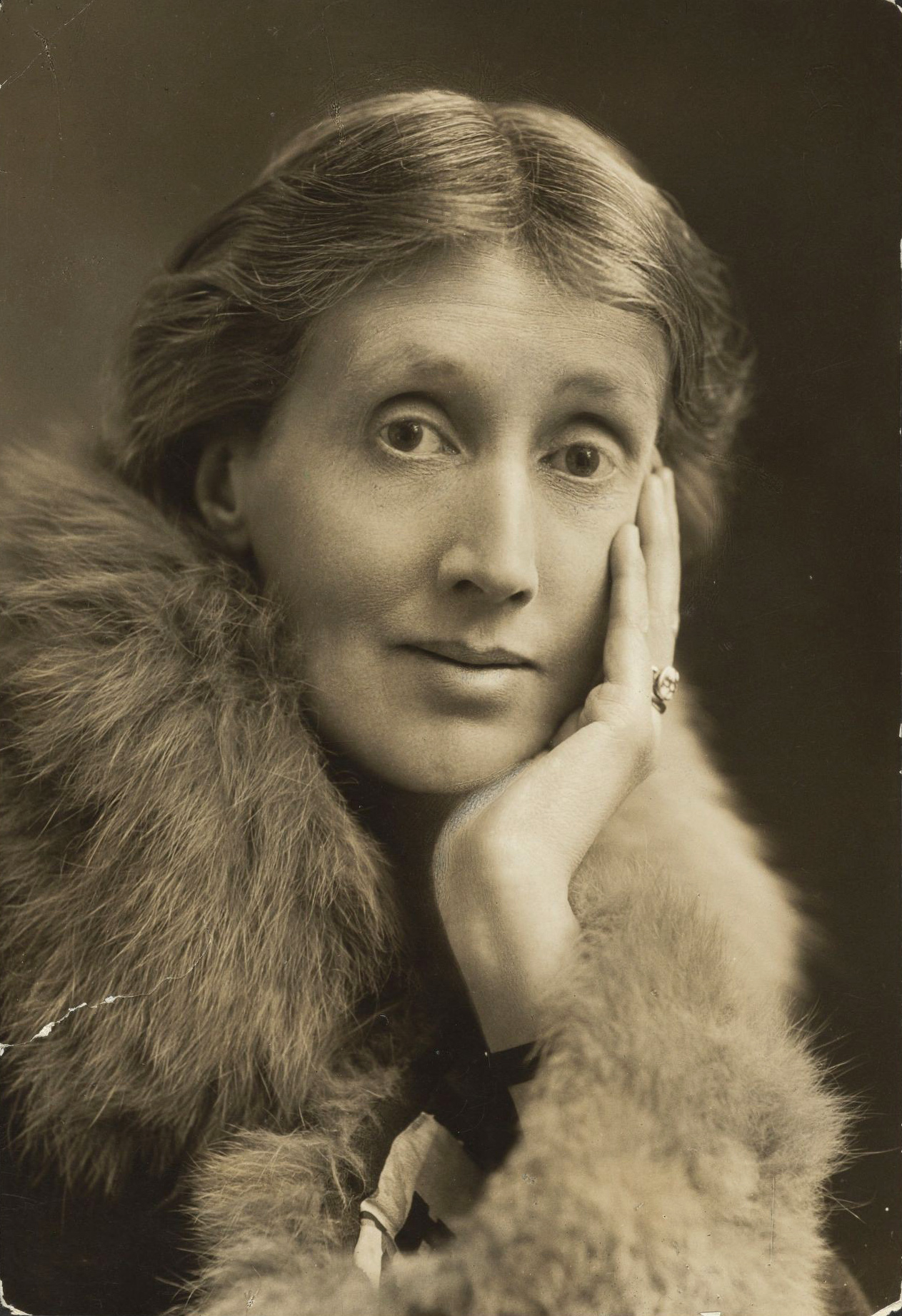
Virginia Woolf's novel Mrs Dalloway contains a passage describing something that may be comparable to ASMR.

Clemens J. Setz suggests that a passage from the novel Mrs Dalloway, written by Virginia Woolf and published in 1925, depicts something comparable: A stranger in a park is spelling a word out loud while standing close to the ear of one of the central characters. She is described as speaking "deeply, softly, like a mellow organ, but with a roughness in her voice like a grasshopper's, which rasped his spine deliciously and sent running up into his brain waves of sound". According to Setz, this passage alludes to the effectiveness of the human voice and soft or whispered vocal sounds as a trigger of ASMR for many of those who experience it, as demonstrated by comments posted to YouTube videos that depict someone speaking softly or whispering, typically directly to the camera.

There is no known source for the origin of ASMR because it has yet to be identified as having biological correlations. Even so, a majority of descriptions of ASMR by those who experience it compare the sensation to that precipitated by a tender physical touch, providing such examples as having one's hair cut or combed. This has led to the conjecture that ASMR might be related to the act of grooming. For example, David Huron, a professor in the School of Music at Ohio State University, states:

[The "ASMR effect" is] clearly strongly related to the perception of non-threat and altruistic attention [and has a] strong similarity to physical grooming in primates [who] derive enormous pleasure (bordering on euphoria) when being groomed by a grooming partner ... not to get clean, but rather to bond with each other.

Imaging subjects' brains with fMRI as they reported experiencing ASMR tingles suggests support for this hypothesis, because brain areas such as the medial prefrontal cortex (associated with social behaviors including grooming) and the secondary somatosensory cortex (associated with the sensation of touch) were activated more strongly during tingling periods than control periods.

== Media ==
=== Videos ===
An ASMR video demonstrating multiple triggers

The most popular source of stimuli reported by subjects to be effective in triggering ASMR is video. Videos reported being effective in triggering ASMR generally fall into two categories: intentional and unintentional. Intentional media is created by those known as "ASMRtists" to deliberately trigger ASMR in viewers and listeners. Unintentional media that is made for other reasons, often before attention was drawn to the phenomenon in 2007, but which some subjects discover to be effective in triggering ASMR. Examples of unintentional media include British author John Butler and American painter Bob Ross. In Ross's episodes of his television series The Joy of Painting, both broadcast and on YouTube, his soft, gentle speaking mannerisms and the sound of his painting and his tools triggers the effect in some viewers. The work of stop-motion filmmaker PES is also often noted.

A genre of videos intended to induce ASMR has emerged in the 21st century, approximately 25 million of which had been published on YouTube by 2022, and categories of dedicated live ASMR streams exist on Twitch, Kick, Instagram, and TikTok. Several online content creators have risen to fame from posting content surrounding ASMR, including YouTubers like Jojo's ASMR, Gibi ASMR and Gentle Whispering (Maria Viktorovna), who had 5.21, 5.2 and 2.42 million subscribers in 2026, respectively.

=== Binaural recordings ===
An ASMR role play video with binaural audio

Some ASMR video creators use binaural recording techniques to simulate the acoustics of a three-dimensional environment, reported to elicit in viewers and listeners the experience of being in proximity to the actor or vocalist. Binaural recordings are usually made using two microphones, just like stereo recordings. However, in binaural recordings, the two microphones tend to be more specially designed to mimic human ears. In many cases, microphones are the same distance apart as the ears on a human head, and are surrounded by ear-shaped cups to mimic the acoustics of human ears.

Viewing and hearing ASMR videos that comprise ambient sound captured through binaural recording has been compared to the reported effect of listening to binaural beats, which are also alleged to precipitate pleasurable sensations and the subjective experience of calm and equanimity. Binaural recordings are made specifically to be heard through headphones rather than loudspeakers. When listening to sound through loudspeakers, the left and right ear can both hear the sound coming from both speakers. In contrast, when listening to sound through headphones, the sound from the left earpiece is audible only to the left ear, and the sound from the right earpiece is audible only to the right ear. In producing binaural media, the sound source is recorded by two separate microphones that remain in separate channels on the final medium, whether video or audio.

Listening to a binaural recording through headphones simulates the sound localization by which people listen to live sounds. For the listener, this experience is characterized by two perceptions. Firstly, the listener perceives themself as being near the performer and location of the sound source. Secondly, the listener perceives what is often reported as a three-dimensional sound, in which both the position and distance of the sound source relative to the microphones are perceptible, making it seem as if the listener is in place of the microphones.

The term "binaural beats" (relating to ASMR) was primarily developed by the Monroe Institute as part of Stargate Project or "Project Gateway" or "Gateway Experience"

== Verifiability ==
=== Initial skepticism ===
On 12 March 2012, Steven Novella published a post about ASMR on his blog Neurologica. Regarding the question of whether ASMR is a real phenomenon, Novella said "In this case, I don't think there is a definitive answer, but I am inclined to believe that it is. Several people seem to have independently ... experienced and described the same syndrome with some fairly specific details." Novella compared the ASMR effect to migraines. Novella, however, drew attention to the lack of scientific investigation into ASMR, suggesting that functional magnetic resonance imaging (fMRI) and transcranial magnetic stimulation technologies should be used to study the brains of people who experience ASMR in comparison to people who do not, as a way of beginning to seek scientific understanding and explanation of the phenomenon.

Four months after Novella's blog post, Tom Stafford, a lecturer at the University of Sheffield, was reported to have said that ASMR "might well be a real thing, but it's inherently difficult to research... something like this that you can't see or feel" and "doesn't happen for everyone". Stafford compared the status of ASMR with the development of attitudes toward synesthesia, which he said "for years... was a myth, then in the 1990s people came up with a reliable way of measuring it".

=== Further studies and recommendations ===
A study undertaken in 2018 attempted to determine whether ASMR truly exists or is instead a placebo. With participants who had previous exposure to ASMR and participants who did not, they concluded that with not understanding its exact mechanism and why only some individuals experience ASMR, the results were indeterminate. It has been estimated that 60% of the general population do experience ASMR and the remaining 40% do not. A 2018 commentary on the Cash et al. study concluded that consistency of measurement was important and fields where there are multiple commonly-used measures (such as in ASMR) often contain bias, meaning results are not consistent. Several recommendations were made in this study for future research including consistency tests, including descriptions submitted by participants in response to stimuli and participant control groups with different ASMR and non-ASMR stimuli examining consistency of responses. A website called Synesthete was set up for this purpose.

== Comparisons and associations with other phenomena ==
=== Synesthesia ===
Integral to the subjective experience of ASMR is a localized tingling sensation that many describe as similar to being gently touched, but which is stimulated by watching and listening to audiovisual media in the absence of any physical contact with another person. These reports have precipitated comparison between ASMR and synesthesia – a condition characterized by the excitation of one sensory modality by stimuli that normally exclusively stimulates another, such as when the hearing of a specific sound induces the visualization of a distinct color, shape, or object (a type of synesthesia called chromesthesia). Thereby, people with other types of synesthesia report, for example, "seeing sounds" in the case of auditory-visual synesthesia, or "tasting words" in the case of lexical-gustatory synesthesia.

In the case of ASMR, many report the perception of "being touched" by the sights and sounds presented on a video recording, comparable to visual-tactile and auditory-tactile synesthesia.

=== Misophonia ===
Some people have sought to relate ASMR to misophonia (a "hatred of sound"), which manifests typically as "automatic negative emotional reactions to particular sounds – the opposite of what can be observed in reactions to specific audio stimuli in ASMR".

For example, those who have misophonia often report that specific human sounds, including those made by eating, breathing, whispering, or repetitive tapping noises, can precipitate feelings of anger and disgust in the absence of any previously learned associations that might otherwise explain those reactions.

There are plentiful anecdotal reports by those who claim to have both misophonia and ASMR at multiple web-based user-interaction and discussion locations. Common to these reports is the experience of ASMR to some sounds, and misophonia in response to others.

=== Frisson ===
The tingling sensation that characterizes ASMR has been compared and contrasted to frisson.

The French word frisson signifies a brief sensation usually reported as pleasurable and often expressed as an overwhelming emotional response to stimuli, such as a piece of music. Frisson often occurs simultaneously with piloerection, colloquially known as "goose bumps", by which tiny muscles called arrector pili contract, causing body hair, particularly that on the limbs and back of the neck, to erect or "stand on end".

Although ASMR and frisson are "interrelated in that they appear to arise through similar physiological mechanisms", individuals who have experienced both describe them as qualitatively different, with different kinds of triggers. A 2018 fMRI study showed that the major brain regions already known to be activated in frisson are also activated in ASMR, and suggests that "the similar pattern of activation of both ASMR and frisson could explain their subjective similarities, such as their short duration and tingling sensation".

=== Sexuality ===
People who experience ASMR report feeling relaxed and sleepy after watching and listening to ASMR content. While some journalists and commentators have portrayed ASMR as intimate, they go on to say there is no evidence of any connection between ASMR and sexual arousal. Nevertheless, performance studies scholar Emma Leigh Waldron has noted that the links between ASMR and sexual arousal are perhaps due to the way that ASMR can engage viewers and listeners, in ambiguous relations to what she calls "mediated intimacy". 13-year-old ASMR YouTuber 'Life with MaK' had several videos deleted by YouTube in fears that they would be interpreted as sexual. In July 2026, YouTube terminated the accounts of multiple female ASMRtists who had included external links to sites such as OnlyFans and Fansly, due to it violating the sites community guidelines.

== Media and reception ==
=== Contemporary and digital art ===
ASMR has established a presence in the art world, Imogen West-Knights writing for ArtReview said that creators have found "new ways to innovate: to find new triggers for the sensations, and thereby draw more viewers to their content". In 2020, the first major exhibition on ASMR, Weird Sensation Feels Good, took place at Sweden's ArkDes architecture and design museum. In 2022, an expanded iteration of the exhibition opened at the Design Museum in London. The exhibition opened in Hong Kong in 2025. A study found that "ASMR is a case of "contemporary art operating [...] at the level of percepts and affects"." The YouTube channel "PARIS ASMR" was invited by the Louvre Museum in 2019 to use empty space at the museum to film some of his videos.

As part of a work commissioned in 2015 by Deutschlandfunk Kultur, Berlin-based artist Claire Tolan collaborated with noted composer Holly Herndon and exhibited widely in North America and Europe. She subsequently went on to work consistently in this genre. British artist Lucy Clout's single-channel video "Shrugging Offing", made for exhibition in March 2013, used the model of online ASMR broadcasts as the basis for a work exploring the female body. The first digital arts installation specifically inspired by ASMR was created by American artist Julie Weitz and called Touch Museum, which opened at the Young Projects Gallery on 13 February 2015 and comprised video screenings distributed throughout seven rooms. The music for Julie Weitz's Touch Museum's digital art installation was composed by Benjamin Wynn under his pseudonym "Deru", and was the first musical composition specifically created for a live ASMR arts event.

=== Music ===
==== Music industry ====
In what has been described as "a new era in music production", many musicians have begun to incorporate ASMR into their work. Artists Sophie Mallett and Marie Toseland created 'a live binaural sound work' composed of ASMR triggers and broadcast by Resonance FM in 2015, the listings for which advised the audience to "listen with headphones for the full sensory effect". Also in 2015, Holly Herndon, an electronic musician released an album named Platform, featuring the track "Lonely at the top." The song was a collaboration with Claire Tolan and includes common ASMR sound effects like soft whispers, fabric sounds, and clicking. Although her song was not created for ASMR listeners, the track was inspired by "the same techniques and may still trigger ASMR in some." The track "Brush" from Holly Pester's 2016 album and poetry collection Common Rest featured Tolan, exploring ASMR and its relation to lullaby.

==== Musique concrète ====
Musique concrète has been found to be relevant to ASMR due to the nature of "natural" and "cultural" existing in a non-fixed way. New materialism has also been connected to ASMR through vibration and body sensitive stimuli. Music influenced by musique concrète can evoke an ASMR experience, as with Pink Floyd's "Alan's Psychedelic Breakfast" (1970). This sensory-driven track has been retroactively described as ASMR-adjacent by critics and fans, particularly due to its immersive kitchen sounds and whispered narration.

=== Film ===
Many films have unintentionally included ASMR, reporting for Film Stories Scott Wilson reported on multiple examples of this phenomenon. These examples include the scene in the 1990 film Edward Scissorhands where Peg Boggs (Dianne Wiest) applies makeup to Edward Scissorhands (Johnny Depp). The unintentional triggers here included caring strokes and personal attention. The hair-cutting scene in the film Battle of the Sexes (2017) deliberately included several ASMR triggers. Director Jonathan Dayton stated "People work to make videos that elicit this response ... and we were wondering, 'Could we get that response in a theater full of people?'"

There have been three successfully crowdfunded projects, each based on proposals to make a film about ASMR: two documentaries and one fictional piece. As of 2025, neither of the documentaries have been completed. The fictional piece, Murmurs, directed by Graeme Cole, premiered at the Slow Film Festival in 2018, and is the first ASMR feature film. A short documentary about ASMR, Tertiary Sound, was selected to be screened at BFI London Film Festival in 2019. A scene featuring an ASMR content creator, Slight Sounds, was featured in the coming-of-age horror movie We're All Going to the World's Fair.

The first theatrically released feature film that focuses entirely on ASMR is the New Zealand psychological drama Shut Eye, which examines the relationship between an insomniac and a popular ASMR creator. The film screened at the 2022 New Zealand International Film Festival and 2023 Melbourne International Film Festival.

Multiple movies have been collaboratively recreated by Gibi ASMR. On February 27, 2021, The ASMR Bee Movie premiered on YouTube, viewable on Gibi ASMR's YouTube channel. This recreation is entirely whispered, with human ASMR creators in costumes of the original movie's characters. The full 95 minute long recreation was synced to the Netflix release of the film, with the intention of side-by-side viewing. On February 14, 2025 Gibi ASMR released Ogre ASMR, a similar collaborative recreation of the 2001 animated movie Shrek, with the same intention of side-to-side synced viewing of both films. It is reported that Gibi and her production team videod B-roll using paper cutouts in a "diorama-like" setup. Gibi deliberately chose not to use the music for copyright reasons and said in an interview that "I would be scared for DreamWorks to see this production, but I hope they see it for what it is, which is a love letter to Shrek".

=== Fictional and non-fictional works ===
==== Fictional ====
ASMR has been traced back to the 1925 novel Mrs Dalloway by Virginia Woolf, which describes a sensation similar to that of ASMR. In March 2013, the American weekly hour-long radio program This American Life broadcast the first short story on the subject of ASMR, called "A Tribe Called Rest", authored and read by American novelist and screenwriter Andrea Seigel. Children's author Renee Frances published a picture book titled "Avery Sleeps More Readily: A whispered Good Night Fairy book" in 2018. Triggers such as personal attention, whispering and caring behaviors were featured in the story.

In 2001, in her novel A Brief Stay with the Living, Marie Darrieussecq describes the sensation in several pages (see for example pp. 21–22), describing a visit to an ophthalmologist:

His hands changing the lenses again, fingers on my chin, on my temples, slow and soft, yes, a soft sensation, a wave rising along my skull, shrinking my scalp... a process of head-shrinking... my head, my brain, his fingers, letters... the absolute calm of the process (...) A soft, regular motion, something unbroken, which goes on, swinging, sleepy, to and fro, rocking... When I was little, at school, the teacher's voice, creeping to the very top of my skull, my limp hands...

==== Non-fictional ====
The Idiot's Guide series has a book on ASMR written by Julie Young and ASMRtist Ilse Blansert (aka TheWaterwhispers), published in 2015. In 2018, Dr. Craig Richard, founder of ASMR University, published a book called Brain Tingles. Writer and filmmaker Laura Nagy released Pillow Talk in 2021, an Audible Original podcast, detailing her personal experience in the world of ASMR relationship role-play as an antidote to loneliness and a coping mechanism for anxiety and trauma.

== Television ==
Date	Show	Description / Notes
31 July 2015	Would I Lie To You?	ASMR content creator ASMRAngel featured as a guest in the "This is my" round, which resulted in the reveal of the person connected to comedian Joe Lycett.
2018	Follow This	Featured ASMR along with a number of its adherents in an episode titled "The Internet Whisperers".
8 August 2018	Jimmy Kimmel Live!	Jimmy Kimmel assembled a group of youngsters who showed him various ASMR videos to explain to him how it works and why they like it so much.
3 February 2019	Anheuser-Busch commercial Super Bowl LIII	During Super Bowl LIII in 2019, Anheuser-Busch broadcast an ASMR-themed commercial for its Michelob Ultra Pure Gold beer, where Zoë Kravitz uses ASMR techniques including whispering and tapping on a Pure Gold bottle into two microphones.
3 May 2019	Real Time with Bill Maher	Host Bill Maher and musician Moby discussed and demonstrated their use of ASMR as a coping mechanism.
16 May 2019	The Good Fight	In the episode "The One About the End of the World", a law firm uses ASMR-style presentations to try to get through to a judge when they discover he is an avid follower of the phenomenon.
2019	Criminal Minds (Season 14, Episode 12 "Hamelin")	The BAU team hunts for an unknown subject who uses ASMR to persuade children to leave their homes in the middle of the night to come to meet up and voluntarily enter his van. Dr. Spencer Reid is sent a video from the unknown suspect of him making the auditory recording that he then plays from his van outside each child's house to lure them out.
2020	Brooklyn Nine-Nine (Season 7, Episode 8 "The Takeback")	Jake Peralta pretends to be an excessively soft-spoken and famous ASMRtist, helping pull off a reverse heist to put back stolen gems.
2020	Beavis and Butt-Head (Season 9, Episode 3 "Boxed In")	Beavis and Butt-Head watch a YouTube video featuring ASMRtist Gibi ASMR.

== See also ==
- Category:Practitioners of autonomous sensory meridian response
- Beat (acoustics)
- Flow (psychology)
- Foley (filmmaking)
- Music and sleep
