= Ellen Bepp =

American artist (born 1970)

Ellen Reiko Bepp (born August 25, 1970) is an American contemporary artist working in mixed media. She has been recognized for her contributions to abstract expressionism, and her work with the artist group Sansei Granddaughters.

== Biography ==
Ellen Reiko Bepp was raised in San Jose, California’s Japantown community. Bepp was born to second generation Japanese American parents who had ties with their Japanese cultural roots. She was exposed to Japanese art and culture at an early age, as she was inspired by her Japanese grandparents. Bepp grew up looking up to Yuri Kochiyama as she was one of few Asian or Asian American women that was portrayed as a leader in the media, Bepp would go on to be inspired by Kochiyama's work and use her themes in her own work. Bepp later developed an interest in the folk-art traditions of Asia and Latin America, which would lead to her doing textile art research in indigenous communities in Guatemala along with humanitarian exchanges. Bepp has sold handmade Asian-inspired clothing in a San Jose store she co-owned.

== Career ==
Since 1980, Bepp's art and hand cut paperworks have been exhibited nationally. Her works have been shown in venues such as Oakland Museum of California, the Berkeley Art Center, the Euphrat Museum of Art, Meridian Gallery, Mission Cultural Center, Jamaica Art Center of New York, SOMArts Cultural Center, Joyce Gordon Gallery, Manetti Shrem Museum of Art, and Root Division Gallery, among others.

In April 2018 Bepp got together with five San Francisco Bay Area artists, including Bepp, Shari Arai DeBoer, Reiko Fujii, Kathy Fujii-Oka and Na Omi Judy Shintani. This group had come together as they had the common history of having family members that were unjustly imprisoned in Japanese internment camps during WWII. These artists, who called themselves the Sansei Granddaughters, all had come together to honor their ancestors who had experienced injustice in the American concentration camps during WWII. The Sansei Granddaughters talk about and represent the soldiers who had fallen victim to the Japanese internment camps of WWII through art. They spread awareness of what happened and try to tell stories through their art. The Sansei Granddaughters try to raise awareness of the tragedies of war and the pain that comes with it.

=== Selected works ===
- My Will, hand cut paper, 2014
- Where Compassion Breathes, mixed media collage, 2017
- With History on Her Side, mixed media with collage, 2017
- Algo, handcut paper, 2015

=== Selected exhibitions ===
- Her Words, September 30, 2023 - January 7, 2024, The de Young Museum
- Jade Wave Rising: Portraits of Power, April 27 to May 21, 2023, SOMArts Cultural Center - Main Gallery
- Spaces of Belonging, January 26 – March 25, 2023, Euphrat Museum of Art DeAnza College
- Resisters – A Legacy of Movement– From the Japanese Incarceration, October 14, 2022 – September 18, 2023, Wing Luke Museum
