= Julie Weitz =

American visual artist (born 1979)

- Born: 1979 (age 46–47); Chicago, Illinois, U.S.
- Education: University of Texas at Austin (BFA)
- Alma mater: University of Wisconsin–Madison (MFA)
- Website: www.julieweitz.com

Julie Weitz (born 1979) is an American visual artist from Los Angeles.

== Background ==
Born in 1979 in Chicago, Illinois, Weitz was trained as a painter and taught painting at the University of South Florida for eight years. She began to experiment with video in 2010. Her recent work concerns the experience of the self in the modern world, where virtual and embodied experiences mingle. Besides digital editing tools, Weitz has used various physical materials to create videos, including paint, smoke, prefabricated sculpture, and the human body. She has also collaborated with musicians, including Paul Reller and Benjamin Wynn.

Weitz's interactive installation Touch Museum (Young Projects Gallery, 2015) garnered national attention, with features in Artforum, the Los Angeles Times, Gizmodo, and on radio station KCRW. The installation was explicitly designed to trigger physical sensations in the viewer using the methods of Autonomous sensory meridian response. Tactile stimuli (egg foam carpeting, velvet walls), auditory stimuli (whispered binaural readings from Henri Bergson), and visual stimuli (layered videos reflected in mirrors, colored smoke) combined to blur the boundaries between perception and reality creating a sense of "euphoric discombobulation".

Weitz has described her use of physical props and pigments in her videos as an "anti-CGI aesthetic" inspired by the 1970s Sci-Fi.

Weitz has had solo exhibitions at Young Projects (Los Angeles), Eastern Star Gallery (Los Angeles), Chimento Contemporary (Los Angeles, California), Cunthaus (Tampa, Florida), and The Suburban (Oak Park, Illinois).

In 2013, she moved to Los Angeles. Before her move, Weitz was a tenured professor at the University of South Florida.

As of 2018, she teaches in Los Angeles and is a regular author at Contemporary Art Review, Los Angeles.

== Exhibitions ==
Weitz has exhibited her work in numerous group and solo shows around the United States. Her recent exhibitions include:

- Femmebit, Human Resources, 2016;
- Touch Museum, Young Projects Gallery, Los Angeles, CA, 2015–2016;
- Julie Weitz: Here From Behind, Agency Gallery, Los Angeles, CA, 2014;
- Primordial Mirror, Ware:Wolf:Haus, Dallas, TX, 2014;
- Body, body, bodies…, SOMArts Cultural Center, 2014;
- Julie Weitz and Kamrooz Aram, The Suburban, Oak Park, IL, 2013;
- Return to Sender, Tempus Projects, 2011;
- Vertical Hold, Electric Works, 2011;
- About Face, Thomas Robertello Gallery, 2010;
- Salon No. 4, Works 092-140, Marine Art Salon, 2010
- Assembled, Patricia Sweetow Gallery, 2010;
- In Bed Together, Royal T, 2010;
- Play it Forward, Schroeder Romero/New York, 2009;
- Note To Self, Schroeder Romero/New York, 2009;
- Retractions, Root Division, 2009;
- Strangers, Privateer, 2008;
- Postcolonialism and After, University of South Florida, 2006.
