= John Butler (author) =

British spiritual author and YouTuber

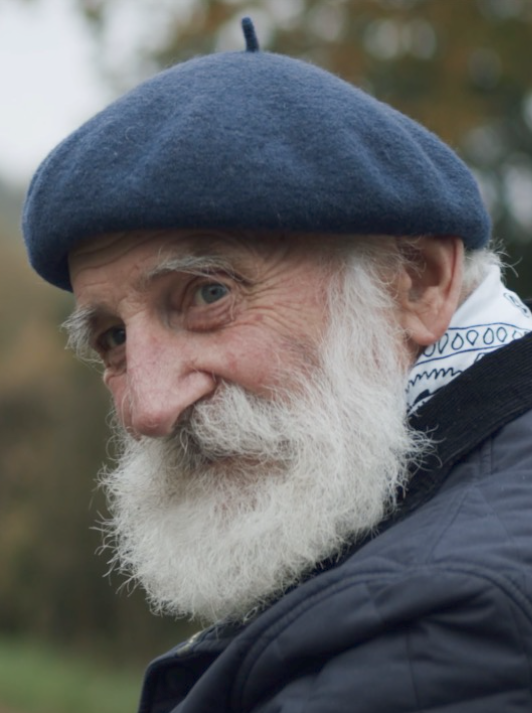
- Butler in 2021
- Born: 16 May 1937 (age 88); Hemel Hempstead, England
- Occupations: Organic farmer, author, YouTuber
- Website: https://spiritualunfoldment.co.uk/

John George Butler (born 16 May 1937) is a British author, YouTuber and retired farmer living in Derbyshire. A graduate of the University of Nottingham, Butler is known for having written several books describing his experiences with meditation and spirituality gained through international travel and study, and has accumulated over 200 thousand subscribers on his YouTube channel where he discusses a wide array of subjects that primarily centre around religion and introspection.

Butler's spiritual views are told in a Christian context and revolve around the importance of meditation and self-discovery. His soft-spoken voice has drawn fans of ASMR to his channel as well. A Conscious TV interview with Butler, uploaded in 2016 and covering his life story, received over twenty million views on YouTube; Butler began his YouTube channel after he was encouraged by its positive reception. Beyond authorship and videomaking, Butler also gained attention in the 1970s when he became one of the first farmers in the United Kingdom to promote organic farming. His organic practices are the subject of the 1975 BBC documentary Three Acres at Bicker Fen.

== Bibliography ==
- Wonders of Spiritual Unfoldment (2008)
- Mystic Approaches (2012)
- Mystic Beginnings (2020)
- Mystic Forbearance: In Russia, Part I (2020)
- Mystic Forbearance: In Russia, Part II (2020)
- Mystic Naturally: In Africa (2020)
- Mystic Verses Volume I: Destined to Joy (2020)
- Mystic Verses Volume II: Do you pray for me? (2020)
