= EXIT Theatre =

Theater in San Francisco, California

EXIT Theatre is an alternative theater located at 277 Taylor Street, San Francisco, California, in the downtown Tenderloin neighborhood, and at 890 G Street in Arcata California. The theater operates the two theaters and annually produces the San Francisco Fringe Festival in the City and the Short Play Festival in Arcata.

EXIT Theatre began in 1983 when the founder and artistic director Christina Augello directed a group of retired vaudevillians and method actors in two performances of a new play in the lobby of a San Francisco residential hotel.<

Early plays at EXIT Theatre include Sadie’s Turn (the first full-length play by noted Native American poet Mary TallMountain), Mystery of the Fourth Wall (the West Coast premiere in 1989 of Mary Zimmerman), and Like (the first full production of beat poet Diane di Prima’s 35-year-old sound play). More recently, EXIT Theatre showed plays such as Breaking Rules, Broken Hearts: Loving across Borders (the second solo show by tenure professor-turned-storyteller Ada Cheng) in January 2018.

Recent premieres by EXIT Theatre include Waiting for FEMA by Karen Ripley and Annie Larson, and Guns and Ammunition by Sarah McKereghan. Other new work included Mugwumpin's Nightgown Symphony, RIPE Theatre's Arrythmmica and resident playwright Sean Owens' Odd By Nature, selected “San Francisco’s Best Comic Playwright” by SF Weekly. EXIT Theatre toured Last of the Red Hot Dadas by Kerry Reid and Naught But Pirates by Sean Owens to New York City where EXIT Theatre co-founded the FRIGID New York festival. Notable productions by independent theaters at EXIT Theatre included the world premiere of Babylon Heights by Irvine Welsh (of Trainspotting fame) and Dean Cavanagh, a new authorized translation of No Exit by Jean-Paul Sartre, the premiere of One Big Lie by Liz Duffy Adams, and an incendiary Death of the Last Black Man in the Whole Entire World by Suzan-Lori Parks.

In 1992 EXIT Theatre founded the San Francisco Fringe Festival. The Fringe accepts applications from theater companies and then selects the companies in the festival through a random lottery, without censorship or curation.

In 2023 EXIT Theatre founded the Short Play Festival. Each year EXIT Theatre accepts submissions of short plays from local, national and international playwrights. A committee of Humboldt County theater artists reviews the plays and selects the plays that are presented in the festival with local actors, directors, and other theater artists.
