= Janice Tanaka =

Japanese-American media artist

Janice Tanaka is a Japanese-American media artist born in Hollywood, California^{[date?]} known for making experimental videos. Tanaka is best known for Memories from the Department of Amnesia, an experimental documentary about the death of her mother, and Who's Going to Pay for These Donuts Anyway?, which chronicles the life of her father, who was interned in camps during World War II.

Tanaka started her career as a ballet dancer before studying music composition and later obtaining an MFA. She taught at the University of California, Los Angeles (UCLA), the Columbia College Chicago, and California Institute of the Arts. Between 1994 and 1996, she was the CEO of Sonic Boom Inc.

== Early life ==
Tanaka received her Bachelor of Fine Arts degree in 1978 and Master of Fine Arts degree in 1981 from the Art Institute of Chicago. She began her artistic career as a dancer before shifting her focus to film and documentaries.

Tanaka's parents—Jack Koto Tanaka and Lily Tanaka—married prior to World War II. The family was interned at the Manzanar Japanese Internment Camp during World War II following the signing of Executive Order 9066. Her father protested the internment, and was arrested by the Federal Bureau of Investigation. After being diagnosed with schizophrenia, he was institutionalized. Lily divorced Jack during the war, and moved the family to a predominantly white neighborhood in Chicago.

== Career ==
Tanaka started her career as a ballet dancer with the Allegro American Ballet in 1955. In 1957 she performed with the Ballet Russe de Monte Carlo. From 1960 to 1961 she danced with the Jim Hetzer's Japanese Spectacular. She studied music composition at the Conservatorio International de Musica from 1961 to 1964.

After receiving her MFAdegree from the School of the Art Institute of Chicago, she taught at the University of California, Los Angeles (UCLA) in 1980. From 1982 to 1985 she was at the Columbia College Chicago. Between 1985 to 1989 she attended the University of Colorado Boulder. After spending 1990 to 1994 at UCLA, she briefly left academia to become CEO of Sonic Boom Inc. until 1996. Since 1996, she has held a faculty position at California Institute of the Arts.

Tanaka's videos have been described as "documentary in style, using a variety of techniques; some images are abstract, distorted, and blurred to an unrecognizable degree, while others are clear and informal, as if they could be a family snapshot."

== Select videography ==
Highlights from Tanaka's work:

- Swimming in Air, 2006, 28:10 minutes, color/B&W, English
- No Hop Sing, No Bruce Lee; What do you do when none of your heroes look like you?, 1998, 31:56 minutes, color/B&W, English
- Who's Going to Pay for These Donuts Anyway?, 1992, 58:30 minutes, color/B&W, English
- Memories From the Department of Amnesia, 1990, 12:50 minutes, color/B&W, English
- The Heisenberg Uncertainty Principle, 1989, 17:50 minutes, color/B&W, English
- Grass or When the Rain Falls on the Water Does The Fish Get Any Wetter?, 1985, 05:30 minutes, color, English
- Superhuman Flights of Submoronic Fancies, 1982, 11:00 minutes, color, English
- Ontogenesis, 1981, 05:30 minutes, color/B&W, English
- A True-Life Adventure in Beaver Valley, 1980, 05:30 minutes, color/B&W, English

== Permanent collections ==
Tanaka has pieces in the collections of many museums and libraries.

- Kröller-Müller Museum
- Carnegie Museum of Art
- The Getty
- The Japanese American National Museum California
- The Institute of Kino Engineers (St. Petersburg, Russia)
- National Library of Australia
- The New York Public Library
- The University of Southern California
- University of California Los Angeles
- New York University
- University of Chicago

== Awards ==
Tanaka has received many awards:

- The American Film Institute Media Award
- The National Endowment for the Arts Media Award
- The Corporation for Public Broadcasting and Public Broadcasting Systems Media Awards
- Rockefeller Foundation Media Fellowship (1991 and 2003)
