= Alice Miceli =

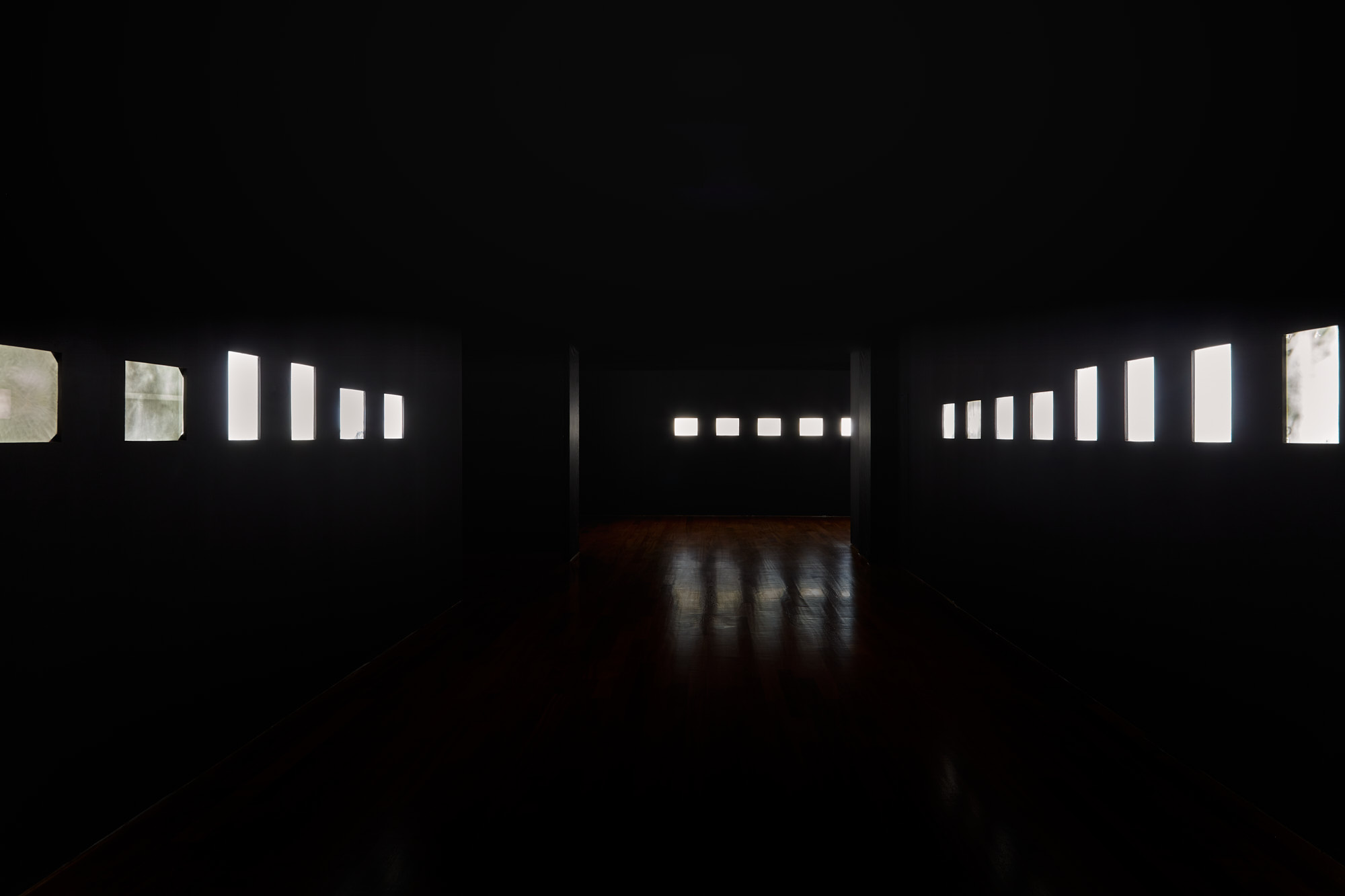
"Chernobyl Project" at the Americas Society, New York, 2019

Alice Miceli (born 1980) is a Brazilian artist. She lives and works in Rio de Janeiro and New York.

== Early life ==
She was born and raised in Rio de Janeiro, and studied film at the École supérieure d'études cinématographiques in Paris.

== Career ==
Her work has been featured in group and solo exhibitions in various countries. She has been represented by art galleries such as Galeria Nara Roesler.

Miceli participated in the 2009 Festival Internacional de Artes Electrónicas y Video TRANSITIO_MX in Mexico City. She presented at the 2010 São Paulo Art Biennial, the 2014 Japan Media Arts Festival in Tokyo and the 2016 Moscow International Biennale for Young Art. Her work was exhibited at transmediale festivals in Berlin, at the Sydney Film Festival in 2008 and the Images Festival in Toronto in 2008.

In 2016, Miceli was a fellow at the Jan van Eyck Academie in Maastricht; she was a fellow at the Dora Maar House in Ménerbes, and at Yaddo and the MacDowell Colony.

In 2019, her work Projeto Chernobyl was presented for the first time in its complete form in the US, at the Americas Society, in New York. For this work, Miceli developed a method of image making to document the enduring effects of the Chernobyl nuclear plant explosion of April 26, 1986. Gamma radiation continues to be present. It is invisible to the naked eye and to traditional methods of photography that have been used to document the aftermath. With Projeto Chernobyl, Miceli made this contamination visible via direct contact between the radiation and film, which was exposed in the Chernobyl Exclusion Zone for months at a time.

== Art ==
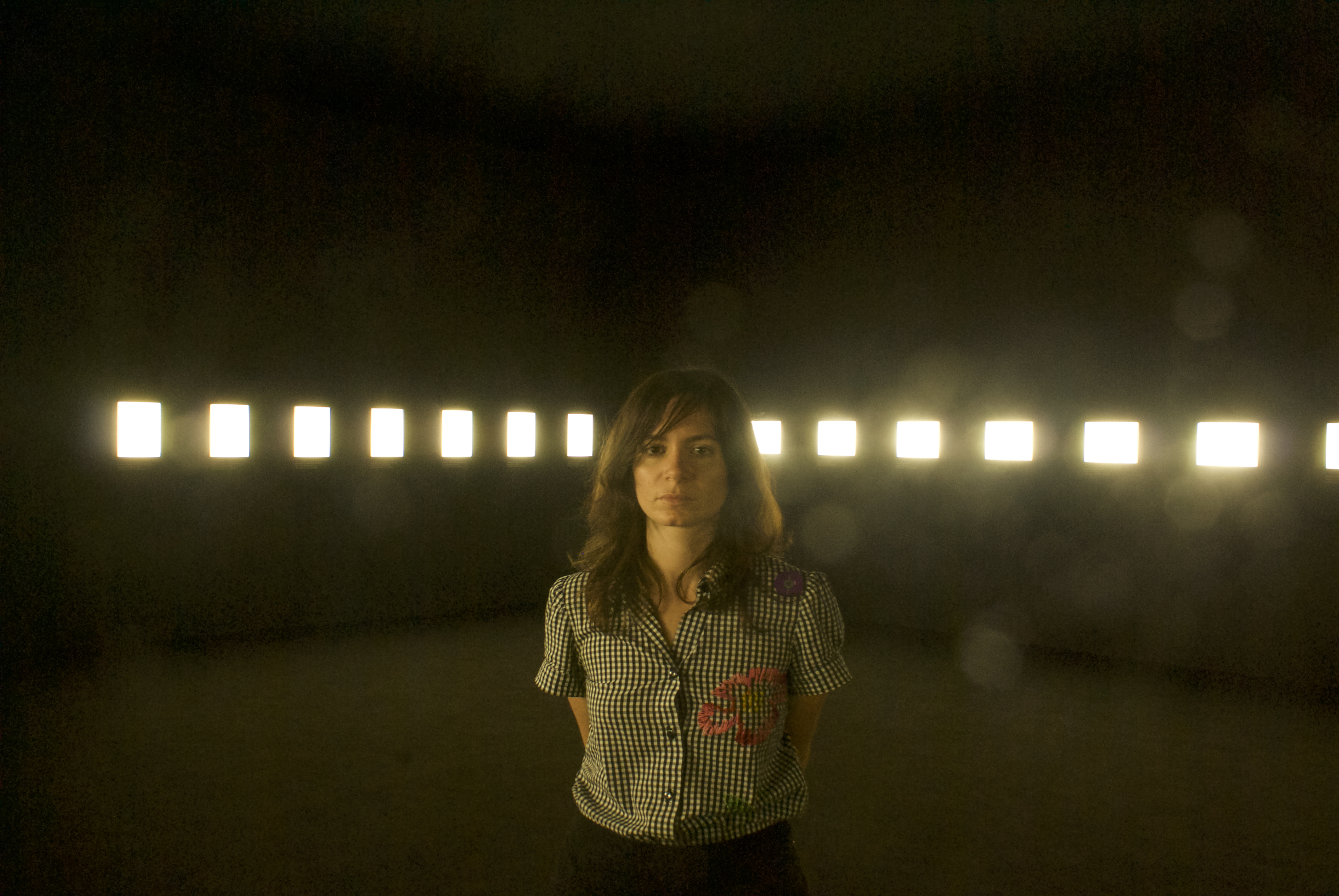
Alice Miceli

Miceli’s work "applies investigative travel and historical research to chart the virtual, physical and cultural manifestations of trauma inflicted on social and natural landscapes." She experiments with time-based media, notably camera and video to chart the effect of time in the context of societal and natural traumas. Her artwork has been described as haunting and beautiful, leaving audiences with feelings of reverence and introspection.

Her work has been praised by art critics and aficionados alike for its powerful emotional resonance and ability to convey complex histories and stories.

== Recognition ==
- PIPA Prize (2014)
- Cisneros Fontanals Grants & Commissions Award (2015)
