= Meredyth Sparks =

American artist

Meredyth Sparks (born 1972) is an American artist. She attended the University of Tennessee, Knoxville and Hunter College. Her work is included in the collections of the Albright–Knox Art Gallery, the Whitney Museum of American Art, the Philadelphia Museum of Art and the Musée d'art contemporain de Bordeaux.
