= Jen DeNike =

Jen DeNike is a contemporary artist who works with video, photography, installation and performance. She is a dual citizen of the USA and UK, born Norwalk, Connecticut.

The Kunst-Werke Institute for Contemporary Art held an exhibition of her work in 2006. In 2010, her piece "Twirl" involved a marching band passing through the Brooklyn Museum. In January 2010, "Scrying", "a non-narrative performance ballet conceived and directed by New York-based artist Jen DeNike" received its world premiere at the Museum of Modern Art (MOMA). MOMA also has two of her videos in its collection: Wrestling (2003) and Dunking (2004).

== Exhibitions ==
- "Rapture Rupture: Womxn in Collage, 16NST at Patricia Fleming Gallery, Glasgow Scotland, August 25 - September 23, 2023
- "The Pods", Central Fine, May 28 - June 29, 2023
- "Die Liebe Familie", DOCK 20 Kunstraum und Sammlung Hollenstein, Lustenau, Austria, March 1 - 31, 2023
- “JEN”. Central Fine, January 9 - February 16, 2022
- "Crystals in Art: Ancient to Today", Crystal Bridges Museum of American Art, October 12, 2019 - January 6, 2020
- "Generation Loss: 10 Year Julia Stoschek Collection", Düsseldorf, Germany, June 17, 2017 - September 9, 2018
- "Number Twelve: Hello Boys", Julia Stoschek Collection, Düsseldorf, Germany, February 13 - July 31, 2016
- "If She Hollers", Anat Ebgi, November 14 – December 19, 2015
- "The Gender Show", Eastman Kodak House, June 15 - October 13, 2013
- "The Scrying Trilogy", September 17 – October 23, 2010
- "Reflections on The Electric Mirror: New Feminist Video", Brooklyn Museum, May 1, 2009–January 10, 2010
- "Through A Glass Darkly", Redline Contemporary Art Center, 2008
- ""Into Me Out of Me", KW Institute for Contemporary Art, November 26, 2006 - March 7, 2007
- "Into Me Out of Me", MoMA PS1, Jun 25 – September 25, 2006
- "Greater NY", MoMA PS1, March 14 - September 26, 2005
- "Boys Behaving Badly", Houston Museum of Contemporary Art, June 25 - September 12, 2004
