= Fire Station No. 30 =

Fire Station No. 30, and variations such as Engine House No. 30, may refer to:

- Fire Station No. 30–Engine Company No. 30, in the South Los Angeles area of Los Angeles, California
- New York City Fire Museum, in FDNY Engine Company No. 30 (1904), Manhattan, New York City

== See also ==
- List of fire stations
