= Russell D. Ramsey Triangle =

Traffic median in Brooklyn, New York

Coordinates: 40.66312°N 73.96080°W

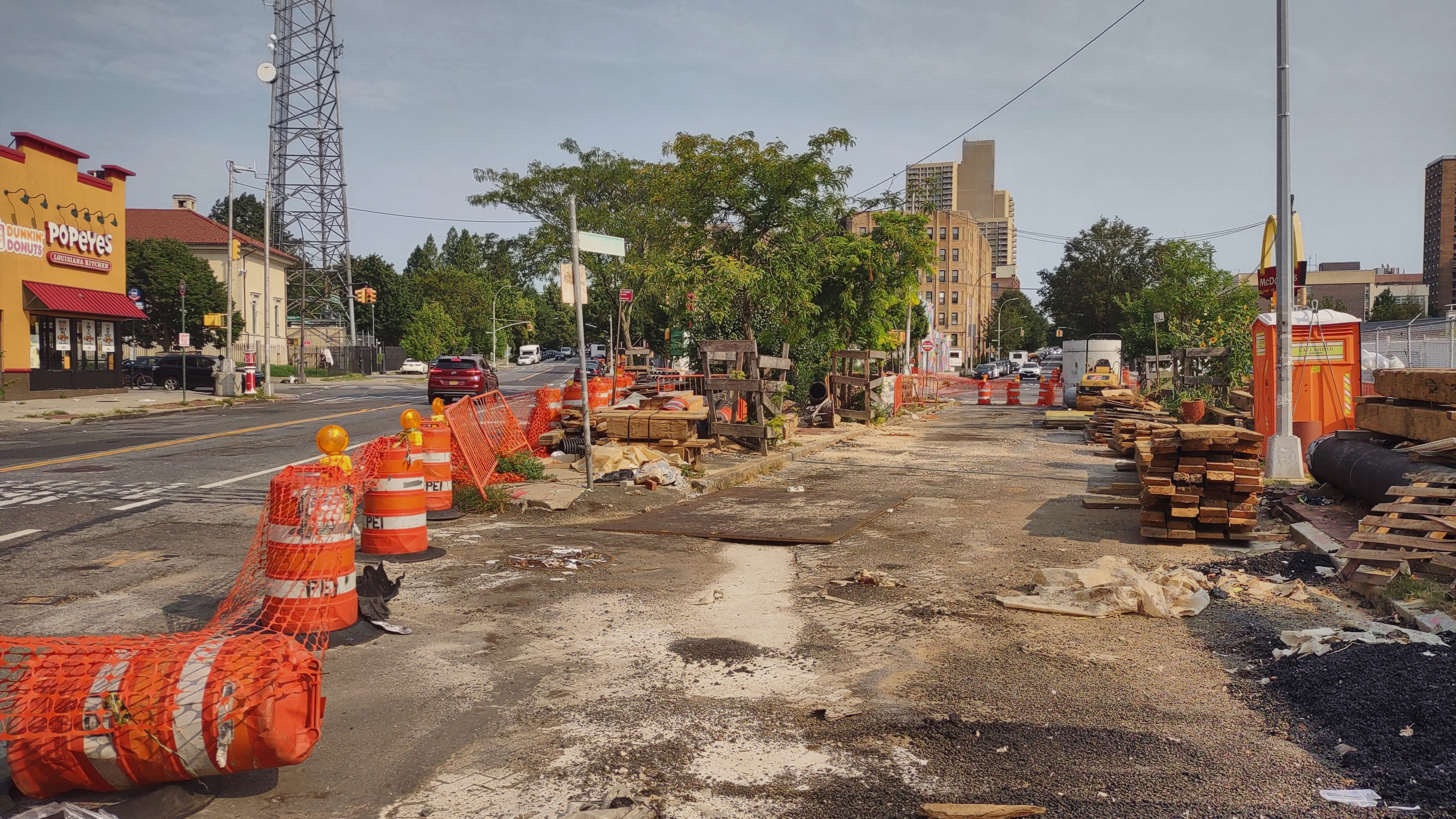
Russell D. Ramsey Triangle in 2021.

Russell D. Ramsey Triangle, a triangle-shaped traffic median in Brooklyn, New York City, memorializes an individual who devoted his life to the firefighting profession, working out of the nearby New York City Fire Department dispatch station at 35 Empire Boulevard for nearly a quarter-century. This triangle is bound by Empire Boulevard, Washington Avenue, and Franklin Avenue.

Russell D. Ramsey was born in Manhattan on March 18, 1929. He was the middle son of William Culbert and Edna Loretta Ramsey, who were both natives of Barbados. Ramsey's lifelong dream was to be a New York City firefighter. Barred from becoming this profession because of an eyesight deficiency, he entered the ranks of the New York City Fire Department in November 1956 as a Fire Alarm Dispatcher. On November 12, 1966, Ramsey became the first African American to be promoted to the rank of Chief Dispatcher in the New York City Fire Department. He was also considered the foremost expert on Brooklyn firehouse history and architecture, and served as a member of both the elite Historical Advisory Committee of the New York City Fire Museum and the Brooklyn Historical Society.

Russell D. Ramsey retired on March 31, 1990, and resided in Brooklyn until his death on September 29, 1992. The City Council designated this .07-acre location as the Russell D. Ramsey Memorial Triangle in 1998. The site was chosen because of its proximity to Ramsey's workplace. The triangle is bounded by Empire Boulevard, Washington Avenue and Franklin Avenue in the Prospect Lefferts Gardens neighborhood of Brooklyn.
