= Sarah McKenzie (artist) =

American painter

- Born: Greenwich, Connecticut, U.S.
- Education: 1998, MFA, The University of Michigan, Ann Arbor, MI; 1993, BA, Yale University, New Haven, CT
- Known for: Painting

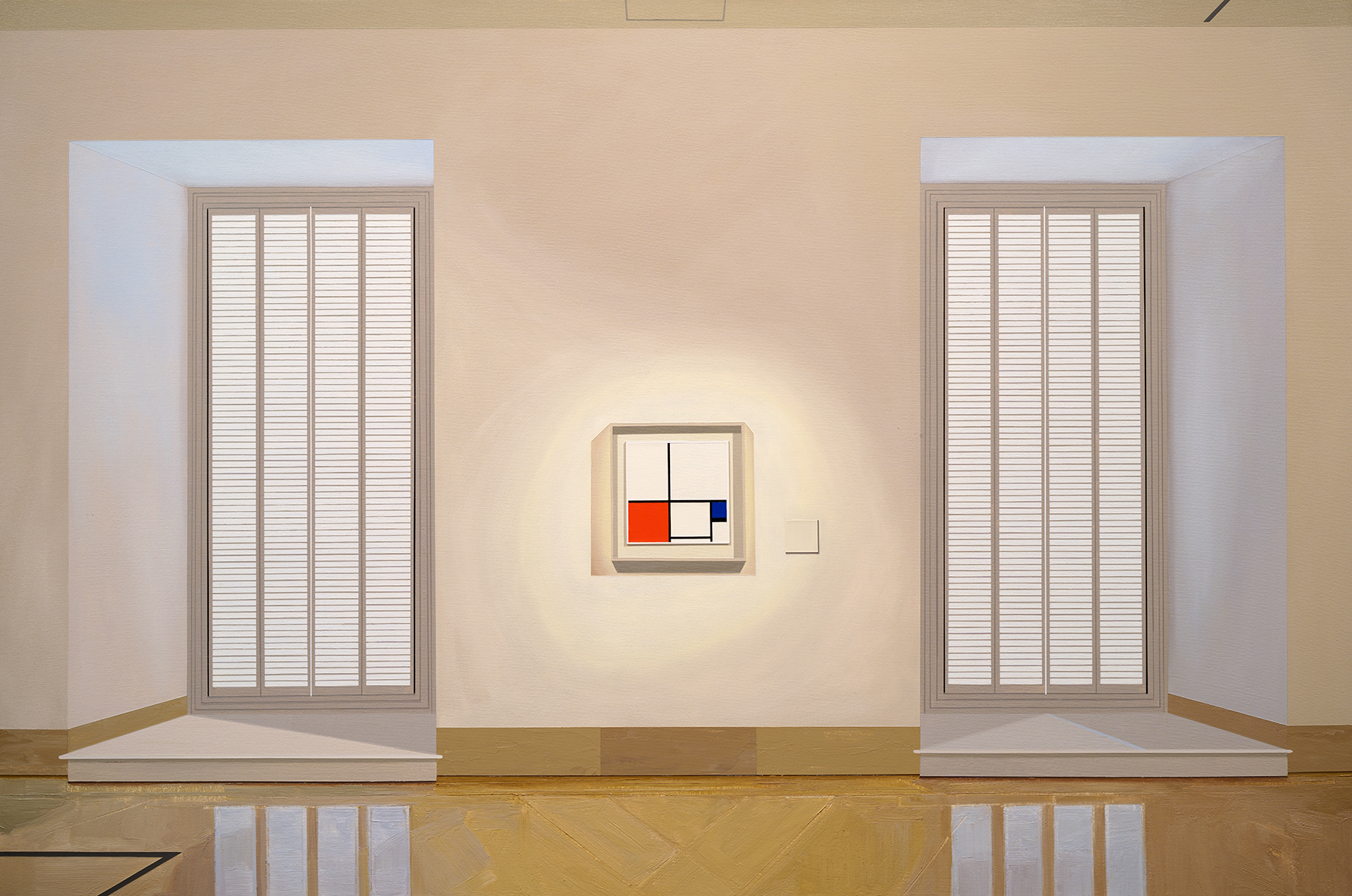
Equilibrium (Thyssen-Bornemisza Museum with Piet Mondrian, 2019), 2019, oil and acrylic on canvas, 36" x 54"

Sarah McKenzie (born 1971) is an American painter born in Greenwich, Connecticut. She has had numerous solo exhibitions, most notably with Denver's David B. Smith Gallery, New York's Jen Bekman Gallery, and the Indianapolis Museum of Contemporary Art. Her paintings have been included in group exhibitions at the Walker Art Center, the Carnegie Museum of Art, the Yale School of Architecture, the New Mexico Museum of Art, the Museum of Contemporary Art Denver, and the Aspen Art Museum.

McKenzie is the 2021 recipient of the Marion International Fellowship for the Visual and Performing Arts (Fredonia, NY) and a 2012 recipient of a Painters & Sculptors Grant from the Joan Mitchell Foundation (New York, NY). Other awards include the 10th Alexander Rutsch Award in Painting from the Pelham Art Center (Pelham, NY) in 2019; an Individual Artist Award from the Santo Foundation (St. Louis, MO) in 2019; and First Place in the National Young Painters Exhibition at Miami University (Oxford, OH) in 2006. Her paintings have been featured in Artforum, New American Paintings, Modern in Denver Magazine, the New York Times, Dwell Magazine, Art Ltd. Magazine, Art in America, and the 2014 book, Imagine Architecture: Artistic Visions of the Urban Realm, among other publications.

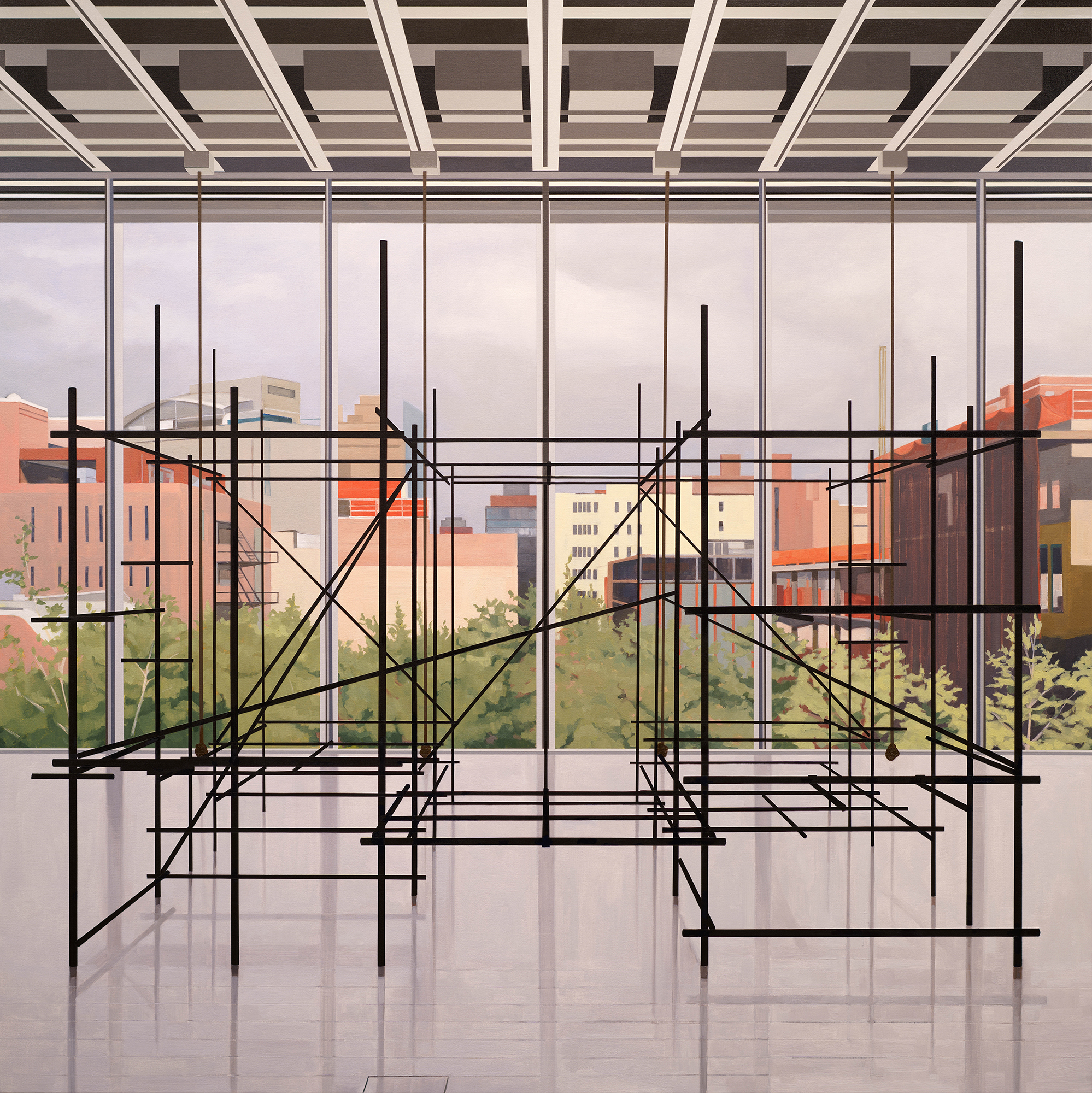
Cage (Whitney Museum with Brendan Fernandes, 2019), 2020, oil and acrylic on canvas, 60" x 60"

McKenzie paints with oil and acrylic on canvas. Her work captures architecture in transition. Past series have focused on construction sites, abandoned structures, hotel rooms, and parking garages– spaces that are fluid rather than fixed. With White Walls, the series of paintings McKenzie created from 2014 to 2020, she depicts the architecture of exhibition space: art fair tents, minimalist museum and gallery interiors, and video-screening rooms. Her work has been influenced by the writings of Brian O'Doherty, particularly his 1976 book, Inside the White Cube: The Ideology of the Gallery Space, which explores the history and development of gallery architecture in response to modern art. In 2021, with the support of the Marion Fellowship, McKenzie launched a new project exploring the architecture of the US prison system.
