= Spring Street (Manhattan) =

Street in Manhattan, New York

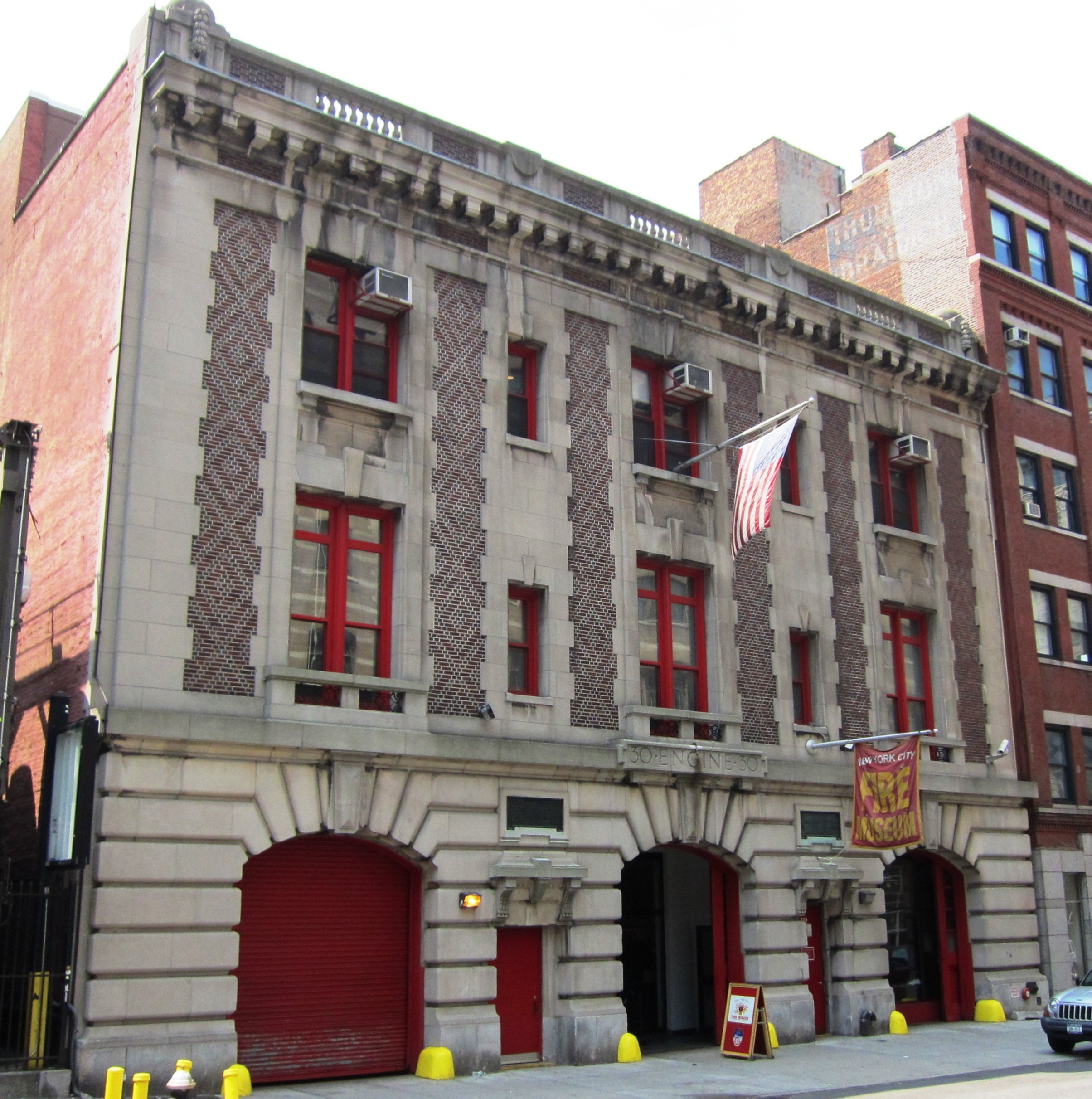
- New York City Fire Museum, a former firehouse, at 278 Spring Street
- Former name: Brannon Street
- Location: Hudson Square, SoHo, and Nolita (Manhattan, New York City)
- Postal code: 10012, 10013
- Coordinates: 40.724527°N 74.001982°W
- West end: West Street
- East end: Bowery
- North: Prince Street
- South: Kenmare Street

Spring Street is a street in Lower Manhattan, New York City, which runs west–east through the neighborhoods of Hudson Square, SoHo, and Nolita. It runs parallel to and between Dominick, Broome, and Kenmare Streets (to the south), and Vandam and Prince Streets (to the north). Address numbers ascend as Spring Street travels westward from the Bowery to West Street along the Hudson River.

As it passes through the center of SoHo, Spring Street is known for its artists' lofts, restaurants, and trendy and high-end boutiques, as well as its collection of cast-iron buildings.

== History ==
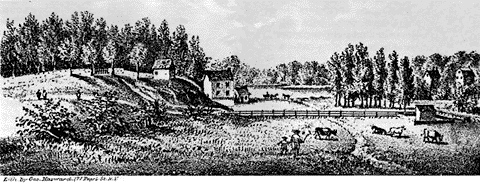
Lispenard's Meadow in 1785, viewed from what is now the northeast corner of Spring Street and Broadway

Aaron Burr's estate, Richmond Hill, was located in the area in the 1790s. Burr dammed Minetta Creek to create an ornamental pool by his estate's main gate, which was located near where Spring Street, MacDougal Street and Sixth Avenue come together.

In 1803, what would become Spring Street was the only street through the area, which was still rural, hilly and wooded. In May 1805, the street was ordered widened to 65 feet by the Common Council of the City of New York.

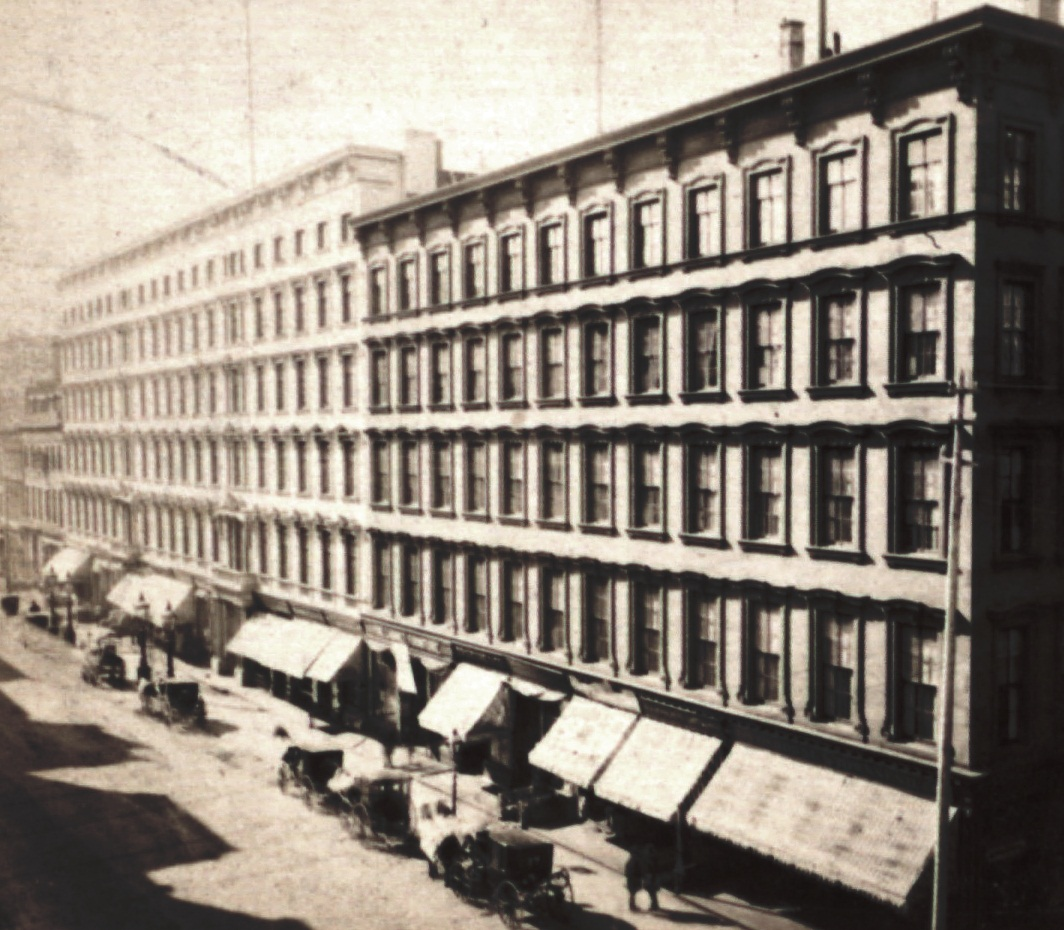
The St. Nicholas Hotel, no longer extant

The street was named Brannon Street until 1806, because it ran through the garden of a man by that name at what is now Spring Street and Hudson Street. Its current name comes from a fresh water spring which ran through Lispenard's Meadow, at the place where West Broadway is now. The stream continues to run underground, occasionally flooding basements.

In 1834, anti-black race rioters, primarily Irish immigrants, broke into the Spring Street Presbyterian Church, the home church of abolitionist Dr. Henry G. Ludlow. It was at the time located at 250 Spring Street between Varick Street and Sixth Avenue, where it had been established in 1811. The rioters caused extensive damage to the church's organ, pews and galleries. Two years after the riot, in 1836, a Gothic Revival structure was completed, replacing the old church. It stood on the site until the 1960s. In the early 20th century, the church served an impoverished community in which, according to the pastor, "Much of the neighborhood was lost in a kind of sodden apathy to which drunken quarrels brought release."

The corner of Spring Street and Broadway was the location of the St. Nicholas Hotel, a six-story, marble-faced, 600-room luxury establishment that was designed by either J. B. Snook or Griffith Thomas, and was completed in 1853. It was equipped with the newest technological conveniences, such as central heating, hot running water, and a telegraph office in the lobby. The interior of the hotel featured frescoes on the ceiling, gas light chandeliers and walnut wainscotting. The opulence of the hotel was such that one visitor described a stay there as "like an introduction to the palace of some Eastern prince." The building took up the full block between Spring and Broome Streets; only two small segments survive.

== Notable places ==
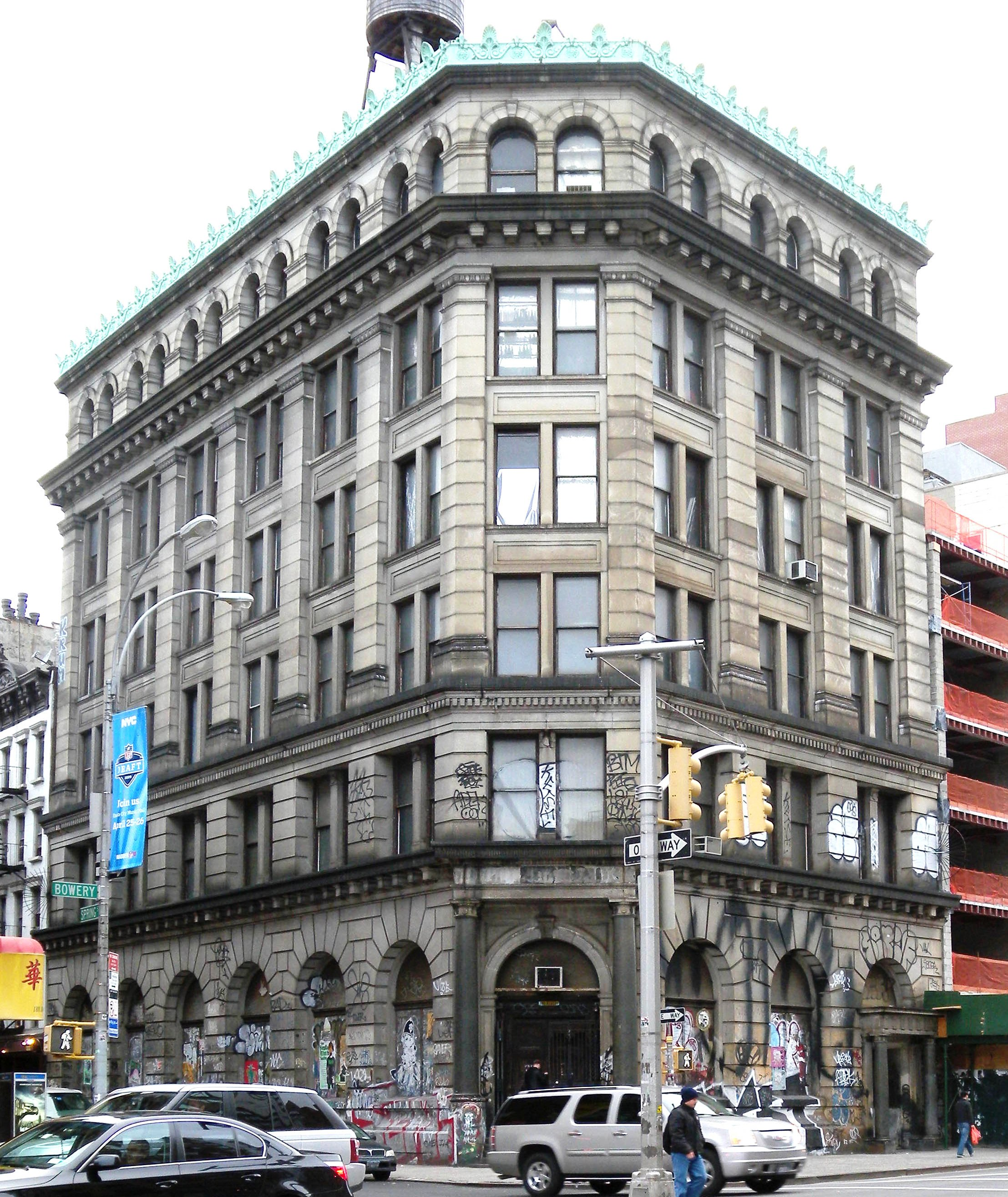
The Germania Bank Building

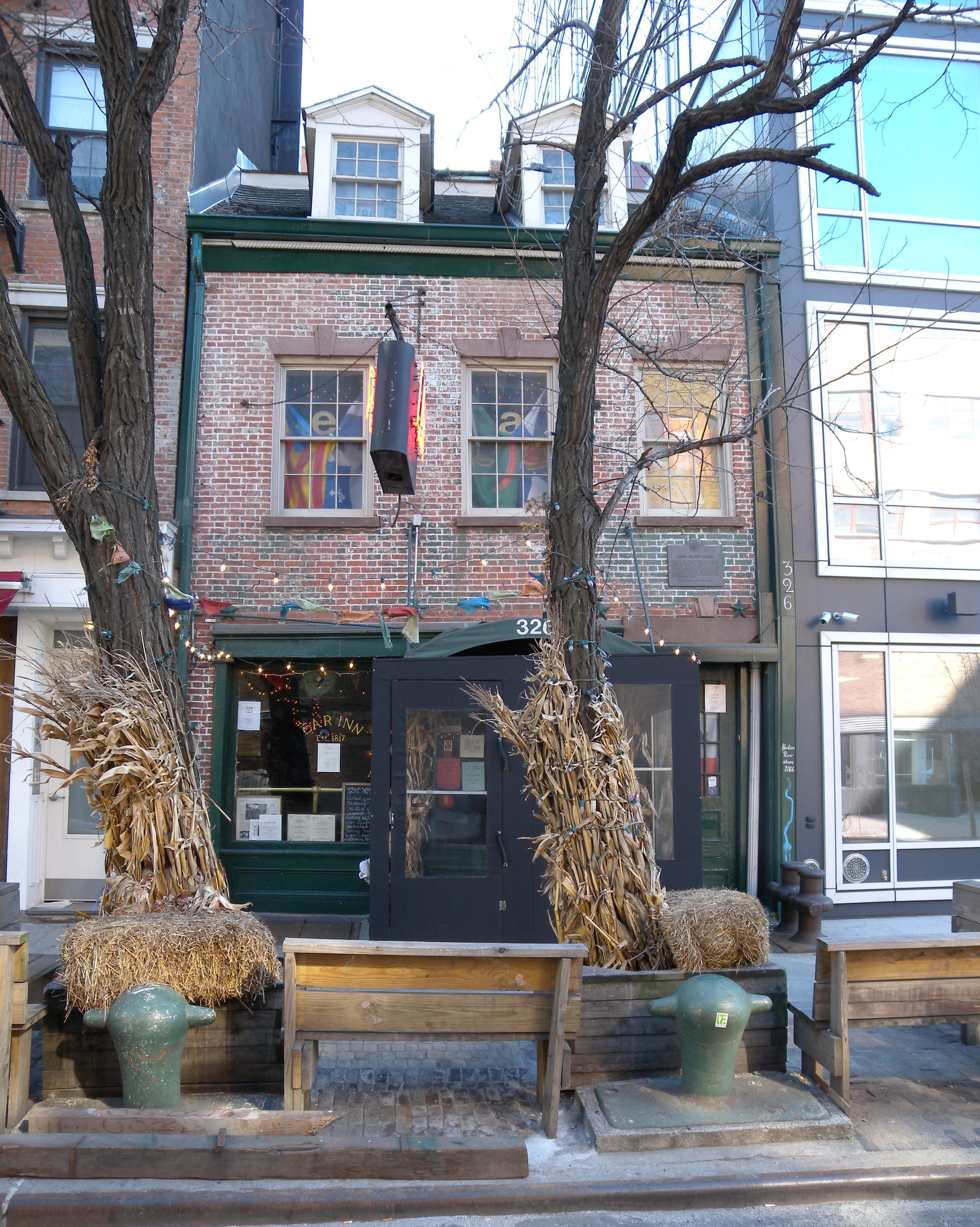
The James Brown House; to the right is the Urban Glass House

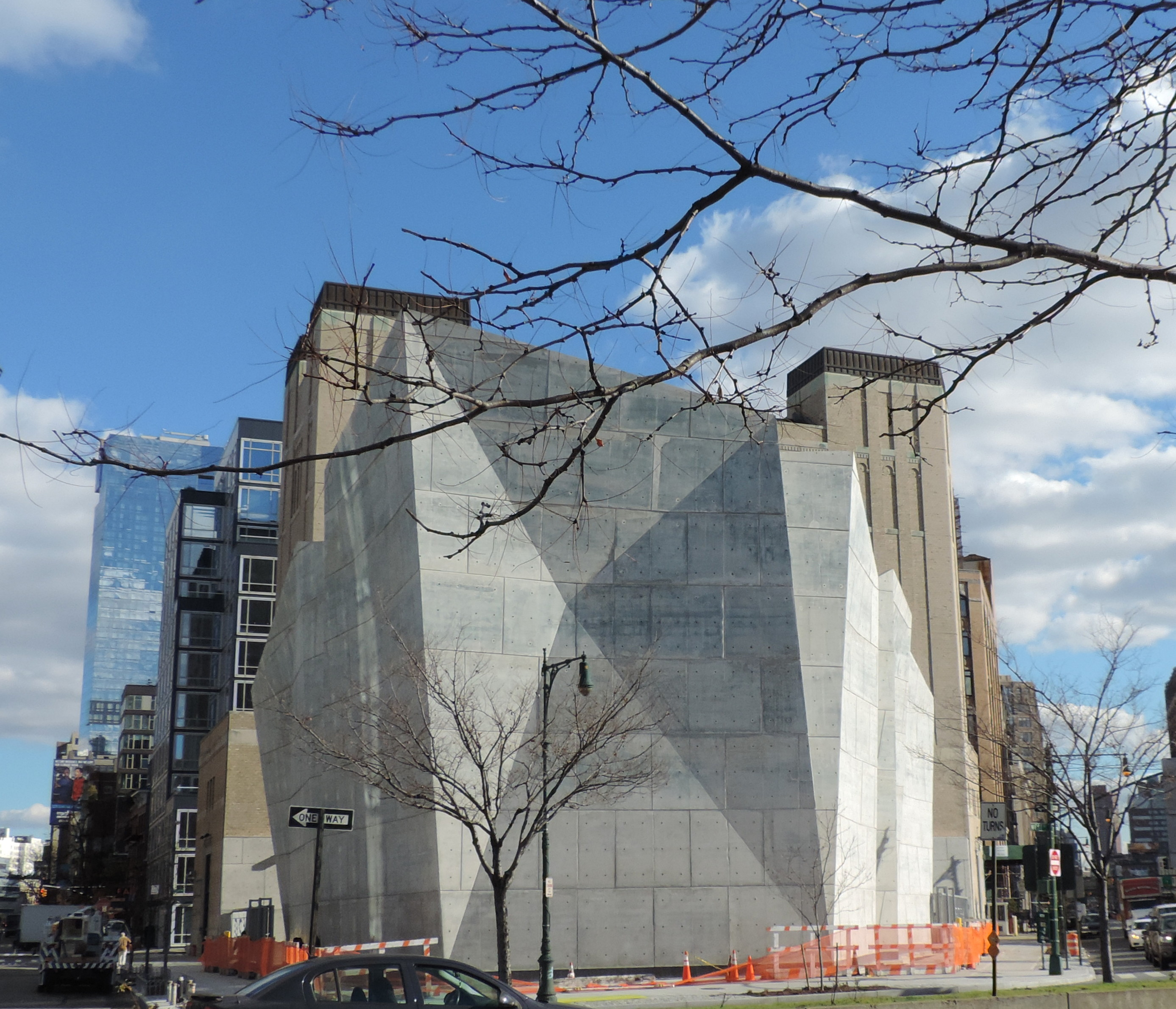
Spring Street salt shed at west end of street

- The Germania Bank Building, on the northwest corner of Spring Street and the Bowery (190 Bowery), a granite and limestone 1899 Renaissance Revival-style structure designed by Robert Maynicke, currently the 75-room residence, studio and gallery of commercial photographer Jay Maisel, who once rented space to Roy Lichtenstein.
- Jen Bekman Gallery, 6 Spring Street west of the Bowery, an art gallery.
- 11 Spring Street, a former stable and carriage house built in 1888, was once a noted magnet for graffiti artists, who covered the exterior of the building with their artwork. When the building was purchased for conversion into condominiums, the developers, in collaboration with the Wooster Collective, mounted a show inside the building, inviting well-known graffitists – many of whom had work on the outside – to cover the entire five floors of the building's interior. The show opened in December 2006 for a few days, before work on the conversion began and the artwork was covered over or destroyed. Prior to its days as a canvas for graffiti, the stable had been the home of IBM employee John Simpson for 30 years. Simpson had filled it with Rube Goldberg-like mechanisms, and put burnt candles, surplus from the 1964 New York World's Fair, in the windows, giving the building its nickname at the time, the "Candle Building".
- Lombardi's Pizza, 32 Spring Street, the first pizzeria in the United States. Zagats gave it a food rating of 25 in 2013. Originally located at 53 1/2 Spring Street in 1897, Gennaro Lombardi converted his grocery store into a pizzeria in 1905, and had a loyal clientele, including Italian tenor Enrico Caruso. Gennaro later passed the restaurant to his son George. It was closed in 1984, and re-opened a few years later down the block, run by one of Gennaro's grandsons.
- DeSalvio Playground, on the corner of Spring Street and Mulberry Street, named after John DeSalvio and his son Louis. The elder DeSalvio was an influential man in Little Italy, and his son was elected to the New York State Assembly.
- Taïm, 45 Spring Street, Israeli vegetarian restaurant. Zagats gave it a food rating of 26 in 2013, and ranked it the # 1 Israeli restaurant in New York City, and the # 2 restaurant in NoLita.
- The East River Savings Bank Building (now known as "The Spring"), 60 Spring Street, was built in 1927 and was designed by notable architect Cass Gilbert in the Beaux-Arts style. It was converted into a condominium apartment building in 2003.
- Balthazar, 80 Spring Street, French brasserie restaurant. Zagats gave it a food rating of 24 in 2013, and ranked it the No. 2 brasserie in New York City.
- MoMA Design Store, 81 Spring Street (at the corner of Crosby Street).
- The Donald Judd House and Museum, 101 Spring Street, a five-story cast-iron building, designed in 1870, which was the former residence and studio of artist Donald Judd. The building has been called an "outstanding example" of cast-iron architecture.
- 175 Spring Street, a lumber company, originally built as an electrical substation for the Sixth Avenue Elevated train line, run by the Metropolitan Railway Company. The building was constructed c. 1885, and features a granite Romanesque Revival arch.
- Vesuvio Playground, on the corner of Spring Street and Thompson Street; a neighborhood park.
- Numero 28 Pizzeria Romana, 196 Spring Street, Italian restaurant. Zagats gave it a food rating of 24 in 2013.
- Aquagrill, 210 Spring Street, seafood restaurant, Zagats gave it a food rating of 27 in 2013.
- Trump SoHo, 246 Spring Street, $450 million, 46-story hotel condominium.
- New York City Fire Museum, 278 Spring Street (between Varick Street and Hudson Street). Retired 1904 Beaux-Arts specialized firehouse has over 10,000 artifacts relating to the history of firefighting and the New York City Fire Department.
- Dennison and Lydia Wood House, 310 Spring Street, landmark designated by the New York City Landmarks Preservation Commission.
- James Brown House, 326 Spring Street, an historic building completed in 1817, and a New York City landmark, listed as well on the National Register of Historic Places. It is one of the few existing examples of Federal architecture in the neighborhood. The New York City Landmarks Preservation Commission called it "a modest survivor of one of those charming, comfortable, small early nineteenth century houses, once abundant in [New York] City." On the building's ground floor is The Ear Inn, one of the oldest taverns in New York City.
- The Urban Glass House, 330 Spring Street (between Washington and Greenwich Streets), a 12-story luxury condominium designed by noted architect Philip Johnson in the Modernist style; the interiors are by Annabelle Selldorf, another noted architect. The building was the last designed by Johnson before his death. The building utilized air rights from the James Brown House (see below), and in return the developers paid for significant repairs and improvements to that landmark. The building was constructed from 2005–2006.
- The Salt Shed, 336 Spring Street, designed by Dattner Architects and WXY Architecture and erected in 2015.

=== Transportation ===
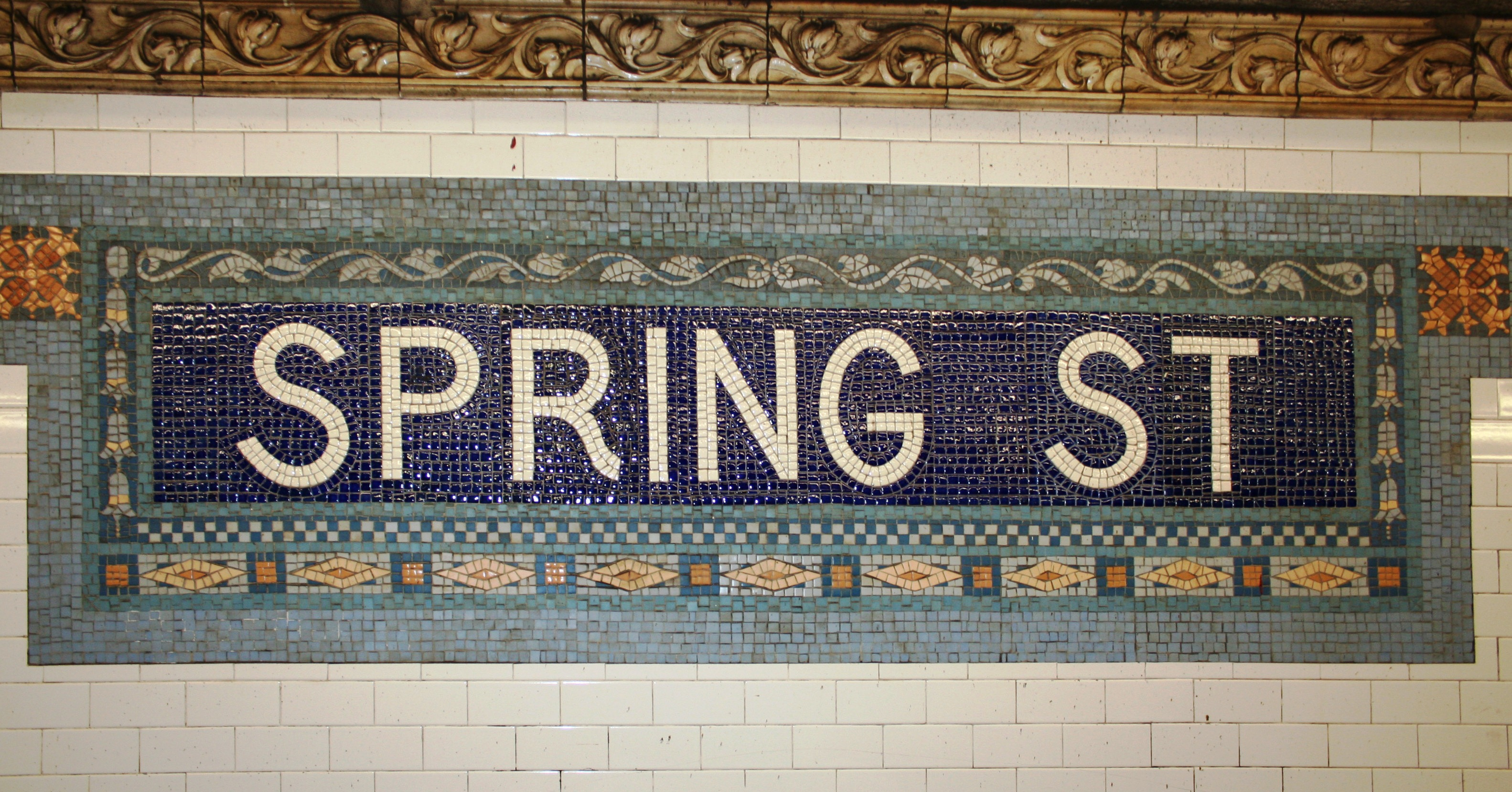
Spring Street Station mosaic

There are two subway stations located on Spring Street:

- Spring Street, a local station on the IRT Lexington Avenue Line of the New York City Subway, located at the intersection of Spring and Lafayette Streets, served by the 4, 6, and <6> trains.
- Spring Street, a local station on the IND Eighth Avenue Line of the New York City Subway, located at Spring Street and Sixth Avenue in the Hudson Square neighborhood, served by the A, C, and E trains.

One bus route, the M21, serves Spring Street in the eastbound direction from Washington Street to 6th Avenue, beginning service at Greenwich Street. Westbound buses run on West Houston Street.

== Notable residents ==
- Willy Eisenhart, writer on art.
- Donald Judd, artist, lived and worked at 101 Spring Street
- Jonathan Larson (1960–96), composer and playwright (Rent and tick, tick... BOOM!), winner of a posthumous Pulitzer Prize for Drama and three posthumous Tony Awards.
- Leah McSweeney (born 1982), founder and CEO of the female "Married to the MOB" (MTTM) clothing line.
- Nicholas Ray, film director, lived and worked in a loft at 167 Spring Street, from November 1976 to his death in June 1979. It was a location for Lightning Over Water (1980), his collaboration with Wim Wenders.
- Andrew Wyatt, musician and producer, lives on Spring Street.

== In popular culture ==
There were two songs written about Spring Street:

- "Spring Street" (2000), song by pop folk singer-songwriter Dar Williams
- "Spring Street" (2007), song by singer-songwriter Vanessa Carlton
