= Paul M. Viggiano =

American politician (born 1943)

Member of the New York State Assembly from the 62nd district
- In office March 1979 – December 31, 1982
- Preceded by: Louis DeSalvio
- Succeeded by: Sheldon Silver

Personal details
- Born: February 17, 1943 (age 83) New York City, New York, U.S.
- Party: Democratic

Paul M. Viggiano (born February 17, 1943) is an American politician who served in the New York State Assembly from the 62nd district from 1979 to 1982.
