= DeSalvio Playground =

Public park in Manhattan, New York

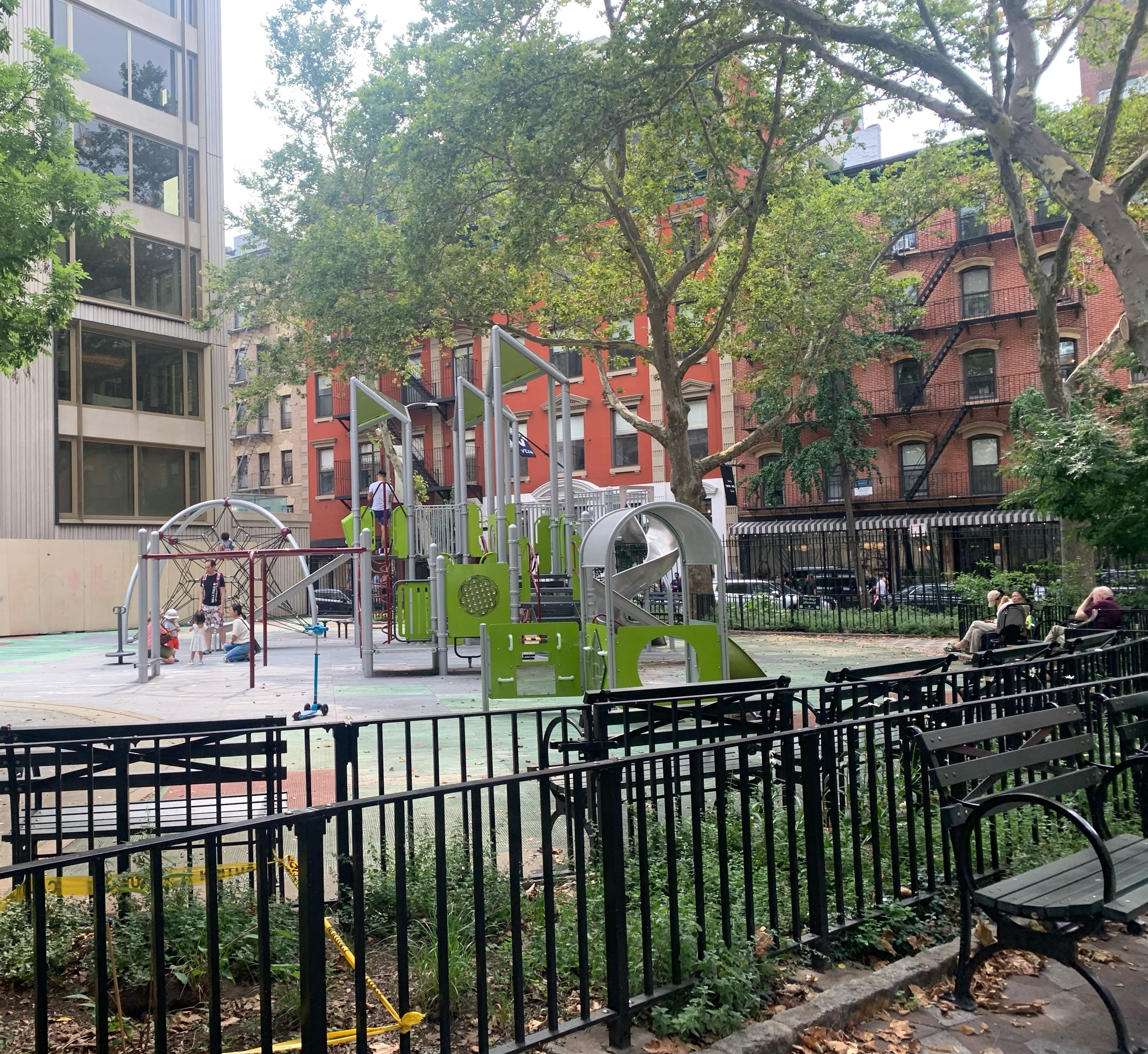
- Image of Desalvio Playground in July 2023
- Interactive map of DeSalvio Playground
- Location: on the corner of Spring Street and Mulberry Street in NoLita, Manhattan, New York
- Coordinates: 40°43′18″N 73°59′46″W

DeSalvio Playground is a neighborhood park located on the corner of Spring Street and Mulberry Street in NoLita, in Manhattan, New York City.

The playground has modular play equipment that is red, white, and green (in honor of the Italian flag), built-in stone chess tables, a basketball half-court, and benches.

== History ==
The park honors John DeSalvio (1881–1948) and his son Louis DeSalvio (1910–2004). John DeSalvio, a first-generation American, served as district leader of the Second Assembly District (West), and was one of a few Italian-Americans in the Tammany Hall political organization. Louis DeSalvio served as Second District New York State Assemblyman. The Government of New York City acquired the property in 1954 and turned it over to the Parks department. The playground opened on December 15, 1955 as "John DeSalvio Park".

The playground hosted the Citywide Bocce Ball Championships in 1996 and 1997.
