= James Brown House (Manhattan) =

Historic house in Manhattan, New York

- U.S. National Register of Historic Places
- New York City Landmark
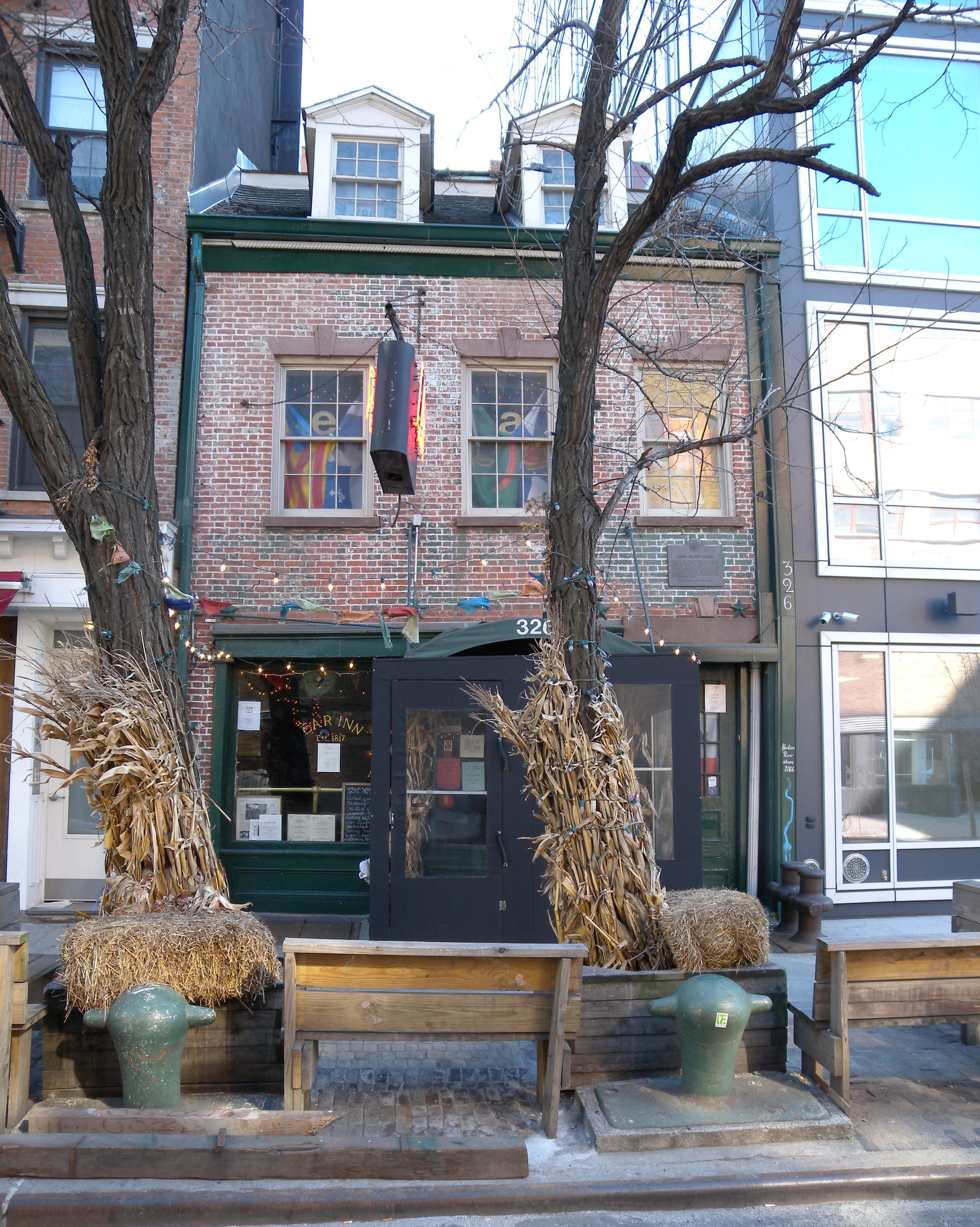
- (2009)
- Location: 326 Spring Street, Manhattan, New York City
- Coordinates: 40°43′33″N 74°00′35″W
- Built: 1817
- Architectural style: Federal
- NRHP reference No.: 83001717
- NYCL No.: 0568

Significant dates
- Added to NRHP: August 11, 1983
- Designated NYCL: November 19, 1969

The James Brown House is a historic building in the Hudson Square neighborhood of Manhattan in New York City. It was built in the late 18th century. Today, it is listed in the National Register of Historic Places and is a New York City designated landmark. It is one of the few existing examples of Federal architecture in New York. Its ground level is the site of The Ear Inn, one of the oldest existing taverns in New York City.

== History ==
The first record in New York City of the two-and-a-half-story Flemish bond brick house which features a gambrel roof and dormers was in 1817, the year Greenwich Village was formally incorporated into New York City. The building was originally the home of James Brown, an African-American Revolutionary War veteran, who was the proprietor of a tobacco store on the ground floor of the house. At the time of the building's construction, the house was only several feet from the shoreline of the Hudson River, although subsequent urban development has since filled in land that has increased the distance to the shore.

Brown sold the building to two apothecaries in the mid-19th century, Records show that a tavern occupied the shop from at least 1835; it was likely a bar even earlier than that, making it one of the oldest taverns in New York City. The house was purchased in 1890 by an Irish immigrant named Thomas Cloke, who ran a tavern and sold beer and spirits to sailors and longshoremen. The tavern had a brewery that was later turned into a restaurant. Cloke was reported to be a successful businessman and was well regarded in the community.

Cloke sold the business in 1919 in anticipation of the Eighteenth Amendment to the United States Constitution, which prohibited the sale of alcohol. During Prohibition, the restaurant became a speakeasy, while the upstairs floors were variously a boarding house, a headquarters for smugglers, and a brothel.

After Prohibition, the bar re-opened, but now existed as a business without a name. It was simply called "The Green Door", and catered to a clientele of waterfront workers, almost all of whom were hard-drinking regulars. The area declined sharply during the mid-20th century, as urban decay turned the once-bustling area into a nearly abandoned district.

In 1969, the New York City Landmarks Preservation Commission (LPC) designated the building as a landmark.

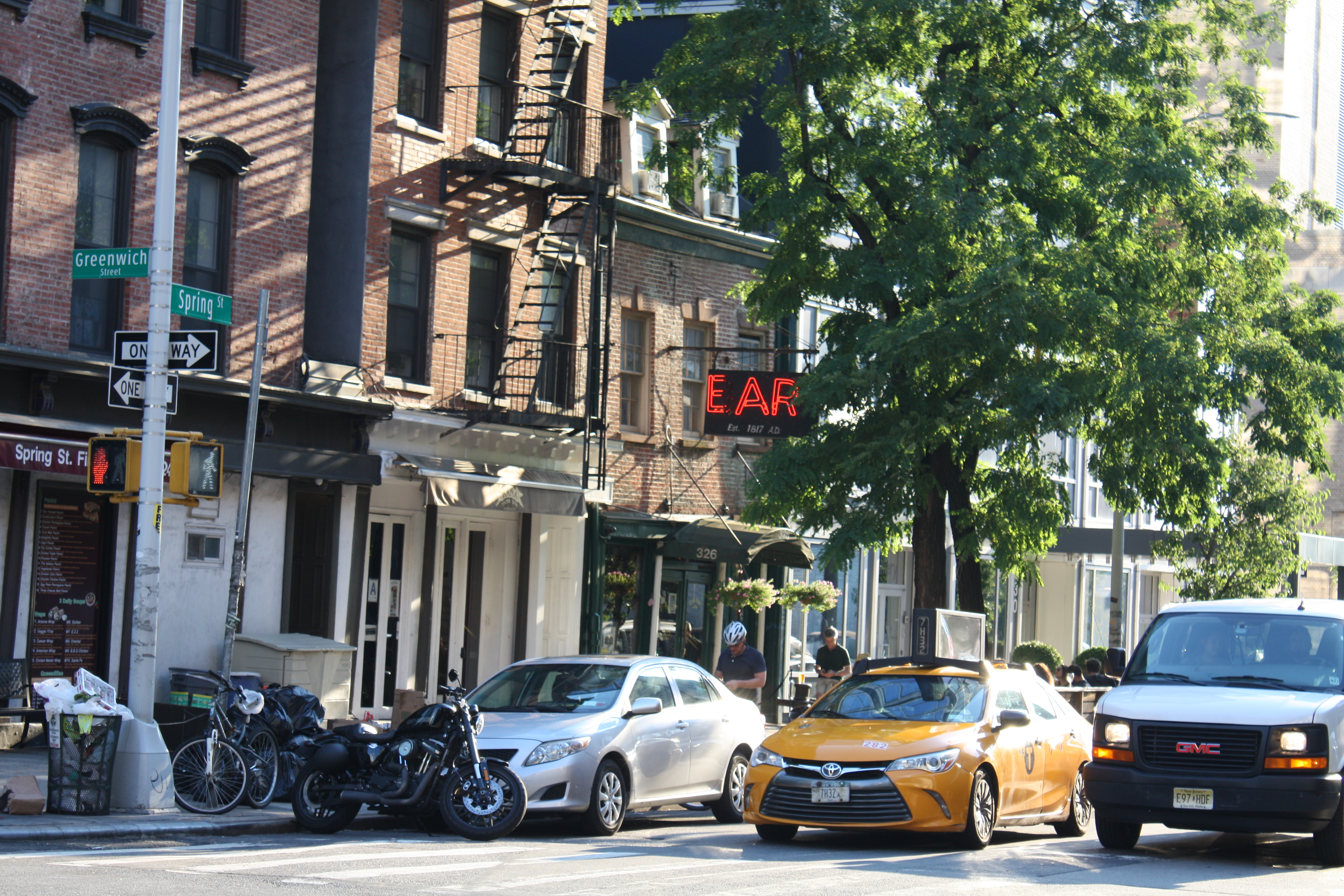
The building, with distinctive sign visible

In the mid-1970s, a group of artists including Sari Dienes and Rip Hayman purchased the lease, and in 1977, they re-opened the bar. To avoid having to request LPC approval for a new sign, the new proprietor Rip Hayman painted out part of the letter B in the "Bar" sign, turning it into the word "Ear", after The Ear, a music magazine they published upstairs. The Ear Inn became well known among the literary community.

== Today ==
Today, the James Brown House remains largely unchanged from its past appearance, even as urban renewal has transformed the area around it. Indeed, as part of the permitting process, real-estate developers have paid for thousands of dollars in repairs and improvements to the building, including a backyard fire escape. The Ear Inn continues to thrive as a bar and restaurant, under the proprietorship of Martin Sheridan; the building is still owned by composer and maritime lecturer Rip Hayman, and features memorabilia from its past.

== See also ==
- List of New York City Designated Landmarks in Manhattan below 14th Street
- National Register of Historic Places listings in Manhattan below 14th Street
