= Taïm =

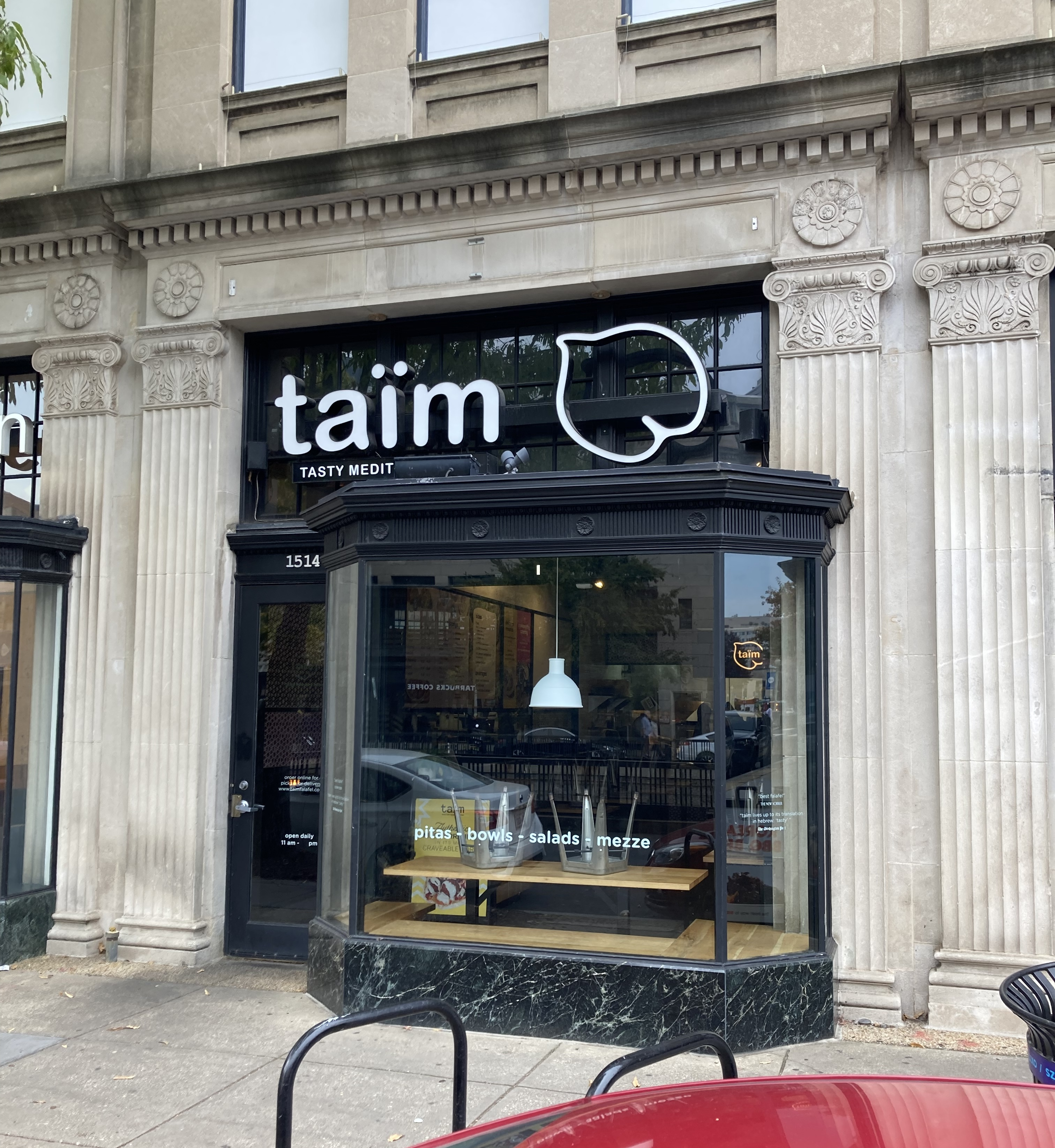
- Taïm's Dupont Circle location in Washington, D.C.
- Interactive map of Taïm

Restaurant information
- Established: 2012 (Spring Street location); 2005 (original location)
- Owner: Untamed Brands
- Food type: Mediterranean fast casual, shawarma, falafel, hummus, etc
- Location: 45 Spring Street (on the corner of Mulberry Street), in NoLita in Manhattan, New York City, New York, New York, 10012, United States
- Seating capacity: 17
- Reservations: Not accepted
- Other locations: Manhattan, Brooklyn, New Jersey, Washington, D.C.
- Website: www.taimkitchen.com

Taïm is a Mediterranean fast casual restaurant chain. Its oldest location is at 45 Spring Street (on the corner of Mulberry Street), in NoLita in Manhattan, New York City.

The Spring Street location opened in October 2012. Another location is at 222 Waverly Place (near Perry Street), in the West Village since 2005. There are now 13 other restaurant locations, including 3 restaurants in the Washington, D.C., area, 2 restaurants in New Jersey, as well as 2 locations in Brooklyn.

== Menu ==
Zagat's reported that Taïm had 'sublime' falafel (deep-fried chickpea balls), rated "'best in NYC' – and maybe 'the USA'". The falafel comes in several flavors, such as green (parsley and cilantro), red (roasted red peppers), and spicy. Home-made harissa spices it up.

The menu also includes homemade French fries to be dipped in saffron aioli, salad with lemon-mint dressing, and hot toasted pita brushed with olive oil and a mixture of sesame, salt, and the Israeli herb za'atar (grown on a mountain near Jerusalem).

== Decor ==
The original restaurant was small. Its decor was described by Zagats as "almost 'literally a hole-in-the-wall'".

== Reviews ==
In 2012, Time Out described Taïm's falafel as "wildly popular."

In 2013, Zagat's gave Taïm a food rating of 26, and a decor rating of 10, and ranked it the # 1 Israeli restaurant in New York City and the # 2 restaurant in NoLita. The same year, Fodor's described its food as "delicious."

== See also ==
- List of restaurants in New York City
- List of vegetarian and vegan restaurants (some locations)
