= Louis DeSalvio =

American politician

Member of the New York State Assembly
- In office January 1, 1941 – January 9, 1979
- Preceded by: Louis J. Capozzoli
- Succeeded by: Paul M. Viggiano
- Constituency: Manhattan's 2nd district (1941-1965); 66th district (1966); 60th district (1967-1972); 62nd district (1973-1979)

Personal details
- Born: May 29, 1910 New York City, New York, U.S.
- Died: August 17, 2004 (aged 94)
- Party: Democratic

Louis F. DeSalvio (May 29, 1910 – August 17, 2004) served in the New York State Assembly for over 38 continuous years, longer than all but one other member in the history of that body. From 1941 to 1979, he represented districts that included the southern end of Manhattan (including the Lower East Side), Liberty Island, Ellis Island, Governors Island, and (after 1972) the eastern edge of Staten Island. From 1975 to 1978, he served as the Assembly's speaker pro tempore. In that capacity, he often presided over the body.

== Personal background ==
DeSalvio was born in New York City, the son of district leader John DeSalvio, who also boxed under the name "the Legendary Jimmy Kelly." He attended the city's public schools and graduated from DeWitt Clinton High School. He married the former Elvira Mongillo, with whom he had two children, John and Maria. He was employed as a deputy collector for the U.S. Internal Revenue Service. In 1939 DeSalvio lost a race for an at-large seat to represent Manhattan on the New York City Council.

== State Assembly ==
=== Elections ===
First elected to the New York State Assembly in November 1940 to represent New York City's 2nd District, he represented that district from 1941 to 1966, sitting in the 163rd, 164th, 165th, 166th, 167th, 168th, 169th, 170th, 171st, 172nd, 173rd, 174th and 175th New York State Legislatures.

After redistricting was forced by the U.S. Supreme Court's "one man, one vote" decision in Reynolds v. Sims, 377 U.S. 533 (1964), he represented the 66th District in the 176th New York State Legislature in 1966 while chairing a legislative committee responsible for developing a final district map. The map proposed by his own committee separated his home address from most of his district, leading him to declare that the new plan would ruin his chances unless he moved. DeSalvio moved later that year, and represented the 60th District in the 177th, 178th and 179th New York State Legislatures from 1967 to 1972.

Redistricting in 1972 combined most of the old 60th district with part of Staten Island to form the new 62nd District. Those changes caused Democratic and Republican-Conservative strategists to doubt DeSalvio's chances of re-election. Nevertheless, he was re-elected that year and three more times, representing the 62nd District in the 180th, 181st, 182nd and 183rd New York State Legislatures from 1973 to 1979.

His closest race was for renomination in 1970, when he won a three-way primary with 80 more votes than his nearest challenger, Republican Hyman Dechter. While he consistently ran as a Democrat, he received the endorsement of the State's Conservative Party at least once (in 1974). DeSalvio resigned a few days into his last term, on January 9, 1979, to take a job with the State Insurance Fund.

On January 10, 2009, New York Assemblyman Richard Gottfried, who had been elected in 1970 to a term beginning in January 1971, broke DeSalvio's record for continuous service. Gottfried continues to serve.

=== Issues ===
DeSalvio was instrumental in two preservation battles with New York redevelopment czar Robert Moses. In 1949, he teamed with State Senator Elmer F. Quinn to draft a bill, known as the DeSalvio-Quinn Bill, to convey Castle Clinton (at the southern end of Manhattan) to the federal government, in order to frustrate Moses' plans to demolish it. President Harry Truman had designated Castle Clinton as a national monument in 1946, but that designation could not actually protect the property until it was owned by the federal government. Both houses of the state legislature passed the DeSalvio-Quinn Bill and in April 1949 Governor Thomas Dewey signed it, thus securing the protection of the site.

In the 1960s, DeSalvio became instrumental in defeating construction of the proposed Lower Manhattan Expressway. Moses was the Expressway's chief proponent. DeSalvio made a famous speech at a hearing before the New York City Board of Estimate in which he characterized Moses as a "'stubborn old man" and the proposed expressway as "a mad visionary's dream." Paradoxically, DeSalvio introduced bills in 1962 and 1963 to purchase Ellis Island from the federal government and use it as the site of a new state university campus and as a hospital and research center for narcotics addicts. Neither bill became law.

In 1966, DeSalvio criticized the State's plan to construct the World Trade Center, complaining that the twin towers would be unnecessary, except perhaps for use by NASA as part of a slingshot to launch astronauts toward the moon.

Sports Illustrated mocked him in 1963 for proposing what it described as a "weird suggestion," that state-operated horse tracks allow betting not only on races at that track, but also races at other tracks shown live on closed-circuit television. This "weird suggestion" became an important part of New York's off-track betting system.

=== Honors and associations ===
DeSalvio Playground (originally named "John DeSalvio Park") on the corner of Spring Street and Mulberry Street in NoLita honors Louis and his father.

DeSalvio was the permanent grand marshal of the Feast of San Gennaro in the Little Italy section of lower Manhattan. He was also a close friend of Carmine DeSapio, leader of Tammany Hall in the 1940s who became New York Secretary of State before suffering electoral defeats and, in 1969, a federal criminal conviction for conspiracy to bribe a state water official.

After his retirement from public life, Louis F. DeSalvio Corner in Mid-Lower Manhattan, was named for him.

== General Reference ==
- Louis DeSalvio Papers, 1958-1978. M.E. Grenander Department of Special Collections and Archives, University Libraries, University at Albany, State University of New York (hereafter referred to as the DeSalvio Papers).

New York State Assembly
Preceded by Louis J. Capozzoli	New York State Assembly; New York County, 2nd District; 1941–1965	Succeeded by district abolished
Preceded by new district	New York State Assembly; 66th District; 1966	Succeeded by S. William Green
Preceded by Robert F. Kelly	New York State Assembly; 60th District; 1967–1972	Succeeded by Lucio F. Russo
Preceded by Andrew Stein	New York State Assembly; 62nd District; 1973–1979	Succeeded by Paul M. Viggiano
