= Jen Bekman Gallery =

Coordinates: 40°43′15.7″N 73°59′39.6″W

Jen Bekman Gallery is a former art gallery located at 6 Spring Street in New York City. It was established by Jen Bekman in March 2003 on Spring Street west of Bowery, and closed in August 2013. Bekman's goals were to help emerging artists become more appreciated, and to encourage a broader swath of people to feel comfortable buying art. Jen Bekman Gallery exhibited the work of artists in the mediums of photography, works on paper, paintings and mixed media.

Jen Bekman Projects have included 20×200 (editioned prints at affordable prices) (2007–2013), Hey, Hot Shot! (an international competition for emerging photographers) (2004–2012), jen@joe (a revolving exhibition of photographs at Joe, affordably priced and available for purchase online only) (2003–2006), and Personism (a personal blog about design, photography, and current events) (2009–2010).

In 2006, Bekman was named an Innovator of the Year by American Photo. They wrote, "She's developing a new generation of photo artists and consumers."

== 20×200 ==
About Four Thirty by William Wegman (2010)

20×200 is an e-commerce site by Jen Bekman Projects that sells original artist editions at affordable prices. The company received $800,000 in Series A funding in October 2009, with an additional $2 million secured in August 2010.

When the business first launched, the smallest size was reprinted in the largest batch — an edition of 200 — and sold at the lowest price — $20. Hence the name 20×200 (pronounced: "twenty by two-hundred").

According to Bekman, the company brought in $2.5 million in revenue in 2010, including $100,000 worth of work by artist William Wegman in a single day in February.

In January 2013, 20x200 went offline and operations were suspended. The board of 20×200 including lead investor Tony Conrad resigned and the company's staff were dismissed. The company reportedly left hundreds of unfulfilled orders and owes vendors tens of thousands of dollars. Bekman has not commented publicly.

The site relaunched in April 2014 as a beta on youshouldbuyart.com, bringing back artist editions as well as expanding their public domain collection. The company later moved back to the original domain at 20x200.com.

== Artists represented ==
- Joseph O. Holmes
