= New York City Fire Museum =

Museum in Manhattan, New York

Coordinates: 40°43′33″N 74°0′25″W

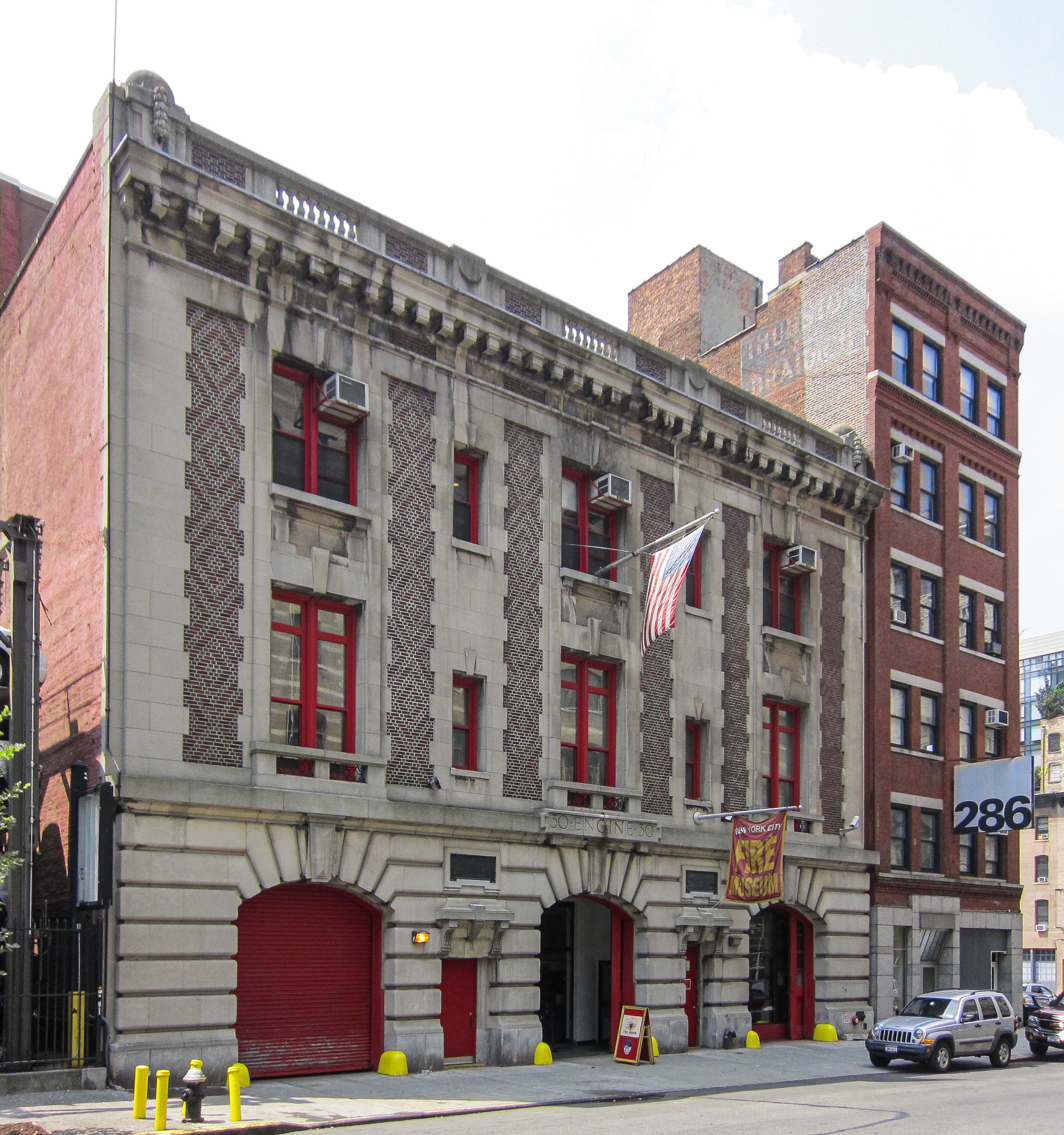
The New York City Fire Museum is located in a renovated 1904 firehouse

The New York City Fire Museum is a museum dedicated to the New York City Fire Department (FDNY) in the Hudson Square neighborhood of Manhattan, New York City. It is housed in the former quarters of the FDNY's Engine Company No. 30, a renovated 1904 fire house at 278 Spring Street between Varick and Hudson Streets.

The museum cares for over 10,000 objects as well as an archive of records, ephemera and photographs estimated in the tens of thousands of pieces celebrating the history of the fire service and the FDNY. Examples of modern-day firefighting equipment, as well as a permanent memorial to the 343 members of the FDNY who died at the World Trade Center site after the September 11 attacks, are also on permanent display at the museum. In November 2015 the museum was granted an Absolute Charter by the Board of Regents of the New York State Department of Education. The entity that runs the museum is classified as a 501(c)(3) organization.

== History ==
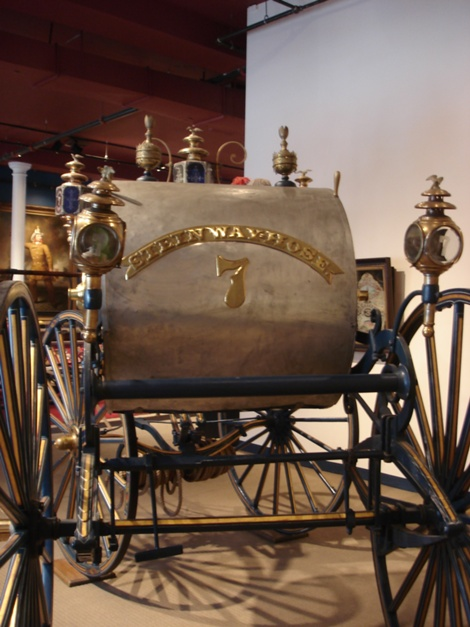
The Steinway Hose No. 7

The NYC Fire Museum's roots date back to December 1870 when it was established in Fire Department Headquarters at 155 Mercer Street. between Prince and Houston Streets in Manhattan. Exactly when it was dismantled is not documented but was most likely at the time that headquarters were relocated to East 67th Street in the late 1880s. When the NYC Fire College was established in the Packard Building at 32-02 Queens Boulevard in Long Island City, Queens, Chief John McKenna ordered that the relics be set up as a museum, along with a library, on the building's seventh floor. A better home was secured in 1948 in the new FDNY apparatus repair shops at 48-58 35th Street in Long Island City. It remained there until 1958 when a bay was vacated at the quarters of Engine Company 7 and Hook & Ladder Company 1 at 100 Duane Street in Manhattan. This location made it much easier for the general public to visit the impressive array of artifacts exhibited on two floors of the firehouse.

In 1981, the Home Insurance Company decided to dismantle its H. V. Smith Firefighting Museum, located at 59 Maiden Lane. The collection was donated to the City of New York. However, the collection was so extensive that it could not be accommodated at the Duane Street location. The FDNY embarked on a campaign to raise the necessary funding to convert the vacant beaux-arts firehouse at 278 Spring Street originally built for Engine Company 30 in 1904 into a state-of-the-art museum. The Friends of the New York City Fire Department Collection, Inc., a 501(c)3 organization was formed to raise the necessary funds. On July 6, 1987, the new New York City Fire Museum opened its doors to the public.

On November 17, 2015, the Board of Regents of the University of the State of New York granted an Absolute Charter to the New York City Fire Museum. On March 13, 2017, The Friends of the New York City Fire Department Collection, Inc. and the New York City Fire Museum merged, with the former being dissolved.

Exhibits in the museum demonstrate the changes in firefighting practices from bucket brigades to carriages to engines. The evolution of the department itself, from volunteer firefighters to municipal fire departments is also covered. The museum also houses a special memorial to the 343 members of the FDNY who lost their lives in the September 11 attacks. This memorial includes artifacts recovered from the World Trade Center site, as well as a monument commemorating each firefighter who made the Supreme Sacrifice.

The collection contains items that date back to the mid-17th century. As a result, the museum displays only 3% of its entire collection at any given time.

Retired FDNY firefighters are often on hand to educate the public on firefighting history as well as to relate personal anecdotes. The museum is also active in fire safety and prevention education and has a mock apartment highlighting fire hazards for its kindergarten though 12th-grade programs.

The New York City Fire Museum attracts approximately 40,000 visitors a year. Attendance at the museum spiked to 46,000 visitors in 2002 following the September 11 attacks, but and has since leveled off.

In May 2024, the museum announced a temporary closure due to concerns about the building's structural integrity.

== Permanent exhibitions ==
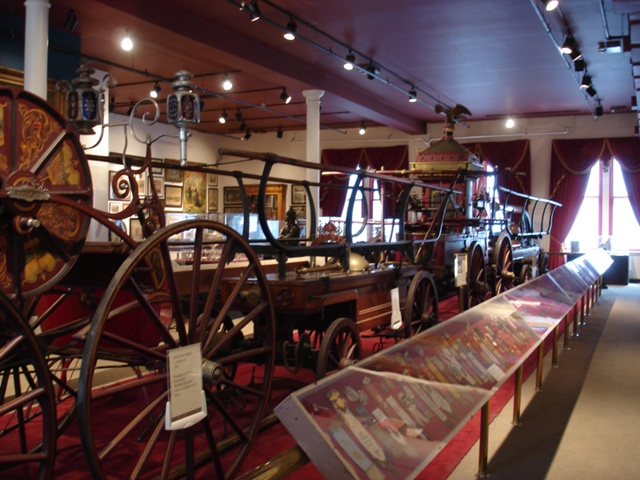
"Firefighting on Parade" at the New York City Fire Museum

The New York City Fire Museum tells the story of the early days of firefighting in New York City. The collection is home to firefighting artifacts and equipment dating back to the 1650s, such as carriages, engines, fire marks, buckets, trumpets, helmets, lanterns, rattles, and uniforms. Permanent exhibitions include: Firefighting on Parade, Romance of Firefighting, Fire Apparatus, and Tools and Uniforms. The museum also has an extensive collection of fire insurance marks.

== Fire safety education ==
In conjunction with the FDNY Fire Safety Education Unit and the FDNY Foundation, a structured program for school groups is offered. Groups are shown an age-targeted video in a classroom setting and are then taken to a mock residence where they experience what they must do to escape from a smoke-filled room. In 2018, the mock residence was completely renovated, with funds provided by Turner Construction Company, Carnegie Corporation, FM Global, and the NY Community Trust, into the Fire Safety Learning Center. Now equipped with interactive components, the center will be open to families and can be visited without the need for an escorted guide.

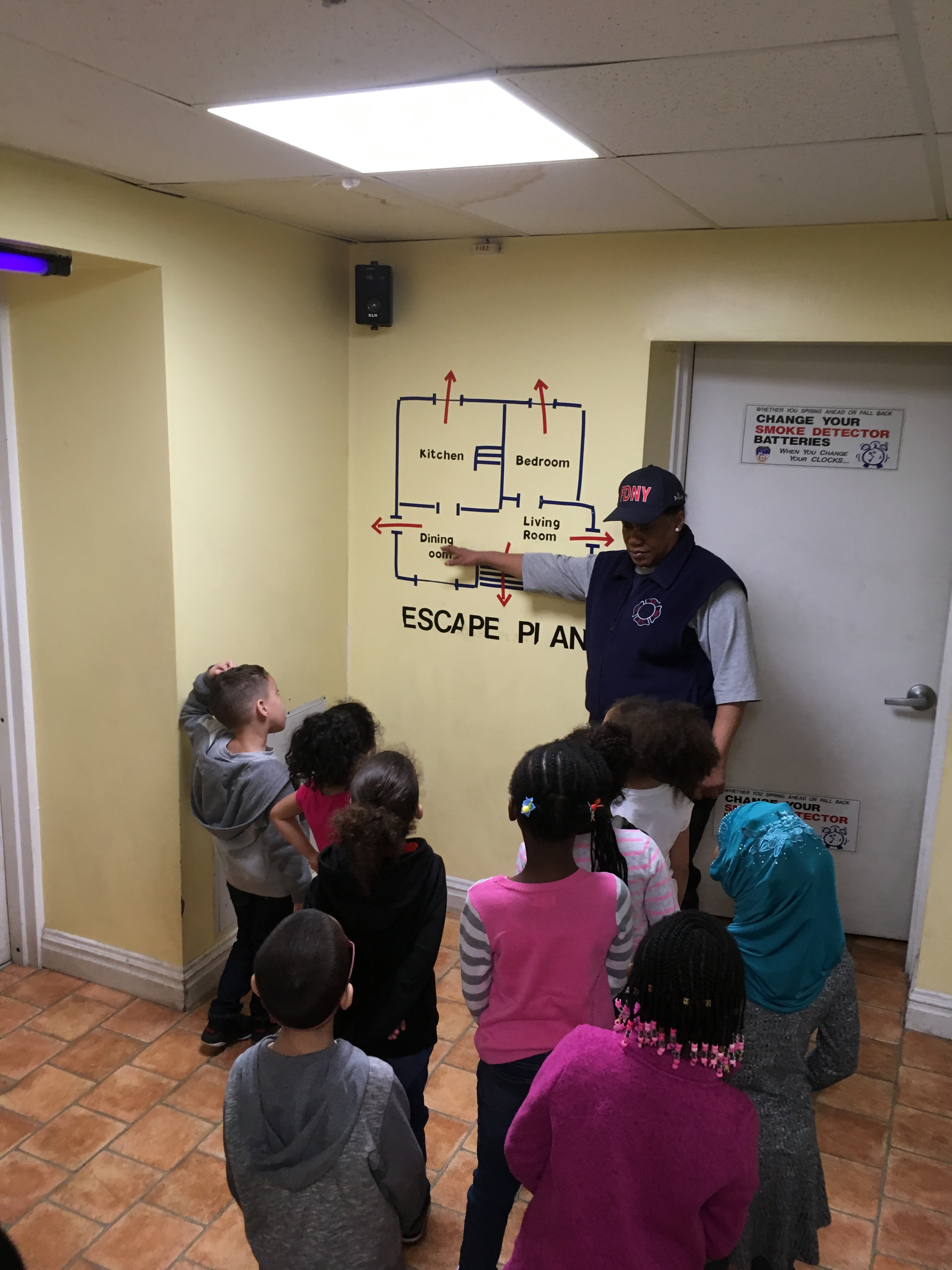
School children learning how to make a fire safety escape plan.

== See also ==
- List of museums and cultural institutions in New York City
