= Commercial graffiti =

Graffiti for which the artist is paid

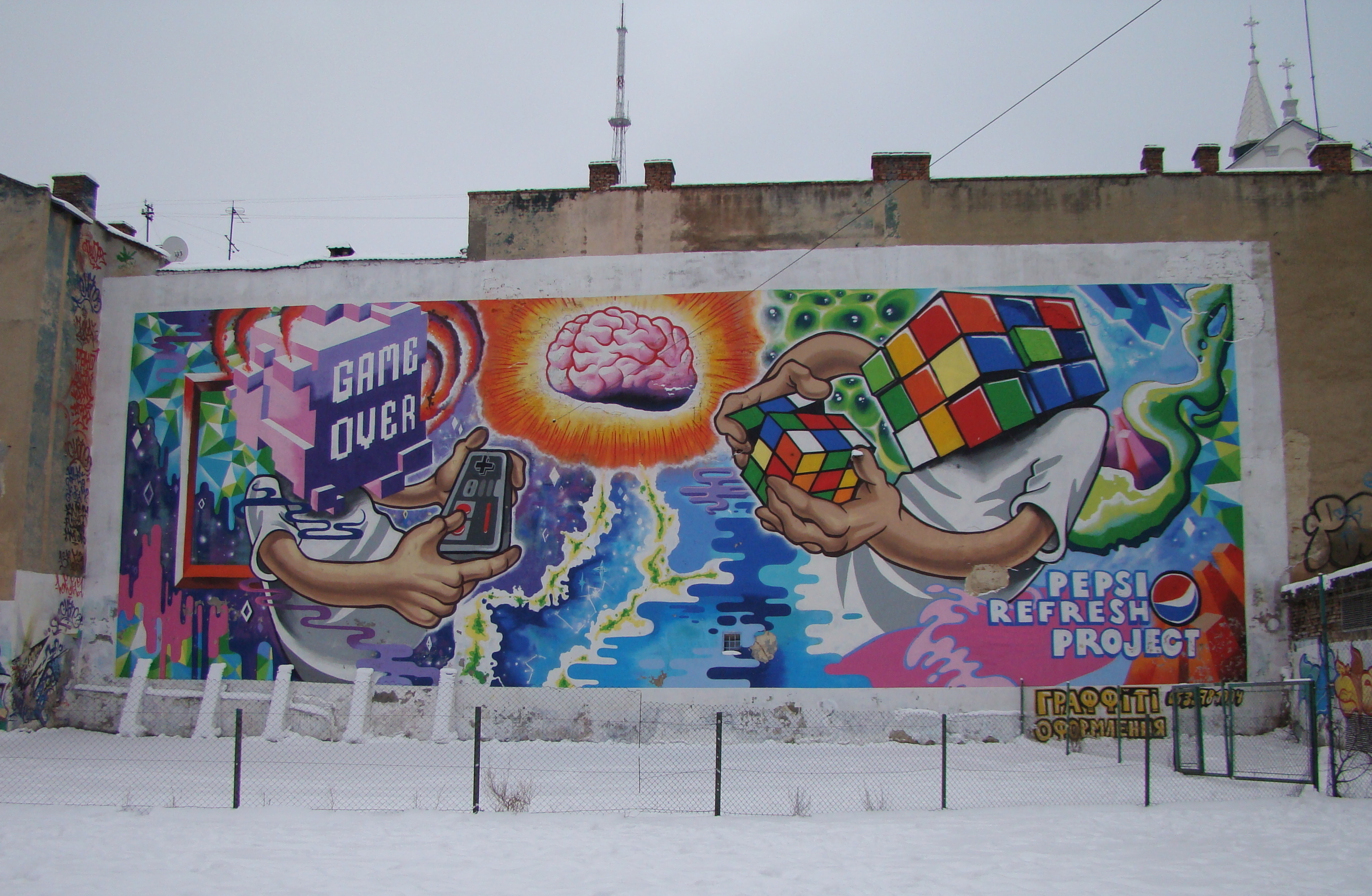
- A Pepsi branded graffiti mural painted as part of the Pepsi Refresh Project on a wall in Halytskyi District, Lviv in 2012
- Years active: 1968-present
- Location: Global
- Influences: Graffiti

Commercial graffiti (also known as aerosol advertising or graffiti for hire) is the commercial practice of graffiti artists being paid for their work. In New York City in particular, commercial graffiti is big business and since the 1980s has manifested itself in many of the major cities of Europe such as London, Paris and Berlin. Increasingly it has been used to promote video games and even feature prominently within them, reflecting a real life struggle between street artists and the law. Commercial graffiti has created significant controversy between those who view it as an effective medium of advertising amongst specific target audiences and those who believe that legal graffiti and advertising using it encourages illegal graffiti and crime.

== History ==
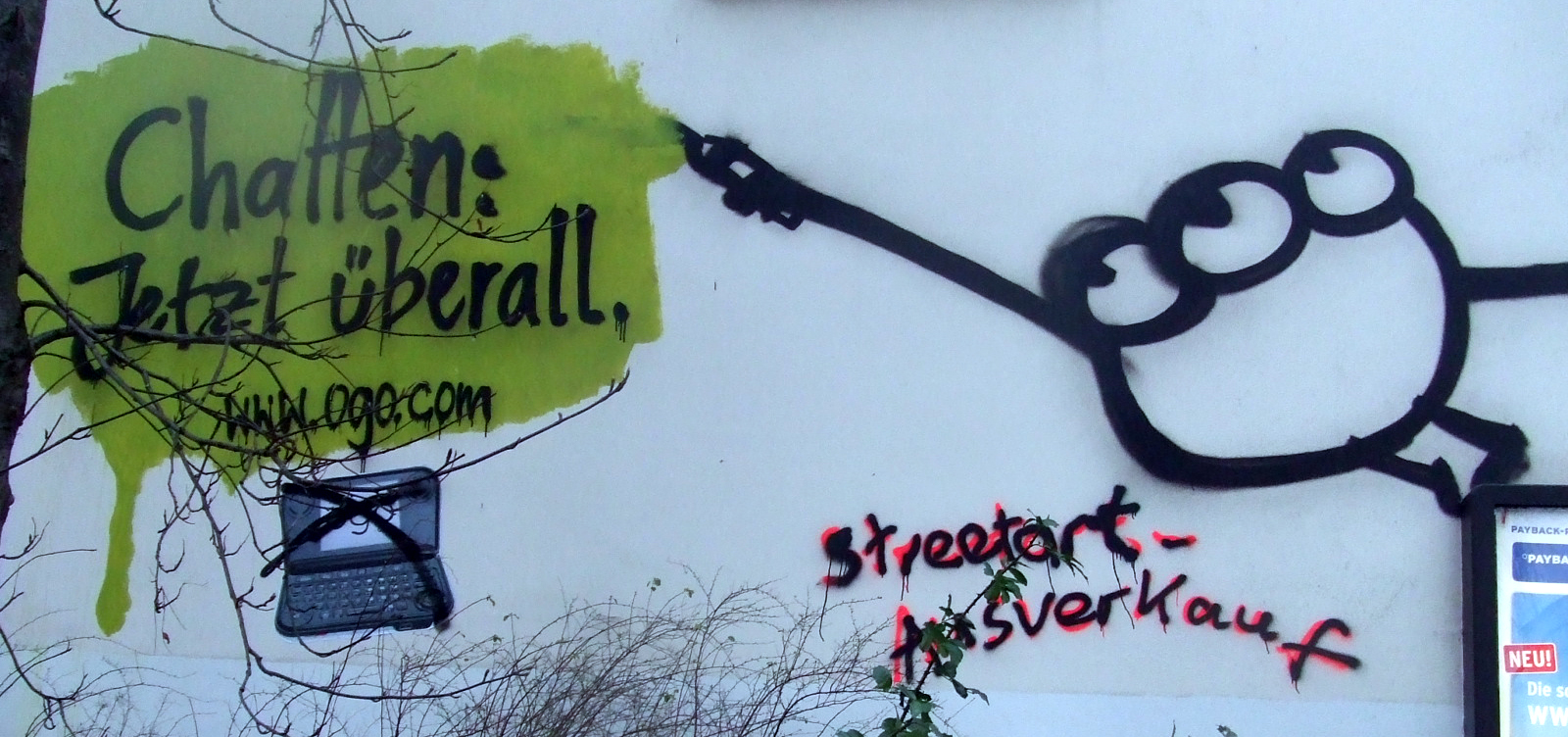
Street art advertising e-scooter startup brand Ogo in Germany, 2008

Graffiti as a commercial activity dates back to Ancient Greece, when pottery makers employed artists to decorate their items with motifs and intricate designs. The modern era, the phenomenon has been strongly associated with New York City since the late 1960s and the hip hop culture that emerged in the 1980s, according to a 1993 New York Times article that focused on the issue. The term "commercial graffiti" was used in an article by Time as early as 1968 and used to describe activity in Chicago as early as 1970. In 1981, Times Square was referenced as featuring "commercial graffiti" through "Japanization", and more recently further "Japanization" of children's culture is cited to be taking place through forms of graffiti in video games and in the increasing popularity of Japanese innovations such as anime. Since the early 1980s, commercial graffiti has evidenced itself in Los Angeles and other major American cities and across Europe, particularly Paris, and London and Berlin and features on the walls of numerous galleries across Europe.

With the increasing popularity and legitimization of graffiti, it has increasingly undergone commercialization. In 2001, computer giant IBM launched an advertising campaign in Chicago and San Francisco which involved people spray painting on sidewalks a peace symbol, a heart, and a penguin (Linux mascot), to represent "Peace, Love, and Linux." However, due to illegalities some of the street artists were arrested and charged with vandalism, and IBM was fined more than US$120,000 for punitive and clean-up costs.

== Controversy ==
The practice of commercial artistry is controversial, because many commercial establishments feel that professional graffiti art is a valuable form of advertising, while other businesses, law enforcement and others disagree. Legal and commercial graffiti is increasing and has created significant debate amongst graffiti writers and those associated with hip-hop culture. The primary concern by those who oppose graffiti is that the tolerance of professional graffiti in one space leads to more illegal graffiti in other spaces. In some areas such as sports, over advertising in sports venues and even player uniforms in soccer has sometimes been viewed negatively.

Commercial graffiti, seen as a frontier between the street world and the art world, is argued in some cases to promote a more responsible lifestyle for the graffiti artist through formal employment, which may range from actual graffiti advertising on buildings, to making prints and logos for clothing and gallery showcasing. Nancy MacDonland in her book The graffiti subculture: youth, masculinity, and identity in London and New York argues that commercial graffiti artistry "moves writers out of the boundaries of the subculture", because artists "no longer paint for their peers and themselves, they have a new audience".

Even in major cities such as New York City and Chicago, commercial graffiti has created some very mixed reactions. For instance in Chicago, despite a significant following in graffiti artistry, in the mid-1980s a commercial which featured a kid spraying "The end is near" caused considerable outrage by Chicago citizens who protested to the Ford Motor Company to take the commercial off air as they believed it encouraged children to freely graffiti property as they desire. Similarly, in 2005, Peter Vallone Jr., a City Council member in New York and several other councilors protested against Sony's decision to use graffiti commercially in their PlayStation Portable advertising in New York, Chicago, Atlanta, Philadelphia, Los Angeles and Miami as they believed it would have a negative influence on children and encourage them to deface property.

== Commercial success ==
In New York City, legal graffiti and employment has become big business, appearing with owners' permission on everything from walls to railroad boxcars. According to Cooper and Sciorra, many young graffiti artists are keen to use their talents and aspire to achieve entrepreneurial success. Local businesses employing well-known graffiti artists are also said to enhance their credibility and business-customer relationship as well as reducing crime by employment. One prominent group in New York City is the "King of Murals" which run a commercial graffiti business and have been employed to promote global brands such as Coca-Cola and M&M's in advertising campaigns and even hired by schools, hospitals and other healthcare groups to create artwork. Bronx-based TATS CRU has made a name for themselves doing legal advertising campaigns for companies like Coca-Cola, McDonald's, Toyota, and MTV. Smirnoff and even Microsoft have hired artists to use reverse graffiti (the use of high pressure hoses to clean dirty surfaces to leave a clean image in the surrounding dirt) to increase awareness of their product. In 2011, Klughaus Gallery started Graffiti USA, a company offering interior graffiti murals for companies. Their work includes murals at the corporate offices of LinkedIn, Facebook, MasterCard, and ABC News, which featured a Graffiti USA commissioned mural on October 8, 2014, episode of Nightline.

In Boston, Massachusetts, a company named Alt Terrain specializes in hiring graffiti writers to paint legal murals as part of public performances which are hyped as "brand events" and may cost up to $12,500 for live performances. In Pittsfield, Massachusetts for example, after the death of Michael Jackson, Solomon "Disco" Stewart and a team of four artists named "The Berkshire Graffiti Network" for instance were paid to paint a "Michael Jackson Tribute" mural on the wall of a Pittsfield market on North Street.

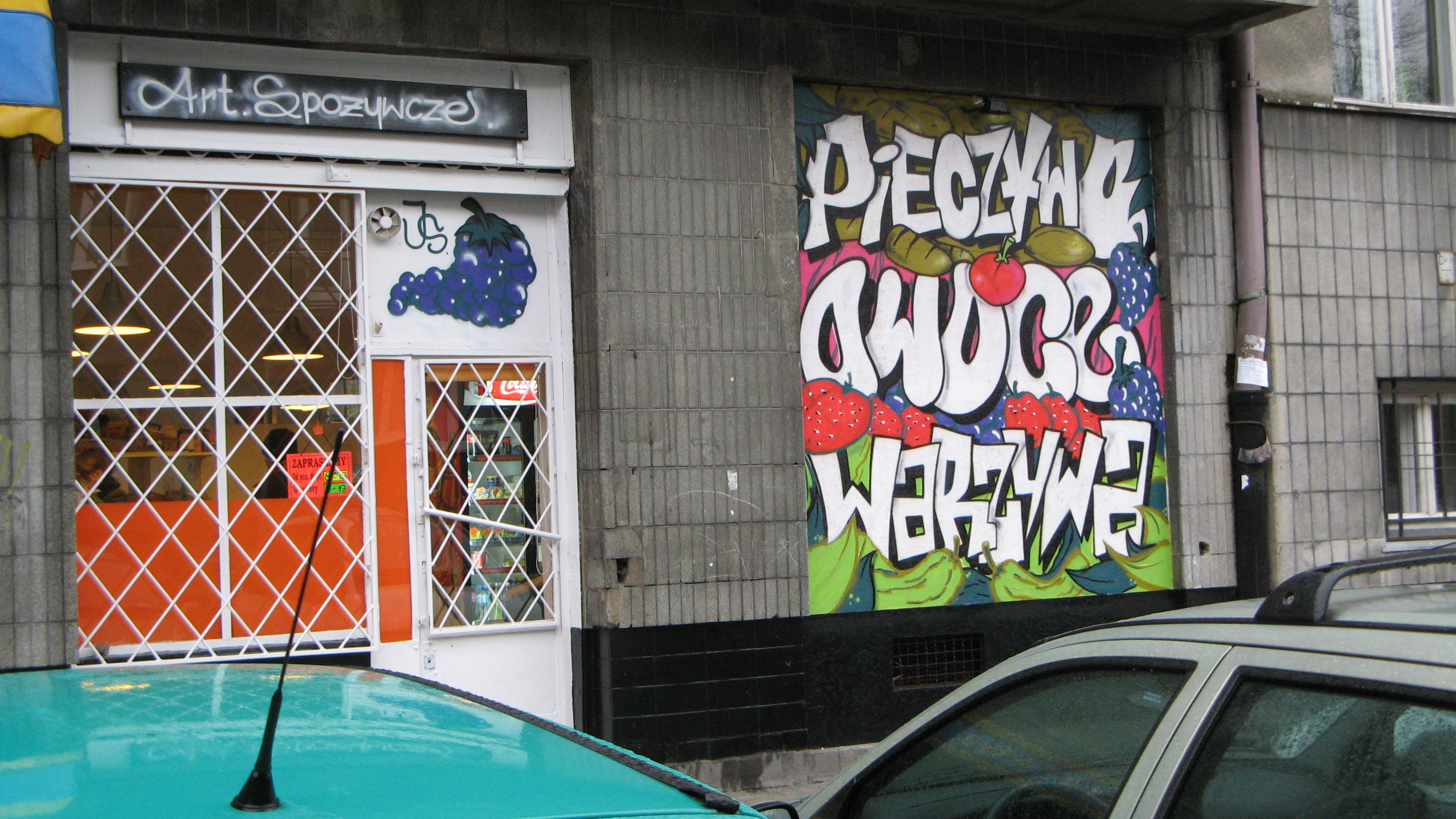
Legal graffiti-style advertising on a grocer's shop window in the Old Mokotów area of Warsaw, Poland, 2009

In the United Kingdom, Covent Garden's Boxfresh used stencil images of a Zapatista revolutionary in the hopes of cross referencing would promote their store. Even the Israeli West Bank barrier has acted as a canvas for professional graffiti for hire teams. One Palestinian pacifist group will spray paint any message for 30 Euros, providing that it is not racist or violently motivated. The Art Crimes website is the first to be established in the field of commercial graffiti and hires some sixty artists to produce artwork.

=== In video games ===
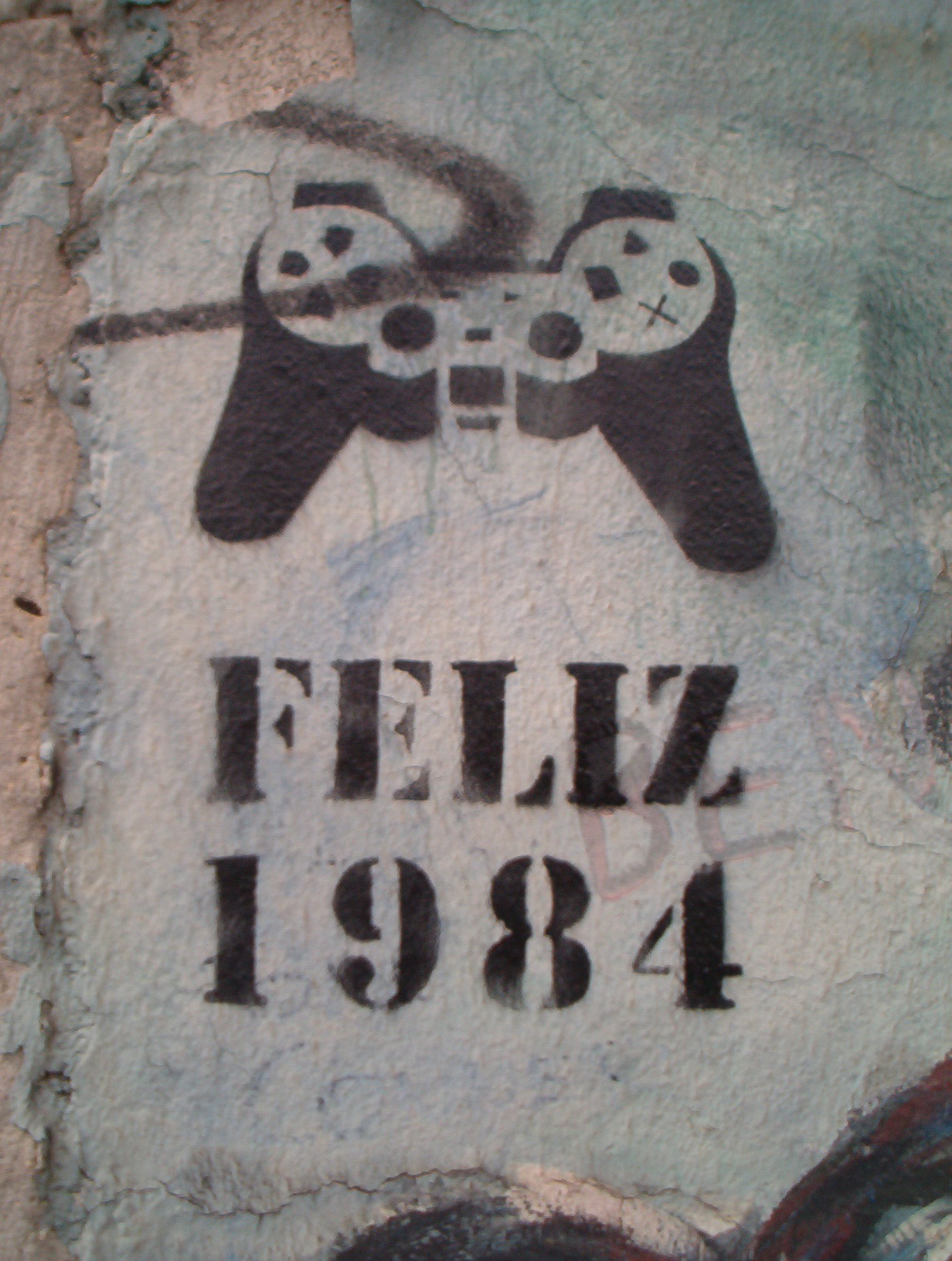
An example of crossover between video game culture and graffiti culture found on the Berlin Wall

Graffiti has become an important part of video game culture, often reflecting the oppression facing graffiti artists in public and battle for it to be seen by the establishment as a legitimate and indeed a legal art form. The Jet Set Radio series (2000–2003) tells the story of a group of teens fighting the oppression of a totalitarian police force that attempts to limit the graffiti artists' freedom of speech and others such as Rakugaki Ōkoku series (2003–2005) for Sony's PlayStation 2 revolves around an anonymous hero and his magically imbued-with-life graffiti creations as they struggle against an evil king who only allows art to be produced which can benefit him. Similarly Marc Eckō's Getting Up: Contents Under Pressure (2006), features a story line involving training in graffiti artistry and fighting against a corrupt city and its oppression of free speech, as in the Jet Set Radio series. Numerous other non-graffiti-centric video games allow the player to produce graffiti, such as the Half-Life series, the Tony Hawk's series, The Urbz: Sims in the City, Rolling and Grand Theft Auto: San Andreas.

=== In apparel ===
Graffiti has become a common stepping stone for many members of both the art and design community in North America and abroad. Within the United States, graffiti artists such as Mike Giant, Persue, Rime, Noah and countless others have made careers in skateboard, apparel and shoe design for companies such as DC Shoes, Adidas, Rebel8 Osiris or Circa Meanwhile, there are many others such as DZINE, Daze, Blade, The Mac etc. which have developed into gallery artists and at times do not even use their initial medium (spray paint) to produce artwork.

Keith Haring, a well-known graffiti artist, contributed to bringing graffiti to the commercial mainstream. In the 1980s, Haring opened his first Pop Shop: a store that offered everyone access to his works—which until then could only be found spray-painted on city walls. Pop Shop offered commodities like bags and T-shirts. Haring explained that, "The Pop Shop makes my work accessible. It's about participation on a big level, the point was that we didn't want to produce things that would cheapen the art. In other words, this was still art as statement". Marc Ecko, an urban clothing designer, has been an advocate of graffiti as an art form during this period, stating that "Graffiti is without question the most powerful art movement in recent history and has been a driving inspiration throughout my career."

But perhaps the greatest example of graffiti artists infiltrating mainstream pop culture is by the French crew, 123Klan. 123Klan founded as a graffiti crew in 1989 by Scien and Klor, have gradually turned their hands to illustration and design while still maintaining their graffiti practice and style. In doing so they have designed and produced, logos and illustrations, shoes, and fashion for numerous global firms.

=== Tourism ===
Most of the major cities across the world have graffiti and street art tours, often run by local graffiti artists who want to bring their talent to the public on a more socially accepted level. For example, graffiti tours exist in New York, London, Berlin, Hamburg, Reykjavik, Barcelona, Montreal and Paris.

Originally starting with walking or biking tours around cities, street art tours have expanded to include graffiti workshops, using graffiti art tools, stencils, and spray cans.

Graffiti with political or social commentary also incentivises tourism. Mainstream attraction also opens the ways for museums and galleries to adopt graffiti in their collections.

There are several ways and methods to work with or use graffiti in a positive way and free the art from its criminal background. Firstly, graffiti can be exhibited and collected as documents of a performance piece by the institutions which allows them to work with the piece easily. And it also allows scholars to get more insight in the art form. Secondly, as graffiti still chooses social, political and cultural issues as subject matter the photography and internet allow the message to travel around the globe. So, it reaches a great number of audiences which some of them takes the act of going and seeing the piece and the spot. This affects the tourism of that place if advertised and handled properly. Lastly, graffiti originated and is still created in the abandoned urban areas and marginalized neighbourhoods where the residents are from various social levels. The condition of these territories are mostly poor and therefore not suitable for commercial use or tourism. Because graffiti has this aspect and the potential it also has the potential to be an agency in urban development. If the ways mentioned above are accomplished, the graffiti bringing attention to these areas makes it possible for municipalities to take action in developments of these areas as well.

The digital age allowed graffiti to be outside of mainstream art or "high art" yet still shape the ways it forms via mainstream media. The posting of photos of graffiti works on social media exposes people around the globe to these works and their surroundings, allowing people to locate and see the work in-person. This allows these areas to attract more public attention and tourism, which incentivises local governments to make improvements to the area. Due to this, some argue that the view of graffiti by the public and institutions as a negative act is no longer applicable, and that is now a tool of community building, urban development and tourism.

=== Marketing ===
Commercial graffiti is sometimes used in guerrilla marketing. This was initially mostly done by smaller companies due to small budgets, but was later adopted by big brands (e.g. Coca-Cola). This type of marketing has the potential to gain internet virality on social media. If there is legal permission from the government to paint graffiti, some artists paint during peak hours in communities for maximum exposure.
