= MURAL Festival =

Annual street art festival in Montreal, Quebec, Canada

- Locations: Montreal, Quebec, Canada
- Founded: 2013
- Founder: André Bathalon; Yan Cordeau; Alexis Froissart; Nicolas Munn Rico
- Attendance: 1.15 million visitors in 2015
- Organiser: LNDMRK
- Website: muralfestival.com

The MURAL Festival is an annual international street art festival held every June since 2013 in Montreal, Quebec, Canada. It aims to celebrate the democratization of urban art in the city of Montréal. Artists from around the world are invited to participate in the festival every year and contribute with their personal perspectives of the art. The art itself is part of the free art movement which stems from the free-culture movement. Thus, all murals immediately enter the public domain as free content or open content when they are created and there is an absence of copyright laws. All the art is free to be viewed and photographed. It has been described by the festival's co-creator as "an extension of the Mile End", and the festival's self-proclaimed mission is to "democratize art".

The festival is a free event open to all ages, and it is held on several streets in Montreal, such as the Saint Laurent Boulevard, Sherbrooke Street, and Mount Royal Avenue. Along with the mural projects are a variety of street vendors and food trucks that cater to the public. The three most important partners of the MURAL festival are Fido, LNDMRK, and Saint Laurent Boulevard. However, there are also numerous other partners such as Hennessy, Red Bull, and Poppers that are also involved and some participate in the street vending.

== Artists ==
| Year | Artists |
|---|---|
| 2013 | A'SHOP, Bonar, Chris Dyer, Christina Angelina, En Masse, Escif, Gaia, Jason Botkin, LNY, Omen, Other, Paria Crew, Phlegm, Pixel Pancho, Reka One, ROA, Stare & Tchug, WZRDGNG |
| 2014 | 123KLAN, 2501, Alex Scaner, Alexis Dias, BEZT DA ETAM CRU, Bryan Beyung, Cyrcle, Inti, Kashnik, Kevin Ledo, Labrona, Rone, RRDB, Seth, VILX, ZEMA, ZILON, Zoltan |
| 2015 | 2ALAS, Astro, Axel Void, Benny Wilding, Bicicleta Sem Frei, Curiot, Earth Crusher De A'Shopi, Elian, Eric Clement, Faith 47, Jarus, Jaz, MC Baldassari, Melissa Del Pinto, MONK.E, Nychos, Opire |
| 2016 | Acidum Project, Buff Monster, D*FACE, FAFI, Felipe Pantone, Five Eight, FONKI, GREMS, HSIX, Jonathan Bergeron, Klone Yourself, Maser, Mateo, Meggs, Miss Teri, Natalia, Rak, Roadsworth, Stikki Peaches, X-Ray |
| 2017 | 1010, Ayadin Matlabi & Miss Me Vision Mondiale, Dodo Ose, Fintan Magee, FLUKE, HOARKOAR, INSA, Jason Wasserman, Kevin Ledo, MADC, Monosourcil, MORT, NuriaMora, OLA VOLO, ONUR, Ricardo Cavolo, Ron English, Ruben Sanchez, Sbuone, SCRIBE |
| 2018 | ASVP, Ben EIne, CRYPTIK, CYRCLE, DEMSKY, Drew Merritt, Jeremy Shantz, Kate, Raudenbush, Le Monstr, LSNR, Marc Sirus, Michael Reeder, PONI & Cyrielle Tremblay, Sandra Chevrier, Saner, Sara Erenthal, Smithe, STARE, Tristan Eaton, Waxhead, WHATISADAM |

== History ==
=== 2013 ===
The inaugural edition of the festival took place in June 2013. During the four-day event, more than 25 local, national and international street artists worked separately and in concert across twenty building facades chosen to be covered. Boulevard St-Laurent was closed to vehicular traffic between the Sherbrooke and Mont-Royal arteries. Every evening, festive activities was organized on site. The festival ended with a free musical show presented in collaboration with Osheaga, the Oshee & Aga Block Party, headlined by DJs Ryan Emsworth, Grandtheft, Prison Guard, KenLo Craqnuques and Jeanbart & RRKelly.

=== 2014 ===
In 2014, the MURAL Festival was held between June 12 and June 15, 2014. During this year, the festival started Le Market, a pop up shop in the Parc du Portugal. This market allowed festival attendees to listen shop local stores while listening to live music. MURAL also worked with ExCentris Cinema to present screenings of street art and graffiti related short films. Every day, the MURAL Block Party had live stage music in the parking lot behind Station 16 Gallery on St. Laurent. In the same lot, the popular Parisian artist Kashink painted the festival's sponsored mural this year in the same lot. This mural took over from the En Masse mural displayed during the previous year's festival.

=== 2015 ===
For MURAL's 2015 edition, the festival extended their 2014 period of 4 days to 11 days, from June 4 until June 14. These news dates coincidentally overlapped with Grand Prix weekend. Boulevard Saint-Laurent was again closed off to traffic from Sherbrooke Street to Mont-Royal Avenue, in order to accommodate artists and festival attendees to look at the street art. Twenty new murals were painted for 2015s festival, which brought the number of murals created since the festival first to a whopping 50. This festival also allowed visitors to partake in guided tours and attend presentations films on the subject. Le Market continued, allowing festival goers to shop local market stalls and visit street art galleries.

=== 2016 ===
The fourth annual MURAL Festival ran from June 9 to 19, continuing the 10 day long festival period from the previous year. In 2016, MURAL co-organizer Andre Bathalon mentioned his goal for the festival: for attendees to watch artists at work, so they can gain an appreciation for the detail that goes into each piece. Bathalon continued, "The goal is really to attract the attention, so we're not doing any subtle concepts. All the drawings are edgy, punchy so they really make you stop to say 'Wow'." 2016's festival featured world renowned artists from 8 different countries. They had 29 local, national, and international artists, and five earlier murals were replaced with new murals for the new year. The festival started from "mural central" behind the LNDMRK offices, goes up St-Dominique and the eastern side of St-Laurent then down Clark—all of these spaces are "pedestrian only" during the duration of the festival. In 2016, MURAL Festival was officially recognized as the "largest gathering of urban art in North America… bringing MURAL's permanent public legacy to more than 60 major works."

For the first time in festival history, ScHoolboy Q—a popular rap artist—performed on a stage in the main "performance" parking lot on St. Laurent.

=== 2017 ===
The 2017 MURAL festival ran from June 8 to 18, from 10am to 10pm. This years events were described as "ambitious and festive", in order to celebrate festivals 5th edition—the largest edition so far. By this time, MURAL wanted to consolidate itself as one of the world's largest urban art happenings. They continued to show murals, music, exhibitions, pop-up installations, conferences, films, and their local pop-up shops.

This year, the festival size grew to include the area of Old Montreal, while partnering with the local merchants association. They also re-configured the concert area on St-Laurent to accommodate more visitors. The most notable artist to perform this year was Grammy-nominated singer Post Malone.

About twenty new murals were created in 2017 to enhance to add to the long map of murals, spanning from the Quartier des Spectacles up to Mile End. Aaron Li-Hill, Canadian artist living in New York, also produced a large-scale art installation to adorn Saint-Laurent Boulevard all summer long. Additionally, the Montreal famous Leonard Cohen mural was painted by Montreal artist Kevin Ledo for this 5th edition of MURAL Festival.

=== 2018 ===
This 6th edition of MURAL Festival ran from June 7 to 17. After several years of rapid growth from their first festival in 2012, MURAL has "hit a steady groove" while organizing their most recent festival.

This year, MURAL Festival presented a substantial and permanent art installation developed by Cyrcle, a street art pair from Los Angeles, California. This art piece covered two floors of the underground parking lot at Lune Rouge entertainment company headquarters, in the heart of downtown Montreal. Another headlining installation was presented on Parc Avenue by popular Los Angeles artist Michael Reeder.

2018's festival was visited by more than 1.5 million people, and the festival itself made some major upgrades to accommodate its growing popularity. The festival's main St Laurent market space also grew to include even more temporary retail spaces and food trucks. The festival also released a VIP experience at a cost, which gave customers "discounts on alcohol, exclusive access to numerous musical events and conferences, 1 ticket for a guided tour of the murals, and the chance to meet both artists and influencers in the main VIP Terrace and exclusive Green Room. The Green Room is an inside chilling zone with a private terrace." A Montreal Gazette article mentioned that the festival "typifies Montreal's cachet, bringing together a wide array of eclectic talents to create something captivating." Although it is now more acclaimed than ever, the most recent festival was criticized for expanding too rapidly, therefore outgrowing the music venues for 2018's musicians. 2018's performers included Playboi Carti, Pusha T, and Maky Lavender.

=== 2019 ===
The seventh edition of the 2019 MURAL Festival took place between June 6 and 16. This was the year, Colombian artist and muralist Gleo was the main featured artist of the festival. This was the first time that a female artist featured the MURAL festival.

A new feature was presented to the festival this year, where creations from digital platforms and from original materials were exhibited. The past six editions had only involved painted murals on walls. This year, artists such as Spidertag who installed colourful LED lights in different shapes and forms on the side of a building that lit up at night, Joshua Vides who presented a black and white decorated Mercedes-Benz car, and Laurence Vallières who created a large-scale sculpture from recycled cardboard materials all which presented new forms of art to the festival and city of Montreal.

Musical live performances took place during the festival, featuring local artists such as Milk & Bone, Moonshine, and Alaclair Ensemble. The festival also dedicated an LGBTQ+ evening for those who wanted to participate.

=== 2020: Mural Estival ===
In 2020, the traditional summer festival organized by MURAL Festival which was supposed to be held from June 11thuntil June 21, was canceled and revisited due to the COVID-19 pandemic. Instead, the Mural Festival team set up an "Estival", which means summertime in French, that lasted throughout the summer from June to September on Saint-Laurent Boulevard as usual, but also online. This new version of the festival included the physical street work of mural artists from Quebec and live streams of music performances and digital art animations that happened over a period of three months. During the Estival, guided tours of murals were available to the public in small groups upon reservation to ensure the respect of sanitary measures and social distancing.

==== Corridart ====
Mural Estival put in place an urban artistic infrastructure called Corridart, honouring the original exposition of the same name that took place in Montreal in 1976. During the first phase of Mural Estival (June 21stto August 21), the Corridart infrastructure showcased the work of 12 artists that painted live on outdoor canvas along Saint-Laurent Boulevard. The temporary paintings were then painted over by other artists for the second phase of the festival which took place from August 22thto September 20, 2020.

==== Murals ====
The murals painted across the city for the 2020 edition were made by the mural artists Jeremy Shantz (painting the work of digital artist FVCKRENDER), Ankhone, Denial, Marc-Olivier Lamothe, Burnt Toast and Patrick Forchild. Patrick Forchild's artwork was honouring the work of front-line workers during the pandemic, especially in the healthcare system. His mural was painted on an outside wall of Montreal's Jewish General Hospital.

==== Art Terrace ====
The French Canadian artist Francorama (aka Franco Égalité) painted his work Together Apart With Street Art on an outdoor terrace that was installed on Saint-Laurent boulevard. The terrace was presented by Stella Artois and was opened to the public from August 13 to September 20.

==== Musical performances ====
The launch party of phase 1 of Mural Estival was performed online by the artists Hologramme, Nana Zen and Nate Husser. The musical performances were accompanied by live visual art performances of Francorama, Mono Sourcil and LeBicar. For the second phase of the Estival, the launch party was performed by Les Louanges and Random Recipe and was streaming on Mural Festival's Facebook page live from the PHI Centre. Other musical performances occurred online during the Estival, notably from Claudia Bouvette, Clay and friends, Cozy, Dead Horse Beats, Kirouac & KodakLudo, and Lou Roots.

== Gallery ==
=== Leonard Cohen ===
Title of mural: “Tower of Songs: Hommage à Leonard Cohen”.

The mural is located in the sector of Ville-Marie, precisely at 1420 Rue Crescent, Montreal, QC, H3G 2B1. The mural was completed in summer of 2017, in participation of the Mural Festival. Inspired by Leonard Cohen, the location of the mural situates where Cohen lived part of his life in Montreal. The mural covers a larger apartment building, filling more than 1000 square metres, on its side wall.

The producer of the mural was MU, a charitable organization based in Montreal. The artist Kevin Ledo, from Montreal, painted the mural. The project was funded by the city of Montreal, alongside the donors Brian Levitt, Jonathan Wener, Marcel Elefant, Sari Hornstein, Rossy Family Foundation, J. Gerry Shapiro, and Murray Dalfen.

Today, the mural is recognized for popularizing the MURAL Festival and bringing attraction to the city of Montreal.
