= Christopher Dyer (disambiguation) =

Christopher or Chris Dyer may refer to:

- Christopher Dyer, academic and historian
- Christopher Dyer (politician), LGBT activist and politician based in Washington, DC
- Chris Dyer (engineer) (born 1968), racing engineer
- Chris Dyer (artist) (born 1979), Canadian artist

== See also ==
- Christopher Dye (born 1956), World Health Organization official
