= Natalia Gallego Sanchez =

Colombian street artist (born 1992)

Natalia Gallego Sánchez (1992), also known as Gleo, is a street artist known for her large vibrant murals that often depict mythical creatures and yellow glowing eyes.

== Biography ==
Natalia Gallego Sánchez was born in 1992 in Cali, Colombia. She began experimenting with street art at seventeen years old. Although she started with depictions of sea creatures, she has since transitioned into painting large mystical beings.

== Art ==
In 2022, Gleo painted one of the largest murals in the Netherlands titled, Flower Woman in the Window. The mural was inspired by Ambrosius Bosschaert's Vase of Flowers in a Window. It was painted over the course of twenty-one days.

In 2018, she participated in the Horizontes Mural Project and painted El Sueño Original on a large grain elevator in Wichita, Kansas. The mural was created in an effort to unite the two historically Black and Latinx neighborhoods that the elevator separates. At 50,000 square feet, it broke the record for the largest acrylic mural by a single artist.

In 2016, Gleo did an exhibition titled Origo. Unlike her typical street art, this exhibition included a myriad of art forms such as art on canvas, sculpture, and intervened objects.
