= Graffiti USA =

Graffiti USA is an American agency founded in 2011 in association with Klughaus Gallery, that offers commissioned aerosol spray paint murals and artwork from a group of top professional graffiti artists. Their work includes residential and commercial interiors, business exteriors, graffiti-related set design, traditional graffiti, live artwork at events and sign painting.

== Work ==
Their work is popular with young tech companies and can be seen in the offices of Facebook and LinkedIn. Other corporate office work includes MasterCard and ABC News, which featured a Graffiti USA commissioned mural on October 8, 2014, episode of Nightline.

== See also ==
- Graffiti Research Lab
