= Vase of Flowers in a Window Niche =

Painting by Ambrosius Bosschaert

- Vase with flowers in a window
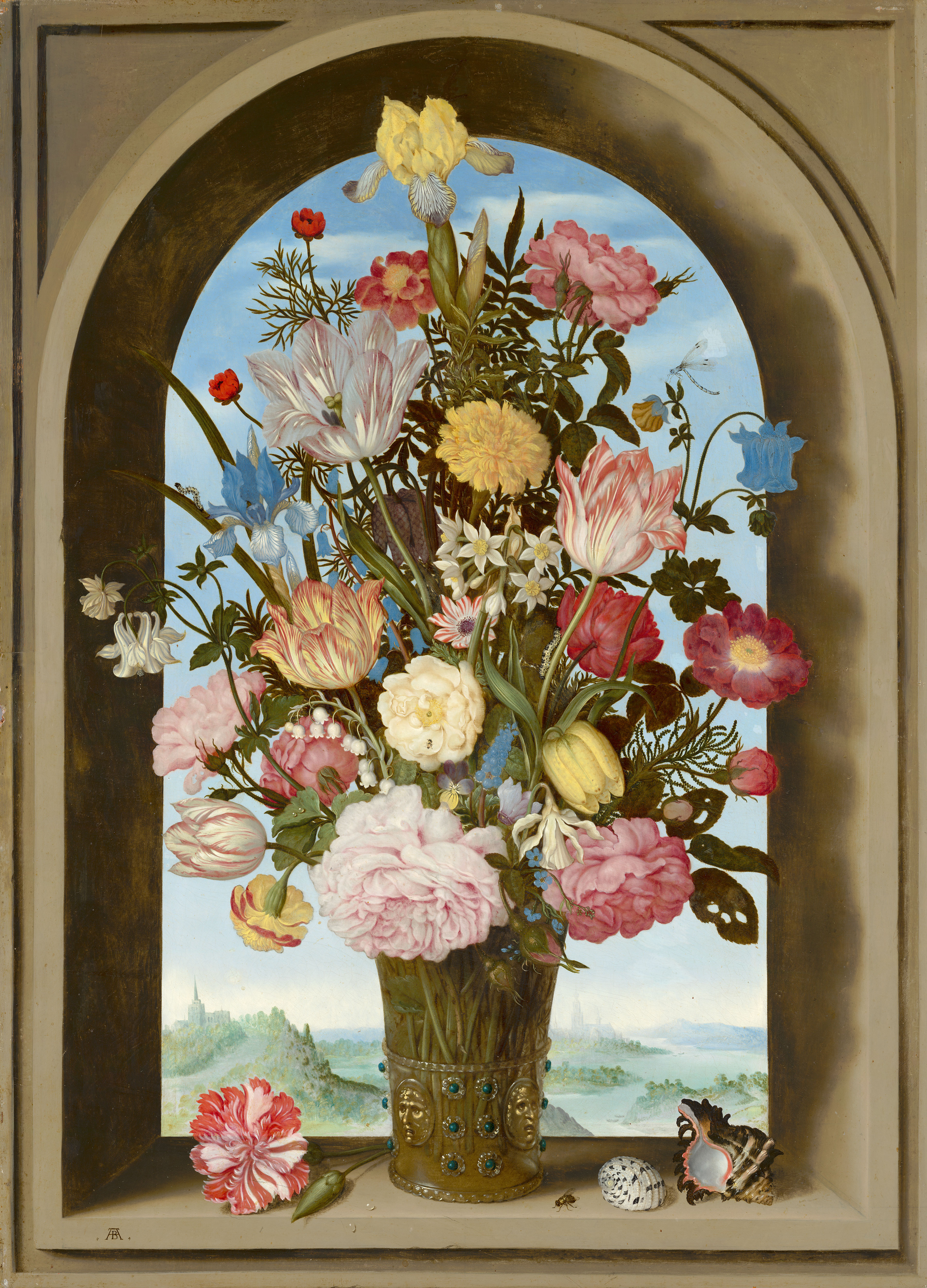
- Artist: Ambrosius Bosschaert
- Year: c. 1618
- Medium: oil paint, panel
- Dimensions: 64 cm (25 in) × 46 cm (18 in)
- Location: Mauritshuis
- Accession: 679

Vase of Flowers in a Window Niche is a still life oil on canvas painting of flowers by Ambrosius Bosschaert the Elder. It was painted in 1620 and is now in the Mauritshuis in The Hague.
