= Chris Dyer (artist) =

Canadian artist (born 1979)

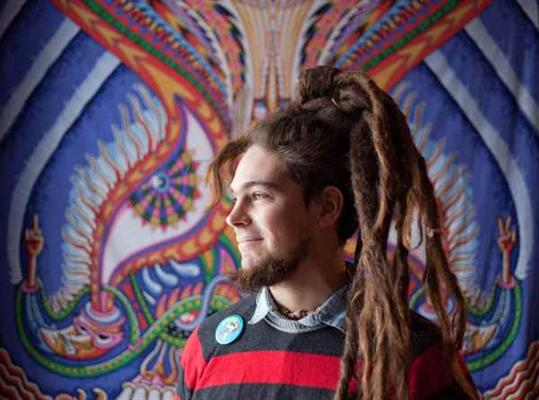
- Born: March 3, 1979 (age 47); Ottawa, Ontario, Canada
- Occupation: Artist
- Movement: Visionary art

Chris Dyer (born March 3, 1979) is a Peruvian–Canadian artist based in St. Petersburg, Florida. Some of his broader artistic themes include consciousness, truth, oneness, introspection, personal development and kindness. He paints using acrylic, pencil, pen, spray paint, gouache and other media on a variety of different forms, including broken or blank skateboards in his early years, various sculptured and recycled items, and now commonly fabric or wood canvas. He is also known for his murals, logos, album covers, posters, illustrations, comic books, travel diaries, and YouTube adventure vlogs.

Dyer was the art director and brand manager of Creation Skateboards/Satori Movement for three and a half years, creating designs for skateboard decks.

== Life ==
Born in Ottawa, Ontario, Canada, Dyer moved to Lima, Peru at age 4. Dyer started skateboarding at 8 years old, and later started to surf at 12. By 14 years old he joined a soccer fan based street gang called "SepUlcro", who were fans of the Universitario de Deportes. Dyer's parents sent him to Canada to study in 1996, at age 17. He lived in Ottawa with his grandmother, where he attended Heritage College and University of Ottawa and during those years he was a heavy drinker and was very self-destructive. He moved to Montreal in 2000 to study Illustration at Dawson College. In the summer of 2001 he went tree planting, which directed Dyer towards a pursuit of a much more spiritual path.

== Art career ==
Dyer started his freelance art career locally, by doing art exhibitions in Montreal. It did not take too long until his work started getting featured in magazines like Thrasher and High Times. This exposure got him further commercial commissions, along solo exhibitions in places like Peru, Mexico, Belgium and all across the United States and Canada. To this point, he has exhibited at galleries around the world, including Vienna, Bali, Costa Rica, Spain, Paris, Berlin, Tokyo, New York City, Denver and Los Angeles. He has shown with renowned artists such as Alex Grey, Shepard Fairey, Robert Venosa, H.R. Giger, and Romio Shrestha. He has also worked with skateboard art legends like Jim Phillips, Wes Humpston, and Andy Howell. Other than exhibiting he also travels to live paint at events and big music festivals like Burning Man (Nevada), Shambhala (British Columbia), and Boom (Portugal).

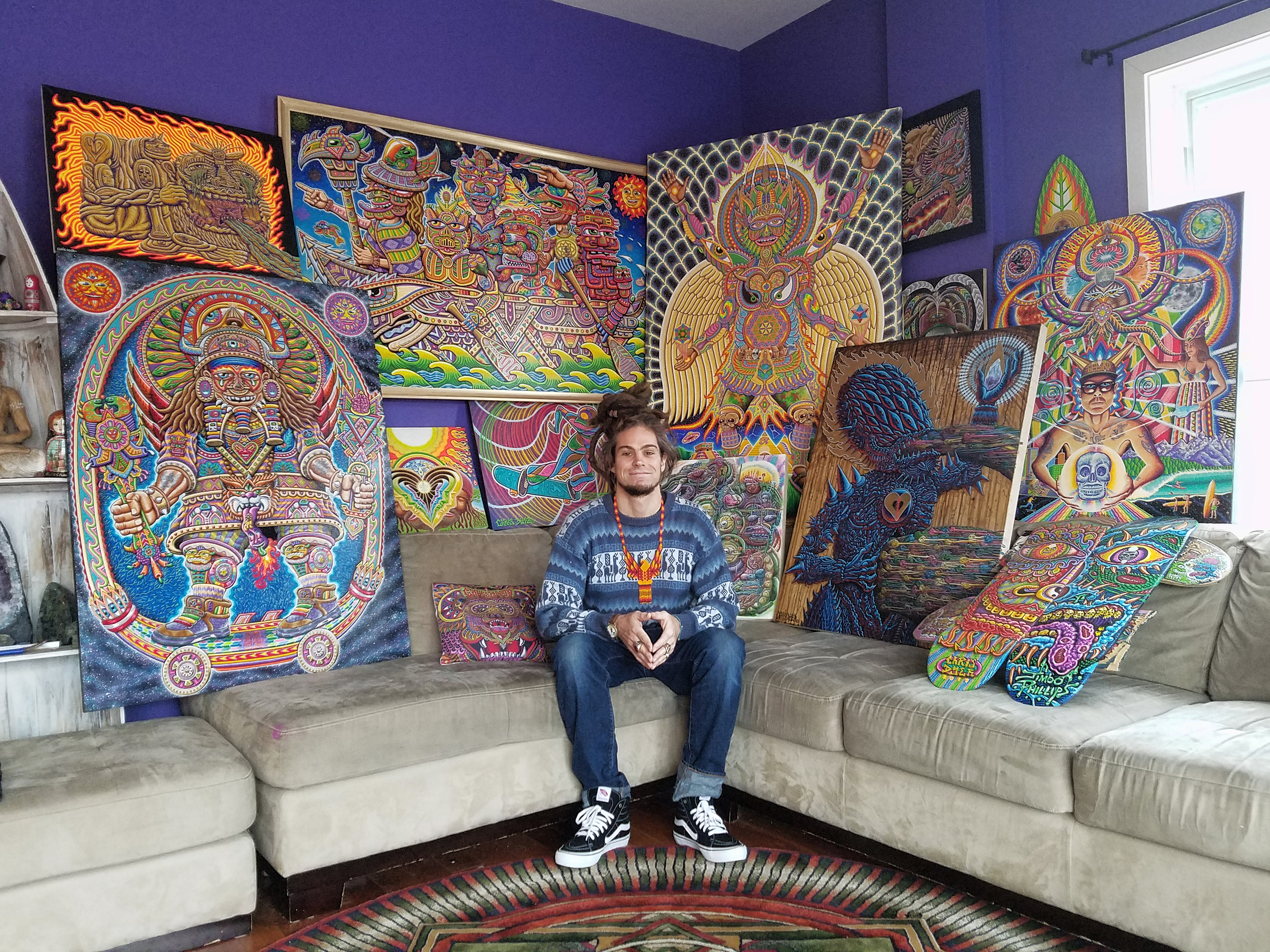
Chris Dyer in his living room in Montreal, Canada.

Dyer launched his own brand, Positive Creations, in 2003, and sells products such as clothing, tapestries, books, backpacks, watches, DVDs, etc. In 2008, he filmed and co-directed a full feature documentary of his life with Dreamtime Cinema. Positive Creations was released as DVD in 2010 and for free on his YouTube channel.

In 2011, Schiffer Publications released a 256-page, hardcover book, of his art. Following that was a coloring book for adults that was published by Last Gasp in 2016.

In the late 2010s, he started offering painting workshops at local high schools in Montreal. This led to offering workshops for artists in places like Italy, Bali, India, Thailand, and Australia. He now offers them at institutions such as the Montreal Museum of Fine Arts, the National Gallery of Canada, The Chapel of Sacred Mirrors and The Vienna Academy of Visionary Art. Starting in 2017, he created an art workshop combined with healing shamanic ceremonies, at Katari Center, in the jungle near Tarapoto, Peru.

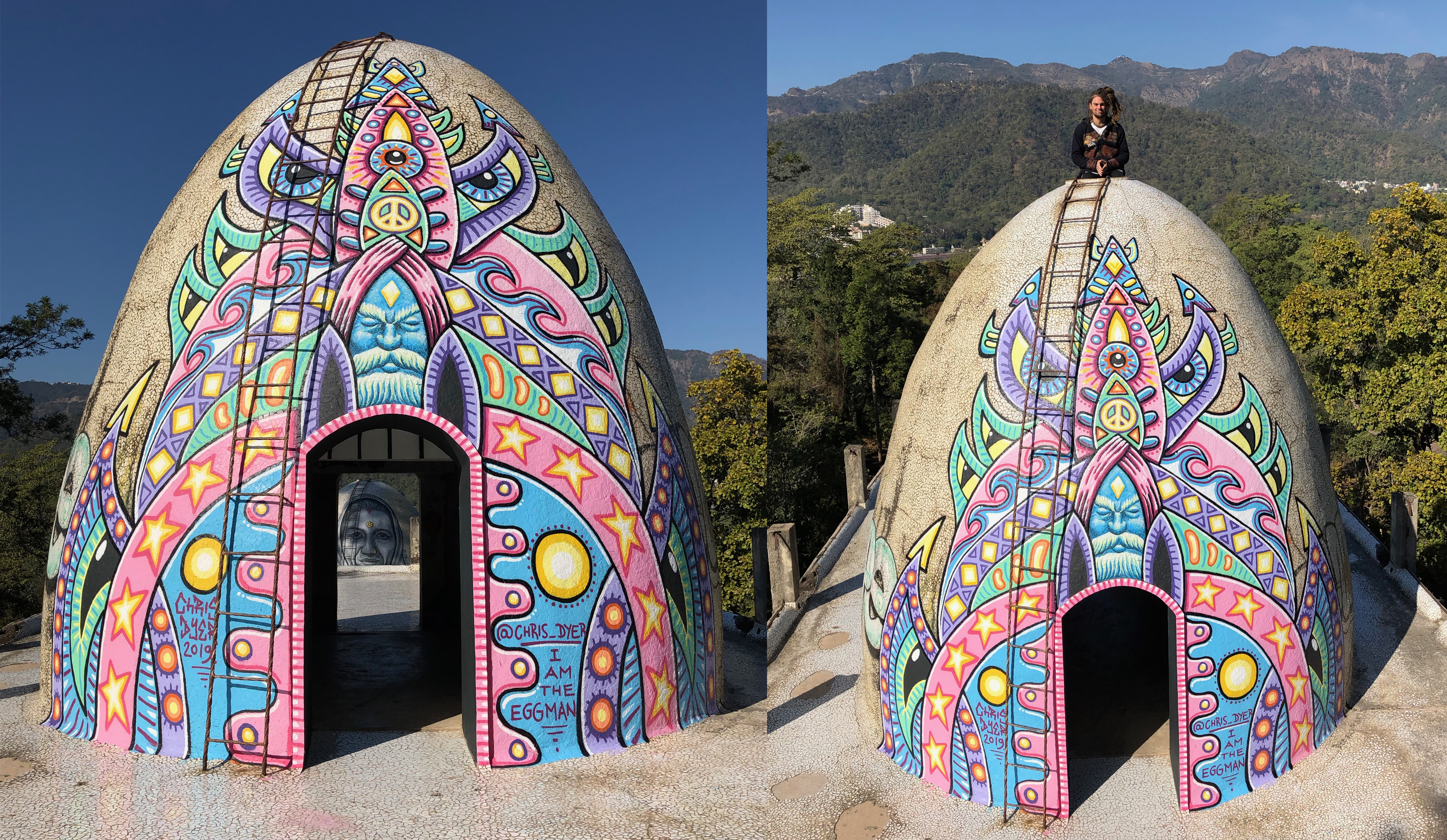
I am the Eggman, Beatles Ashram, Rishikesh, India

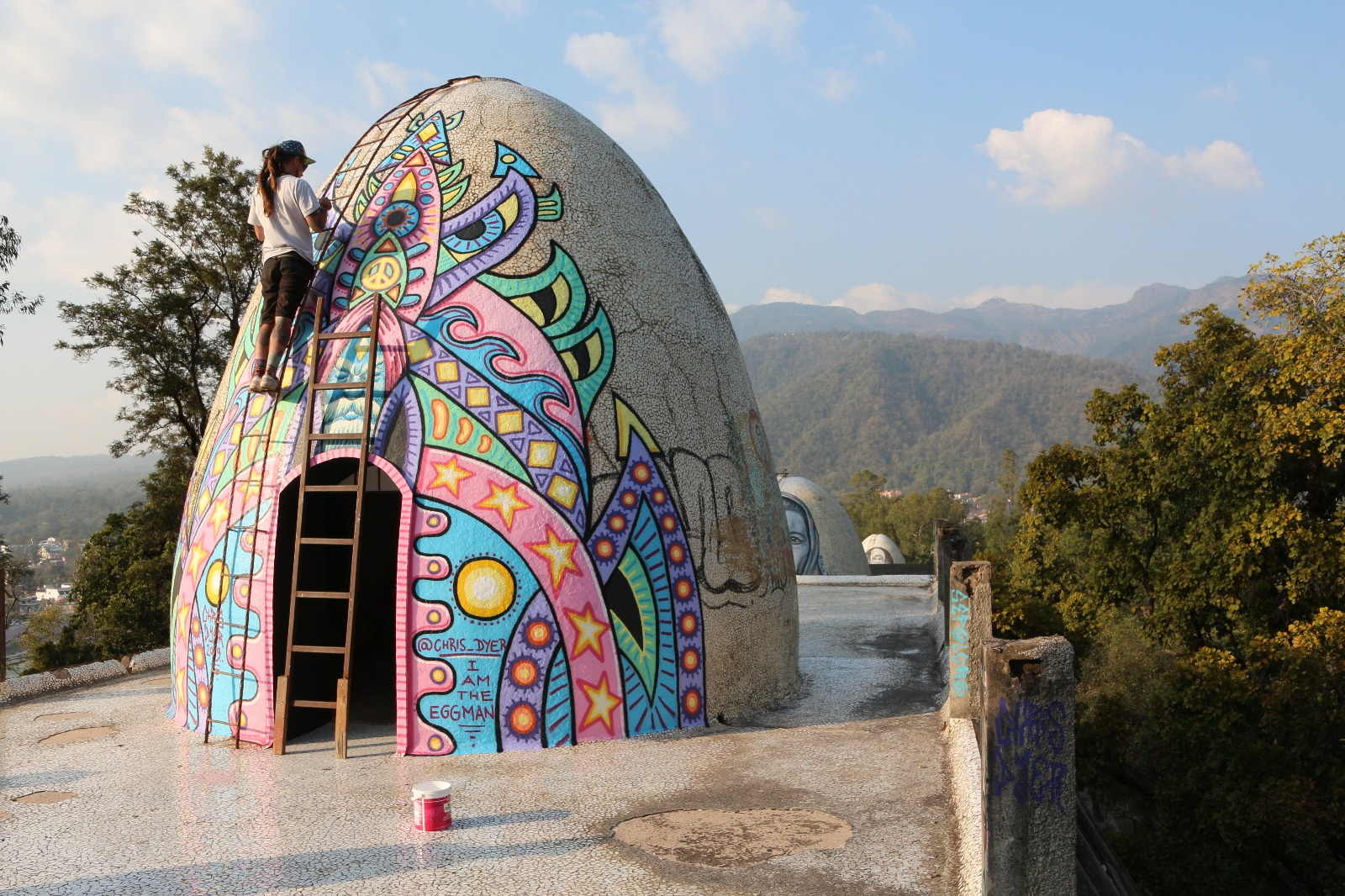
Chris Dyer painting his I am the Eggman Beatles Ashram Mural

He has created artwork for CD album covers or concert posters for musicians such as Ott, String Cheese Incident, Third World, 12th Planet, The Gaslamp Killer, and more. Additionally, he has live-painted for musical artists such as Diplo, Tipper, Immortal Technique, Nahko Bear, Cut Chemist and many others.

=== Skate art ===
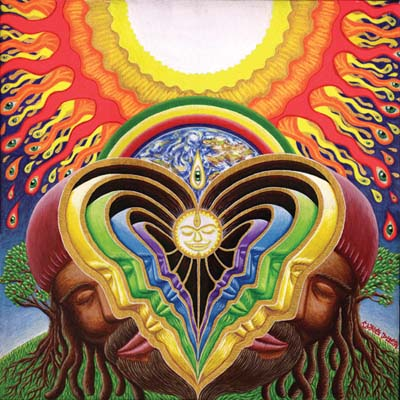
Peeling Bodies

Dyer started skateboarding on Christmas of 1986 and still does today. It was in the year 2000 when he started doing his paintings on broken skateboards he had ridden and collected over the years. His recycled skate paintings introduced his work to skateboarders around the world, mostly via skate magazines articles. In 2004, he started creating skate graphics for Creation Skateboards, from San Francisco, who had him over in California for many years. By 2011 Dyer he had become the company's Art Director and Brand Manager, as which he created catalogs and directed the skate video "Soul Harmonics".

=== Street art ===
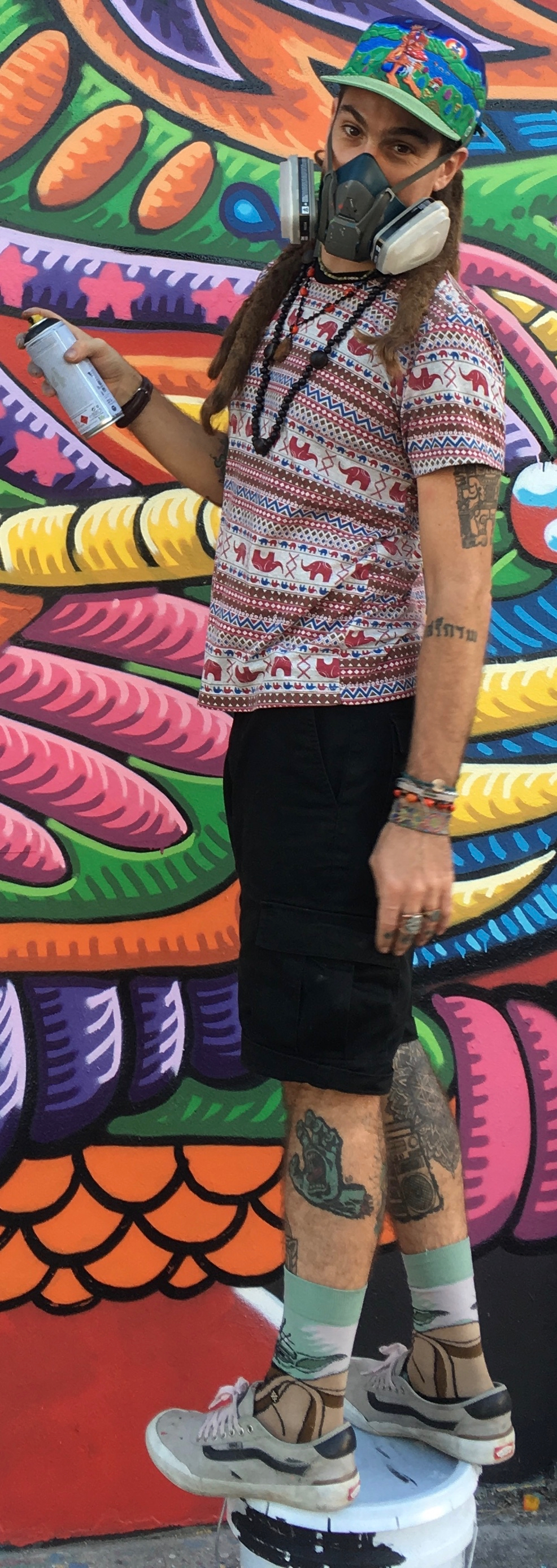
Dyer in front of Art Basel Miami Mural 2018

Dyer's first interaction with aerosols was in 1993, when he would tag many walls of Lima, Peru, publicizing the name of the Sepulcro Crema street gang he belonged to. Dyer's younger brother later started doing graffiti, so Chris stayed away from that medium for many years, as to avoid brotherly competition. It was later in 2007, when the brothers became roommates in Montreal, that they started to jam in their backyard and Chris got addicted to that medium. These days, spray paint is one of Chris' main mediums, especially in the outdoor seasons and while on the road. His intentions are to beautify the world and leave his trace as he explores the globe.

== Publications ==
- 2006 – Pipe Fiends (Media Mudscout) ISBN 0-9739550-4-X
- 2007 – Concrete 2 Canvas More Skateboarders' Art (Laurence King Publishing Ltd) ISBN 978-1-85669-531-2
- 2008 – Drawgasmic (Cranky Yellow Publishing)
- 2008 – The Sunlight Chronicles (Divine Life Publishing LLC) ISBN 978-0-615-249-68-1
- 2010 – Featured in Maple Vedas by K. Gandhar Chakravarty (8th House Publishing) ISBN 978-1-926716-05-3
- 2010 – Visionary Art Yearbook (Blurb Creative Publishing)
- 2011 – Positive Creations (Schiffer Publishing Ltd.) ISBN 978-0-7643-3913-4
- 2012 – Divining the Dream ISBN 9782953458114.
- 2015 – Arte Visionaria (Prismas Editoria) ISBN 978-85-68274-76-7
- 2016 – Chris Dyer's Kick-Ass Coloring Book by Chris Dyer (Last Gasp of San Francisco) ISBN 978-0-86719-823-2
- 2018 – Street Art Themes et Motifs by Pierre Toromanoff (Fancy Books) ISBN 979-10-97493-03-5
- 2018 – The New Psychedelic Revolution" by James Oroc (Park Street Press) ISBN 9781620556627
- 2018 – Feminine Mysticism in Arts: Artists Envisioning the Divine by Victoria Christian and Susan Steadman (Awakening Soul Wisdom) ISBN 978-1-7326924-1-1
- 2018 – Painted Walls La Habana by Amir Saarony (Old Cuban Cigar Stuff) ISBN 978-1-988820-53-8
- 2019 – Thrasher Magazine's Mail Drop Book – 38 Years of Envelope Art (Generic Publishing) ASIN B081W4GKH4
