= Klughaus Gallery =

American art gallery in New York City

Coordinates: 40.711991°N 73.994443°W

Klughaus Gallery is an art gallery and agency based in New York City that exhibits and represents artists with roots in graffiti and street culture.

== History ==
Klughaus opened as a brick in mortar gallery space at 47 Monroe Street in the Two Bridges neighborhood of Manhattan in December 2011, leading off with the “Home for the Holidays” exhibition, which included works by artists Faust and Katsu. The showroom was described as “steeped in downtown aesthetic of urban graffiti culture”. Klughaus launched dozens of exhibits, pop up shops, interactive installations, and various other events that earned the gallery such praise as “One of the coolest spots in Manhattan’s Lower East Side…” and one of the “Top 10 Most Important Graffiti Moments of 2012”.

In addition to other major shows around the US, Klughaus held exhibits at Miami Art Basel in both 2012 and 2013.

In 2014, Klughaus arranged for a mural to be painted on a "Graffiti Free NYC" wall at 1 Allen Street in Chinatown, enlisting DCEVE and Smart Crew for the postcard like "Greetings from Chinatown" piece.

Klughaus artists include Ricky Powell.
