= 123Klan =

Bears by 123Klan

123Klan is a French graffiti crew, founded in 1992 by husband and wife Scien and Klor. Since 1994 the crew have also worked in graphic design, inspired by the work of Neville Brody, and started to apply it to their graffiti (and vice versa). They describe their art as 'when street knowledge meets technology and graffiti melds with graphic design'. Dean, Sper, Skam, Meric, and Reso 1 are the other crew members.

Now based in Montreal, Canada, 123Klan's studio specializes in character illustration, branding and toy design.

They have had exhibitions worldwide, including Lille, Dunkirk, Toulouse, Strasbourg, Paris, Brussels, London, Eindhoven, Rome, Munich, Barcelona, New York City, Singapore, and Zürich.

== Published works ==
- 123Klan, Pyramyd, Paris, 2003, ISBN 2-910565-58-0
- 123KLAN, version 2, Design Designer, Pyramyd editions, 2007, ISBN 978-2-35017-057-2
- Style is the Message, 123klan, 2003
- 123KLAN respect and loved, Ankama Editions, Label 619, 2013, ISBN 978-2-35910-450-9
