= List of Creative Capital grant recipients =

This is a list of Creative Capital grant recipients, or people who have received a grant from the nonprofit arts funder Creative Capital. It is sorted by year in reverse chronological order.

== 2021 ==
=== Moving image ===
- Suha Araj
- Shirley Bruno
- William D. Caballero
- Reid Davenport
- Amaryllis DeJesus Moleski, Terence Nance
- Crystal Kayiza
- Adam Khalil, Bayley Sweitzer
- Jenny Lion
- Jules Rosskam
- Elaine McMillion Sheldon
- Débora Souza Silva
- Martine Syms

=== Socially-Engaged Art ===
- Sita Kuratomi Bhaumik, Jocelyn Jackson, Saqib Keval
- Joseph Cuillier III, Shani Peters
- Sherrill Roland
- Bayeté Ross Smith
- Anna Tsouhlarakis
- Jordan Weber
- Shana M. Griffin

=== Technology ===
- Wafaa Bilal
- Lars Jan

Literature

- Anne Finger
- Mitchell S. Jackson
- Meng Jin
- Sabrina Orah Mark
- Marc Anthony Richardson
- Simone White
- Legacy Russell

=== Performing Arts ===
- Marie Lorenz, Kurt Rohde, Dana Spiotta
- Derek McPhatter
- Julian Terrell Otis
- Will Rawls
- Tomeka Reid

Visual Arts

- Sandy Rodriguez
- Jessica Vaughn

== 2020 ==
=== Literature ===
- Lady Dane Figueroa Edidi, J Mase III
- Wendy Walters
- Marcia Douglas
- Randa Jarrar
- Tonya Foster
- Kamau Patton
- Mark Nowak

=== Performing Arts ===
- Becca Blackwell
- Dorian Wood
- Estrellx supernova
- Eisa Davis
- Yahdon Israel, Tyehimba Jess, Janice A. Lowe
- Papel Machete
- Nia Witherspoon
- Jawwaad Taylor
- Jumatatu m. Poe
- Jibz Cameron, Sue Slagle
- Ebony Noelle Golden

=== Visual Arts ===
- Mercedes Dorame
- Jesse Krimes
- John W. Love Jr
- Steffani Jemison
- Jarett Mellenbruch

=== Moving Image ===
- Stephanie Wang-Breal
- Nikyatu Jusu
- Jasmin Mara López
- Diane Paragas
- Rodrigo Reyes

=== Socially-Engaged Art ===
- Jackie sumell
- Cannupa Hanska Luger

=== Technology ===
- Angela Washko
- Nathan Shafer
- Amitis Motevalli
- Tamara Shogaolu

== 2019 ==
=== Visual Arts ===
- Alison O’Daniel
- Karina Aguilera Skvirsky
- Alan Ruiz
- Nathaniel Corum & Joseph Kunkel
- Polly Apfelbaum
- MAOF
- Alejandro Durán
- Allison Janae Hamilton
- Bahar Behbahani

=== Literature ===
- Elissa Washuta
- Maaza Mengiste
- Joanna Fateman
- C. A. Conrad

=== Moving Image ===
- Nomi Talisman & Dee Hibbert-Jones
- Ramona S. Diaz
- Michael Premo
- Wes Hurley
- Kathryn Ramey
- Todd Chandler
- Daresha Kyi
- Ja’Tovia Gary
- S. Leo Chiang
- Kia LaBeija & Taina Larot
- Michelle Handelman
- Leslie Tai

=== Performing Arts ===
- Alice Sheppard
- Martha Redbone & Aaron Whitby
- Ni’Ja Whitson
- Charlotte Brathwaite
- Meshell Ndegeocello
- Linda Parris-Bailey
- Samora Pinderhughes
- Paul S Flores, Yosvany Terry & Rosalba Rolon
- Shontina Vernon
- Cristal Chanelle Truscott
- Larissa FastHorse
- Raja Feather Kelly
- Lauren McCarthy

=== Emerging Fields ===
- Stephanie Dinkins
- Jen Liu
- Brandon Ballengée
- Ekene Ijeoma
- Sharita Towne & Lisa K. Bates (since split)
- Victor Payan & Sandra Pocha Peña
- Niv Acosta
- Michele Stephenson
- Caleb Duarte
- Garrett Bradley
- Laura Doggett
- Elissa Moorhead

== 2016 ==
=== Emerging Fields ===
- Tanya Aguiñiga
- Zach Blas
- Peter Burr and Porpentine
- Melanie Crean, Shaun Leonardo and Sable Elyse Smith
- desert ArtLAB (April Bojorquez and Matt Garcia)
- Heather Dewey-Hagborg
- Liz Glynn
- Heather Hart and Jina Valentine
- Marisa Morán Jahn
- KCHUNG
- Yotam Mann
- Eva and Franco Mattes
- Irvin Morazan
- Laura Parnes
- Kenya (Robinson)
- Evan Roth
- Chris E. Vargas

=== Literature ===
- Jesse Ball
- Desveladas (Macarena Hernández, Sheila Maldonado, Nelly Rosario)
- LaTasha N. Nevada Diggs
- Percival Everett
- Eileen Myles
- Dao Strom

=== Performing Arts ===
- Cornell Alston and Kaneza Schaal
- Jeff Becker
- Peter Born and Okwui Okpokwasili
- Ligia Bouton, Matt Donovan and Lei Liang
- Sharon Bridgforth
- Ben Thorp Brown
- Ann Carlson
- Mallory Catlett
- Ellen Sebastian Chang and Amara Tabor-Smith
- Jim Findlay
- Robin Frohardt
- Sean Graney
- Brian Harnetty
- Branden Jacobs-Jenkins and Carmelita Tropicana
- Joseph Keckler
- Heather Kravas
- Ahamefule J. Oluo
- Pegasus Warning (Guillermo E. Brown)
- Graham Reynolds
- Royal Osiris Karaoke Ensemble (Tei Blow and Sean McElroy)
- James Scruggs
- Erika Chong Shuch
- Yara Travieso

== 2015 ==
=== Moving Image ===
- Michael Almereyda
- Martha Colburn
- Cherien Dabis
- Christopher Harris
- Lauren Kelley
- Maryam Keshavarz
- Klip Collective (Josh James and Ricardo Rivera)
- Andy Kropa
- Lily & Honglei
- Shola Lynch
- Jeff Malmberg and Chris Shellen
- Jillian Mayer and Lucas Leyva (Mayer\Leyva)
- Lotfy Nathan
- Pat O'Neill
- Carlo Ontal
- Lorelei Pepi
- Shawn Peters
- Jennifer Reeder
- Jon Rubin
- Ry Russo-Young
- Lee Anne Schmitt
- Dan Schneidkraut
- Travis Wilkerson

=== Visual Arts ===
- A.K. Burns
- Heather Cassils
- Carolina Caycedo
- Mike Crane
- Danielle Dean
- Abigail DeVille
- Maria Gaspar
- Mariam Ghani
- Eric Gottesman
- Titus Kaphar
- Jon Kessler
- Narcissister
- Brittany Nelson
- Lorraine O'Grady
- Jeanine Oleson
- Gala Porras-Kim
- Beatriz Santiago Muñoz
- Carrie Schneider
- Anna Sew Hoy
- Amie Siegel
- Katrin Sigurdardottir
- Wu Tsang
- Ivan Velez

== 2013 ==
=== Emerging Fields ===
- Juan William Chávez,
- Julia Christensen
- Design 99 (Mitch Cope & Gina Reichert)
- Fallen Fruit (David Burns, Matias Viegener & Austin Young)
- Ghana Think Tank (John Ewing, Maria del Carmen Montoya & Christopher Robbins)
- Nick Hallett & Shana Moulton
- Natalie Jeremijenko
- Maryam Keshavarz & Roya Rastegar
- Ali Momeni
- Laurie Jo Reynolds
- Susan Robb
- Chemi Rosado-Seijo
- Steve Rowell
- Gregory Sale
- Miriam Simun
- Elaine Tin Nyo
- Quintan Ana Wikswo

=== Literature ===
- Jessica Anthony
- Jen Bervin
- John McManus
- Maggie Nelson
- Srikanth Reddy
- Sharifa Rhodes-Pitts

=== Performing Arts ===
- Kyle Abraham
- luciana achugar
- Jesse Bonnell
- Taylor Ho Bynum
- Wally Cardona
- Jace Clayton
- Complex Movements (Carlos Garcia, Invincible, Wesley Taylor & Waajeed)
- Corey Dargel & Honor Molloy
- Degenerate Art Ensemble (Joshua Kohl & Haruko Nishimura)
- DD Dorvillier
- Faye Driscoll
- Michelle Ellsworth
- Trajal Harrell
- Emily Johnson
- Dohee Lee
- Miwa Matreyek
- Neal Medlyn
- Mondo Bizarro (Millicent Johnnie, Sean LaRocca & Nick Slie)
- Queen GodIs & Makeda Thomas
- The TEAM (Jessica Almasy, Rachel Chavkin, Matt Hubbs & Libby King)
- Arturo Vidich & Daniel Wendlek
- Wakka Wakka Productions (Gabrielle Brechner, Kirjan Waage & Gwendolyn Warnock)
- Holcombe Waller

== 2012 ==
=== Film/Video ===
- Cam Archer
- Robert Bahar & Almudena Carracedo
- Amy Belk & Matt Porterfield
- Brad Butler
- Lucien Castaing-Taylor & Véréna Paravel
- Eric Dyer
- Daniel Eisenberg
- Yance Ford
- Brian L. Frye & Penny Lane
- Sonali Gulati
- Kenneth Jacobs
- Nina Menkes
- Akosua Adoma Owusu
- Brian Pera
- Rick Prelinger
- Michael Robinson
- Mark Elijah Rosenberg
- Norbert Shieh
- Stacey Steers
- Deborah Stratman
- Jesse Sugarmann
- Christopher Sullivan
- Jake Yuzna

=== Visual Arts ===
- Janine Antoni
- Patty Chang
- LaToya Ruby Frazier
- Theaster Gates
- Ken Gonzales-Day
- Taraneh Hemami
- Tahir Hemphill
- Simone Leigh
- Eric Leshinsky & Zach Moser
- Phillip Andrew Lewis
- Carlos Motta
- My Barbarian (Malik Gaines, Jade Gordon & Alexandro Segade)
- Postcommodity (Raven Chacon) & Nathan Young)
- The Propeller Group (Matt Lucero & Tuan Andrew Nguyen)
- Teri Rofkar
- Paul Rucker
- Connie Samaras
- Lisa Sigal
- Jim Skuldt
- Kerry Tribe
- Joan Waltemath
- Women (Scott Barry & Neil Doshi)
- Amy Yao

== 2009 ==
=== Emerging Fields ===
- Matthew Coolidge, Center for Land Use Interpretation
- Cesar Cornejo
- James Coupe
- Beatriz da Costa
- eteam
- Futurefarmers
- Catherine Herdlick
- Shih Chieh Huang
- Lisa Jevbratt
- Jae Rhim Lee
- neuroTransmitter
- Richard Pell
- Stephanie Rothenberg
- Mark Shepard
- Karolina Sobecka
- Sam Van Aken

=== Innovative Literature ===
- Paul Beatty
- Kenny Fries
- Ben Marcus
- Bernadette Mayer
- Rebecca Solnit
- Deb Olin Unferth

=== Performing Arts ===
- Byron Au Yong and Aaron Jafferis
- Victor D. Cartagena, Roberto Gutierrez Varea, Violeta Luna, David Molina and Antigone Trimis
- Nora Chipaumire
- Steve Cuiffo, Trey Lyford and Geoffrey Sobelle
- Lisa D’Amour and Katie Pearl
- Chris M. Green
- Miguel Gutierrez
- Robert Farid Karimi
- Zoe Keating and Jeffrey Rusch
- Heidi Latsky Dance
- Young Jean Lee
- Los Angeles Poverty Department
- Taylor Mac
- Barak Marshall, Tamir Muskat, and Margalit Oved
- David Neumann and Richard Sylvarnes
- Ken Nintzel
- Tere O’Connor
- Tommy Smith and Reggie Watts
- Deke Weaver

== 2008 ==
=== Film/Video ===
- Kenseth Armstead
- Anita Chang
- Erin Cosgrove
- Marshall Curry and Sam Cullman
- Rodney Evans
- Lynn Hershman Leeson
- Tia Lessin and Carl Deal
- Brad Lichtenstein and Vernon Reid
- Billy Luther
- Tara Mateik
- Cat Mazza
- Leighton Pierce
- Laura Poitras
- Anayansi Prado
- Jay Rosenblatt
- David Russo
- Luke Savisky
- Cauleen Smith
- Danial Sousa
- Banker White and Zach Niles
- Julie Wyman

=== Visual Arts ===
- Sanford Biggers
- Susan Brandt and Kristine Woods
- Kianga Ford
- Joseph Grigely
- Wayne Hodge
- Jennie C. Jones
- Kalup Linzy
- Naeem Mohaiemen
- Matthew Moore
- Otabenga Jones & Associates
- Angela Reginato
- Kaneem Smith
- Eve Sussman
- SuttonBeresCuller
- Mark Tribe
- Trimpin
- Lauren Woods
- Mario Ybarra Jr.
- Bruce Yonemoto and Juli Carson
- Emna Zghal and Michael Rakowitz

== 2006 ==
=== Emerging Fields ===
- Cory Arcangel
- Luca Buvoli
- REDUX CALLSPACE
- Laura Carton
- Brody Condon
- Hassan Elahi
- MTAA + RSG
- Auriea Harvey (Tale of Tales)
- Kenjji
- Amelia Kirby
- Kito Jumanne-Marshall
- Brian Knep
- Golan Levin
- Jane Marsching
- Sheryl Oring
- Donna Porterfield
- Jakub Segen
- Nick Szuberla
- Marek Walczak
- Martin Wattenberg

=== Digital Arts ===
- Paul Vanouse
- Stephen Vitiello
- Allison Wiese

=== Literature ===
- Jeffrey Allen
- Alan Gilbert
- Christian Hawkey
- Cole Swenson

=== Performing Arts ===
- Mason Bates & Anne Patterson
- Lisa Bielawa
- Michael Bryant, Grisha Coleman, Jesse Gilbert, John Oduroe, & Robert Peagler
- Rude Mechanicals
- Radiohole
- Danny Hoch
- Joan Jeanrenaud & Alessandro Moruzzi
- Marc Bamuthi Joseph
- Gulgun Kayim
- Locust
- Ledoh Ledoh
- Mickle Maher
- Sarah Michelson
- Bebe Miller
- David Rousseve
- Sophiline Shapiro
- Susan Simpson
- Tamango Van Cayseele
- Ricki Vincent
- Kristina Wong
- Nami Yamamoto

== 2005 ==
=== Visual Arts ===
- Edgar Arceneaux
- Olga Koumoundouros and Rodney McMillan
- James Bidgood
- Max King Cap
- Bruce Chao
- Liz Cohen
- Nancy Davidson
- Peggy Diggs
- Jeffrey Gibson
- Pablo Helguera
- Carolyn Lathan-Stiefel
- Deborah Lawrence
- Annie Han & Daniel Mihalyo
- Mark Newport
- Ruben Ochoa
- Karyn Olivier
- Susanne Cockrell and Ted Purves
- Artemio Rodriguez
- Joseph Schneider
- Kerry Skarbakka
- Noelle Tan

=== Video and Film ===
- Natalia Almada
- Usama Alshaibi
- Ina Archer
- Bill Daniel
- Paula Durette
- Edgar Endress & Lori Lee
- James Fotopoulos
- Jennifer Fox
- Jacqueline Goss
- Brent Green
- Christina Ibarra
- Braden King
- James Lyons
- Jake Mahaffy
- Peter Sillen
- Alex Stikich
- Naomi Uman
- Edin Velez
- Glenda Wharton
- Christopher Wilcha
- Eric Wolf

== 2002 ==
=== Performing Arts ===
- Homer Avila
- Sujata Bhatt
- Maureen Brennan, Ellen Baird, Kerry Lowe, and Ashley Smith
- Ronald K. Brown
- Nick Cave
- Joanna Haigood and Wayne Campbell
- Shelley Hirsch
- Dan Hurlin
- Vijay Iyer and Michael Ladd
- John Leanos
- James Luna
- Kari Margolis
- Bob Massey
- Cynthia Oliver
- Daniel Roumain
- Rafael Sanchez
- Andrew Simonet
- Donna Uchizono
- Victoria Vazquez
- Richard Winberg
- Yasuko Yokoshi
- Pamela Z

=== Emerging Fields ===
- Steven Badgett
- Cindy Bernard
- Sawad Brooks
- Tana Hargest
- Kelly Heaton
- Miranda July
- Eduardo Kac
- Heidi Kumao
- Steven Kurtz
- Suzanne Lacy
- George Legrady
- Sharon Lockhart
- Jennifer McCoy
- Mark Napier
- Sabrina Raaf
- Marie Sester
- Eddo Stern
- Faith Wilding

== 2001 ==
=== Media ===
- Steven Bognar
- Bill Brown
- Ellen Bruno
- Erica Cho
- Ricardo Dominguez
- James Duesing
- Kevin Everson
- Vicki Funari
- Joe Gibbons
- Sam Green
- Vanalyne Green
- Rachel Mayeri
- Leslie McCleave
- Jon Moritsugu
- Bill Morrison
- Suzan Pitt
- Reynold Reynolds
- Erik Saks
- Jeffrey Scher
- Elizabeth Subrin
- Chel White
- David Wilson
- Caveh Zahedi
- Marina Zurkow

=== Visual Arts ===
- Chris Burnett and Michael Rees
- Gaye Chan
- Mel Chin
- Elena del Rivero
- Sam Easterson
- Hirokazu Kosaka
- Catherine Lord
- Jeannette Louie
- Mary Lucier
- Beverly McIver
- Kay Miller
- Franco Mondini-Ruiz
- William Pope.L
- Dread Scott
- Paul Shambroom
- Arthur Simms
- Bentley Spang
- Christine Tarkowski
- Christine Yamamoto

== 2000 ==
=== Emerging Fields ===
- Betty Beaumont
- Natalie Bookchin
- Josely Carvalho
- Maya Sara Churi
- Patrick Clancy
- Alison Cornyn
- Leah Gilliam
- Jessica Irish
- Prema Murthy
- John Simon Jr.
- Ray Thomas
- Helen Thorington

=== Media ===
- Peggy Ahwesh
- Craig Baldwin
- Roddy Bogawa
- Portia Cobb
- Adam Cohen
- Jem Cohen
- Todd Downing
- Sandi DuBowski
- Jeanne Finley
- Barbara Hammer
- Jon Jolles
- Lewis Klahr
- Chris Munch
- Spencer Nakasako
- Diane Nerwen
- Joanna Priestley
- Scott Saunders
- Philip Solomon
- T. Tran
- Ela Troyano

=== Performance ===
- Djola Branner
- Jane Comfort
- Fred Curchack
- Brian Freeman
- Janie Geiser
- Joe Goode
- David Hancock
- Rennie Harris
- Jon Jang
- John Jasperse
- Daniel Alexander Jones
- Lisa Kron
- Ralph Lemon
- Richard Maxwell
- Meredith Monk
- Jennifer Monson
- Tracie Morris
- Jarrad Powell
- Amelia Rudolph
- Carl Hancock Rux
- Elizabeth Streb
- Sekou Sundiata
- Basil Twist

=== Visual Arts ===
- Xenobia Bailey
- Conrad Bakker
- Erika Blumenfeld
- Tony Cokes
- Chris Doyle
- Matthew Geller
- Maria Elena Gonzalez
- Fred Holland
- Martha Jackson-Jarvis
- Wendy Jacob
- Shannon Kennedy
- Zoe Leonard
- Zhi Lin
- Jyung Park
- Alex Rivera
- Jason Salavon
- Joseph Scanlan
- Sue Schaffner
- Mary Ellen Strom
- Mel Ziegler

== See also ==
- Creative Capital
