= The Art Assignment =

Web series (2014–2020)

- Genre: Humanities/Education
- Directed by: Mark Olsen
- Presented by: Sarah Urist Green; John Green
- Country of origin: United States
- Original language: English

Production
- Producers: Complexly; PBS Digital Studios
- Production locations: Indianapolis, Indiana
- Editor: Brandon Brungard

Original release
- Release: February 20, 2014

The Art Assignment is a PBS Digital Studios webseries focused on contemporary art that debuted in February 2014. The Art Assignment is hosted by Sarah Urist Green who was a curator of contemporary art for the Indianapolis Museum of Art from 2007 to 2013.

Green's goal for this web series is to demystify the art making process and educate people on contemporary art and how it can be “accessible and social, rather than distant or intimidating”. Green travels the United States to meet and talk with various artists about their art; the artists then give an "assignment" to the audience. The series teaches its audience about contemporary art while providing historical context for the art. The audience is asked to participate by completing the "assignments" and continuing the conversation about art in the comments and on social media. The artists included in the series explore art history through the lens of the present with framing by Green. These artists include: Jesse Sugarmann, Alex Soth, Sonja Clark, Hope Ginsburg, Maria Gaspar, Molly Springfield, Michelle Grabner, Kim Beck, Jon Rubin, Jonn Herschend & Will Rogan, Allison Smith, Tameka Norris, Lee Boroson, Nina Katchadourian, Kate Gilmore, and Deb Sokolow.

Green's husband John Green is executive producer of the series.

== Assignment episodes ==
There are over 50 videos in the Assignment Episodes playlist, and each one features one or more artists, their styles, and a brief biography of how they developed their particular aesthetic. Their assignments relate to either their style or a valuable topic to them. Each video features a clip called "Who's Done Stuff Like This Before" to examine the art history behind the ideas the contemporary artists present. The audience sees what the artists did as their assignment, from the methodology to the execution and final result. The artists often reflect on their choices and the trial and error process in the project. The final step in each assignment is to document the experience in any form, and upload it to any form of social media with the hashtag #TheArtAssignment, and it could be featured in the show.

=== Assignments ===
Episode 1: Meet in the Middle with Douglas Paulson and Christopher Robbins

The first official Assignment in which Sarah Urist Green and John Green introduce artists Douglas Paulson and Christopher Robbins. The two artists have collaborated in the past, and the video mentions their previous work and how they met personally. The instructions are to pick a friend, and calculate the exact midpoint between the two participants. After participants decide on a date and time to meet, they don't communicate until then, and document the experience using any medium of their choice.

Episode 2: Stakeout! with Deb Sokolow

Green talks with the Chicago-based artist Deb Sokolow about her style and how she developed it over time. Her pieces are huge and layered with text, images, and diagrams to tangle and de-tangle stories. This assignment plays with the relationship between the observer and the observed. The instructions are to find an object, place it in a public spot so strangers can interact with it, and pick a location to observe. Similar to the first episode, people record their observations using any medium of their choice.

== The Case For ==
This video series features various artists and art movements and delves into the impact and value they have in history. The narrator includes how the style of a movement or individual creators began and the following positive and negative reception. This segment covers artists from both past and present stemming from various ethnicities and nationalities. The videos cover a wide range of mediums, and the playlist includes minimalism, abstraction, and performance art and highlights creative minds such as Andy Warhol, Mark Rothko, Kanye West, Yoko Ono, and Ai Weiwei.

== Art Trip ==
Another playlist called Art Trip delves into the art history and culture in cities around the world. Currently the Art Assignment team has visited London, Tijuana, Los Angeles, Richmond, Washington D.C., the Twin Cities, and Chicago. The videos overview many national and local museums, current exhibits, and local artists.

== We Think Art is Interesting ==
This playlist is a collection of miscellaneous topics and behind the scenes videos. Some deconstruct a bit of the mystery within the art world such as "What's a Curator?" and "How to Learn About Contemporary Art" while others give tips for art assignments and showcase a variety of artists like "Fierce Women of Art 1".

== Artline ==
This segment has an "art hotline" with an actual phone so viewers can call in their questions about art. The number is 901-602-ARTY (2789). The questions range from personal advice to opinions on current issues in the art world and much more.

== Reception ==
There are 24 assignment response videos which can feature over a hundred creations per video. The Phoenix New Times and Indianapolis Star both covered the show after the first episode aired on February 20, 2014. Despite its birth on the internet, The Art Assignment made it into real life with a physical exhibit in August 2016 that NUVO reviewed. It featured the work of three Indianapolis artists – Brian McCutcheon, Nathaniel Russel, and Lauren Zoll – who have previously given out assignments.
