= Michael Robinson =

Michael or Mike Robinson may refer to:

== Arts and humanities ==
- Michael Robinson (Canadian artist) (1948–2010), poet and printmaker
- Michael F. Robinson (1933–2026), English composer and musicologist
- Michael Massey Robinson (1744–1826), poet
- Michael S. Robinson (1910–1999), British art historian
- Michael Eric Robinson (born 1956), American composer

== Sports ==
=== American football ===
- Michael Robinson (cornerback) (born 1973), NFL player for the Green Bay Packers in 1996
- Michael Robinson (fullback) (born 1983), NFL player for the Seattle Seahawks from 2010 to 2013
- Michael Robinson (arena football) (born 1986), AFL player for the Kansas City Command
- Mike Robinson (defensive end) (1956–2022), NFL player for the Cleveland Browns in 1981 & 1982

=== Association football (soccer) ===
- Michael Robinson (footballer) (1958–2020), Irish footballer from 1975 to 1989, television pundit in Spain thereafter
- Mike Robinson (soccer) (1958–2021), American soccer forward
- Mike Robinson (footballer, born 1968) (born 1968), English footballer for Darlington

=== Other sports ===
- Michael Robinson (figure skater), British figure skater
- Michael Robinson (cricketer) (born 1967), Australian cricketer
- Mike Robinson (basketball, born 1976), American basketball player
- Mike Robinson (basketball, born 1952), American basketball player, winner of the Frances Pomeroy Naismith Award

== Other people ==
- Michael Robinson (rabbi) (1924–2006), activist for civil and human rights
- Michael Robinson (RAF officer) (1917–1942), British flying ace of the Royal Air Force during the Second World War
- Michael H. Robinson (1929–2008), British zoologist
- Mike Robinson (designer) (born 1956), American automobile designer
- Michael Waller Robinson (1837–1912), American politician
- Mike Robinson (Alberta politician), Alberta Liberal Party politician and former president & CEO of Glenbow Museum
- Mike Robinson (businessman), founder and president of Eastwood Guitars
