= Tsarkov =

Tsarkov (Russian: Царьков) is a family name of Russian origin.

Notable people with the name include:

- Oleh Tsarkov (born 1988), Ukrainian Olympic sports shooter
- Yevgen Tsarkov (born 1974), Ukrainian politician
- Fyodor Tsarkov (1888–1938), Russian member of the 16th Congress Central Committee
- Pyotr Tsarkaov, Russian member of the Russian Opposition Coordination Council in 2012
- Vladimir Tsarkov (born 1933), Russian commander in the 21st Air Defence Corps who ordered Korean Air Lines Flight 902 shot down
- Yawhen Tsarkov, Belarusian footballer in the 1998 Russian Second Division
- Vasiliy Tsarkov, Russian mixed martial artist competing in the 2010 Fight Nights Global
- Vladimir Tsarkov, Russian circus performer of Valentin Gneushev’s “The Red Harlequin”

== See also ==
- Tarkovsky (surname) (including a list of people with the name)
