= Tarkowski =

Tarkowski (feminine: Tarkowska; plural: Tarkowscy) is a Polish surname. Notable people with this surname include:

- Andrzej Tarkowski (1933–2016), Polish embryologist
- Christine Tarkowski (born 1967), American sculptor
- Daniela Tarkowska (born 1946), Polish javelin thrower
- James Tarkowski (born 1992), English footballer
- Piotr Tarkowski (born 1999), Polish long jumper

== See also ==
- Tarkovsky (surname)
