= Skvirsky =

Skvirsky may refer to:

== People ==
- Karina Aguilera Skvirsky, American artist
- Lev Skvirsky (1903–1990), Soviet military leader

== Other uses ==
- Skvirsky Uyezd, subdivision in the Russian Empire
