= Michelle Ellsworth =

American dancer and performance artist

Michelle Ellsworth is an American dancer and performance artist, as well as a professor in the Department of Theatre and Dance at University of Colorado Boulder. Her "smart, singular" work spans live performance, video, performable websites, and drawing, employing absurdist humor, carpentry, technology, monologue, and dance. Ellsworth has received, among other awards, the Guggenheim Fellowship, the Doris Duke Impact Award, a Creative Capital Grant and a United States Artists Knight Fellowship. ArtForum has described her work as "some of the most engrossing explorations of how the body and technology coexist and collide."

Ellsworth has exhibited and performed at venues such as On The Boards (2004, 2005, 2012, 2015, 2019), Fusebox Festival (2013, 2015, 2019), American Realness (2015, 2018), Bard's Fisher Center for the Performing Arts (2017), Noorderzon Performing Arts Festival in Groningen, Netherlands (2016), Made in the U.S.A Festival at the Onassis Cultural Center in Athens, Greece (2016), Chocolate Factory Theatre in New York, NY (2015), Brown University (2011, 2015), Abandon Normal Devices Festival in Liverpool, UK (2013), Danspace (2012), DiverseWorks in Houston, TX (1996, 1997, 2001, 2005, 2009), and Dance Theatre Workshop in New York, NY (1992, 1993, 1996, 2007).

Some of Ellsworth's major works include Preparation for the Obsolescence of the Y Chromosome, TIFPRABAP.ORG, Phone Homer: Clytemnestra's Guide to Surveillance-Free Living, and Clytigation: State of Exception. Ellsworth has been dubbed "one of the most brilliant artists working today" and an "excellent comedian," one who "expertly folds nervousness into her character."

== Honors and awards ==
- Doris Duke Artist Award (2019)
- New England Foundation for the Arts (NEFA) National Dance Project Grant (2017)
- Guggenheim Fellowship (2016)
- Doris Duke Impact Award (2015)
- New England Foundation for the Arts (NEFA) National Dance Project Grant (2014)
- Creative Capital Grant (2013)
- United States Artists (USA) Knight Fellowship in Dance (2012)

== Notable works ==
=== Evidence of Labor: State of the Kitchen ===
Evidence of Labor was co-commissioned by the Experimental Media and Performing Arts Center (EMPAC) at Rensselaer Polytechnic and The Chocolate Factory (NYC) in 2023. Mobilizing choreography to surface labor concerns around generative AI tools, the work brings together inquiry into machine learning and maintenance art in collaboration with programmer Satchel Spencer. "Clever contraptions and artifacts are an Ellsworth hallmark," writes Siobhan Burke in The New York Times, "and the ones she has created here, with a team of collaborators, are as smart and delightful as ever."

=== Post-Verbal Social Network (PVSN) ===
Post-Verbal Social Network (PVSN) premiered at On the Boards in 2019, and consists of a set of digital and analogue prototypes for embodied communication. Through choreographic gestures and a range of experiments with media such as mechanical apparatuses, JavaScript, and Arduino, Ellsworth seeks alternatives to language and to mediated interaction.

=== The Rehearsal Artist ===
The Rehearsal Artist, described by Art in America's Sean J Patrick Carney as "an important work", is an intimate performance in which an audience of no more than eight at one time views choreography derived from the canon of social science experiments through a one-way mirror. A giant rotating wheel is revealed, along with other surprises, drawing the audience's attention to their shifting sense of stability, and to the act of watching itself. The work premiered at We're Watching Festival at the Bard Fisher Center for the Performing Arts in 2017.

=== Manpant Publishing ===
Manpant Publishing is a press founded by Ellsworth which uses a deliberately laborious printing process—the manual assembly of her dead father's pants into a typeface. The pants are placed, word by word, in a grassy clearing in Boulder, Colorado, while the process is recorded by and later harvested from a nearby weather camera. Manpant Publishing's publications so far include commissioned works by Thalia Field, Claudia La Rocco, Irene Vilar, Ann Waldman, and Julie Carr. Typesetters include Maya Livio, Anthony Alterio, Lauren Beale, Ondine Geary, and Brooke McNamara and the work is coded by Satchel Spencer. The Village Voice's Jennifer Krasinski called the piece "a most generous use of grief."

=== Clytigation: State of Exception ===
Clytigation: State of Exception was developed as a sequel to Ellsworth's Phone Homer, picking up after the famous murder. In it, Ellsworth speculates on devices which can mask her location and identity, such as an interpersonal drone. She considers the personal and social implications of war, relating Clytemnestra's story to her own experience after 9/11.

=== Phone Homer: Clytemnestra's Guide to Surveillance-Free Living ===
Phone Homer: Clytemnestra's Guide to Surveillance-Free Living reimagines the epic poem The Iliad by investigating the dynamics of being a “first lady.” For the work, Ellsworth developed a standalone internet, pre-recorded conversations, and other tools to imagine a life that is protected from surveillance and liberated from interpersonal drama. It premiered at the Made in the USA Festival at the Onassis Cultural Center in Athens, Greece in 2016.

=== Preparation for the Obsolescence of the Y Chromosome ===
Ellsworth's performance Preparation for the Obsolescence of the Y Chromosome considers how to brace for a world without men. By contemplating the passing of her father, alongside a 2003 article in which New York Times columnist Maureen Dowd posited that Y chromosome has been slowly declining in importance over millennia, Ellsworth created an "artistically wild, scientifically accurate movement/theater, performance piece." The work combines recent scientific research with personal narrative and absurd gestures, and opens with the statement "I don't mean to make trouble," to which critic Nancy Wozny writes in response, "Oh, yes you do, Ms. Ellsworth!"—pointing to the rebellious and irreverent perspective that energizes this piece and Ellsworth's body of work at large.

=== The Objectification of Things ===
The Objectification of Things is a performance which follows the life of a hamburger from birth to death and ultimately resurrection. Taking the attention away from humans and instead focusing on consumable things of the everyday, the work approaches serious issues such as climate change through the entry point of humor. The work weaves together dance, game shows, lectures, and scientific data and research.
