= Deb Sokolow =

American visual artist (born 1974)

Deb Sokolow (born 1974) is an American visual artist who lives and works in Chicago. Sokolow's work uses both image and text to conjure connections among historical events, celebrities, politicians, and her own personal history in order to spur new consideration of alternate possible realities. Her work has been exhibited widely and is part of a number of permanent collections, including the Hirshhorn Museum and Sculpture Garden, the Los Angeles County Museum of Art, Chicago's Museum of Contemporary Art, the Scottsdale Museum of Contemporary Art, and the Spertus Museum.

== Biography ==
Deb Sokolow was born in 1974. She moved from Davis, CA to attend the University of Illinois at Urbana / Champaign, where she earned a BFA in 1996. She attended the school of the Art Institute, receiving her MFA in 2004. She is associate professor of instruction, art theory and practice at Northwestern University in Evanston, IL, where she has worked since 2007.

=== Artwork ===
Sokolow has described her work as “Text-driven narrative drawings”. She has shown works large enough to take up the gallery wall, as well as smaller drawings on notebook-size paper, as well as editions of hand-made and limited-run books. Her work includes drawings resembling floor plans, architectural renderings, as well as portraiture.

Sokolow creates semi-fictitious narratives with drawing, collage and text which incorporate elements of history, politics, humor and the nefarious. Her large-scale installations, works on paper and panel, and artist books feature a nameless, paranoid narrator who uncovers sinister plots. Each piece includes writing which often present real people or real world scenarios, adding comical, fictional elements in order to invite the viewer to re-examine their own beliefs on a topic. Her work has covered many topics, including prominent or powerful men such as illusionist David Copperfield, drug lord Amado Carrillo Fuentes, Vladimir Putin, Frank Lloyd Wright, artist Willem De Kooning, and cult leader Jim Jones. She has used personal history as the starting point of compositions, as in the 2010 artist book, “Briefcase Exchange, Men’s Bathroom, McDonalds, Washington, D.C., 1986.” Sokolow populated a large 2010 piece called, “You tell people you're working really hard on things these days” with an imagined set of characters based on the real-life occupants of Sokolow's studio as well as the sculptor Richard Serra. Richard Serra had also appeared in a 2009 piece entitled, “Dear Trusted Associate,” in which Sokolow portrays a paranoid alternate reality in which the noted sculptor engages in criminal activity.

She often works with three distinct voices, which all interact and disagree with each other.

In 2003, during graduate school at the School of the Art Institute of Chicago, she had what she describes as an “art crisis,” when she “realized I didn’t know what the heck I was doing or wanted to do as an artist. I had no personal investment in anything going on in the studio, so I stopped making work.” She returned home, and spent time watching movies, notably Rocky (1976). In order to have work ready for an upcoming show, she created the piece “Rocky and Adrian (and Me).” The piece uses the tropes of a flowchart to analyze the love story between Stallone's character, the small-time thug and boxer Rocky Balboa, and Adrian Pennino, a shy pet shop clerk portrayed by Talia Shire. In addition to charting the relationship depicted in the film, Sokolow inserted references to herself in relation to Rocky. In a discussion about this piece, an art history professor commented that looking at her work was “like doing homework.” She has been expanding on this mode of making art ever since.

Someone Tell Mayor Daley, the Pirates are Coming is a single sheet of blue paper which maps out the narrator's suspicions that pirates have infiltrated your Chicago office. The narration is second person, and you suspect something is wrong when all of your co-workers are wearing bandannas and chunky gold earrings. As you delve further into the plot, you realize that the pirates are after Mayor Richard M. Daley's treasure buried at the former site of Meigs Field.

Her work has been written about in The New York Times, Artforum.com, Art in Print, and she is included in VITAMIN D2, a hardcover survey of contemporary drawing practices published by Phaidon. Podcast interviews include Tyler Green's Modern Art Notes Podcast and Bad at Sports. She is a 2010 resident of the Art Omi International Artists Residency and a 2012 recipient of an Artadia Chicago grant.

=== Awards ===
==== 2012 ====
Artadia Award (Chicago): The Fund for Art and Dialogue

Residency, Nordisk Kunstnarsenter Dalsåsen, Norwegian Ministry Of Culture, Norway

==== 2010 ====
International Artists Residency, Art Omi, Ghent, NY

==== 2009 ====
Works-in-Progress Residency, Museum of Contemporary Art, Chicago, IL

==== 2005 ====
Visual Arts Fellowship, Illinois Arts Council

=== Exhibitions ===
2023

Visualizing, Western Exhibitions, Chicago, IL (solo)

Chicago Architecture Biennial

==== 2020 ====
Loose History, Fine Art Gallery, University of Wisconsin-Parkside, Kenosha, WI (solo)

==== 2019 ====
Profiles in Leadership // Drawings without words, Western Exhibitions, Chicago, IL (solo)

2017

Deb Sokolow's archive of possibilities, curated by Kristin Korolowicz, The Stolbun Collection, Chicago, IL (solo)

Conspiracies, Minimalism, and the Philly Cheesesteak Sandwich: An Artist Book Retrospective from Deb (solo)

Sokolow. The Reading Room, Dallas, TX

The Presidents (some of them). Reilly Gallery, Providence College Galleries, RI (solo)

Deb Sokolow: Schematics, Surveillance, Murder, University Galleries, Illinois State University, Normal, IL (solo)

==== 2016 ====
Men, Western Exhibitions, Chicago, IL (solo)

Debate Stage Water Bottles, G Fine Arts, Washington, DC (solo)

Deb Sokolow for Syntax Season, PrintText, Indianapolis, IN (solo)

==== 2015 ====
Mr. F, Ski Club, Milwaukee, WI (solo)

==== 2014 ====
All Your Vulnerabilities Will Be Assessed, The University Galleries, Texas State University, San Marcos, TX (solo)

==== 2013 ====
Some concerns about the candidate / MATRIX 166, Wadsworth Atheneum, Hartford, CT (solo)

Western Exhibitions, Chicago, IL (solo)

==== 2012 ====
All Your Vulnerabilities Will Be Assessed, Moore College of Art, Philadelphia, PA (solo)

==== 2011 ====
Notes on Denver International Airport and the New World Order, Abrons Art Center, New York, NY (solo)

Drawings & Stories, Lawrence University, Appleton, WI (solo)

==== 2010 ====
Western Exhibitions, Chicago, IL (solo)

==== 2009 ====
Ground Level Projects: Deb Sokolow, Spertus Museum, Chicago, IL (solo)

==== 2008 ====
You are one step closer to learning the truth, Kemper Museum of Contemporary Art, Kansas City, MO (solo)

The trouble with people you don't know, Inova [Institute of Visual Arts], Milwaukee, WI (solo)

==== 2006 ====
Secrets and Lies and More Lies, 40000, Chicago, IL (solo)

==== 2005 ====
Someone tell Mayor Daley, the pirates are coming, Museum of Contemporary Art, Chicago (solo)
