= Douglas Paulson =

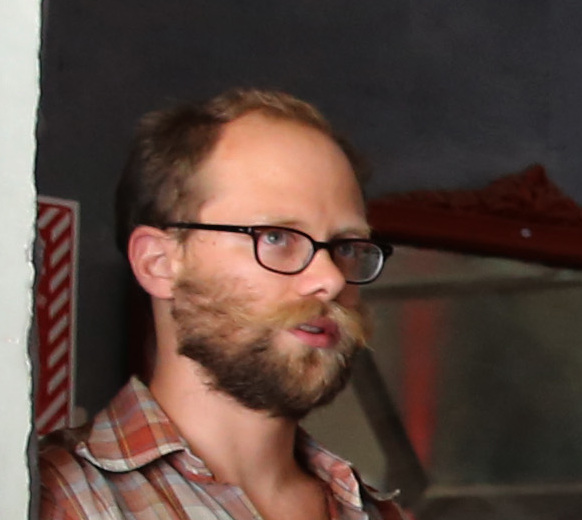
- Born: 1980 (age 45–46); Pennsylvania
- Website: http://www.douglaspaulson.com

Douglas Paulson (born 1980 in Pennsylvania) is an artist based in New York City.

He graduated from the Tyler School of Art with a B.F.A. in 2003. His work is often collaborative and interactive, falling into the new Social Practice stream of contemporary art. He has had continued collaborative practices with Parfyme, Rancourt/Yatsuk, Christopher Robbins, Eva la Cour, Ward Shelley, and Flux Factory, the latter being an arts collective and non-profit organization for which Douglas Paulson is an organizer, as well as forming impromptu "open" collectives focused on specific projects.

Douglas Paulson's practice is based on socially integrated response to context, responding to situations and venues on a project-by-project basis. This usually involved working with other artists and non-artists alike in a wide variety of collaborations, some of which have become recurring partnerships. His work at Flux Factory, an arts center whose mission itself it is to foster collaboration, is a form of sustained collaboration wherein Douglas Paulson helps run a collective environment, plan events and projects, and set up foundations for artists to collaborate.

== Projects ==
Douglas Paulson's most notable projects include:

- The Undiscovered Atoll of Flushtopia, at the invitation of the Queens Museum of Art in New York City where he, in turn, invited John Baca, Rachelle Beaudoin, Chris Domenick, Emcee C.M., Gisela Insuaste, Jacob Goble, Eva la Cour, Justin Rancourt, Christopher Robbins, Elizabeth Tubergen, Chuck Yatsuk. Together they dismantled a building that was part of the Worlds' Fair, and built eccentric islands with its remnants in Flushing Meadows park as a critique on the concept of utopia.
- The Harbor Project took place as part of the U-Turn Quadrennial in Copenhagen, Denmark with Parfyme. For six months, the artists created a community center at the harbor to encourage people to use Copenhagen's waterways. They offered paddle boats available for free, screened movies, created living spaces in "spandrels," and held message-in-a-bottle workshops for schoolchildren. They formed the "Adventure Squad," for which participants met to explore the city by water, and held public events such as concerts and intimate ones such as romantic dinners.
- Heaven Lost was part of a collaboration between Flux Factory, Urban Void, and other collectives at the invitation of the Athens Biennial, which was held in 2009 at the Olympic grounds of Faliro. The project consisted of an exploration of the Kifissos River and the Faliron Bay to which it empties unfiltered polluted waste. The river has been covered with a highway that has damaged the neighbourhood. Douglas Paulson along with his collaborators created walking and boat tours of the area.
- Tw**t the Police! is an ongoing online project on Twitter where people can report occurrences of the police breaking the law.
- The txt mstrpc lbry (pronounced text masterpiece library) is a growing collection of masterpieces of any media, translated into 'txt' message. People are invited to submit to the library as well as request from the growing list of its collection via text message.

== Display Locations ==
Douglas Paulson's work has been included in:

- The Sequences Festival
- P.S.1 Contemporary Art Center
- The Art Gallery of Saskatchewan
- Athens Biennial
- Noordkaap
- Queens Museum of Art
- Toronto Free Gallery
- UTURN Quadrennial
- Pancevo Biennail
- ABC No Rio
- Nikolaj Kunsthal
- Socrates Sculpture Park
- The Conflux Festival
- The Sculpture Center
- Dumbo Arts Center
- Kunsthallen Brandts
- Pierogi Gallery
- Museum Moderner Kunst
- Bonn Biennial
- Brooklyn Museum
- re-title
- MUÑOZ WAXMAN GALLERY
