= Steffani Jemison =

American artist

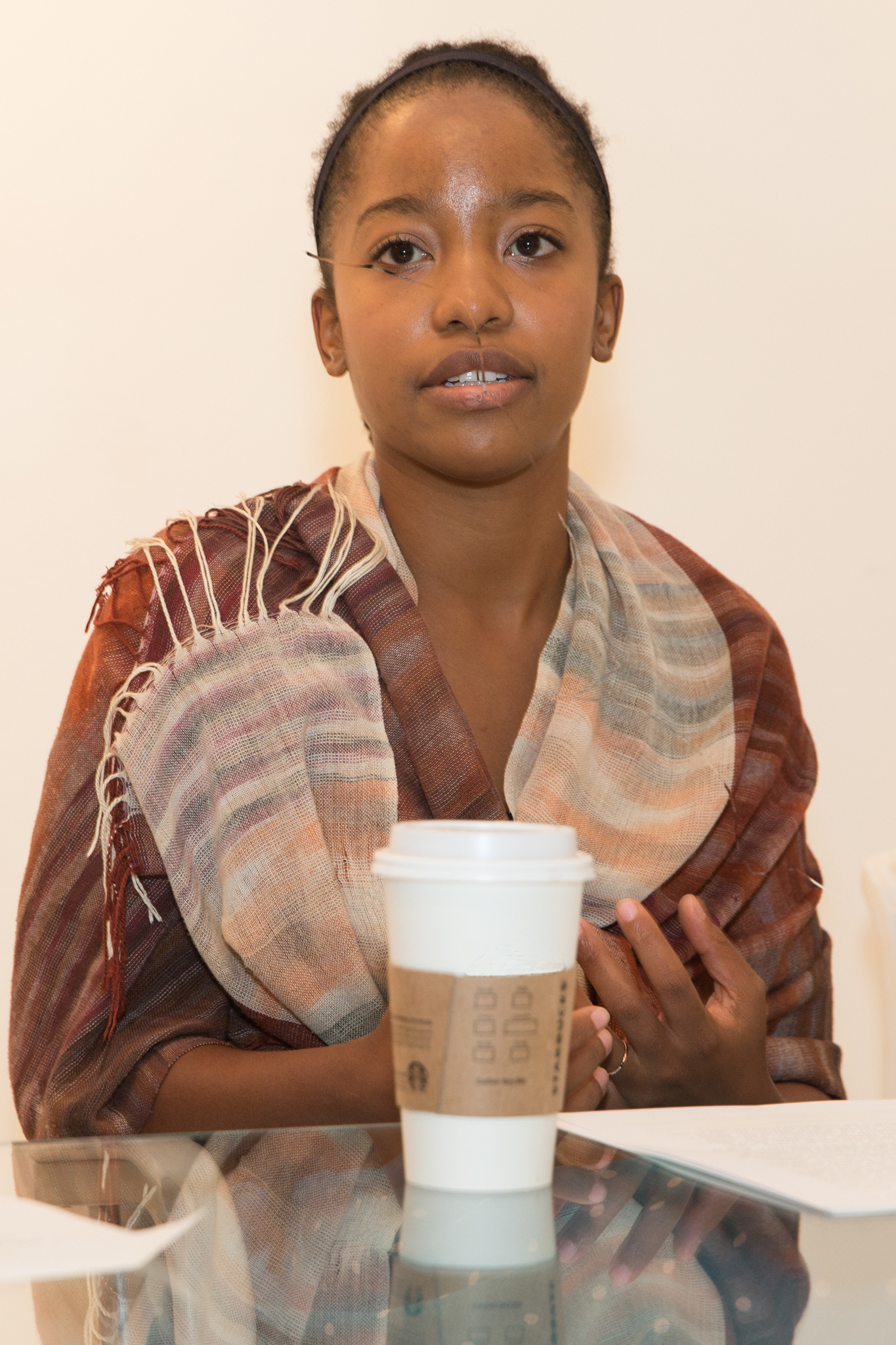
- Born: 1981 (age 44–45); Berkeley, California, U.S.
- Education: Columbia University (BA); School of the Art Institute of Chicago (MFA)
- Occupations: Artist, educator
- Awards: Herb Alpert Award (2021); Guggenheim Fellowship (2020); Creative Capital Award (2020); Radcliffe Fellowship (2016)
- Website: www.steffanijemison.com

Steffani Jemison (born 1981) is an American artist, writer, and educator. Her videos and multimedia projects explore the relationship between Black embodiment, sound cultures, and vernacular practices to modernism and conceptual art. Her work has been shown at the Museum of Modern Art, Brooklyn Museum, Guggenheim Museum, Whitney Museum, Stedelijk Museum Amsterdam, and other U.S. and international venues. She is based in Brooklyn, New York and is represented by Greene Naftali, New York and Annet Gelink, Amsterdam.

== Early life and education ==
Jemison was born in 1981 in Berkeley, California, and grew up in Cincinnati, Ohio. As a child, she attended summer camp at the Carnegie Museum of Art. Her favorite class was one in which she was asked to write a story about one of the works in the collection.

She holds a BA degree in comparative literature from Columbia University (2003); and an MFA degree from the School of the Art Institute of Chicago (2009).

== Teaching career ==
Jemison is an assistant professor in media in the department of art and design at the Mason Gross School of the Arts at Rutgers University. She previously taught at the Parsons School of Design and the Art Institute of Chicago.

== Works ==
Major works include Prime (2016), Promise Machine (2015), Projections (2014), Stroke (2013) You Completes Me (2013), Personal (2014), Escaped Lunatic (2010–2011), Maniac Chase (2008–2009), and Same Time. Jemison's 2014 video Personal was included in the 2014 show "Crossing Brooklyn: Art from Bushwick, Bed-Stuy, and Beyond" at the Brooklyn Museum.

Promise Machine combined a reading group with performance. Participants formed a "Utopia Club," based on the Utopia Neighborhood Club, and including artists, activists, writers, and book club members. Jemison created a musical performance incorporating text generated in the reading group. She was partially inspired by the shared reading experiences that a church creates. Promise Machine attempts to create a similar experience in a secular space. Prime references texts from key historical and cultural moments to explore the relationship between privacy and revolution.

You Completes Me is a performance installation that a live reading of excerpts from urban fiction while the 1927 film The Scar of Shame plays, putting historical moments in conversation with contemporary ones.

Jemison's films Manic Chase and Escaped Lunatic are both inspired by early twentieth-century films. They focus on the actors' movements; she is particularly interested in the political implications of movement.

Along with Heather Hart and Jina Valentine, she curated "The Intuitionists," a viewing program in which artists illustrated concepts from a paragraph in Colson Whitehead's novel, The Intuitionist. This installation was part of a viewing program at the Drawing Center.

As an agent in the Hillman Photography Initiative at the Carnegie Museum of Art, Jemison collaborated with Liz Deschenes, Laura Wexler, and Dan Leers to create a platform demonstrating the relationship between photography and Pittsburgh. Their work emphasized the physical conditions that make photography possible.

=== Future Plan and Program (2010–2011) ===
Jemison's 2010–2011 project Future Plan and Program commissions and publishes literary works by artists of color. It continued her artistic interest in reading while aiming to make books available to a wide community. It has published works by Martine Syms, Jibade-Khalil Huffman, Harold Mendez, and Jina Valentine, among others.

== Solo exhibitions ==
- End Over End, JOAN, Los Angeles, 2022.
- Steffani Jemison, Annet Gelink, Amsterdam, 2022.
- Broken Fall, Greene Naftali, New York, 2021.
- End Over End, Contemporary Arts Center, Cincinnati, 2021.
- Steffani Jemison: Sensus Plenior, Everson Museum of Art, Syracuse, New York, 2020.
- Steffani Jemison, Kai Matsumiya, New York, 2019.
- Steffani Jemison: New Videos, Stedelijk Museum, Amsterdam, 2019.
- Decoders – Recorders, De Appel, Amsterdam, 2019.
- Sensus Plenior, curated by Osei Bonsu, Jeu de Paume, Paris; CAPC Bordeaux, 2017.
- Escaped Lunatic, MoMA, New York, 2016.
- Steffani Jemison: Maniac Chase, Escaped Lunatic, and Personal, RISD Museum, Providence, Rhode Island, 2015.
- Same Time, curated by Amanda Hunt, LAXART, Los Angeles, 2013.
- Museum as Hub: Alpha's Bet Is Not Over Yet, New Museum of Contemporary Art, New York, 2011.

== Awards and honors ==
Jemison’s work has been supported by a Herb Alpert Award in the Arts, a Guggenheim Fellowship, a Creative Capital Award, a Radcliffe Fellowship, a New York Foundation for the Arts Fellowship, a Tiffany Foundation Fellowship, an Anonymous Was a Woman Award, and many other grants and awards. Artist residencies include the Studio Museum in Harlem AIR, the Sharpe-Walentas Studio Program, Project Row Houses, the Museum of Fine Arts Houston CORE Program, the International Studio and Curatorial Program, and the Skowhegan School of Painting and Sculpture.
