= Maria del Carmen Montoya =

American artist

- Born: Houston, Texas, U.S.
- Known for: Participatory art, sculpture, new media, Ghana Think Tank

Academic background
- Education: Loyola University Chicago; Rhode Island College, Rhode Island School of Design

Academic work
- Discipline: Art, Sculpture, New Media
- Sub-discipline: Participatory Art
- Institutions: Corcoran School of Art and Design; George Washington University

Maria del Carmen Montoya is an American artist working in participatory art, sculpture and new media. Her work is inherently collaborative and collective. In 2009, Montoya became a core member of Ghana Think Tank along with Christopher Robbins and John Ewing. Ghana Think Tank is an international artist collective that "develops the first world" by flipping traditional power dynamics, asking people living in the "third world" to intervene into the lives of the people living in the so-called "developed" world. Montoya is an assistant professor in sculpture and spatial practices at the Corcoran School of Art and Design at George Washington University.

== Early life and education ==
Maria del Carmen Montoya grew up on the outskirts of Houston, Texas, in a Northside working-class neighborhood.

Her mother, for whom she was named, was born on the Palo Alto ranch in the Sonoran Desert in Mexico. Her mother worked on the U.S.–Mexican border in Ciudad Juárez and El Paso. Soon after marrying Montoya's father, she opened a small import shop. Due to customer demand, she began stocking paraphernalia, and her store soon became a popular head shop. Carmen and her family lived in the back room of the store and she learned all about American rock music and how to talk to strangers helping her mother tend shop. Her mother now runs a small import stand in a Fiesta Mart. Montoya's personal family history of immigration and experience with fringe cultures deeply influences her artistic practice.

== Education ==
Montoya earned a BA from Loyola University Chicago in 1995, where she studied philosophy and women's studies. Her second degree was in nursing in 1999. She received an MFA from the Rhode Island School of Design in 2007.

== Career ==
She is a member of the Ghana ThinkTank.

=== Awards ===
- Creative Capital for Emerging Fields (2013) for Ghana Think Tanks's project Mexican/US Border.
- John S. and James L. Knight Foundation Arts Challenge Grant (2017) for a Ghana Think Tank collaborative project Central Detroit Christian CDC for the American Riad Project.
- Black Rock Arts Grant (2011), with Ghana Think Tank.
- Puffin Foundation Arts Grant
- Finalist for Frieze Foundation Cartier Award
- CEC Arts Link Award (2011) for Ghana Think Tank project in Kosovo.
- Queens Museum of Art Public Art Commission (2010) with Ghana Think Tank
- Rhizome Commission for New Media (2009) for I Sky You, a collaborative project created with Kevin Patton
- Artist-in-Residence Arab American National Museum (2018)
- Artist-in-Residence Grand Central Art Center (2018)
- Humanities Facilitating Fund Award, The George Washington University
