= Mercedes Dorame =

American photographer from California (born 1980)

- Born: 1980 (age 45–46); Los Angeles, California
- Citizenship: American
- Education: BA: University of California, Los Angeles
- Alma mater: MFA: San Francisco Art Institute
- Website: mercedesdorame.com

Mercedes Dorame (born 1980) is an American photographer based in Malibu, California.

== Background and education ==
Mercedes Dorame was born in 1980 in Los Angeles, California, and identifies as having Tongva ancestry.

Dorame earned her bachelor's degree from the University of California, Los Angeles, in 2003. She earned her master of fine arts degree from the San Francisco Art Institute in 2010.

== Art career ==
Dorame's work is in the permanent collections of Hammer Museum and San Francisco Museum of Modern Art, and has been shown at the Catalina Museum for Art and History. The Los Angeles Times has covered her work.

== Works ==
She works in structural installation, with her works Orion’s Belt—Paahe’ Sheshiiyot—a map for moving between worlds (2018) and Our Land and Sky Waking Up - ‘Eyoo’ooxon koy Tokuupar Chorii’aa (2021) incorporating cog stones found on a site being commercially developed in the north Orange County, California area that are approximately 75,000 years old. Her piece "Portal for Tovaangar" was virtually installed on the LACMA campus. Between June 20, 2023 through June 16, 2024, Dorame's work Woshaa’axre Yaang’aro (Looking Back) was featured in the main hall of the Getty Center.

== Awards and honors ==
Dorame was named a Harpo Foundation fellow in 2011 and En Foco's New Works Photography fellow in 2012. The San Francisco Foundation presented Dorame with its James D. Phelan Award in the Visual Arts in 2017. She received a Creative Capital Grant in 2020. In 2026, she was named a United States Artists (USA) Fellow.
