= Tyler Green (journalist) =

American author, historian and art critic

- Born: California
- Education: University of Missouri
- Occupations: Art critic, author, historian

Tyler Green is an American author, historian and critic. He produces and hosts The Modern Art Notes Podcast, a weekly digital audio program that features interviews with artists and art historians. Art critic Sebastian Smee called The MAN Podcast "one of the great archives of the art of our time." The BBC's Sophia Smith Galer named the program one of the world's top 25 culture podcasts.

Green's book about 19th-century artist Carleton Watkins, Carleton Watkins: Making the West American, was published by University of California Press in October, 2018. Watkins (1829–1916) is considered by some the greatest American photographer of the 19th century and arguably the most influential artist of his era. He is best known for his pictures of Yosemite Valley and the nearby Mariposa Grove of giant sequoias—pictures that motivated and informed the national park idea. In the Los Angeles Times, Christopher Knight wrote that Watkins is “[f]ascinating and indispensable . . . . The lack of a Watkins biography was a gaping hole in our historical understanding of American art …. Passages that analyze Watkins’ extraordinary compositions are among the book’s most revealing.” Maika Pollack, writing in Aperture magazine, said, "This book is a thoughtfully researched meditation on a photographer’s complex contribution to the formation of our national identity . . .. Green’s research is not just about Watkins, but about the significance of the American West, and in some ways the definition of America itself. . . . [M]uch like Watkins’s work, Making the West American is at once technical and transcendent." The book was granted a 2019 California Book Awards gold medal as a "contribution to publishing".

Green wrote and edited the pioneering website Modern Art Notes (MAN) from 2001 to 2014. It was among the first visual art blogs, and may have been the first website to feature original criticism and reporting about art and art institutions. The U.S. chapter of the International Association of Art Critics (AICA-USA) awarded Green its inaugural award for art blogging in 2014. The award included a citation for the MAN Podcast. (The award for art criticism was given to New York Times critic Holland Cotter.) He has been critic-in-residence at Platform Seoul's Tomorrow biennial and at Washington University in St. Louis.

From 2010 to 2014, Green was a columnist for the monthly art magazine, Modern Painters. He is a member of the United States section of the International Association of Art Critics (AICA).

== Career ==
Green has written for many print and digital magazines, including New York Times Lens, Fortune, Conde Nast Portfolio, the California History Society Quarterly, and Smithsonian. Green has contributed op-ed pieces to newspapers such as the Los Angeles Times, the Boston Globe, the Philadelphia Inquirer and the Wall Street Journal. His commentary has also aired on National Public Radio’s “All Things Considered.” Books featuring his work include San Francisco Museum of Modern Art 360: Views on the Collection, Anne Appleby: We Sit Together the Mountain and Me (Tacoma Art Museum), and David Maisel's Proving Ground.

== Modern Art Notes ==
This website covered modern and contemporary art issues and featured criticism. Forbes magazine once named MAN a "Best of the Web" site, and publications such as the New York Times, the Los Angeles Times, the Wall Street Journal, Time, the Detroit Free Press, the Boston Globe, the Denver Post, the Seattle Post-Intelligencer, Slate, and Art in America all featured MAN.
