= Heidi Kumao =

American video and machine artist

Heidi Kumao (born 1964) is a video and machine artist, and professor at the University of Michigan. She has received a Guggenheim Fellowship and a Creative Capital Emerging Fields Award.

== Work ==
In her work, Kumao projects video, often stop-motion animation, onto various surfaces, including machines. Her 1994 work, Feed, projected animations from zoetrope machines onto surfaces such as "a player-piano scroll, a paper screen, blank photograph frames, and the interior of a cardboard box."

In 2005, Kumao created a series of machines suggesting women's legs for the piece Misbehaving: Media Machines Act Out. The legs were named "Protest," "Resist," and "Translator." With videos embedded into the legs' torsos, the machines acted out "tableaus of protest" such as stomping on the floor, writhing on the ground or dance.

Kumao broke her back in 2011. Her work has since incorporated aspects of the body. Other works explore human constraint, such as human trafficking and Japanese-American internment camps.

== Awards ==
- 2009: Guggenheim Fellowship
- 2008: Governor's Award for Michigan Innovative Artist
- 2007: Postdoctoral Research Fellowship from the American Association of University Women Educational Foundation
- 2006: Malvina Hoffmann Award for Finest Sculpture from the National Academy
- 2002: Creative Capital Emerging Fields Award
