= Josely Carvalho =

Brazilian artist (born 1942)

- Born: September 21, 1942 (age 84); Sao Paulo, Brazil
- Education: Washington University in St. Louis
- Website: joselycarvalho.com

Josely Carvalho (born September 21, 1942) is a Brazilian artist who is based in New York City and Rio de Janeiro.

She works in a wide range of media including painting, sculpture, printmaking, book art, video, and installation. In the last four decades, her artwork has embraced several mediums and seeks to highlight memory, identity, women issues and social justice while consistently challenges frontiers between artist and public and art and politics. Currently her research is foucused in olfactory art - smells to evoke memories and emotions in her project Diary of Smells. Is an on-going cross-disciplinary sensorial project considering the olfactory as protagonist among other typically dominant components in contemporary art such as video, sound, photography, book-art and installations. Each artwork represents a page from the diary such as URUKU - the forgotten disciplines, Passages, Shards, Glass Ceiling, Affectio.

== Education ==
Carvalho's higher education started at the Armando Alvares Penteado Foundation. Upon moving to the United States, Carvalho graduated with a bachelor's degree from the Washington University School of Architecture in 1967. After she transitioned into a teaching role, she taught at the National Autonomous University of Mexico School of Architecture from 1971–1974.

== Selected works ==
=== Diary of Smells: Affectio (2019) ===
Olfactory Interactive Installation

Exhibited at Museu Nacional de Belas Artes (MNBA), Rio de Janeiro, Brazil (May 17th, 2019 - Sep 29th, 2019).

The installation is composed of six original smells: Anoxia, Lacrimae, Barricade, Dust, Pepper and Queen of the Night. Each of the smells were encapsulated and put into blown glass sculptures. The sculptures were spread by the museum creating dialogue with specific pieces from the permanent's collection.

=== Diary of Smells: Glass Ceiling (2018) ===
Olfactory Interactive Installation

Exhibited at Museu de Arte Contemporânea de São Paulo (MAC-USP), São Paulo, Brazil (March 3rd, 2018 - June 5th, 2018)

The installation is divided in two parts:

The first one is Estilhaços/ Shards which is composed by six original smells that integrated the homonymous artist's book from 2015. The smells are: Persistence, Affection, Pleasure, Absence, Emptiness, Illusion.

The second part, the visitors could access passing through a printed curtain with the artwork 1888.Upsidedown, encapsulated with the Shards smell. The next room was occupied by the corten steel and glass sculpture Marielle Franco (1979-2018) and six original smells: Anoxia, Lacrimae, Barricade, Dust, Pepper and Queen of the Night. Each of the smells were encapsulated and put into blown glass sculptures.

=== Shards (2015) ===
Shards/Estilhaços is an on- going artwork project based on the artist's collection of broken wine glasses. It is organised through an olfactory artist’s book and site-specific installations.

Shards, It was glass and it broke is a scented artist book that brings together artisanal work and nanotechnology. The scents in this book have their origin in texts by six writers created from the memory of a forgotten smell left in wineglass shards at the moment of breakage. The smells created by the artist with support of Givaudan do Brasil are: Affection, Absence, Illusion, Pleasure, Emptiness, and Persistence. The book cover exudes the fragrance Glass, developed by Nadège Le Garlantezec, performer at Givaudan, Paris. It is trapped in volatile molecules inside the fibers of the handmade paper, produced at the Universidade de Brasilia, to preserve the scent and ensure that it emanates slowly when touched. The book contains seven photographs, a representation of the artist's collection of broken glasses transmuted to fantasy scenarios.

The installation Shards was presented in Center for Book Arts, New York and in Casa da América Latina, Universidade de Brasília, Brazil.

=== Diary of Smells: Passages (2012) ===
Olfactory Interactive Installation

Site-specific interactive installation, 1000 resin/glass molded branches, video projection and six channels sound algorithmically manipulated by computer programming, light, mirrored floor tiles, four smells (Smell of Nest, Open Sea, Hot Sun and Wet Earth)

In this installation the 1000 resin/glass branches were configured as an abandoned nest. Smell of Nest exhaled from the sculpture and the other 3 smells were experienced through personal dispensers. Video projected smell memories given previously through a smell-memory-blog by the public

=== URU-KU: the forgotten disciplines (2011) ===
Olfactory Interactive Installation

Exhibited at Galeria de Arte Casarão, Viana, Espírito Santo, Brazil (April)

The installation is composed by URU-KU (750 branches dipped in urucum powder and video Ich Kann), Smell Flasks (300 empty perfume glasses which the community was invited to fill with a smell memory and register in an index card) and Book of Smells (18 photographs, artist book and cabinet file).

This project is a result of the artistic residence "Mas que arte que cabe numa cidade?" from Viana district, a city at Espírito Santo state, south-east of Brazil.

=== Book of Roofs (Livro de Telhas) (1997) ===
Interactive Installment - videos/photographs

This project was initiated when Carvalho saw a stack of clay tiles and the worker's process of creating these tiles from the initial shaping stage to the final stage of having to place of the tiles. This process, and labor in specific, was art to Carvalho. The major theme in this installment, which include approximately 3,000 tiles, is the idea of shelter and how there is a loss of shelter with the involvement of wars and natural disasters. The loss and destruction of one's shelter then leads to a domino effect that leads to deterioration and damage to one's physical, psychological, and emotional loss of an individual. Carvalho implemented an interactive component which is available in two ways - the interactive website that's available online and allowing viewers become a tile-maker for this installment. In 2000, this online installment earned Carvalho Creative Capital Foundation individual artist grant. Access to installment can be found at http://bookofroofs.com/index.cfm

=== Cirandas I (1993) ===
Installation - Videos/photographs

Bring attention to the abuse and violence of children in Brazil as many children had to rely on each other, sell their bodies into prostitution, become drug distributors, and steal whatever was accessible to them for survival. Many of these children were often killed by gunshot wound or decapitation by government officials or citizen vigilante groups to eradicate them from this region. The video installation for this piece featured images of Brazilian children, both dead and alive, and lists all the names and ages of the children that were found dead in Rio de Janeiro in the year 1991.

=== Rape and Intervention (1984) ===
Silkscreen

This piece was created for the Artists Call Against the U.S. Intervention in Central America, which was a nationwide call to protest initiated by artists themselves in 1984. Using her notorious silkscreen printing that Carvalho is known for, it features a young girl at the top of the wearing only underwear with soldiers underneath her in military clothes and guns. This collaborative piece was one out of six panel installments discussing themes of rape and intervention that also featured the works of other artists including Catalina Parra, Paulette Nenner and Nancy Spero.

=== The Silkscreen Project (1976 - 1987) ===
Founder and director of The Silkscreen Project, which operated at St. Mark's Church in-the-Bowery from 1976 to 1987.

to allow community members to learn silkscreen printing so that they’d be able to make posters and banners to use for protest and activism.

- Recognition with community involvement and progress with the Silkscreen Project lead to Carvalho being invited to U.N. Mid-Decade Conference for Women, which covered issues relating to social, political, and economic discrimination toward female artists. Other women and conference attendees were taught how to silkscreen press as well.
- Invited by the Comunidades Eclesiasticas de Base and the Workers Party back in Brazil to teach the how to create silkscreen banners that were going to be used for protest and activism. The party's leaders then passed down this information to community members that they worked with.

Carvalho created the Latin American Women Artists to bring attention to other Latina artists in the United States. This project was initiated in 1983 and ended in 1987.

- Series contained work from various Latina artists from various backgrounds and experiences to share their work, from poetry to films.

== Collections ==
- Museum of Modern Art, NYC
- Museu de Arte Contemporânea, São Paulo, Brazil
- Museu de Arte de São Paulo, Brazil
- Casa de Las Americas, Havana, Cuba
- Seguros Sociais, Mexico; Museo de Bellas Artes, Caracas, Venezuela
- Pinacoteca do Estado de São Paulo
- Museu Nacional de Belas Artes, Rio de Janeiro
- Museum of Contemporary Art at Jacksonville, Florida.

== Honors and awards ==
- Lee-Krasner Award for Life Achievement from Pollock Krasner Foundation, 2023.
- Pollock Krasner Foudantion Grant, 2016 and 2019.
- The Art and Olfaction Award - Sadakichi Award for experimental work with scent, 2019
- Creative Capital Foundation Grant, 2000-2005
- New York State Council for the Arts, 2001-2002
- Harvestworks Digital Media Arts Center Residency, 2001
- Rockefeller Foundation's Bellagio International Conference and Residency in Italy, 2000
- New York Foundation for the Arts, 1999-2000

== Publications ==
- Diary of Images (artist's monograph) (2018)
- She is Visited by Birds and Turtles (1988)
- Diary of Images: It's Still Time to Mourn (1992)
- It's Still Time to Mourn: Dia Mater I (1993)
- It's Still Time to Mourn: Dia Mater II (1993)
