= Christine Tarkowski =

American sculptor

- Born: 1967 (age 58–59)
- Education: Fashion Institute of Technology, Parsons School of Design, School of the Art Institute of Chicago
- Known for: Sculpture and Installation art
- Awards: Creative Capital Visual Arts award 2001; Richard H. Driehaus Foundation Individual Artist Award; 2005
- Website: christinetarkowski.com

Christine Tarkowski (born 1967) is an American sculptor and installation artist. Through her art, she explores the impact of the built environment (including architecture and textile technologies) on the natural environment.

== Life and career ==
Tarkowski was born in Norwich, Connecticut, but now lives and works in Chicago, Illinois. After studying textile design at the Fashion Institute of Technology, she earned her BFA at the Parsons School of Design in New York City in 1989 and her MFA at the School of the Art Institute of Chicago in Chicago, IL in 1992. In addition to her work as an artist, Christine has been an associate professor in the Fiber and Material Studies department at the School of the Art Institute of Chicago since 2003. In 2001, she received a Creative Capital Visual Arts award and in 2005, she received a Richard H. Driehaus Foundation Individual Artist Award.

== Works ==
She has exhibited significant solo and group shows, including the exhibition titled, Last Things Will Be First and First Things Will be Last that was on display at the Chicago Cultural Center from January 29 - May 2, 2010. In this piece, as with many of Tarkowski’s works, there was the incorporation of a geodesic dome, which she uses as a symbol for the failed utopia. The utopian impulse of modernism and its failure is a recurring theme in her work, manifesting through transformed and mimicked urban materials like wallpaper, industrial siding, and trash.

She has worked with many other established artists including Drew Beattie, Aidas Bareikis, and Jules de Balincourt. They were all invited to contribute to a music video and exhibition piece called, Can’t Stop Rock Lobster created by Shoot the Lobster art gallery in New York City. The exhibit ran from June 19–30, 2012.
