= Marie Sester =

French-American artist (born 1955)

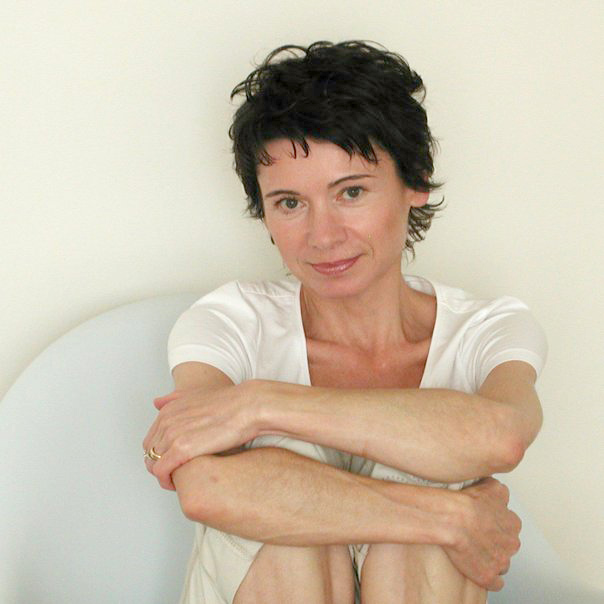
- Marie Sester, July 2007
- Born: 1955 (age 70–71)
- Citizenship: United States; France
- Education: Ecole d'Architecture, Strasbourg

Marie Sester born in 1955 is a French-American decades-long artist, and current PhD student studying the nature of consciousness. Her artwork involves cross-disciplinary practices and experimental systems in Interactive Art using tracking technologies, light, audio, video, and biofeedback, focusing on social awareness and the responsibility of personal commitments. Her PhD work is in Integral and Transpersonal Psychology focusing on connectedness, expansiveness, and presence.

== Biography ==
Born in France, Marie Sester studied to be an architect, earning a master's degree (Architect DPLG, M Arch) from the Ecole d'Architecture in Strasbourg, France in 1980. She soon shifted from the practice of architecture to the practice of representational arts. While receiving recognition for her paintings and drawings, she moved to Paris and started traveling through Europe and Africa. After receiving a residency in Japan in 1993, her work shifted toward an exploration of public space, creating installations and experimental interactive works.

After several long-term residencies including in New York, Los Angeles, Portland (OR), and Gifu (Japan), she relocated from Paris to the U.S., living between New York, San Francisco, and Los Angeles.

== Work ==
On the theoretical level, after she graduated, Marie Sester's interests shifted from designing physical structures to the study of ideological frameworks, specifically how culture, politics and technology affect our spatial awareness, our emotions and beliefs. For several years, Marie Sester's work focused on notions of identity and awareness - how we shun or invite attention, exert or lose control of our personal or public spaces, and how we navigate through contemporary society's ever more ubiquitous systems of surveillance and monitoring on one hand, visibility and self-promotion on the other hand. Almost always placing the individual at its center, her work relied on literal interactions with its audiences, creating encounters where it is not clear if one has wandered into some sort of game -or stumbled upon something more sinister.

Her work gradually shifted toward understanding the nature of consciousness. In 2014, she began an online artwork titled “Once Only,” which included an interview series with scientists and thinkers at the forefront of the science of consciousness. She attended the University of Arizona's Science of Consciousness Conferences in 2014 and 2016, and in 2018 was accepted in the Integral and Transpersonal Psychology (ITP) PhD program at the California Institute of Integral Studies. She is currently writing her dissertation.

== Art Shows and Recognition ==
Marie Sester received grants from Creative Capital (2002), LEF Foundation (2004), New York State Council on the Arts (2004 and 2011). She was in residence at the Institute of Advanced Media Arts and Sciences – IAMAS, Gifu, Japan (2001–02) and Eyebeam, NY (2003).

Her work has earned recognition in the art and technology worlds, including an Honorary Mention in Interactive Art from Ars Electronica (2003), a Webby Award for Net Art (2004) and a spot on the "50 Coolest Websites" list on Time Magazine Online (2004).

Her works have been included in the Seoul and Singapore Biennales (2008), and installed at Glow Eindhoven, The Netherlands (2009), SFMOMA, San Francisco (2010–2011), EMPAC, Troy, New York (2010–2011), and Z33, Hasselt, Belgium (2011), to list a few.

== Current Research ==
Her research examines the felt senses of expansion and connection. More specifically, the correlation between a heart-located attentional posture and an expansive felt sense of connection with others beings and other situations. What happens when the self dwells in the heart, and engages with the world from there?
