= Tarkovsky (surname) =

Tarkovsky (Russian: Тарковский) is a Russian surname of Dagestani (Kumyk) and also Polish origin. The feminine form is Tarkovskaya (Russian: Тарковская). This surname may refer to:

- Arseny Tarkovsky (1907–1989), Russian poet and translator, father of Andrei Tarkovsky
- Andrei Tarkovsky (1932–1986), Russian filmmaker
- Irma Raush (born 1938), formerly Irma Tarkovskaya, Russian actress and director, first wife of Andrei Tarkovsky
- Nuh-bey Tarkovsky (1878–1951), North Caucasian military commander

== See also ==
- Tarkowski, a Polish surname
- 3345 Tarkovskij, an asteroid named after Andrei Tarkovsky
