= Ghana Think Tank =

Ghana Think Tank is a public art project founded in 2006. They are a global network, with think tanks located in Ghana, Cuba, Serbia, Mexico, and El Salvador. Their mission to "develop the first world" is implemented by finding solutions to problems in Europe and the United States by sending them to their think tanks to analyze. Some themes include immigration, legal waiting zones, and racial profiling.

== Background ==
The Ghana think tank was founded by Christopher Robbins, John Ewing and Matey Odonkor in 2006. They were later joined by Carmen Montoya in 2009. Christopher Robbins, while working at the Peace Corps in Benin, witnessed "first world" countries attempting to solve the issues of a culture they were completely unfamiliar with For him, the Ghana Think Tank was initially a response to that experience, turning it upside down and allowing other cultures to find solutions for the United States and their "first world" problems.

One of Ghana Think Tank's earliest projects took place in Providence, Rhode Island. The problems listed varied in importance, from "obesity in america" and "homelessness" to "I can't dance." Although never implemented, one suggested solution from El Salvador for obesity and homelessness was to hire the homeless, dress them up in fat suits and make them perform social theater to overweight individuals. This proposal was never fulfilled but it was decided after this that the Ghana Think Tank would implement each solution no matter how irrational it may be.

== Mission ==
Ghana Think Tank's mission is to "develop the first world."

The proposed solutions are then implemented seriously whether impractical or not. Some solutions proposed were increasing diversity by hiring immigrant Day Laborers to attend social functions in a wealthy town, recording "funny, dirty stories" of the elderly to share with younger individuals in order to help bridge generation gaps, and dressing as municipal workers to construct public works projects in Liverpool, UK. One goal of the think tank is to bring awareness to the consequences or potential benefits an outsider can bring.

== Projects ==
In 2011, Ghana Think Tank was faced with a recurring problem of Latin American immigrants in Queens being harassed by police officers for loitering. They sent this issue to their think tanks in Ghana, Cuba, and El Salvador. A solution proposed and later implemented were legal waiting zones. The think tank posted up signs and taped the floors where the individuals could loiter freely

Summer 2011, The Think Tank collected problems from the Serbs, sending them to the Albanians and vice versa. Since the war in 1999, some people still have not crossed the bridge that separates them but for this project, we convinced them to work with the other side. Some solutions proposed were "Albanians and Serbs cooperating to clean up their river so more children will play in it, building a public swimming pool on the main bridge (since it seems to serve more as a symbol or wall than tool for transport), to a free public bus that just drives back and forth to random places in the North and South. "

Early 2013, Ghana ThinkTank worked as cultural ambassadors in Morocco. Americans submitted questions such as help in building relationship between neighbors that Moroccans helped find solutions for. The think tank traveled through rural villages asking Moroccans for help solving the problems using a solar powered donkey cart that included a video booth. One solution to the afore mentioned problem was to create buildings where neighbors see each other more. Another question submitted was "how do you determine the truth?" which inspired a conversation with one resident stating "the other is hell, but for you (Ghana Think Tank) the other is the solution."

February 2014, the Think Tank traveled to Tijuana, Mexico to collect immigration problems and solutions along the Mexico/American border. The problems were collected from Minutemen and Patriot organizations in the United States then were brought to recently deported immigrants at Casa Del Migrantes. The Think Tank also met with Casa Maria del Asunta, home for deported women and children, and Mexican migrant-workers in the San Diego area.

== Awards ==
On January 10, 2013 Creative Capital announced that the Ghana Think Tank would be receiving a grant award for the category of Emerging Fields. The foundation would grant Ghana think tank over $60,000 in direct financial support and advisory services.

Creative Capital’s investment in each project includes up to $50,000 in direct financial support (disbursed at key points over the life of each project), plus more than $40,000 in advisory services, making our total 2013 investment more than $4,140,000.

They have also received awards from the Knight Foundation, MIT Community Fund, New York Foundation for the Arts, STEIM, SIGRAPH, and Rhizome Commission.

In 2010, Ghana ThinkTank was a finalist for the Frieze Foundation Cartier Award.

== Exhibitions ==
The Ghana Think Tank has exhibited at the Venice Biennial of Architecture, Museum of Contemporary Art, New Museum Festival of Ideas, FACT - the Foundation for Art and Creative Technology, Museum Arte Util, the Shenzhen and Hong Kong Bi-City Biennale of Urbanism and Architecture, the Art Museum of the Americas, and the National Museum of Wales.
