= Susan Robb =

Susan Robb is an American visual artist based in Seattle, Washington, United States.

== Life ==
Robb was born in Connecticut and attended Syracuse University in New York where she received a BFA in Photography and a BA in Art History. She earned her MFA in photography at the University of Washington in Seattle. She played in the music projects Incredible Force of Junior and Goatmax1. Her work has been shown nationally and internationally including exhibitions at the Henry Art Gallery, the Berkley Art Museum, and Blindside Gallery in Melbourne, Australia.

== Artistic practice ==
According to her Creative Capital profile, Susan Robb's work is an "ongoing investigation of people, place and the search for utopia." Drawing on her own travel experiences, the utopian thought at play in intentional communities, and the hands-on ethos of DIY subcultures, she depicts the kaleidoscopic relationship we have with our surroundings. Works such as Sleeper Cell Training Camp, The Long Walk, and Scent of the Trails require spontaneous involvement from her audience and in return deliver a reordering of the expected relationships to each other and their surroundings. She combines poetic applications of technology (from muscle wire circuitry to methane digesters), an interrogation and manipulation of materials (giant black plastic bags to cultured crystals), and a re-purposing of forms and sites (bike parking-as-social hub; hiking trail-as-game space).

=== Projects ===
Robb has undertaken several long-form project involving travel and site-specific exploration including

- The Wild Times Project where Robb embarked on a 5-month journey from Mexico to Canada on the Pacific Crest Trail, while creating works of art inspired by her experiences.
- SKYPE SKLPT STUDIO in which Robb collaborated with other artists to make sculptures through Skype video calls during a 3-month residency at Cornish College of the Arts.
- The Long Walk

=== Selected bibliography ===
- Graves, Jen, "Susan Robb Is Going from Mexico to Canada Like No Artist Has Gone Before", The Stranger, 2014.
- Manitach, Amanda, "Westward Expansion", CityArts, 2014.
- Ayers, Robert, "Susan Robb: Connecting People And the Wilderness", The Seattle Times, 2013.
- Mitchell, Robert and Thurtle, Phillip, ed., Data Made Flesh: Embodying Information, Routeledge, 2013.
- Hunter, Allison, "Light as Air Houston", Sculpture, 2010.
- Natake, Kazuko, "Susan Robb Lawrimore Project", Sculpture, 2009.
- Spector, Tami & Schummur, Joachim, "Aesthetics and Visualization in Chemistry", HYLE, International Journal for the Philosophy of Chemistry, 2003.
- Spalding, David, "The Missing Link: Art, Biotechnology, and the Disappearance of Difference", Artweek, 2003.
- Madoff, Steven Henry, "The Wonders of Genetics Breed an New Art", The New York Times, 2002.

== Awards and major grants ==
- Creative Capital Grant, 2013, Americans for the Arts/Public Art Network - America's Top 50 Public Art Projects, 2012
- 4Culture Group Project Grant, 2012
- City of Seattle CityArtist Project Grant, 2004
