= Zhi Lin =

Zhi Lin is a Chinese American mixed-media artist, a native of Nanjing, China. While he was a graduate fellow at the University College London's Slade School in 1989, the political events and social movements around the world convinced him to use his artwork for social, history and cultural awareness, and "to engage political and social reforms in our society." Since that time his work has been a visual examination of the patterns of violence, intolerance, injustice, and complicity in public behavior."

== Education and career ==
Zhi Lin was born in Nanjing, China.

Zhi Lin's career as an artist began at the China Academy of Art in Hangzhou where he earned his Bachelor of Fine Arts in Printmaking, and his postgraduate studies. In 1987, Lin attended the Slade School of Fine Art at University College London in London, UK, where he later achieved his Master of Fine Arts. From 1989 to 1992 he studied and earned his another Master of Fine Arts at the University of Delaware in the United States. In 1992, he began his teaching career at the Missouri State University as an assistant professor, and received his tenure and promoted to the rank of associate professor in 1997. In 2001, he joined the faculty of the School of Art + Art History + Design at the University of Washington, and lives and works in Seattle since.

== Selected works ==
=== Five Capital Punishments in China (1992–2007) ===
Lin's most political and dramatic piece, Five Capital Punishments in China, reflects a dramatized interpretation of human brutality during the Tiananmen Square Massacre. The work features five 12 x 7 foot paintings on canvas and ribbon, each with a depiction of capital punishment in Chinese history: Flaying, Starvation, Decapitation, Drawing and Quartering, and the Firing Squad. Lin incorporates government or court-sanctioned publicly torturing/killing their victims in a crowded gathering with astounding detail and accuracy.

Five Capital Punishments in China, was not only skillfully executed, but also painstakingly arranged. Costumes were purchased via online stores as well as Chinese markets. He first made thumbnail sketches of all the different arrangements he envisioned for the punishments. After selecting which arrangement he felt strongest, Lin used charcoal to draw the entire composition with detailed figures and scenes as an under-drawing. Each 12 x 7 foot canvas painting was then painted with acrylic paint. Finally, each was completed with a large scale screen-print-images superimposed on the entire canvas and framed in Thanka Tibetan style scroll The five painting series is a mixed media project, however, he completed two different versions of the Drawing and Quartering, one is a solely charcoal drawing (completed in 2003, and acquired by the Princeton University Art Museum), and a second is a mixed media painting (completed in 2007, and acquired by the Frye Art Museum).

In the Five Capital Punishments in China, each of the paintings draws on dozens of Western and Chinese paintings for inspirations and required extensive research and specific skillset. While details in each of the paintings are time-and-place specific, Lin purposely mixed them together to avoid specificity or singularity and to substitute universality – this could and does happen anywhere, everywhere, in China and beyond. In the same way, Lin enriches his canvases with a sort of formal-historical erudition, where motifs from the history of art suggest both the complexity and the continuity of human life.

=== Names of the Unremembered: Transcontinental (2009) ===
Collaborated with Daniel Boord and Luis Valdovino, Zhi Lin in the painting/video projection installation Names of the Unremembered: Transcontinental, focuses on 19th Century racism geared towards Chinese immigrant workers. The video in the piece was produced by Boord and Valdovino, and the oil on canvas painting was made by Lin. In the installation, Lin projects a video of two trains coming together on a 6.5 x 10 foot painting of the Transcontinental Railroad. The viewer hears train whistles blowing and sees the flag on Promontory Summit shake in the wind. This incorporation of movement suggests that the video projection of the two trains is a living embodiment of the Transcontinental.

Conversely, Lin's backdrop in Names of the Unremembered: Transcontinental is a colorless painting of a rocky foreground, the Transcontinental Railroad tracks, and the desert background. On each of the hundreds of rocks that precede the tracks, Lin painted a Chinese immigrant worker's name in red. Red, a symbol of blood, suggests that the lives of the workers were sacrificed in making the Transcontinental Railroad. The stones and the landscape are white, alluding to the desert scene as a white Chinese funeral. The somber painting is meant to offset the moving train projection and create a feeling of death and mourning.

=== In Search of the Lost History of Chinese Migrants and the Transcontinental Railroads (2017–2018) ===
Zhi LIN: In Search of the Lost History of Chinese Migrants and the Transcontinental Railroads was on view at Tacoma Art Museum from June 27, 2017 through February 18, 2018.

== Current ==
Lin is a Professor in the Painting and Drawing Program at the University of Washington, in Seattle, Washington.
In 2017, Lin was awarded the Robert McCauley Award for Painting by the Northwest Art Museum, and in the year 2000 he was awarded the Creative Capital Grant in the discipline of Visual Arts. Zhi Lin is represented by Koplin Del Rio, Culver City, California. Lin has been the recipient of many prestigious national and international recognitions, fellowships, and awards, including the Fellow in the Humanities Council and the Tang Center for East Asian Art at Princeton University, the University of Washington Royalty Research Scholar and Research Fund, Lila Wallace-Reader's Digest Artists at Giverny France Grant, Art Matters Foundation Fellowship, National Endowment for the Arts Visual Artist Fellowship in Painting, NEA/Midwest Regional Artist's Project Grant, Washington State Arts Commission Fellowship, Missouri Arts Council Visual Artists' Biennial Grant, and Delaware State Arts Council Individual Artist Fellowship. His works were reviewed and published by many national and international print and online media, among them the New York Times, the Philadelphia Inquirer, the Chicago Tribune, the Los Angeles Times, Artnews, Art in America, American Arts Quarterly, Artweek, American Artist Magazine, and Art Review.
