= Sherrill Roland =

African-American artist (born 1984)

- Born: 1984 (age 41–42); Asheville, North Carolina, U.S.
- Education: University of North Carolina at Greensboro
- Known for: The Jumpsuit Project

Sherrill Roland (born 1984) is an African-American artist best known for his The Jumpsuit Project, a performance-arts based project that challenges viewers to face the prejudices and judgements surrounding those incarcerated.

== Early life and education ==
Sherrill Roland was born in 1984, in Asheville, North Carolina. In 2009, he received a bachelor's degree in fine arts from the University of North Carolina at Greensboro. In 2013, while Sherrill Roland was a graduate student at the University of North Carolina at Greensboro, he was wrongfully accused of four felonies. Before an indictment was reached, he finished his first year of grad school. After nine months, the four felony charges were dropped to four misdemeanor charges. This caused Roland's case to be presented only in front of a judge, rather than with a jury as well. He was deemed guilty and served 10 months and two weeks at the D.C. Central Detention Facility. During that time, Roland missed the birth of his daughter and the death of his grandmothers.

Though Roland's art is not primarily religious, Roland is open about the fact that prayer and reading the Bible were things that helped him get by. While in prison, Roland initially struggled with the concept of innocence. He believed that he was different from the other men serving time at the D.C. Central Detention Facility. Through his conversations with the men there, and through religion, he came to realize that he is not as innocent as he believed and that no man is perfect; Roland recognized the judgements he had made about those who are incarcerated.

In 2016, his conviction was exonerated. Upon initially returning to North Carolina, Roland considered a career change and did not want to continue with art school. Roland found that being in jail had left him paranoid and distrusting of others. After talking to his professors about his transition period and his doubts about art, he realized that he can use art as a means of self-reflection and to bring his experiences incarcerated to light. For his master's in fine arts thesis project, Roland wore an orange jumpsuit every day on campus. During this performance art project, he documented his interactions and encounters with both peers and campus faculty. Roland created guidelines to follow for his thesis project that mimicked the rules he had to obey in prison. He thought of his studio space as his cell, and the art building as the block. When walking to and from places on campus, Roland couldn't stop and talk to people, or else he had to go back to his “block.” Over time, students and faculty at the university began responding to Roland; having conversations with him about his time incarcerated as well as sharing their own stories of loved ones who had been in the system. Roland also kept note of how people acted when seeing him in the orange jumpsuit, which included stares, side-eyes, and even people running away from him. In 2017, Roland received a master's degree in fine arts from the University of North Carolina at Greensboro. To conclude his art education, in 2018 Roland attended an art residency at the Skowhegan School of Painting and Sculpture in Skowhegan, Maine.

== Career ==
=== The Jumpsuit Project ===
The Jumpsuit Project is Sherrill Roland's current and ongoing, performance-arts based project. It's a continuation of the work he did for his master's thesis at the University of North Carolina at Greensboro; like his thesis project, he wears an orange jumpsuit to every performance. In Roland's Artist Statement for the 2020 South Arts Southern Grand Prize, he stated that his “practice addresses the complex construction of these three core identities: innocence, identity, and community; and reimagines their social and political implications in the context of the American justice system.” In The Jumpsuit Project's Project Statement, Roland also mentioned that, before he was incarcerated himself, his perceptions of prisons and those incarcerated were heavily influenced by how the media portrays criminal justice. In this project, he hopes to change people's perceptions of those imprisoned and end the stigma that surrounds the penal system.

Sherrill Roland travels around the United States to share his work and start a conversation surrounding the prejudices people have about incarceration. Like the performances he did for his thesis project, Roland follows the same rules he created, and has even added a few more since his work at the University of North Carolina at Greensboro. Now, when hosting talks and discussions as part of his performances, Roland tapes a 7×9 rectangle onto the floor of the space. This rectangle is a physical representation of the size of the jail cell Roland was in while serving time. For many performances and talks, he restricts himself to staying inside the perimeter of the rectangle while wearing the orange jumpsuit, and will only talk to audience members who step into the space with him. Roland will also set up “visitation booths”, where participants are able to converse with him in a more intimate and private manner. Audience members who partake in Roland's performances in this way (via stepping into the 7×9 rectangle or by talking to Roland at the visitation booths) are taking on the role of loved ones of those incarcerated. The Greensboro News & Record (a newspaper for Greensboro, North Carolina), when talking about the rules Roland follows in his performances, stated that “these rules are an inconvenience to Roland. But they are also disruptive to people trying to contact Roland. That’s the point.”

=== Selected performances ===
==== JumpsuitProjectDC ====
The JumpsuitProjectDC was a performance that spanned two days. On Wednesday, April 10, 2019, Sherrill Roland invited audience members and the public to the de La Cruz Art Gallery, at Georgetown University from 10:30 am to 3:30 pm to both listen in on him sharing his stories as well as invite participants to converse with him and share their own perspectives and accounts. On Thursday, April 11, Roland did something that he had never done for his performances before: include a six-mile walk. The walk started at the D.C. Central Detention Facility (where he was incarcerated) and ended at the de La Cruz Art Gallery. This performance was the first time Roland had returned to Washington, D.C. since he had been discharged from probation. Roland also encouraged the public to join him for one leg of the walk at the National Mall from 9:00 am to 10:00 am. Following the end of the walk, Roland performed The Jumpsuit Project in the de La Cruz Gallery in his signature taped off 7×9 rectangle. After the performance, Roland had an open dialogue session with Dr. Marc Marjé Howard, Georgetown University professor of government and law and director of the Prisons and Justice Initiative.

==== BKLYN Public Library ====
BKLYN Public Library took place at The Brooklyn Public Library in Brooklyn, New York City, New York, in 2017. This performance was a three-day event that took place from Tuesday, May 23, to Thursday, May 25. In this performance Roland changed throughout the three days from talking to participants through a visitation booth he set up, to talking to audience members in a taped 7×9 rectangle. During this event, participants were free to share their own experiences with Roland, who provided support and engaged in conversation with them, as well as listen to Roland's own similar experiences. For many, Roland's project is a chance to self-reflect, find support, and heal. His project is not only used as a means to show people that individuals who are incarcerated or who have been incarcerated are not how many stereotype them as, but also emphasizes the injustices in the criminal justice system and how it impacts those who are either in the system or have loved ones who are.

=== Other works ===
Performance art is not the only type of art Sherrill Roland has produced since being released from prison. He also makes installation art, sculptures, and mixed media works. Similar to The Jumpsuit Project, he uses these other mediums to draw attention to the criminal justice system in the United States. In an interview with former classmate Patricia Daigle from Number: Inc (an art journal), Roland said that while in prison, he “saw some of the most creative things being made by people who did not refer to themselves as artists or what they were doing as art making… Now that I’m out of prison, I have all the resources in the world, but I still want to keep the integrity of that experience.”

His mixed media series ArtforUS Issues, consists of multiple collages Roland made out of materials that were accessible in jail, including paper (some of which that Roland made by stirring ramen noodle seasoning into a dye and dying Mylar), kool-aid, markers, letters from friends and family, and issues of Artforum International he was sent by his family. The text overtop of these collages are only in three different colors: black, red, and blue. Stories and quotes from his experiences in prison are seen in blue, inspirational quotes are in red, and biblical passages are in black. The collages also picture sketches he drew in prison, which range from cartoons to an image of his grandmother, who died while he was incarcerated. These very personal collages allow the viewer to see inside Roland's psyche during this period of time.

Fig Leaf on Cell #7 is a sculptural piece at the Harvey B. Gantt Center for African-American Arts + Culture that consists of a large number 7 on a large pane of plexiglass. On the glass there is also a piece of toilet paper with sharpie text over it. The piece is representative of how many inmates use water to paste toilet paper onto the window of their cell to give themselves a little bit of privacy. On the piece of toilet paper are Roland's thoughts, written with the intention of it being for his daughter's mother. The writing provides an intimate insight on both his time in prison and how it affected his loved ones.

== Other activities ==
Outside of The Jumpsuit Project, Sherrill Roland talks to teenagers in juvenile detention centers and works with them on how to transition from a detention center to their homes and previous lives. On October 9, 2019, Roland met with inmates at the Mecklenburg County Detention facility in Charlotte, North Carolina. Roland told The Charlotte Observer that he hoped to show the young men how they can express their emotions towards the experiences they've had incarcerated and how they can tell their stories when they leave the detention facility. He also told The Charlotte Observer that while he was incarcerated, he felt alone, and that by meeting with youth inmates, he hopes to make them feel supported. In an interview with WUNC 91.5 North Carolina Public Radio, Roland mentioned that he aims to show these teens that there is more to life than what they are seeing behind bars. While at the Mecklenburg County Detention facility, Roland showed the teens his artwork and encouraged them to not only do something with their experience incarcerated, but to also go after things they want to do, no matter how far off those dreams may seem.

== Personal life ==
Roland will not disclose the crimes he was convicted of and keeps that information private when participating in discussions, lectures, panels, and interviews. He told The Charlotte Observer that discussing his charges would distract from the conversation about the correctional system in the U.S. he wants to incite.

== Collections ==
- Fountainhead, Miami, Florida
- The Studio Museum in Harlem, New York City, New York
- Harvey B. Gantt Center for African American Arts + Culture, Charlotte, North Carolina

== Awards, residencies, and fellowships ==
=== 2020 ===
- South Arts State Fellow and Southern Grand Prize Winner, South Arts, Atlanta, Georgia
- Betsy Sykes Award Winner, Raleigh Fine Arts Society, Raleigh, North Carolina

=== 2019 ===
- McColl Center for Art + Innovation Residency, Charlotte, North Carolina
- Fountainhead Residency, Miami, Florida.
- Right to Return Fellowship, SOZE agency, New York City, New York

=== 2018 ===
- Post-MFA Fellow in Documentary Arts, Duke University, Durham, North Carolina
