= Drew Beattie =

American painter and sculptor (born 1952)

Drew Beattie (born 1952 in Atlanta, Georgia) is an American painter and sculptor whose earlier work is part of the collaborative team Beattie & Davidson, and later work is characterized by post-kitsch material choices. Since 2013, Beattie has collaborated with the artist Ben Shepard on paintings, works on paper and sculpture.

After Beattie graduated from the Museum School in Boston in 1978, his work was shown in various institutional exhibitions in California and emerging galleries in New York. In 1989 Beattie met the painter Daniel Davidson at Berkeley, while pursuing a teaching post. Lawrence Rinder wrote: “In the summer of 1989 Drew Beattie and Daniel Davidson decided to try making a painting together. Impressed with the results, they continued working in tandem in...a "private laboratory." They were known for having a "single imagination" and a highly prolific, laboratory or factory-like experimental practice. The pair gained representation with Joseph Helman Gallery on 57th Street in New York after a residency at the American Academy in Rome where Beattie later served as president of the Society of Fellows from 2009 to 2014.

By the late nineties the Beattie & Davidson collaboration ended, and Beattie's work assumed a different tenor as grids and hexagonal patterns of colored shapes began to disappear from his paintings. There was also a gradual transition into highly dimensional painting and post-kitsch sculptural practices, which have been the subject of many reviews and acclaim. Since his intensified solo practice he has held posts at some of the major art programs in the United States including Harvard, UC Berkeley, the University of Chicago, Cooper Union, and Hunter College.

Beattie's work has been the subject of numerous solo and group exhibitions at Leo Castelli Gallery, The Drawing Center, the Brooklyn Museum, the San Francisco Museum of Modern Art, the Museum of Contemporary Art San Diego, the Berkeley Art Museum, the Corcoran Gallery of Art, PS1, the High Museum of Art Atlanta, and many others.

Beattie's 2012 exhibition at Hansel and Gretel Picture Garden, "My Cookie" was the first in which his sculpture appeared publicly.

Since 2013, Beattie has been working with Ben Shepard. Their work has been shown in Brooklyn at Storefront Ten Eyck, and The Chimney. In 2018, a show of DBBS works on papers "Office Riot" appeared in Konstanz and Frankfurt at Lachenmann Gallery.

== Books ==
- Rinder, Lawrence. "Drew Beattie & Daniel Davidson, Matrix / Berkeley, Twenty Years 1978-1998". Berkeley, CA: Berkeley Art Museum, 1998.
- Humphrey, David. "Weedy Snowball: David Humphrey Talks with Beattie & Davidson, Beattie & Davidson". Santa Monica, CA: Smart Art Press, 1998.
- Rinder, Lawrence. “Beattie & Davidson". Santa Monica, CA: Smart Art Press, 1998.
