= Mike Robinson (soccer) =

American soccer player (1958–2021)

Personal information
- Date of birth: March 2, 1958
- Place of birth: Philadelphia, Pennsylvania, U.S.
- Date of death: May 27, 2021 (aged 63)
- Position: Forward

Senior career*
Years	Team	Apps	(Gls)
1980	Philadelphia Fury	4	(0)
- * Club domestic league appearances and goals

Michael James Robinson (March 2, 1958 – May 27, 2021) was an American soccer forward who played one season for the Philadelphia Fury in the North American Soccer League.

== Biography ==
Robinson was the starting striker for the 1974 & 1975 North Catholic PCL Champions. Robinson scored the first goal in the ’75 PCL final to help North defeat St Joe's Prep by a score of 2–1 in Overtime. In ’75 he also led the Falcon squad to a City title by scoring 2 goals in the first 15 minutes on the way to a 4-0 Falcon victory over Roxborough High School. He was voted 1st team All-Catholic in 1974 & 75. Robinson was also an All-Scholastic selection after his senior season.

He was recruited out of NC by NSCAA Hall of Famer Tom Fleck to play College soccer at Lehigh University. Robinson was a star athlete from the 1977 through the 1980 season. He still ranks #2 All-time in goals scored during his career at Lehigh with 41. He also played on the 1978 Lehigh squad that was 12–2–3, which is the 2nd highest in winning percentage all-time at Lehigh for one season.

Robinson died at his home on May 21, 2021, at the age of 63.
