= Patrick Clancy =

Patrick Clancy may refer to:

- Patrick Clancy (Irish politician) (1877–1947)
- Pat Clancy (trade unionist) (1919–1987)
- Paddy Clancy (1922–1998)
- Patrick Clancy, husband of Lindsay Clancy, perpetrator of the Killing of the Clancy children
