= Gregory Sale =

American artist

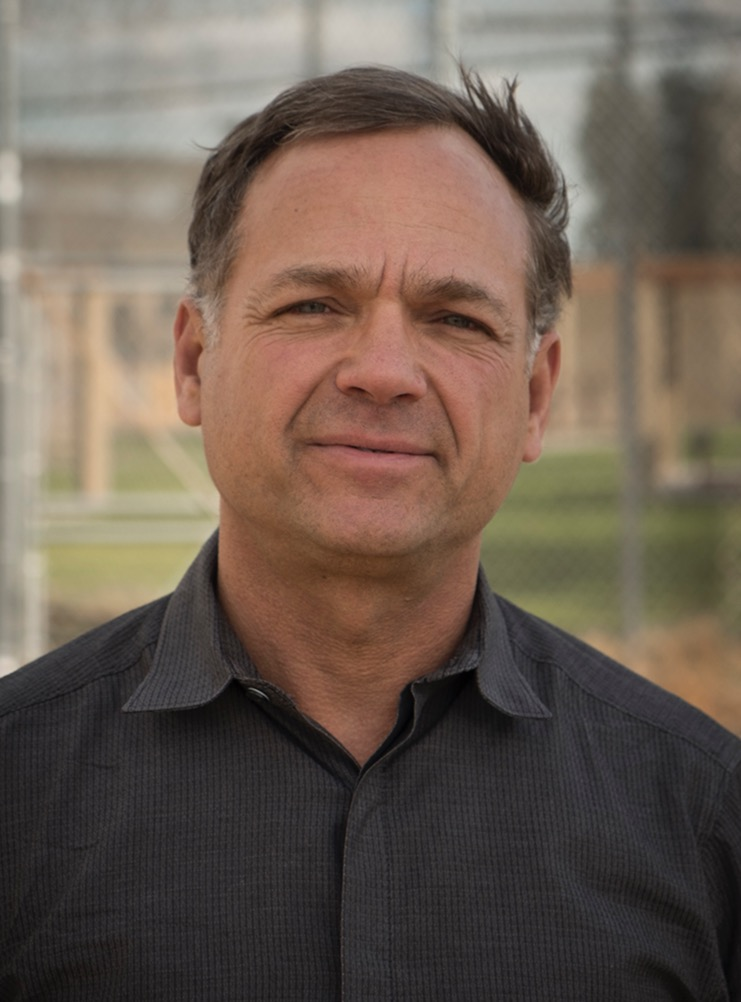
- Born: 1961 (age 64–65)
- Education: BFA Virginia Commonwealth University; MFA University of Arizona
- Known for: Socially Engaged Art
- Notable work: Future IDs at Alcatraz, It's not just black and white
- Movement: Social justice, justice reform
- Awards: Creative Capital, Kenneth Rainin Foundation, A Blade of Grass/David Rockefeller Fund Fellowship in Criminal Justice, Art Matters, The Andy Warhol Foundation for the Visual Arts Grant

Gregory Sale (born 1961) is a socially engaged, multidisciplinary artist, educator, and advocate. Collaborating with individuals and communities on aesthetic responses to social challenges, Sale creates and coordinates large-scale and often long-term public projects that are organized around collective experiences. Participants become creative co-producers focused on collective artistic experiences that identify, address, and transform lives. With the commitment of a wide range of constituencies and institutions, his creative practice includes projects with primary partners in activist circles, social service agencies, non-profit organizations, and government. His most prominent and continuing projects focus on issues of mass incarceration, illuminating the complexities of justice, democracy, and how we practice care as a society.

Based in Phoenix and Los Angeles, Sale is an Associate Professor of Expanded Arts and Public Practice, School of Art, Herberger Institute of Design and the Arts, Arizona State University.

== Education ==
Sale received an MFA at the University of Arizona in Tucson, Arizona in 1995. In 1987 he received a BFA in Sculpture and a BA in French Literature from the Virginia Commonwealth University in Richmond, Virginia.

== Career ==
Sale is an Associate Professor of Expanded Arts and Public Practice, School of Art, Herberger Institute of Design and the Arts, Arizona State University. Sale began teaching in the School of Art Herberger Institute for Design and the Arts at Arizona State University as a Visiting Assistant Professor of Intermedia in 2007. He became an Assistant Professor of Intermedia and Public Practice in 2011, and in 2017 he was promoted to Associate Professor.

From 2000-2007, Sale served as the Visual Arts Director for the Arizona Commission on the Arts.

From 1997-2000 he served as the Curator of Education at the Arizona State University Art Museum in Tempe, AZ. From 1996-2000, Sale served as the Public Art Project Manager for the Phoenix Office of Arts and Culture in Phoenix, AZ.

His work has been supported by Creative Capital, Art Matters, the Andy Warhol Foundation for the Visual Arts Grant, the Kenneth Rainin Foundation, and A Blade of Grass/David Rockefeller Fund Fellowship in Criminal Justice.

== Notable works ==
As a socially-engaged artist, Sale brings together often opposed constituencies of the criminal justice system from incarcerated men and women, to survivors/victims and their families, to correctional officers and elected officials, to community members, media, and activists. He has developed partnerships with stakeholders spanning political positions from the far right – Joe Arpaio – to the far left – Angela Davis. His aim is to soften and collapse boundaries, thereby encouraging reciprocal dialogue and mutual learning. A somewhat quieter but no less political component of his work flirts with the fluid parameters of public and private love. Selected projects are listed below. For a full list of his projects, refer to his website.

=== Future IDs At Alcatraz (2018–19) ===
A yearlong, socially engaged art project, exhibition, and series of community programs at the infamous prison-turned-national park in San Francisco Bay began with a goal of translating criminal justice reform efforts into an artistic language capable of reframing the narrative of reentry after incarceration. As lead artist and project director, Sale worked with core project collaborators Dr. Luis Garcia, Kirn Kim, Sabrina Reid, and Jessica Tully to partner with the National Park Service and the Golden Gate National Parks Conservancy. They co-produced an exhibition that featured mural-sized, self-portraits made by justice-involved individuals, representing their stories of transformation and, importantly, self-determination. The exhibition also acted as a conceptual frame and container for the programmatic series, co-created with more than 20 partner organizations. Together, the exhibition and the programmatic series created an evolving civic space for open dialogue and stories of trauma, transformation, and resilience.

Reaching approximately 250,000 Alcatraz visitors, the project softened boundaries between artists, participants, and audience, allowing for mutual learning and identification to undo the social othering and cultural biases that often stigmatize individuals and communities. Future IDs at Alcatraz has been featured in over 50 publications, including The Economist in the review In America, art is helping prisoners adapt to life outside and in exhibitions across the US and internationally, including This is America | Art USA Today, Kunsthal KAdE, The Netherlands. The project received support from Kenneth Rainin Foundation’s Open Spaces Program and A Blade of Grass/David Rockefeller Fund Fellowship in Criminal Justice, with artist residency awards from Montalvo Arts Center and Headlands Center for the Arts.

=== Rap Sheet to Resume (2015-2016) ===
14 individuals with conviction histories participated in professional development training and learned artistic strategies to expand how they perceive and present themselves. Together, the participants and Sale produced a public program for the Urban Justice Center which is an organization supporting New York City’s most vulnerable residents.

=== It's not just black and white (2011) ===
This project at the ASU Art Museum consciously wrestled with the visual motifs and clichés of crime (striped uniforms, chain gangs, pink underwear, and even brown skin) used by Arizona Sheriff Joe Arpaio while considering cultural, social and personal issues at stake in the day-to-day workings of the criminal justice system. What began as a collaboration with 14 men incarcerated, eventually grew to 52 related events, 37 institutional and community partners, and reached nearly 20,000 visitors. The purpose of the project was to expose and examine the many conflicting viewpoints, perspectives, and values that give rise to serious considerations of justice and public safety.

=== Touching Revolution(2015) ===
Performed through virtual platforms such as Skype, this project brought together activists, artists, and communities to create a platform for reform in the criminal justice system to confront and rethink issues. Participators for the event virtually dialed in from all over the country.

=== Beware! Artwork Ahead! (2012) ===
A proposal for visible tomorrows which is a project that is designed to disrupt the social mechanisms on an individual level that often appear to destine the youth for a life of incarceration behind bars. Sale led the workshop to deliver the message that incarceration does not have to be the future for the youth in foster homes, those with a criminal record, and those that are homeless, each of which puts the child at higher risk for being put in a cell later along in life.

=== Love for Love(2012-2015) ===
A series of projects designed to describe the word love without using love to describe it. Due to love being such a complex word with several different opinions ranging from person to person, it often is hard to define and take seriously for certain people. The series has emerged as a social justice project, a social political campaign to foster dialogue, promote awareness of less visible segments of society, and show acceptance and tolerance among the population.

=== Things We'd Rip Off(2008) ===
This project was done on the campus of Arizona State University, where Sale teaches. He interviewed different colleagues in the art department through a survey in which they were supposed to reflect what they believe students should be taught. The conversation sparked a conversation on the values that support individual artistic practice while also questioning values of to contemporary art school training.

== Grants, Commissions, Residencies and Awards ==
2016

- Lucas Visual Arts Fellowship and Artist Residency, Montalvo Arts Center, Saratoga, CA

2015

- SPArt (Social Practice Art) Grant, Anti-Recidivism Coalition, Los Angeles, CA
- Artist-in-Residence and Artwork Commission, Urban Justice Center, New York, NY
- Artist Residency, Headlands Center for the Arts, Sausalito, CA

2014

- Artist Residency and NEA Fellowship, MacDowell Colony, Peterborough, NH
- Artist Residency, Yaddo, Saratoga Springs, NY
- Jane and Alan Lehman Foundation award through Phoenix Art Museum, Phoenix, AZ

2013

- Creative Capital Grant in Emerging Fields, Creative Capital Foundation, New York, NY
- Art Matters Grant, Art Matters Foundation, New York, NY

2012

- Artist Residency, Yaddo, Saratoga Springs, NY
- Artist Residency/Fellowship, Virginia Center for Creative Arts, Amherst, VA
- North Carolina Arts Council Project Grant through Ackland Art Museum, University of North Carolina, Chapel Hill, NC

2011

- Social Studies Artist-in-Residence with support from the Andy Warhol Foundation for the Visual Arts through ASU Art Museum, Tempe, AZ
- Mural Arts’ Restorative Justice Program Guest Teaching Artist/Maximum-Security Prison Teaching Volunteer, with support from Ford Foundation and Pennsylvania State Correctional Institution at Graterford, Philadelphia, PA
- Artist Residency, CAMAC Centre d'Art Marnay Art Centre with support from Ténot Foundation, Marnay-sur-Seine, France
- Mid-Career Artist Award, Contemporary Forum, Phoenix Art Museum, Phoenix, AZ
- 2008 Percent for Art Commission, City of Glendale Public Art, Glendale, AZ Percent for Art Commission, Scottsdale Public Art, Scottsdale, AZ
