= Jina Valentine =

American artist (born 1979)

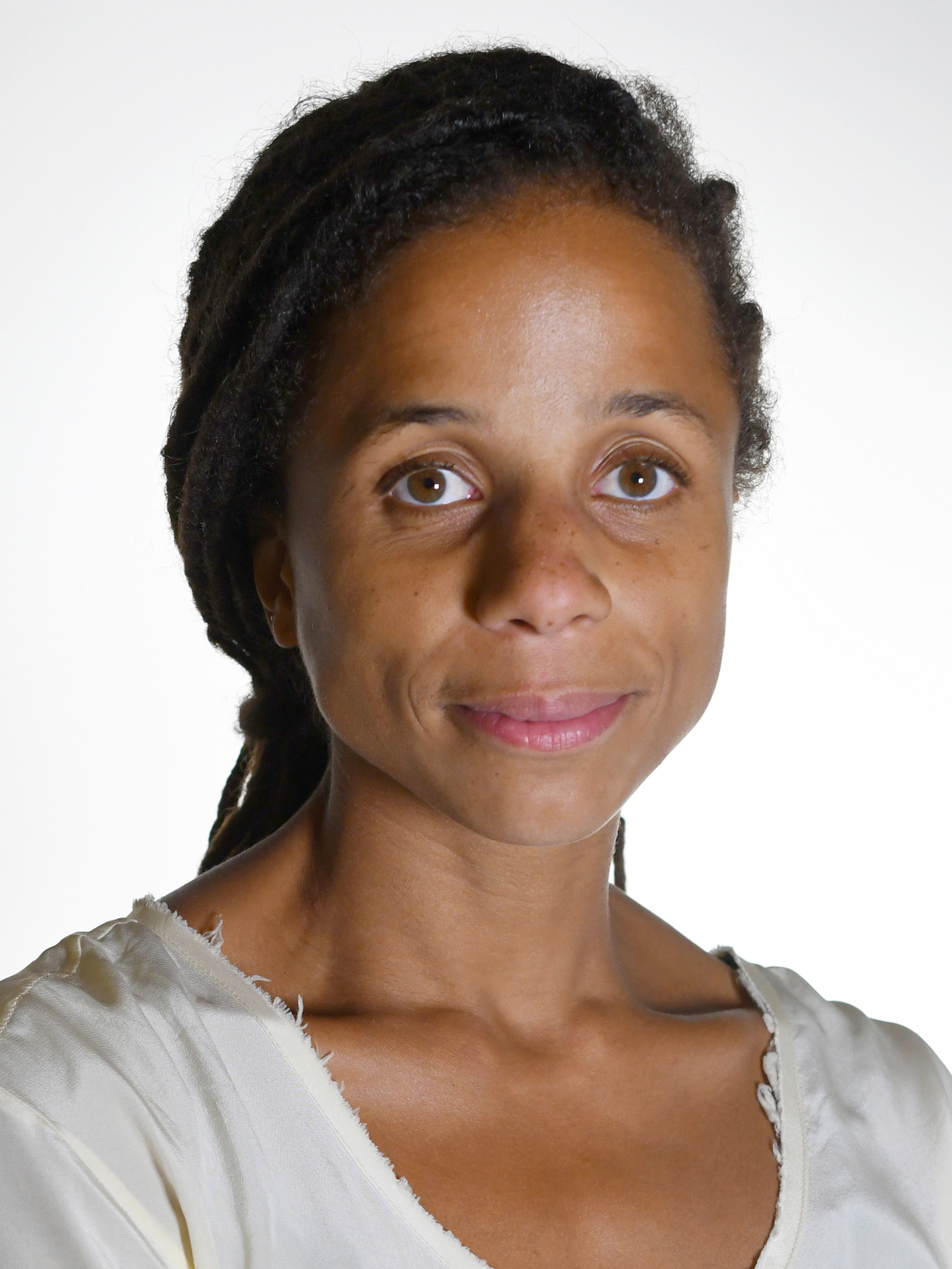
- Valentine in 2017
- Born: November 9, 1979 (age 46); Berwyn, Pennsylvania
- Education: Stanford University; University of Pennsylvania, California College of the Arts

Jina Valentine (born November 9, 1979, in Berwyn, Pennsylvania) is a contemporary American visual artist whose work is informed by the techniques and strategies of American folk artists. She uses a variety of media to weave histories—including drawing, papermaking, found-object collage, and radical archiving.

== Education ==
Valentine received an MFA from Stanford University after studying at University of Pennsylvania and California College of the Arts. She received a BFA from Carnegie Mellon University and also studied in France at the Lacoste School.

== Career ==
Valentine is based in Chicago, where she is a Professor of Printmedia at School of the Art Institute of Chicago. Previously, she was an Assistant Professor of Art at UNC Chapel Hill. Valentine has exhibited at venues including The Drawing Center, the Studio Museum in Harlem, the CUE Foundation, the Elizabeth Foundation, Patricia Sweetow Gallery, Fleisher-Ollman Gallery, Marlborough Gallery, Ogilvy Gallery, and 21C Museum Hotel (Durham, North Carolina).

She has participated in residencies at the Atlantic Center for the Arts, Women's Studio Workshop, Sculpture Space, the Skowhegan School of Painting and Sculpture, the Santa Fe Art Institute, and the Cité internationale des arts in Paris.

In 2011, Valentine published Ticket to the Unknown, a translation the works of Swiss outsider artist Aloise Corbaz. The book was published as part of Steffani Jemison's Future Plan and Program, a project to publish literary works by visual artists of color.

She has received a Joan Mitchell MFA Grant, a San Francisco Arts Commission Fellowship, and a Creative Capital Emerging Fields Award. Her art has also been featured on the cover of Southern Cultures, Summer 2015.

Valentine co-founded Black Lunch Table with artist Heather Hart in 2005. The ongoing project creates an oral archive, salons and Wikipedia edit-a-thons.
