= Mitch Cope =

American artist

Mitch Cope (born 1973) is an artist and art gallery curator from Detroit, Michigan.

Cope works as an artist and curator in Detroit. In 2001 he co-founded the Tangent Gallery. Cope has been involved with the Shrinking Cities Project in Berlin, the Power From Nature project with artist Marjetica Potrc.

He has exhibitioned his art throughout Detroit at venues such as Susanne Hilberry Gallery, and at the KW Institute for Contemporary Art and Subspace Gallery and the Kunsthaus Dresden in Germany. His collaborative art project "Detroit Tree of Heaven Woodshop" is permanently installed at the World Workers Museum in Steyr, Austria. In 2005, Cope became the first American artist to officially travel on a U.S. Embassy Cultural Envoy to Ashgabat, Turkmenistan, where he traveled throughout the country lecturing about his work, and visiting and working with Turkmen artists on a joint American-Turkmen exhibition.

Most recently, Cope was involved in the foundation and planning of the new Museum of Contemporary Art Detroit where he also filled the role of Assistant Curator until March 2007. Currently, Cope is working with the Detroit Tree of Heaven Woodshop, founded 2005 with artists Ingo Vetter and Annette Weisser, with commissions from the Noguchi Museum, Shrinking Cities Project, and the Van Abbemuseum. He is also the co-owner of Design 99, a retail space for design, art and architecture in Hamtramck.
