= Karina Aguilera Skvirsky =

Latin-American -artist

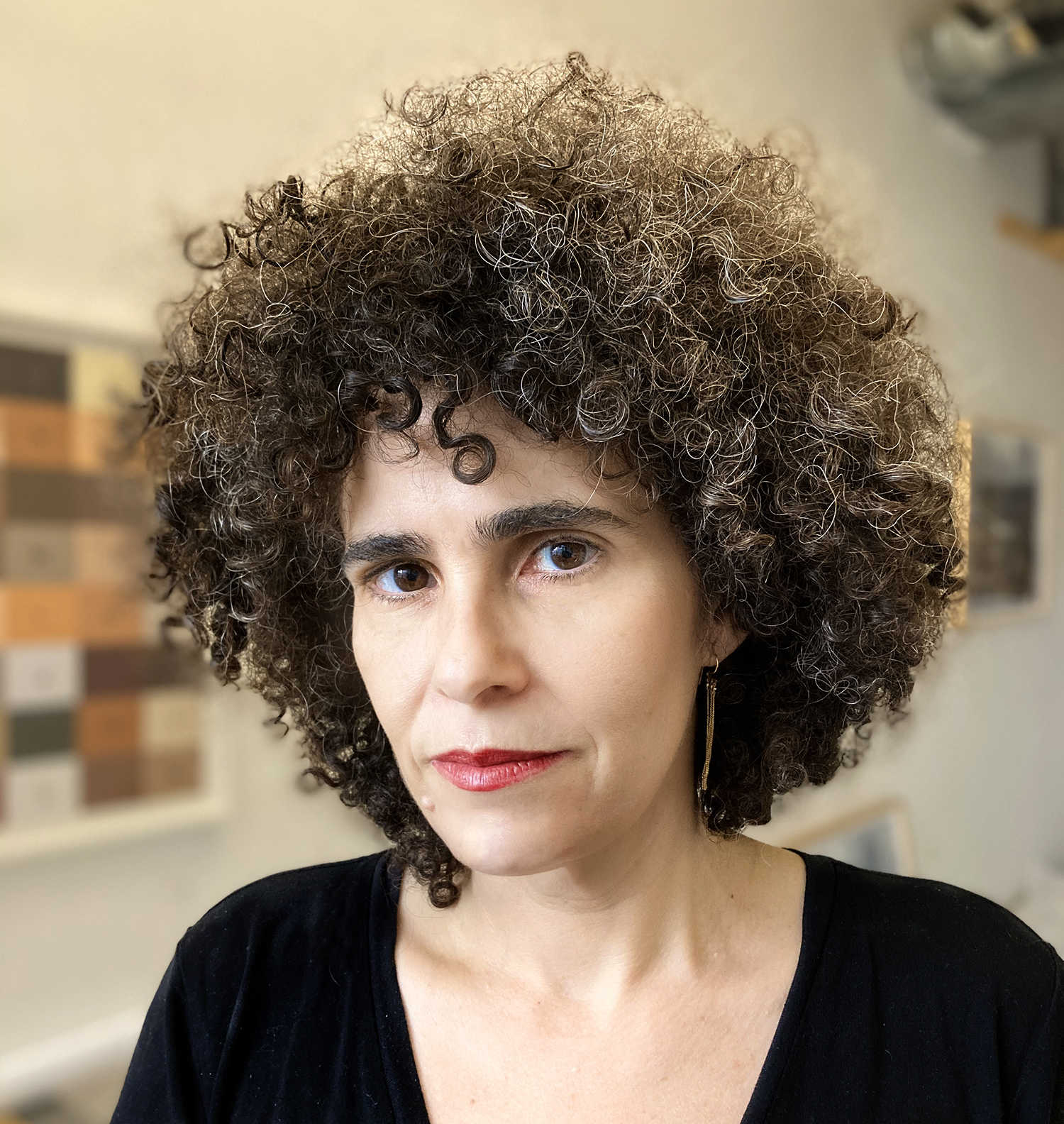
- Karina Aguilera Skvirsky
- Born: Providence, Rhode Island
- Education: Oberlin College (BA); Indiana University Bloomington (MFA)
- Known for: Performance, photography, video
- Notable work: The Perilous Journey of María Rosa Palacios (2019)
- Awards: Creative Capital Award (2019); NALAC Visual Arts Grant (2018); Jerome Foundation NYC Film & Media Grant (2015)
- Website: Official website

Karina Aguilera Skvirsky is a multidisciplinary artist based in New York, New York. Her work is held in the permanent collections of the Brooklyn Museum, the New York Public Library, the Art Institute of Chicago, and the Whitney Museum, among others. Working across video, performance, and photography, Aguilera Skvirsky addresses themes of migration, colonization, Latin American identity, and family history. Aguilera Skvirsky is best known for her performance video The Perilous Journey of María Rosa Palacios (2019).

== Early life and education ==
Aguilera Skvirsky was born in Providence, Rhode Island to an Ecuadorian mother and a father of Eastern European Jewish descent. As a child, she lived between the Eastern United States and Guayaquil, Ecuador, where her mother was born. Skvirsky has said that the contrast between her memories of Ecuador and her life in the United States was central to her artistic practice.

Aguilera Skvirsky received her Bachelor's degree in Spanish literature from Oberlin College. In 1996, she received an Master of Fine Arts in Photography in 1996 from Indiana University Bloomington.

== Career ==
Aguilera Skvirsky's best known work is The Perilous Journey of María Rosa Palacios, a 30-minute-long video which documents a performance the artist did in 2019. In it, Aguilera Skvirsky retraces the overland journey of her great-grandmother, an Afro-Ecuadorian domestic who travelled to Guayaquil in 1906 before the railroad was completed in 1908. The video was shown in Impermanence: XIII Cuenca Biennial, curated by Dan Cameron, in 2016 and subsequently at Smack Mellon in New York. In 2020, the work was featured in a solo exhibition at Galería Vigil Gonzales, Sacred Valley, Peru.

In 2011, Aguilera Skvirsky participated in a residency at the Laundromat Project in which she collected oral histories of downtown Jersey City through a local laundromat.

In 2017, Aguilera Skvirsky had a solo exhibition entitled The Folds in the Photograph/Los pliegues en la foto at DPM Gallery in Guayaquil, Ecuador.

In 2019, Aguilera Skvirsky received an award from Creative Capital to support the production of a performance-documentary entitled How to build a wall and other ruins as well as Sacred Geometry, a series of photographic collages. These works explore the symbolic power of stone in Inka and Cañari cultures in Ecuador through the ruin site of Ingapirca and contemporary discourse about Latin American colonization and archaeology. How to build a wall and other ruins premiered at the XV Cuenca Biennial, curated by Blanca de la Torre, in Ecuador in late 2021.

== Exhibitions ==
A selection of other exhibitions of Aguilera Skvirsky's work includes:

- 2004 - From the Woolworth; Drawing Room, Jessica Murray Projects, Brooklyn, New York
- 2006 - Backyards; curated by Eric Heist, Momenta Art, Brooklyn, New York
- 2006 - S-Files; curated by Deborah Cullen and Marysol Nieves, Biennial exhibition, El museo del barrio, New York, Travelled to: Museum of Art of Puerto Rico, San Juan, Puerto Rico
- 2007 - 50,000 Beds; The Aldrich Contemporary Art Museum, Ridgefield, Connecticut
- 2007 - Interpreting Utopia; curated by Brian Wallace and Ariel Shanberg, Samuel Dorsky Museum, New Paltz, New York
- 2009 - Playlist; curated by Rodolf Kronfle-Chambers and Cristóbal Zapata, Galeria Proceso, Guayaquil, Ecuador
- 2010 - Memories of Development; curated by Rodrigo Quijano, La Ex-Culpable, Lima, Peru
- 2010 - There is always a cup of sea for man to sail: The 29th São Paulo Biennial; curated by Moacir dos Anjos and Agnaldo Farias, São Paulo, Brazil
- 2012 - Southern Exposure; curated by Rodolfo Kronfle-Chambers, DPM Gallery, Guayaquil, Ecuador
- 2013 - Bloomfield Avenue Hotline; collaboration with Liselot van der Heijden, Bloomfield College & Montclair Museum of Art, Montclair, New Jersey
- 2014 - Proposals for an Ecuadorian Pavilion in Venice; Hansel & Gretel Picture Garden, New York, New York
- 2014 - Drones; DPM Gallery, Guayaquil, Ecuador
- 2014 - Ready or Not 2014; curated by Shlomit Dror, Newark Museum Newark, New Jersey
- 2014 - Mercury Retrograde: Animated Realities; Galerijca Galzenica, Zagreb, Croatia
- 2014 - Becoming Male; curated by Erin Lopez-Riley, Freedman Gallery Center for the Arts, Albright College, Reading, Pennsylvania
- 2015 - The Daily Grind; curated by Cassandra Getty, Museum London, London, Ontario
- 2015 - Contornos: Desenredando el Museo; curated by Eduardo Carrera, Centro de Arte Contemporaneo, Quito, Ecuador
- 2015 - Remnants; curated by Fernando Baena, Galeria Proceso, Cuenca, Ecuador
- 2015 - Story of a Story; curated by Shlomit Dror, Smack Mellon, Brooklyn, New York
- 2016 - Impermanence: XIII Cuenca Biennial; curated by Dan Cameron, Museo Pubapungo, Cuenca, Ecuador
- 2016 - Descent; curated by Charlotte Ickes, Institute of Contemporary Art, University of Pennsylvania, Philadelphia, Pennsylvania
- 2017 - The Perilous Journey of María Rosa Palacios; curated by Kathleen Gilrain, Smack Mellon Gallery, Brooklyn, New York
- 2017 - Where does the future get made?: Lishui Biennial Photography Festival; Lishui Museum of Art, Lishui, China
- 2017 - Folds in the Photograph/Los pliegues en la foto; DPM Gallery, Guayaquil, EC
- 2017 - Drones; Monmouth University Gallery, Monmouth, New Jersey
- 2017 - Exquisite Corpse; curated by Pinyol Ysabel, Mana Contemporary, Miami, Florida
- 2017 - Almost home: Between Staying and Leaving a Phantom Land; curated by Shlomit Dror, Dorsky Gallery, Queens, New York
- 2017 - Hacia donde Olmedo miraba; curated by Pilar Estrada, Ponce + Robles Gallery, Madrid, Spain
- 2018 - Africamericanos; curated by Claudi Carreras, Centro de la Imagen, Mexico City, Mexico, travelled to: Museo Amparo, Puebla, Mexico
- 2018 - Horizontes Errantes; curated by Eduardo Carrera, Centro de Arte Contemporáneo, Quito, Ecuador
- 2018 - Hybrid Topographies; curated by Monica Espinel, Deutsche Bank, New York, NY
- 2019 - Geometría Sagrada / Sacred Geometry; Museo Amparo, Puebla, Mexico
- 2019 - Geometría Sagrada / Sacred Geometry; Ponce + Robles Gallery, Madrid, Spain
- 2019 - Humboldt: Traspasar El Mito; El Centro Cultural Metropolitano de Quito, Quito, Ecuador
- 2019 - Styling Perspectives; curated by Alli Arnold, Natman Room, John Jay Sharp Building, BAM, Brooklyn, New York
- 2019 - Process; curated by Jeffreen Hayes, Handwerker Gallery, Ithaca College, Ithaca, New York
- 2019 - where we came from + where we are going; curated by Kimi Kitada, Transformer, Washington, DC
- 2020 - Los poemas que declamaba mi Mamá; Backroom, Museo Tamayo, Mexico City, Mexico
- 2020 - El Peligroso Viaje de María Rosa Palacios; Galería Vigil Gonzales, Sacred Valley, Peru
- 2020 - Sinergia 2.0; Proyecto Nasal, Guayaquil, Ecuador
- 2020 - Femme Fatale; NADA online: FAIR; Kunstraum LLC, New York
- 2020 - Diálogos, Frieze Online: Geometría Sagrada; curated by Rodrigo Moura and Susanna Temkin, El museo del Barrio, New York
- 2020 - Lo que dejamos fuera / What we leave out; Galería Vigil Gonzales, Lima, Peru
- 2021 - XV Bienal de Cuenca, Bienal de Bioceno: Cambiar el Verde por Azul; curated by Blanca de la Torre, Museo de la Ciudad, Cuenca, Ecuador
- 2021 - Raiz; curated by Eduardo Carrera and Jorge Sanchez, Centro de Arte Contemporáneo, Quito, Ecuador
- 2021 - Flash Point; curated by Pilar Estrada, Ponce + Robles Gallery, Madrid, Spain
- 2022 - Las piedras están vivas; Ponce + Robles Gallery, Madrid, Spain
