= Heather Hart =

American visual artist (born 1975)

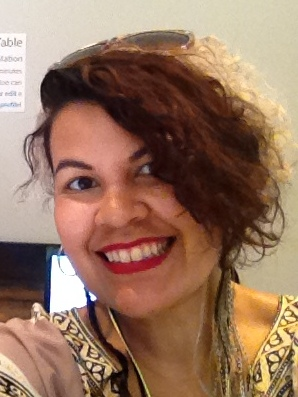
- Hart in August 2014
- Born: May 3, 1975 (age 51); Seattle, Washington U.S.
- Education: Rutgers University
- Known for: Performance; Multimedia; Social practice Collage
- Website: Heather-Hart.com

Heather T. Hart (born May 3, 1975) is an American visual artist who works in a variety of media including interactive and participatory Installation art, drawing, collage, and painting. She is a co-founder of the Black Lunch Table Project, which includes a Wikipedia initiative focused on addressing diversity representation in the arts on Wikipedia.

== Early life ==
Hart was born in Seattle, Washington, to Susan Hart and Harry H. Hart III, a carpenter. Her parents met as students at an art school in Oakland, California. She grew up in North Seattle.

In 1998, Hart received a BFA from Cornish College of the Arts in Seattle, where she majored in Painting and Video. She attended the Center for African American Studies at Princeton University in New Jersey. In 2008, Hart received an MFA from Mason Gross School of the Arts at Rutgers University in New Jersey, where her focus was interdisciplinary art.

== Career ==
Hart learned carpentry from her father at a young age. Hart uses architectural forms mixed with family and oral histories, multiple narratives, and participatory engagements as integral components in much of her creative work.

Hart's "Rooftop Oracles" is a series of life-size rooftops, which look as though they were dropped from the sky or emerging from the ground, offer viewers an interactive experience as they climb onto and under the structures. She has created different installations in the series, and realizes her vision with the collaboration of family and friends, in a sort of raising the roof effort that involves many people working together as a community.

In 2010, Hart created the installation, "The Northern Oracle: We Will Tear the Roof Off the Mother," at Franconia Sculpture Park in Minnesota.

In 2012, her sculptural installation, "The Eastern Oracle: We Will Tear the Roof Off the Mother," was presented at the Brooklyn Museum as part of their Raw/Cooked series.

"The Western Oracle: We Will Tear the Roof Off the Mother," was an installation at Seattle Art Museum's Olympic Sculpture Park in 2013. It included an elk-hide drum wall that was built in a tetris of rectangles as a way to sound out the ritual of the oracle. Indian-American drum maker, Joseph Seymour, provided instruction on creating the drums, with installation consultation from Cornish College furniture professor, Attila Barcha.

From May to November 2017, "Outlooks: Heather Hart" is installed at Storm King Art Center in Mountainville, New York.

== Black Lunch Table ==
Hart is co-founder of the Black Lunch Table Project, a radical archiving project, which was awarded a 2016 Emerging Fields Grant from Creative Capital. The Black Lunch Table Project is an ongoing project created by Hart and co-founder and collaborator Jina Valentine. The project, which started in 2005, when both Hart and Valentine were artists in residence at Skowhegan School of Painting and Sculpture, provides a format where participants can come together to consider contemporary issues of race, archiving, and the under representation of minority artists in the art historical canon, often taking on the form of Wikipedia editathons.

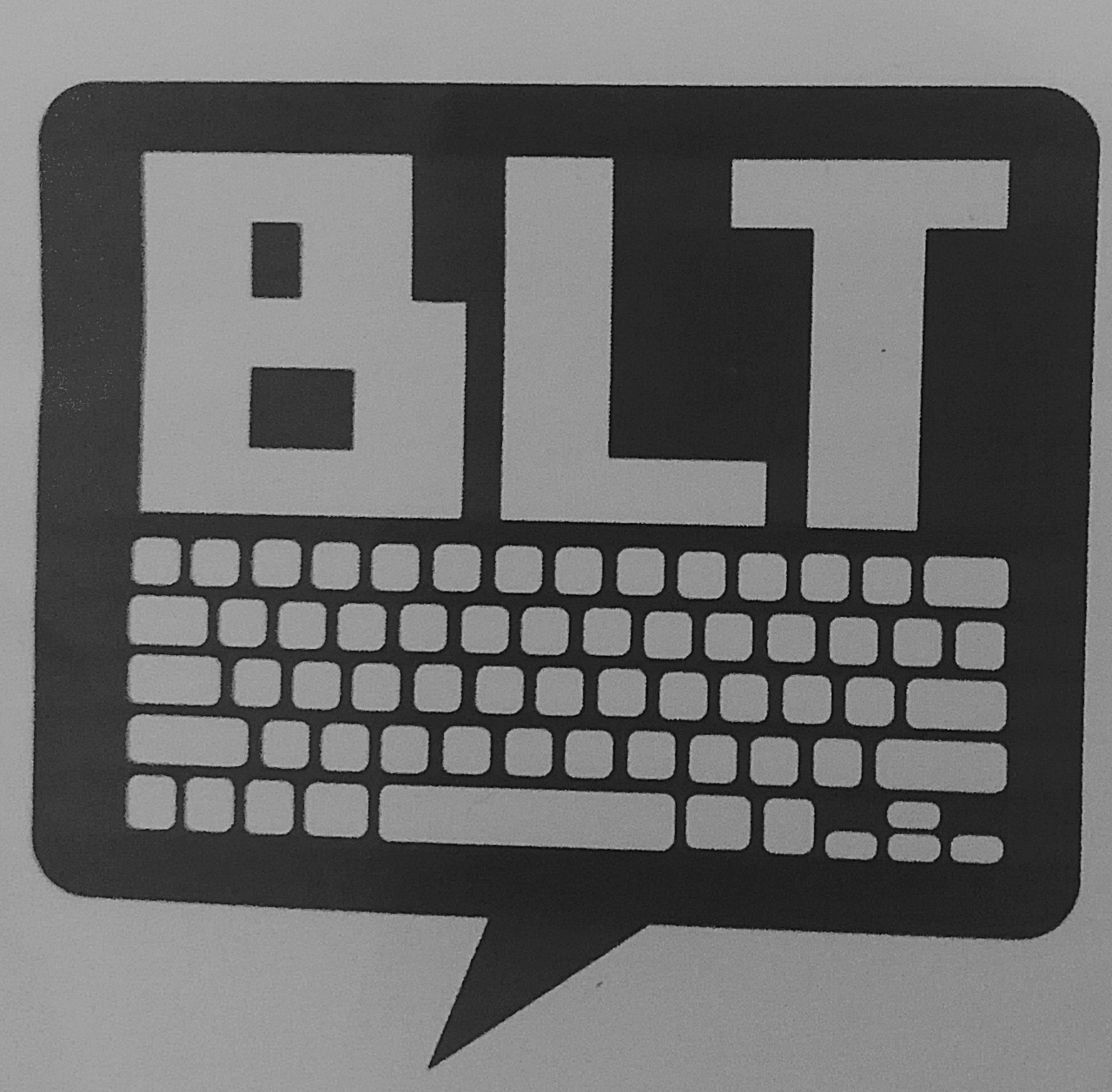
Black Lunch Table

== Personal life ==
In 2012, she was diagnosed with breast cancer, which she successfully recovered from, during her first solo show at the Brooklyn Museum.

Hart currently lives and works in Brooklyn.

== Honors ==
Artist in Residencies

- 2005: Skowhegan School of Painting and Sculpture (Madison, ME)
- 2006: Santa Fe Art Institute (Santa Fe, NM), Joan Mitchell Foundation Grant for Artist in Residence
- 2008: Whitney Museum of American Art, Whitney Independent Study Program, Visual Program
- 2010: Franconia Sculpture Park (Franconia, MN), FSP/Jerome Fellowship for Artist in Residence
- 2014: Bemis Center for Contemporary Arts (Omaha, NE)
- 2015: Joan Mitchell Foundation (New Orleans, LA), Residency
- 2016: McColl Center for Visual Art (Charlotte, NC)

Awards

- 2006: Socrates Sculpture Park, Emerging Artist Fellowship
- 2009: New York Foundation for the Arts, NYFA Fellowship
- 2011: Jerome Foundation, Jerome Travel Grant
- 2013: Joan Mitchell Foundation, Painters and Sculptors Grant
- 2026: American Academy in Rome, Rome Prize

== Exhibitions ==
Hart's work has been exhibited worldwide including Olympic Sculpture Park, Real Art Ways, 92YTribeca, Jersey City Museum, NYU Galleries, 2B Gallery in Budapest, Rush Arts Gallery, Portland Art Center, Soil Art Gallery, Studio Museum in Harlem, Islip Art Museum, Museum of Art and Craft in Japan, and Art in General. She has collaborated in pieces by Pablo Helguera and Raphael Ortiz. Her work has been included in exhibitions curated by Kara Walker, Fred Wilson, Deborah Willis and Hank Willis Thomas.

- 2006: Socrates Sculpture Park, New York City Department of Parks and Recreation (Astoria, Queens) – Emerging Artist Fellowship Exhibition, 2006 (EAF06). "Color Was Given Me As A Gage"
- 2008: Rutgers University, Paul Robeson Galleries (Rutgers, NJ) – "Neo-Constructivism: Art, Architecture, and Activism"
- 2012: Brooklyn Museum (Brooklyn, NY) – Raw/Cooked. "The Eastern Oracle: We Will Tear the Roof Off the Mother"
- 2015: Practice Gallery (Philadelphia, PA) – Practice Oracle
- 2015: Elsewhere (Greensboro, NC) – The Porch Project: Black Lunch Tables
- 2017: Storm King Art Center (Mountainville, New York) – Outlooks: Heather Hart, May 13, 2017 to November 12, 2017

== Works and publications ==
Chronological order

- Aranda-Alvarado, Rocío (2007). "Heather Hart". The Feminine Mystique: Contemporary Artists Respond. Jersey City, NJ: Jersey City Museum. OCLC 708253029. – Catalog of an exhibition held at the Jersey City Museum in New Jersey from Sept. 20, 2007-Feb. 24, 2008
- Veneciano, Jorge Daniel, ed. (2008). Neo-Constructivism: Art, Architecture, and Activism. New Brunswick, NJ: Paul Robeson Galleries, Rutgers, The State University of New Jersey. ISBN 978-0-979-51672-6. OCLC 316855979. – Catalog of the exhibition held at the Paul Robeson Galleries and the New Jersey School of Architecture Gallery, January 31-April 10, 2008
- Han, Heng-Gil (2008). Jamaica Flux '07: Workspaces & Windows. Jamaica, NY: Jamaica Center for Arts & Learning. pp. 28–30. ISBN 978-0-976-28536-6. OCLC 262737521. – Companion exhibition at JCAL, September 29, 2007 – January 12, 2008
- Petrovich, Dushko; White, Roger, eds. (2012). "Heather Hart". Draw It with Your Eyes Closed: The Art of the Art Assignment. Brooklyn, NY: Paper Monument. ISBN 978-0-979-75754-9. OCLC 780604353.
- Hart, Heather; Jemison, Steffani; Valentine, Jina (25 October 2012). "The Present Classification" (PDF). Skowhegan Journal. Skowhegan, ME: Skowhegan School of Painting and Sculpture: 8–10.
- Hart, Heather; Jemison, Steffani; Valentine, Jina; Sigal, Lisa; Drawing Center (New York, N.Y.) (2014). The Intuitionists. New York: Drawing Center. p. 8. ISBN 978-0-942-32487-7. OCLC 884617785. – Catalog of an exhibition held at The Drawing Center, Main Gallery / The Lab, July 11-August 24, 2014
