= Michael Robinson (Canadian artist) =

Canadian artist

- Born: 1948; Toronto, Ontario
- Died: 2010 (aged 61–62)
- Education: Sheridan School

Michael Robinson (1948–2010) was a Canadian artist, glassblower, and poet who investigated Indigenous, spiritual, and environmental themes.

== Biography ==
Michael Robinson was born in Toronto, Ontario, on 27 March 1948. Trained at Sheridan College's School of Design (Glass Major, 1969–1971), Robinson was an artist, glassblower, printmaker, and writer. He exhibited widely throughout Ontario, but also nationally (British Columbia, Alberta, Quebec, Newfoundland) and internationally (United States, Switzerland, Germany), and he received several national and provincial awards, as well as grants. Robinson died on 28 July 2010 in Peterborough Ontario.

== Permanent collections ==
Robinson's work resides in the permanent collections of the following institutions:

- Canadian Museum of History
- Royal Ontario Museum
- McMichael Gallery
- Thunder Bay Art Gallery
- Glenbow Art Institute in Calgary
- Canada Council Art Bank
- Aboriginal Affairs and Northern Development Canada Aboriginal Art Collection, Government of Canada
- Art Gallery of Perterborough

== Published works ==
- Freedom of Silence, 1988, ISBN 0-9692185-2-4
- The Earth and the Dancing Man, 1991, ISBN 0-9695225-0-9
- Touching the Serpent's Tail, 1992, ISBN 0-9695225-1-7
- A Bird Within A Ring of Fire, 1998, ISBN 0-9695225-3-3
