= Christopher Robbins (artist) =

American artist

- Born: 1973 (age 52–53); Georgia
- Website: http://www.christopher-robbins.com

Christopher Robbins is an American artist that focuses his art practice in the realm of public art and social sculpture. Robbins works internationally, using physical and conversational processes to create interactions between strangers in order to build community and problem-solve.

== Education ==
Robbins completed a BA at the University of Virginia and pursued an MA at Rhode Island School of Design (RISD) and Pratt.

== Career ==
Robbins has also worked at RISD, volunteered with the Peace Corps in Benin and West Africa and is on faculty at The State University of New York at Purchase as a Professor in the Visual Arts Conservatory.

=== Exhibitions ===
Christopher Robbins has exhibited at Nikolaj, Copenhagen Contemporary Art Center, the Queens Museum of Art, Eyebeam Art and Technology Center, CCS Bard, the Dumbo Arts Festival, chashama 20 West 53rd Street, and LAND/ART New Mexico.

The Ghana Think Tank, which Robbins co-founded in 2006, has exhibited at the Venice Biennale of Architecture, ZKM | Museum of Contemporary Art, New Museum Festival of Ideas, FACT - the Foundation for Arts and Creative Technology, Museum Arte Util, the Shenzhen and Hong Kong Bi-City Biennale of Urbanism and Architecture, the Art Museum of the Americas, and the National Museum of Wales.

=== Organizations ===
As part of his art practice, Robbins has founded several organizations:

In 2006, he co-founded the Ghana Think Tank, a growing network of think tanks from Ghana, Cuba, El Salvador, Mexico, Iran, Afghanistan, Serbia and the US prison system, who work to solve problems in the “developed” world. While initially developed as an art project, the Ghana ThinkTank has begun to have influence outside the art world as well.

In 2010, he founded WPA 2010 as a response to the US Government’s failure in the face of the 2008 economic crisis. WPA 2010 was a functional but illegitimate Work Projects Administration, in which US citizens took over the US Government’s WPA brand to pay unemployed people to complete public works projects.

=== Awards ===
Robbins has been awarded residencies/ fellowships from MacDowell Colony, Skowhegan, Haystack Mountain School of Crafts, Penland School of Crafts and Anderson Ranch Arts Center.

He has received grants and awards from the Puffin Foundation, CEC Arts Link, and the New York State Council on the Arts.

He co-founded the Ghana ThinkTank (2006), and has received awards from Creative Capital, Black Rock Arts Foundation, CEC Arts Link, and Creative Time.
