= Rebecca Warren =

British visual artist and sculptor (born 1965)

Rebecca Warren OBE RA
- Born: 1965 (age 60–61); Pinhoe, Exeter
- Education: Goldsmiths
- Known for: Sculpture

Rebecca Jane Warren OBE RA (born 1965) is a British visual artist and sculptor, born in Pinhoe, Exeter. She is particularly well known for her works in clay and bronze and for her arranged vitrines. The artist currently lives and works in London.

== Early life ==
From 1989 to 1992, Warren studied Fine Art at Goldsmiths' College, University of London receiving a BA (Hons). She then attained a Masters in Fine Art from Chelsea College of Art & Design, London (1992–93). From 1993 to 1994 she was an artist-in-residence at the Ruskin School, Oxford University, Oxford.

== Work ==
Rebecca Warren, Girl 38, 2003, reinforced clay and twig on painted MDF plinth 88 x 57 x 81 cm – 34 5/8 x 22 1/2 x 31 7/8 inches.

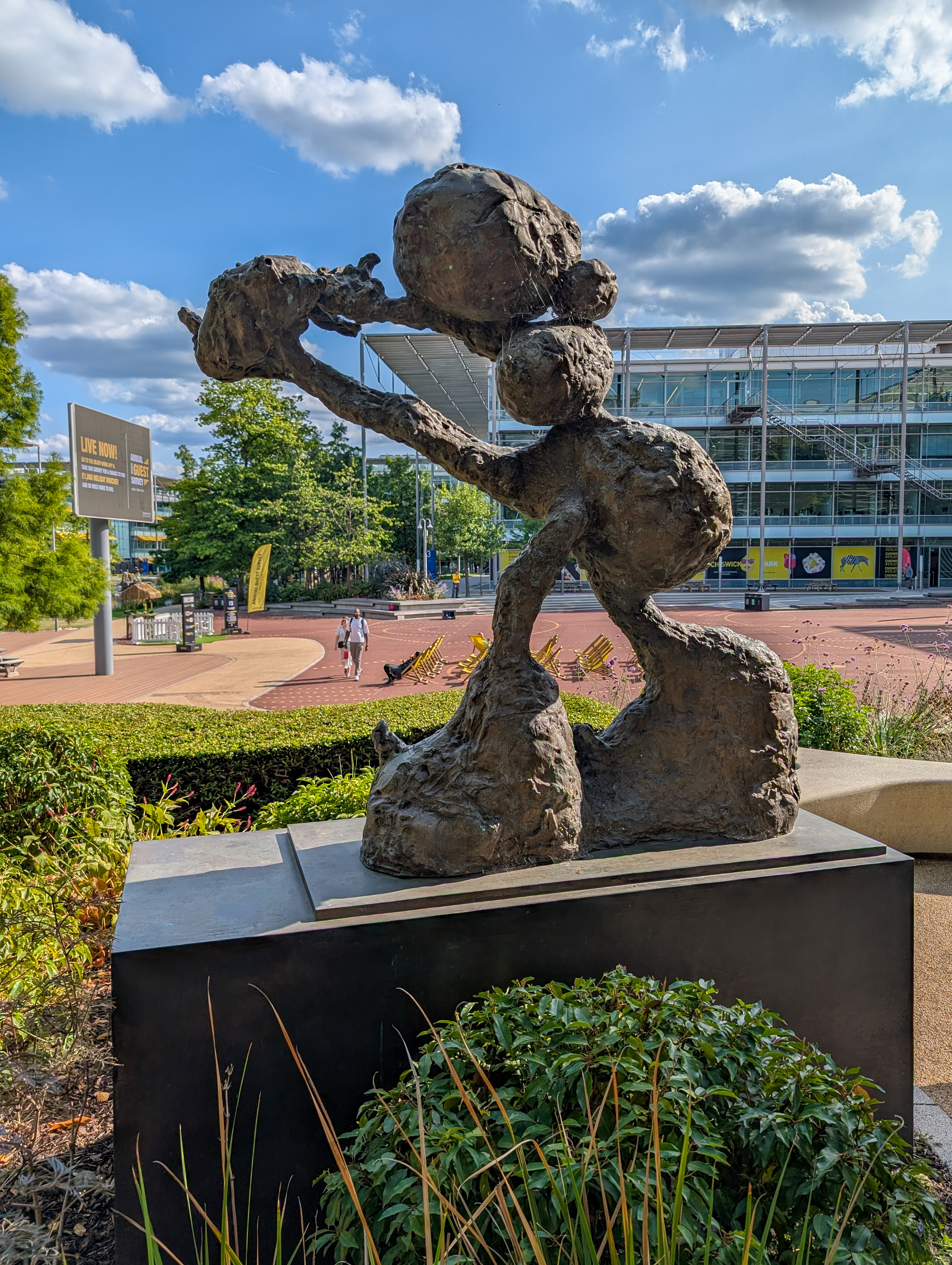
Large Concretised Monument to the Twentieth Century, at Chiswick Business Park

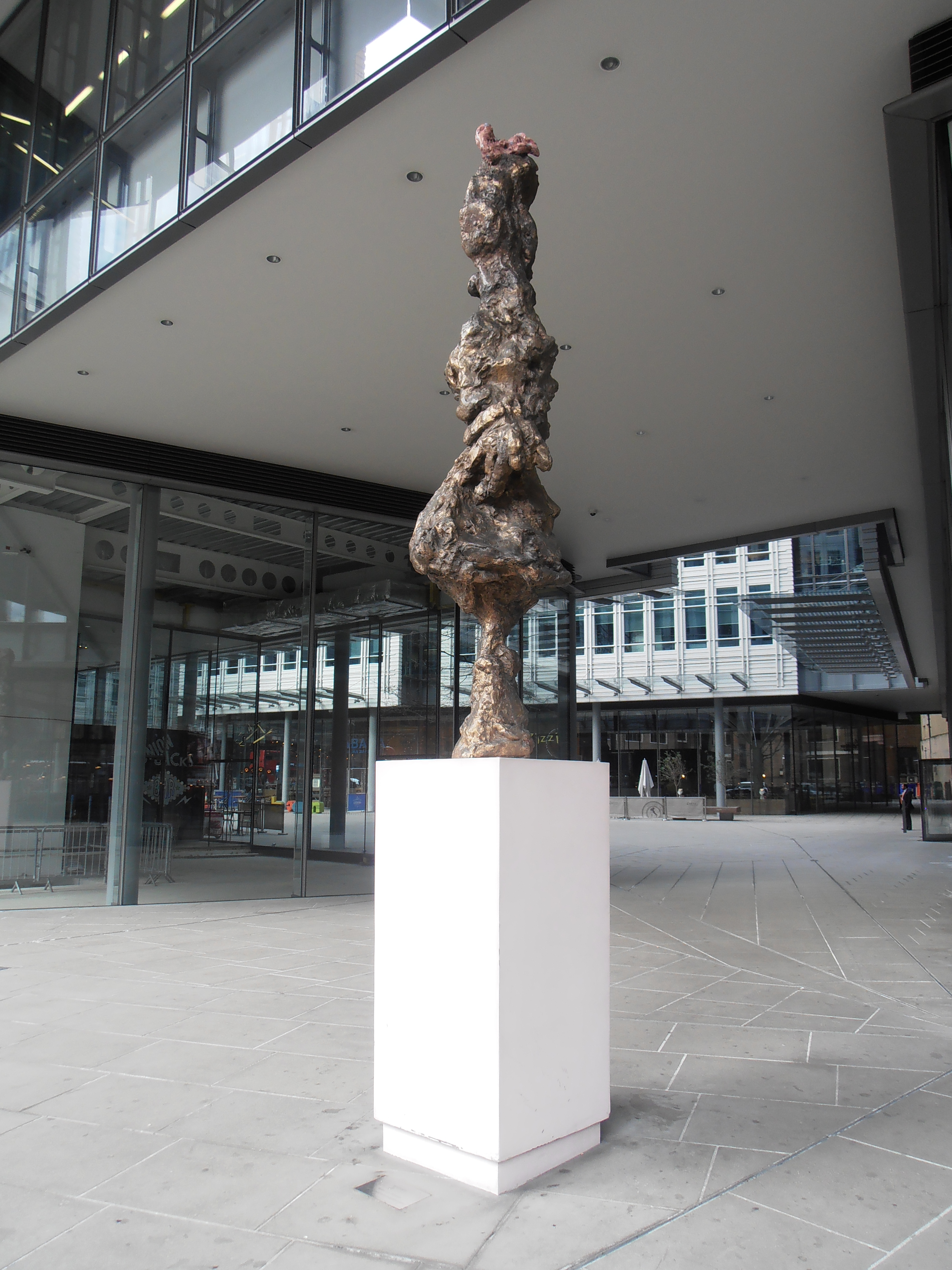
William in Central Saint Giles, Camden

Until 1997 a large part of Warren's output was produced as a collaboration with artist Fergal Stapleton.

Warren's early sculptures were made primarily using clay. These pieces often depicted the nude female form and tackled themes of sexuality by making reference to other historical works and artists. For instance, Warren's early works have referenced artists as diverse as Robert Crumb, Edgar Degas, and Alberto Giacometti.

Warren's more recent works have included more sculptures made in metal media such as bronze and steel. In 2009, the artist exhibited her first work in welded steel at her exhibition entitled Feelings. In 2009 the Serpentine Gallery exhibited the first major solo survey of her work. In 2010, The Renaissance Society, in collaboration with the Art Institute of Chicago, presented Warren's first solo exhibition in an American museum.

Also in 2014, she was made a Professor of Painting and Sculpture at the Kunstakademie Düsseldorf

=== Select solo exhibitions ===
- The Boiler Room, Saatchi Gallery (2003)
- Dark Passage, Kunsthalle Zürich (2004)
- Rebecca Warren, Serpentine Galleries (2009)
- Rebecca Warren, Art Institute of Chicago and the Renaissance Society (2010)
- Rebecca Warren: The Main Feeling, Dallas Museum of Art (2016)

== Public collections ==
The artist's work can be found in a number of public collections, including:

- Tate
- Museum of Modern Art

== Recognition ==
In 2006, Warren was nominated for the prestigious Turner Prize for her sculptural installations in solo shows at Matthew Marks Gallery, New York, and Galerie Daniel Buchholz, Cologne, as well as her work in the Tate Triennial 2006. A representative of the Tate Gallery wrote, "Her works combine a wide range of sources with a strong formal awareness, injecting conventional materials with a sensual physicality to create something wholly new." The other artists nominated in 2006 were Tomma Abts, Mark Titchner, and Phil Collins.

On 12 March 2014 Warren was elected a member of the Royal Academy of Arts. She was appointed Officer of the Order of the British Empire (OBE) in the 2020 Birthday Honours for services to art.
