= Tomma Abts =

German-born visual artist

- Born: 26 December 1967 (age 58); Kiel, West Germany
- Known for: Painting

Tomma Abts (born 26 December 1967) is a German-born visual artist known for her abstract oil paintings. Abts won the Turner Prize in 2006. She currently lives and works in London, England.

== Early life and education ==
Abts was born in 1967 in Kiel, Germany, to a teacher in a primary school and a gynecologist. Between 1989 and 1995 Abts attended the Hochschule der Künste Berlin. She has been living in London since 1995, and maintains a studio in Clerkenwell, which she has occupied since first coming to London on a grant. It was only in 2002 that she was able to live solely from her paintings.

== Work ==
Starting each of her works without a preconceived idea, knowing only the size of the canvas and her materials, Abts works in acrylic and oil, often building up her designs from repetitive geometrical elements. Her style can be classified as abstract, but also in opposition to Germany's Neo-Expressionist figurative painting. None of her paintings are representational. There are no references to nature, the world or any other theme. The abstraction in her paintings is supported by the lack of detail and an overall retro feel. The paintings involve complex shapes that are layered and woven in different ways with added highlights, shadows and sense of depth.

Abts used to work on canvasses of all sizes. Since the early 2000s, all of Abts' paintings are 48 x 38 centimeters and the titles of her paintings are derived from a dictionary of German first names. She has said that this is the size and style that works for her. Each work takes on a color scheme that is rich and somewhat neutral. The colors are not obviously vibrant and work with each other's tones within each work of art. Abts creates a 3D effect by continually and meticulously layering and working up each painting. The works are thickly painted, almost over-painted, which gives a hint of something created by trial and error. It seems as though the layers of paint could be covering up something underneath the finished product. "Abts approaches each canvas without preconception, building up layers of paint until a form crystallizes." Abts takes a long time to produce her works, and she is not prolific. She also has begun to translate her paintings into prints, particularly with the Crown Point Press in San Francisco, California.

== Recognition ==
Abts is the winner of the 2006 Turner Prize, awarded by the Tate in London. The Tate Gallery praised "her rigorous and consistent approach to painting" and added "Through her intimate and compelling canvases she builds on and enriches the language of abstract painting." The other artists on the shortlist in 2006 were Rebecca Warren, Phil Collins, and Mark Titchner. Abts was the first female painter to win the award.

== Exhibitions ==
=== Solo exhibitions ===
- habitat, Kings Road, London (1998)
- greengrassi, London (2021, 2016, 2012, 2006, 2002, 2000)
- Galerie Giti Nourbakhsch, Berlin (2004, 2001)
- The Wrong Gallery, New York (2003)
- Galerie Buchholz, Koln (2006, 2003)
- Galerie Giti Nourbakhsch, Berlin (2009, 2004)
- Douglas Hyde Gallery, Dublin (2005)
- Kunsthalle Basel, Switzerland (2005)
- Galerie Daniel Buchholz, Koln (2006)
- Kunsthalle zu Kiel, Kiel, Germany (2006)
- David Zwirner, New York (2008)
- New Museum, New York (2008)
- Kunsthalle Düsseldorf, Düsseldorf (2011)
- greengrassi, London (2011)
- Galerie Buchholz, Berlin (2013)
- David Zwirner, New York (2014)
- Aspen Art Museum, Colorado (2014)
- "Tomma Abts: Four New Etchings", Crown Point Press, San Francisco (2015)
- David Zwirner, New York (2019)

=== Selected group exhibitions ===
- filmcuts, Galerie neugerriemschneider, Berlin (1995)
- Fast, 520 King Street West, Toronto (1996)
- The Vauxhall Gardens, Norwich Art Gallery, Norwich (1998)
- Honey, I rearranged the collection and Origin of Parties, greengrassi, London (2003, 1998)
- Limit Less, Galerie Krinzinger, Wien (1999)
- Etcetera, Spacex Gallery, Exeter (1999)
- Egofugal 7th International Istanbul Biennial, Istanbul (2001)
- The Devil is in the Detail, Alliston Skirt Gallery, Boston (2001)
- Tomma Abts & Vincent Vecteau, Marc Foxx Gallery, Los Angeles (2002)
- Quodlibet II and Mullberg and Richard Hawkins & Tomma Abts, Lecia Dole-Racio, Morgan Fisher, Galerie Daniel Buchholz, Koln James Hayward (2009, 2004, 2002)
- Hot, Blue & Righteous, Galerie Giti Nourbakhsch, Berlin (2003)
- deutschemalereizweitausenddrei, Frankfurter Kunstverein, Frankfurt (2003)
- Black Rainbow, Lucky Tackle, Oakland, California (2003)
- journal #7 with Vincent Fecteau, Van Abbemuseum, Eindhoven (2004)
- Formalismus. Moderne Kunst heute, Kunstverein Hamburg, Hamburg (2004)
- 54th Carnegie International, Carnegie Museum of Art, Pittsburgh (2004–2005)
- British Art Show 6, Hayward Gallery, London: (Wanderausstellung) (2005)
- Of Mice and Men, 4th Berlin Biennale for Contemporary Art (2006)
- Hyper Design, 6th Shanghai Biennale, Shanghai Art Museum, Shanghai (2006)
- Turner Prize: A Retrospective, Tate Britain, London (2007)
- Turner Prize: A Retrospective, Moscow Museum of Modern Art (2007)
- Turner Prize: A Retrospective, Mori Art Museum, Tokyo (2007)
- The Gallery, David Zwirner, New York (2008)
- The Symbolic Efficiency of the Frame, 4th Tirana Biennial, Tirana, Albania (2009)
- Slow Paintings, Museum Morsbroich, Leverkusen, Germany (2009)
- At Home/Not at Home: Works from the Collection of Martin and Rebecca Eisenberg, CCS Bard Hessel Museum of Art, Annandale-On-Hudson, New York (2010)
- The Indiscipline of Painting Tate St. Ives touring to Warwick Art Centre (2011/12)
- Stand still like the hummingbird, David Zwirmer, New York (2012)
- Painting Now: Five Contemporary Artists, Tate Britain, London (2013)

== Collections ==
Abts' work is represented in public collections internationally, including:

- the Art Institute of Chicago,
- the Carnegie Museum of Art, Pittsburgh, Pennsylvania,
- the Hammer Museum, Los Angeles,
- the Museum of Modern Art, New York,
- the San Francisco Museum of Modern Art,
- the Staatsgalerie Stuttgart,
- the Tate Gallery, London, and
- the Walker Art Center, Minneapolis, Minnesota.

== Art market ==
Abts is represented by Galerie Buchholz, Cologne/Berlin/New York, greengrassi, London and by David Zwirner, New York.

== See also ==
- List of German women artists
- List of German painters
