= Artscribe =

British contemporary art magazine (1976–1992)

- editor: Marjorie Allthorpe Guyton
- Former editors: James Faure Walker; Matthew Collings; Stuart Morgan
- Categories: Contemporary art
- Frequency: Bi-monthly
- Founded: 1976
- Final issue: January 1992
- Company: Hale
- Country: United Kingdom
- Based in: London
- ISSN: 0954-4178
- OCLC: 471632626

Artscribe (1976–1992), titled Artscribe International from 1985, is a defunct British contemporary art magazine. It was notable for its commitment in the late 1970s and early 1980s to abstract art, and for giving popular art critic Matthew Collings his first break into contemporary art. The magazine was published on a bi-monthly basis.

== Founding and early years ==
Artscribe was started in 1976. Its founding editor was the sculptor Ben Jones with the critic and painter James Faure Walker. Ben Jones retired from publishing to concentrate on making art and moved on after a few years.) Faure Walker had been a regular contributor to Studio International which had begun to concentrate on conceptual art. Faure Walker and Jones conceived the new magazine as a showcase of new British and American abstract modernist painting and sculpture as typified by the work of Patrick Heron. Contributors included Adrian Searle, Terence Mulloon, and Stuart Morgan. In this first phase under Faure Walker, Artscribe was distinguished by the lively intelligence of its writing, with a certain range—early content included a long interview with artist R.B. Kitaj (an outspoken champion of figuration) and a sophisticated description of the performance art scene in the United States and Europe by Stuart Morgan. But the main focus was on purely visual issues: To this day there is no equivalent in art publishing.

== Changes in the 1980s ==
In the early 1980s neo-expressionism epitomized by the work of Julian Schnabel, Anselm Kiefer, Jörg Immendorff, Francesco Clemente, and Steven Campbell had gained international attention. This kind of art was considered by powerful people in the art world to be loaded with important content that somehow transcended the visual dimension. Faure Walker rejected this view, and his scathing analysis of this mindset in art in an article on the 1981 exhibition A New Spirit in Painting co-curated by Nicholas Serota and Norman Rosenthal, made Artscribe appear out of step with contemporary trends. In 1983 Faure Walker left the magazine to pursue his painting career and Matthew Collings, who had worked on various aspects of its production since 1979, took over as editor.

Collings made the magazine's content more international, leading to the name change—which was introduced in 1985 when ownership of Artscribe passed on to a retired American couple, Pat and Jack Butler, who had homes in London, New York and Florida. Their financing enabled Artscribe to become a colour glossy. Collings continued his policy of internationalism, bringing in articles and reviews from the United States and continental Europe to mix with coverage of British art. He also set up a group of contributing editors based abroad, and persuaded high-profile artists to make unique cover-images and 'artist's pages' for the magazine. These included glamorous figures of the moment such as George Condo, Julian Schnabel, Markus Lüpertz, Albert Oehlen, Werner Büttner, Jean-Michel Basquiat, Eric Fischl and Nancy Spero, but also worthy Brits, such as Art & Language, Hannah Collins, Ian McKeever and Gerard Hemsworth. In 1987 Collings received a commendation for his transformation of Artscribe from the Turner Prize jury (other art-world figures singled out for commendation that year were Nicholas Serota, soon to be director of the Tate). Collings was fired as editor by the owners later that year after an argument with one of the office staff. (He went on to write and present popular TV programmes on art and now combines TV work with painting.)

== Decline and demise ==
Collings's successor Stuart Morgan was a highly respected art writer who freelanced for various publications, including Artscribe, Art Monthly and Artforum. He also played an influential role in the UK as a curator. (He was, for example, the first champion in the UK of American sculptor Louise Bourgeois, organizing a retrospective of her work as early as 1985 at London's Serpentine Gallery.) If the Faure Walker phase of Artscribe was intelligently visual and mostly local, the Collings phase inspired but scrappy and fervently international, the Morgan phase was comparatively conventional. This was not because of any lack of originality on the new editor's part but simply because the contemporary art scene generally was by now becoming much more homogenized. If any art magazine wished for an appeal wider than an academic pamphlet it was impossible to survive if you didn't aspire to a certain expected overall smoothness. Morgan's personal voice was distinctive but all art magazines that concentrated on the cutting edge now had similar values, looked similar, had the same ads and shared the same writers. Morgan soon gave up the editorship in favor of curating and writing and after some years withdrew from the art world because of illness. Morgan died in 2002 from the rare neurological disease Lewy Body Syndrome. A collection of his writings, What the Butler Saw (published by Frieze magazine) appeared to acclaim in 1996.

By 1991 the downturn in the international art market affected Artscribe's advertising revenue, and it was sold to Hale a company that published glossy home interiors magazines while another editor Marjorie Allthorpe Guyton was installed. The format was changed again and the cover price was doubled with the consequence that subscriptions were undervalued. The final issues included notable articles on Jannis Kounellis and Damien Hirst by artists Jon Thompson and Liam Gillick but the decline was terminal and the magazine ceased publication in January 1992.
