= Drawing Center =

Museum in Manhattan, New York

The Drawing Center
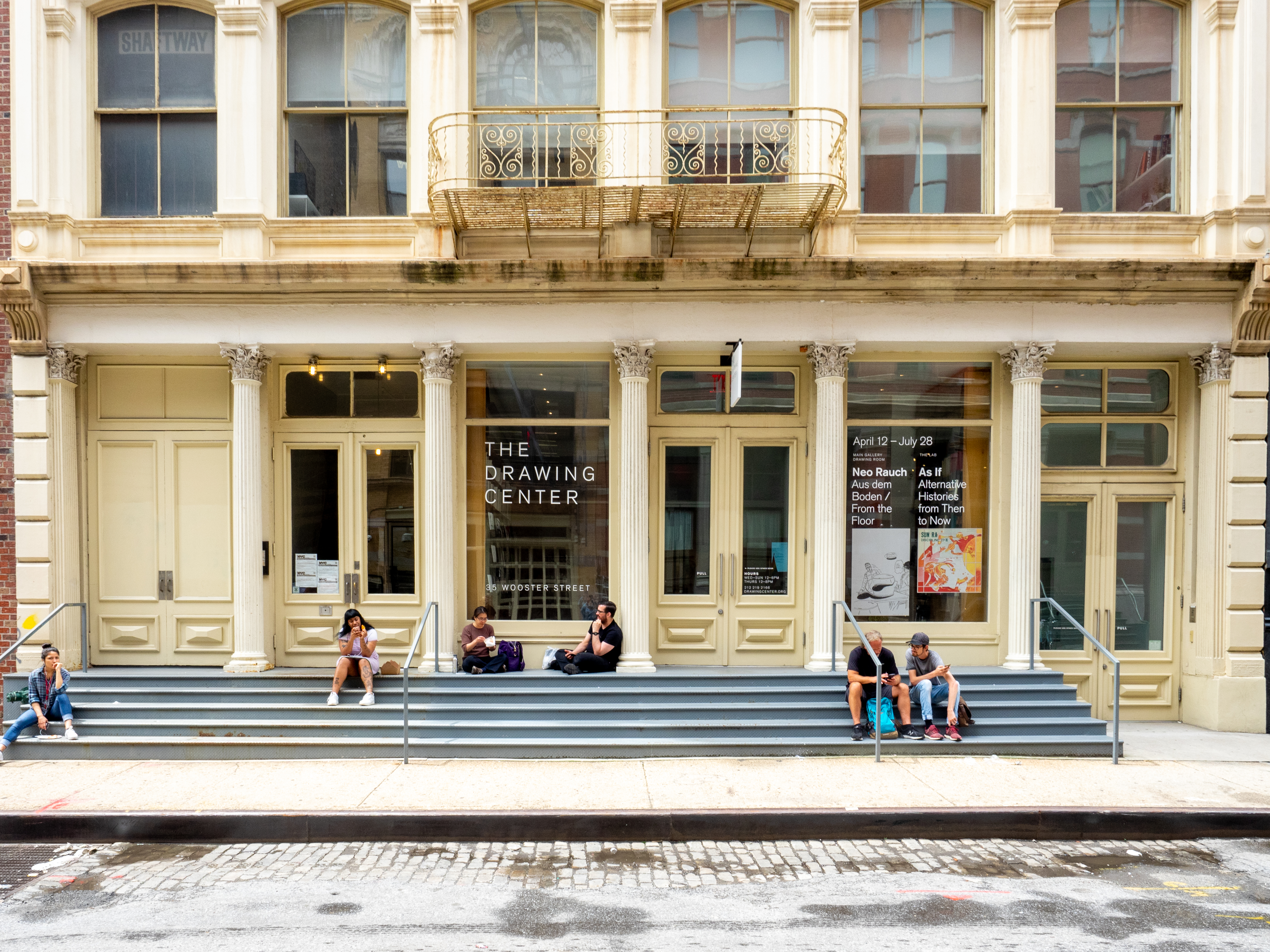
- The Drawing Center at 40 Wooster Street
- Established: 1977
- Location: 35 Wooster Street, New York, NY 10013
- Coordinates: 40°43′21″N 74°00′10″W
- Type: Art, Special Interest
- Director: Laura Hoptman
- Website: www.drawingcenter.org

The Drawing Center is a museum and a nonprofit exhibition space in Manhattan, New York City, that focuses on the exhibition of drawings, both historical and contemporary.

== History ==
The Drawing Center was founded by former assistant curator of drawings at the Museum of Modern Art Martha Beck in 1977, with the mandate of seeking to "express the quality and diversity of drawing -- unique works on paper -- as a major art form". It was originally housed in $900-a-month ground-floor space in a warehouse at 137 Greene Street in SoHo before it moved to its present location, on the ground floor of a 19th-century cast-iron-fronted building at 35 Wooster Street, in the late 1980s. In its first year, the Drawing Center attracted 125,000 visitors.

After a $10 million renovation in 2012, designed by Claire Weisz of WXY Architecture & Urban Design, the museum today occupies two and a half floors, 50 percent more exhibition space.

== Activities ==
Each year, the center presents "Selections" exhibitions featuring the work of emerging artists as well as exhibitions of historical and contemporary drawing-based work. In conjunction with its interior expansion in 2012, the Drawing Center announced the start of a long-term initiative to exhibit Latin American drawing. The Drawing Room, located across the street from the Main Gallery, features dynamic, drawing-based installations and exhibitions by emerging and under-recognized artists. The center offers a range of public programs for both adults and children, including film screenings, literary readings, artist talks, symposia, performances, and The Big Draw, a day-long event or series of events featuring artist-led drawing activities for all ages.

== List of shows ==
=== Before 2010 ===
- Leon Golub: Live & Die Like a Lion?
- Selections Spring 2010: Sea Marks
- Sun Xun: Shock of Time
- Apparently Invisible: Selections Spring 2009
- Matt Mullican: A Drawing Translates the Way of Thinking
- M/M (Paris): Just Like an Ant Walking on the Edge of the Visible
- Greta Magnusson Grossman: Furniture and Lighting
- Rirkrit Tiravanija: Demonstration Drawings
- Kathleen Henderson: What If I Could Draw a Bird That Could Change the World?
- Drawing on Film
- Frederick Kiesler: Co-Realities
- Yüksel Arslan: Visual Interpretations
- Drawing Out: Student Artwork from Drawing Connections
- Selections Spring 2008
- Sterling Ruby: CHRON
- Alan Saret Gang Drawings, 2007

=== 2010 ===
- "Day Job" group show
- Gerhard Richter, Lines which do not exist
- Claudia Wieserm, Poems of the Right Angle
- Dorothea Tanning: Early Designs for the Stage
- Eva Hesse Drawing
- Leon Golub: Live & Die Like a Lion?
- Drawing Out: Student Artwork from the Drawing Connections Program
- Iannis Xenakis: Composer, Architect, Visionary
- Ree Morton: At the Still Point of the Turning World
- Unica Zürn: Dark Spring

=== 2011 ===
- Pathways Drawing In, On, and Through the Landscapegroup show:artists: Ann Carlson i Mary Ellen Strom, Mark Harris, Jessica Mein, Terry Nauheim, Candida Richardson, Gosia Wlodarczak
- Drawing and its Double, Selections from the Istituto Nazionale per la Grafica, group show:artists: Giorgio Ghisi, Lafrery Du Perac, Salvator Rosa, Giovanni Battista Piranesi, Antonio Canova, Giorgio Morandi, Piero Dorazio, Achille Perilli
- Paolo Canevari, Decalogo
- Drawn from Photography group show:artists: L Alvarez, Andrea Bowers, Fernando Bryce, Sam Durant, Ewan Gibbs, Karl Haendel, Richard Forster, Serkan Ozkaya, Emily Prince, Frank Selby, Paul Sietsema, Mary Temple, Christian Tomaszewski (C.T. Jasper)

=== 2012 ===
- Guillermo Kuitca, Diarios
- José Antonio Suárez Londoño The Yearbooks
- Sean Scully, Change and Horizontals

=== 2013 ===
- Drawing Time, Reading Time- group show: artists: Carl Andre, Pavel Büchler, Guy de Cointet, Mirtha Dermisache, Sean Landers, Allen Ruppersberg, Nina Papaconstantinou, Deb Sokolow, Molly Springfield.
- William Engelen, Falten
- Susan Hefuna and Luca Veggetti, NOTATIONOTATIONS
- Terry Smith, Document
- Giosetta Fioroni L’Argento
- Alexandre Singh, The Pledge
- Ignacio Uriarte, Line of Work
- Ishmael Randall, Weeks, Cuts, Burns, Punctures

=== 2014 ===
- Sari Dienes, Sari Dienes
- Xanti Schawinsky, Head Drawings and Faces of War
- Thread Lines group show
- Small, group show: artists: Firelei Báez, Emmanouil Bitsakis, Paul Chiappe, Claire Harvey, Tom Molloy, Rita Ponce de León, Peggy Preheim, James Sheehan and Tinus Vermeersch
- Lebbeus Woods, Architect
- Len Lye, Motion Sketch
- Open Sessions, group show: artists: Eleanor Aldrich, Derek Dunlop, Heather Hart, Yara Pina, Andrew Ross, Lauren Seiden, Barbara Weissberger.
- Andrea Bowers i Suzanne LacyDrawing Lessons
- Rashaad Newsome, FIVE
- Deborah Grant, Christ You Know it Ain't Easy!!
- Dickinson/Walser Pencil Sketches

== Management and funding ==
The Drawing Center named Laura Hoptman, a former curator at The Museum of Modern Art, Executive Director in 2018.

In August 2005, the Drawing Center was considered one of the groups to occupy the World Trade Center. The plan was scrapped, and then the center's leadership spent a couple of years exploring a move to the South Street Seaport, where it planned to build a $60 million museum. By 2010 the museum decided to stay put and expand its Wooster Street home.

Also in 2005, it was among 406 New York City arts and social service institutions to receive part of a $20 million grant from the Carnegie Corporation, which was made possible through a donation by New York City mayor Michael Bloomberg. For the 2012 renovation, the Lower Manhattan Development Corporation gave a $3 million grant, one of its largest contributions toward a single construction project.

As of 2011, attendance was at 35,000 visitors a year. As of 2018, the center attracted 55,000 visitors a year.
