= Hamad Butt =

British-Pakistani artist

- Born: January 9, 1962; Lahore, Pakistan
- Died: September 25, 1994 (aged 32); London, U.K.
- Cause of death: Complications from AIDS
- Education: Goldsmiths, University of London; Central Saint Martins
- Notable work: Transmission (1990); Familiars (1992)
- Style: sculpture, installation, drawing, contemporary art

Hamad Masood Butt (9 January 1962 – 25 September 1994) was a British artist of Pakistani heritage who made a series of pioneering works in the early 1990s which sought to bring art into conversation with science, specifically in critical response to the AIDS crisis.

== Early life and education ==
Butt was born in Lahore, Pakistan in 1962 and moved with his family to East London in 1964. He was the second of five siblings. He was raised in the Muslim faith. As a child he lived in Manor Park and Ilford.

He undertook a series of courses in art from 1981 until 1987, including a foundation year at Goldsmiths, University of London and short courses in printmaking and other media at Morley College and Central Saint Martins. He enrolled on the BA Fine Art degree programme at Goldsmiths, University of London from 1987 to 1990.

There he was part of a lively cohort of art students including Damien Hirst, Angela Bulloch, Mat Collishaw, Angus Fairhurst, Michael Landy, Gillian Wearing and Simon Patterson, many of whom would become known as the Young British Artists (Butt was not affiliated).

== Career ==
Butt graduated from Goldsmiths, University of London in 1990. He presented his first major installation, Transmission as his degree show in June 1990. The installation included a circle of glass books (now part of the Tate Collection), a series of works on paper, an animated video, and a vitrine containing live flies. The latter anticipated a similar work, A Thousand Years (1990) by Damien Hirst, a fellow student at Goldsmiths, University of London, who showed the work as part of a group exhibition later in 1990. Transmission was subsequently shown in an amended form as part of an exhibition at the short-lived Milch Gallery, run by his friend Lawren Maben.

In 1992 Butt showed Familiars, a tripartite installation of dangerous-looking sculptures constructed of glass and steel in precarious setups that appear to threaten to release toxic matter into the immediate environment. They featured the elemental materials bromine (as a liquid), chlorine (as a gas), and iodine (as solid crystals). Substance Sublimation Units is a kinetic sculpture that uses a heating element to sublimate the crystals into a violet gas inside a series of glass chambers organised into the shape of a ladder. Cradle consists of up to 18 glass spheres containing yellow chlorine gas suspended in a form resembling a Newton's cradle, a device designed to demonstrate the principles of conservation of momentum and conservation of energy in physics, and popular in the 1980s as an executive toy.

Familiars was first shown in 1992 at the John Hansard Gallery in Southampton. Its director the curator Stephen Foster commissioned the work, which enabled Butt to undertake the complex fabrication of the works in collaboration with chemists and technical glassblowers at Imperial College London. Familiars is described by critics as invoking existential themes in its provocation of fear, anxiety or dread. Art critic Stuart Morgan wrote in a review in Frieze that, on encountering Butt's Substance Sublimation Unit (1992), "Watching iodine crystals inside the rungs of a hollow glass ladder heat and turn into vapour stresses the themes of metamorphosis, disguise or sheer instability, and visitors become more and more uneasy as they sense comparisons between their own existence and that of these volatile substances." However, British art historian Daniel Fountain argued that "these works cease to be pureply apocalyptic. At any rate, there are just as many references to toys, ladders, and hungry plants as there are to decay, death, and destruction".

Throughout his work of the 1990s, Butt devised encounters between art and science. He was interested in science fiction, as evidenced in his regular usage of the figure of the triffid, as sourced from the cover of the 1963 Penguin paperback edition of John Wyndham's novel The Day of the Triffids: it was etched into the glass books in his first major work Transmission as well and animated in the accompanying video piece.

Butt also made many paintings, drawings and works on paper.

Familiars was posthumously included in the exhibition Rites of Passage: Art at the End of the Century (curated by Stuart Morgan and Frances Morris) at Tate Gallery (now Tate Britain) in 1995 alongside works by Louise Bourgeois, Robert Gober, Mona Hatoum, Susan Hiller, Bill Viola and others. His work has also been included in group exhibitions at Whitechapel Gallery, Institute of Contemporary Arts, London, and again at Tate Britain, the latter as part of its exhibition of the Tate permanent collection in 2023–24.

The first museum retrospective of his work, Hamad Butt: Apprehensions, curated by Dominic Johnson, took place at the Irish Museum of Modern Art (IMMA), Dublin (December 2024 to May 2025) and tours to the Whitechapel Gallery, London (June to September 2025).

== Death ==
Butt died of AIDS-related pneumonia in St Mary's Hospital, London.
