= Fergal Stapleton =

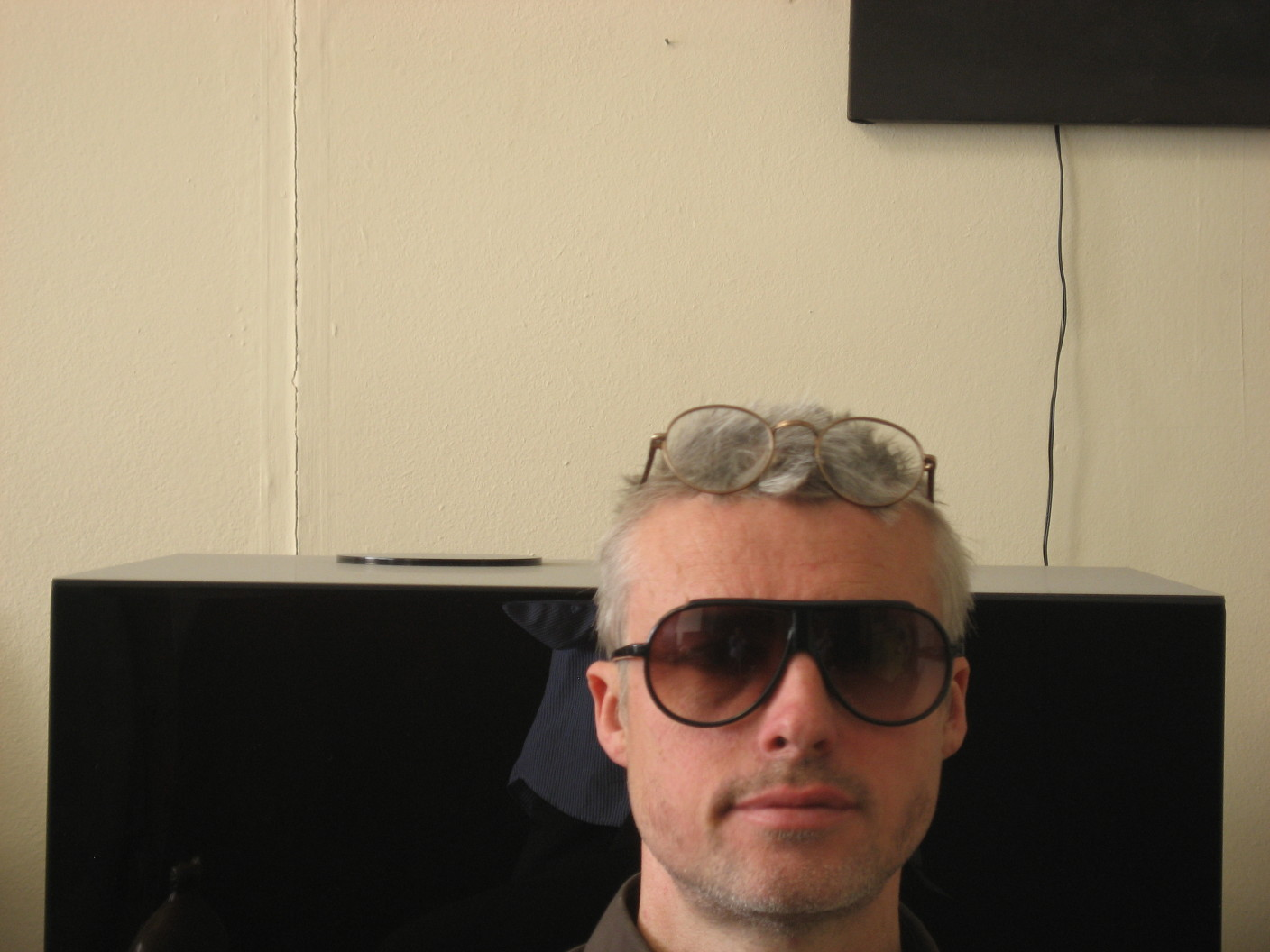
Fergal Stapleton in 2011

Fergal Stapleton (born 1961 in Ireland) is an artist living and working in London.

Between 1994 and 1997, he collaborated on a number of works with Turner Prize nominee Rebecca Warren. He is represented by Carl Freedman Gallery.

Stuart Morgan (art critic) on Stapleton's 1993 show "His manner of entertaining us…the worst thing I have ever done." (frieze (magazine), No. 10, May 1993): 'The logic of dandyism as a mode of conceptual art assumes a view of the dandy not as engaged in a foppish, decadent pursuit but as an attempt to get over class distinction by creating one's own aristocracy, as well as doing what aristocrats do but doing it better, and securing the knowledge that their order and the natural superiority it implies is on a false premise.’

Stapleton is additionally the author of a novel titled After the Death of the Goat God (Key Principles in History 2) ISBN 978-0956441928

== Solo exhibitions (selected) ==
- Lo Ceremonial (Carl Freedman Gallery, 2016)
- 2moro (Carl Freedman Gallery, 2014)
- dOr (Carl Freedman Gallery, 2010)
- If one good deed in all my life I did, I do repent it from my very soul (V22, London 2009)
- Art Show (in V22 Presents:The Wharf Rd Project 2008)
- And a Door Opened (Carl Freedman Gallery, 2007)
- Stapleton Grey (Carl Freedman Gallery, London, 2006)
- I Shall Arrive Soon (Carl Freedman Gallery, London, 2003)

== Collaborations (selected) ==
- The Unadorned Hardcore World of the Anabolic Mutant in Stir (with Rebecca Warren, The Showroom, London 1997)

== Group exhibitions (selected) ==
- Take a little walk to the edge of town and cross the tracks (Coombs Contemporary at Watson, Farley, Williams, London 2018)
- A Darkness More Than Night (QUAD Gallery, Derby 2012)
- The Shape We're In (Zabludowicz Collection, 176 Prince of Wales Rd, London 2011)
- Newspeak: British Art Now (Saatchi Gallery, Duke of York's HQ, London 2010))
- Newspeak: British Art Now (The State Hermitage Museum, St Petersburg 2009)

== Curations ==
- The Real, (in V22 Presents:The Sculpture Show, The Biscuit Factory, London, 2009)
