= Sandra Cinto =

Brazilian contemporary artist

- Born: 1968 (age 57–58)
- Education: Faculdades Integradas Teresa D’Ávila
- Known for: Pen Drawings, Installations
- Style: Contemporary

Sandra Cinto is a Brazilian contemporary artist, known for her sculpture, drawing, paintings, and installations. Born in Santo Andre, Brazil in 1968; Cinto is currently living and working in São Paulo, Brazil. Cinto's artwork mixes installations, paintings, and detailed pen drawings. Sandra Cinto continues to produce artwork and showcase her work.

== Background and education ==
Cinto was born in 1968 in Santo André, Brazil. She graduated with a degree in art education, from Faculdades Integradas Teresa D’Ávila (FATEA), Santo André, Brazil, in 1990.

== Work ==
Cinto's media includes pen and acrylic on canvas, wood, and walls. As well as sculptures, made with various materials. Her work has been shown in many exhibitions such as Sandra Cinto: Chance and Necessity, USF Contemporary Art Museum, Tampa, Florida, USA 2016, Sandra Cinto, House Triangle, São Paulo, Brazil 1997, and others.

== Assorted exhibitions ==
- 2016-Sandra Cinto: Chance and Necessity, curated by Noel Smith, West Gallery, USF Contemporary Art Museum, Tampa, Florida, USA
- 2014- Fundación Luis Seoane, A Corunha, Spain
- 2013- Pausa., Casa Triângulo, São Paulo, Brazil, Piece of Silence, Tanya Bonakdar Gallery, New York, USA,
- 2010- Imitação da Água, curated by Jacopo Crivelli Visconti, Instituto Tomie Ohtake, São Paulo, Brazil
- 2006- Construção, Casa Triângulo, São Paulo, Brazil
- 2005- Sandra Cinto, Centre de Création Bazouges la Perouse, France
- 1998- Sandra Cinto, Casa Triângulo, São Paulo, Brazil
