= 2006 Turner Prize =

British prize for contemporary art

There were four nominees for the 2006 Turner Prize for British contemporary art, and the winner was Tomma Abts.

The nominees in alphabetical order were:

- Tomma Abts – nominated for her solo exhibitions at Kunsthalle Basel, Switzerland, and greengrassi, London.
- Phil Collins – nominated for solo exhibitions at Milton Keynes Gallery, Tanya Bonakdar Gallery, New York City, and his presentation in British Art Show 6
- Mark Titchner – nominated for his solo exhibition at Arnolfini, Bristol.
- Rebecca Warren – nominated for her solo exhibitions at Matthew Marks Gallery, New York City, and Galerie Daniel Buchholz, Cologne, and for her contribution to the Tate Triennial 2006.

== Turner Prize exhibition 2006 ==
The Turner Prize is awarded for a show by the artist in the previous year. When nominees are told of their nomination they then prepare exhibits for the Turner Prize exhibition, often at short notice. As such, the Turner Prize exhibition may not feature the works for which the artist was initially nominated by the judges. However the Turner Prize exhibition tends to be the basis on which public and press judge the artist's worthiness for nomination.

=== Nominated artists' works and press coverage ===
==== Tomma Abts (winner) ====
Tomma Abts exhibited works were eleven abstract paintings (acrylic and oil on canvas). The works titles are all taken from a book of German Christian names and included:

- Ebe
  - Abstract painting in blues and white of triangular and circular shapes.
- Lübbe
  - Abstract painting in brown and pastel tones.
- Epko
  - Abstract painting in light and dark browns.
- Ert
  - Abstract painting in curved lines of blue-grey tones.
- Mehm
  - Abstract painting with angular lines in red hues (see Guardian audio slideshow).
- Veeke
  - Abstract painting with angular lines of various hues on grey background (see Guardian audio slideshow).

Artist's statement:

"I can't really ever say what it will look like or how it will finish or what will make it work. It's a different idea or moment for each painting. It's not really... I try so much with the composition and colour, and get closer and closer, and then there's always a moment where there's a surprise, when I try something and ... everything is in place."

Gallery text:

- "She works consistently to a format of 48 x 38 centimetres in acrylic and oil paint. She uses no source material and begins with no preconceived idea of the final result. Instead, her paintings take shape through a gradual process of layering and accrual. As the internal logic of each composition unfolds forms are defined, buried and rediscovered until the painting becomes 'congruent with itself'."

Press coverage:

- "At most, her well-ordered geometric forms look mildly 'trippy' but the trip doesn't lead anywhere." – The Guardian
- "I would vote for her" – The Independent
- "Seen in reproduction or from a distance, these low-keyed paintings look like nothing much at all. But step up close to any one of them, examine it with attention, and you will be knocked off your feet." – The Telegraph
- "I hope that Abts takes the Turner Prize this year [...] because her paintings have a lovely sense of inner congruence. They are impossible to reproduce or describe. They have to be seen. Her work, quite simply, works visually." – The Times

==== Phil Collins ====
Phil Collins' exhibited works were films and an installation consisting of a fully staffed and functioning production office.

- the return of the real / gercegin geri donusu
  - A film in which people who have been on reality television or talk shows speak about how the experience had a negative impact on their lives.
- Shady Lane Productions
  - An installation consisting of a staffed production office.
- baghdad screentests
- they shoot horses
  - A seven-hour video of Palestinians disco dancing.

Gallery text:

- "Phil Collins’s art investigates our ambivalent relationship with the camera as both an instrument of attraction and manipulation, of revelation and shame. He often operates within forms of low-budget television and reportage-style documentary to address the discrepancy between reality and its representations."
- "gives even that most potentially tedious of cultural productions, the art video, a bad name. His interminable films are even less riveting than the reality TV programmes that they set out to question."

Press coverage:

- "thought-provoking and charming" – The Guardian
- "[Shady Lane Productions] is, like Duchamp's urinal, art only because the artist says it is art." – The Independent

==== Mark Titchner ====
Mark Titchner's exhibited works were installations and pictures, including:

- How To Change Behaviour (Tiny Masters of the World Come Out)
  - Installation of multiple items, some looking like car batteries. A picture on the wall has "TINY MASTERS OF THE WORLD COME OUT" written on in large text. (see Guardian audio slideshow).
- The Memory of Our Will Will Was The Dirt From Your Feet
- If You Can Dream It, You Must Do It
  - Picture of an outstretched hand with the title written above
- Ergo Ergot
  - A tree like structure with motorised spirals

Gallery text:

- "Mark Titchner’s art explores the tensions between the different belief systems that inform society, be they religious, scientific or political. His sculptural installations are provocative hybrids that often combine new technologies with old techniques."

Press coverage:

- "Titchner, whose work incorporates quotes from Heidegger and Nietzsche, doesn't actually have anything much to say." – The Guardian
- "The work is oddly artless in the sense of lacking guile, being unsophisticated and unworldly, even unaffected. Yet the objects have charm." – The Independent
- "I have written before with enthusiasm about Mark Titchener [but] you need an instruction manual to figure out what he's banging on about in the ugly sculptures he is showing here."
- "left me wishing that the art work could at least have a visual point" – The Times

==== Rebecca Warren ====
Rebecca Warren's exhibited works were sculptures and installations, including:

- 2001, 2002, 2003, 2004 or 2005
- Loulou
  - A sculpture of clay and acrylic paint.
- Pony
  - A figurative sculpture.
- Bronzes
  - Bronze sculptures (see Guardian audio slideshow).
- Teacher (M.B)
- Teacher (W)
- Teacher (R)
  - Three sculptures of varying approximations of the female form with large buttocks or breasts (see Guardian audio slideshow).

Gallery text:

- "deas of self-expression, gender and the nature and purpose of sculptural form converge in Warren’s work. However, she adopts a deliberately precarious stance, reinforcing a slippage of meaning through her hybrid titles which incorporate references to films, songs and made-up words, which mirror the varied forms of her work."

Press coverage:

- "eloquently expresses the statements she borrows, from academic feminism [but her] works only reinforce her source materials' primacy and potency." – The Guardian
- "she creates works of art that feel fresh and intimate" – The Telegraph
- "It doesn’t make a pretty sight. And its feminist message is tired." – The Times
- "while most of us would put that stuff in a bin, Warren insists it has a place in an art gallery" – Daily Mirror

==== Press judgment of exhibition as a whole ====
- "the exhibition overall is too safe and cerebral to generate controversy or really stimulate viewers. Perhaps this year's judges were simply tired of fighting." – The Guardian
- "I left the show after the second of my two visits thinking that this is not a vintage year for the Turner prize." – The Independent
- "a consistently fascinating exhibition" – The Telegraph
- "[The Prize] seems to have nowhere to turn except inwards – if the Turner, in part, represents the state of the contemporary, this year’s contribution reflects what a drab mess that is." – The Times
