= Molly Springfield =

American artist (born 1977)

- Born: 1977 (age 48–49)
- Education: University of California, Berkeley
- Known for: Drawing
- Website: mollyspringfield.com

Molly Springfield (born 1977) is an American artist whose work includes labor-intensive drawings of printed texts and visual explorations of the history of information and mediated representation.

== Life ==
She received her M.F.A. from the University of California, Berkeley, was a participant at Skowhegan and a MacDowell Fellow, and is a 2025 Guggenheim Fellow. Her work is included in the permanent collections of the Whitney Museum of American Art, the Metropolitan Museum of Art, and the National Museum of Women in the Arts.

Springfield's art practice combines meticulous, observational drawing with conceptual and historical investigations. Her drawings and installations are typically based on texts that reveal visionary moments in the history of how people experience, organize, and reproduce information. She is best known for delicate, faithful graphite-on-paper drawings of photocopied books.

Springfield's "Marginalia Archive" is an interactive installation that explores the relationships readers have with text. Her source material, contemporary examples of marginalia submitted by friends and viewers, is repurposed into a functioning archive that expands during the course of an exhibition. According to one art critic, the project "extends her practice of drawing printed and handwritten text, and adds a social dimension" that "chimes with today's social media consciousness and with growing concern over what, in the way of participatory engagement, we will lose if the age of the book actually does come to an end."

Springfield has completed what she called a "translation" of the first chapter of Marcel Proust's In Search of Lost Time, consisting entirely of drawings of photocopies of every existing English translation of the novel. Critic Kenneth Baker, writing in the San Francisco Chronicle, called it an "irresistible" work "of rare conceptual elegance". In 2009, the project was exhibited at Steven Wolf Fine Arts in San Francisco, where it was nominated for an AICA (International Association of Art Critics) Award for "Best Show in a Commercial Gallery Nationally"; at Thomas Robertello Gallery in Chicago, where it was listed as one of the top 5 drawing shows of the year by Newcity Magazine; and the Baltimore Museum of Art, where it was nominated for the Janet and Walter Sondheim Prize. In 2013, the project was included in the survey exhibition "Graphite" at the Indianapolis Museum of Art.

Springfield's previous work includes a major series of graphite drawings of photocopies of books concerning seminal moments in the history of conceptual art of the late 1960s and early 1970s—a series that was exhibited at The Drawing Center in New York in 2013–2014. In a November 2013 review of the project in The New York Times, critic Ken Johnson wrote: "What is an object, anyway? Must it be something material? Can a concept be an object? Are words and poems objects? What about sounds, actions and events? If an object exists only in a photograph, is it still an object? Do imaginary objects count? If you allow that a question can be an object, then such queries could be the primary objects of Ms. Springfield's beautifully realized, brain-teasing drawings."

Another previous installation by Springfield, exhibited in 2006, was based on the life and writings of William Henry Fox Talbot, the polymath who invented negative-positive photography. The installation is a mix of conceptual drawing, experimental photography, and historical homage—included graphite drawings of photocopied pages from the introduction to The Pencil of Nature.

== Collections ==
Springfield's work is in several public and private collections, including the Whitney Museum of American Art, the Metropolitan Museum of Art in New York, the National Museum of Women in the Arts, and the Sally & Wynn Kramarsky Collection. Her work has been included in exhibitions at the American University Museum, Baltimore Museum of Art, Berkeley Art Museum and Pacific Film Archive, Carpenter Center for the Visual Arts at Harvard University, the Honolulu Museum of Art Spalding House, Indianapolis Museum of Art, Portland Museum of Art, University of Richmond Museums, and the Zimmerli Art Museum at Rutgers University, and one-person exhibitions at galleries in New York, San Francisco, Chicago, Washington, DC, and Cologne, Germany.

Reviews of her work have appeared in Artforum, Art Papers, Modern Painters, The Village Voice, The New Yorker, the San Francisco Chronicle, and the Chicago Tribune. Springfield received her MFA from the University of California, Berkeley and was a participant at the Skowhegan School of Painting and Sculpture in 2006.

She has taught art at various institutions, including Berkeley, the Maryland Institute College of Art, American University, and George Washington University.
