= Liza Sylvestre =

American visual artist (born 1983)

- Born: 1983 (age 42–43); Minneapolis, Minnesota, U.S.
- Education: 2019 MFA Candidate - University of Illinois Urbana Champaign 2006 B.A. Fine Art - University of Minnesota
- Known for: Mixed Media, Installation, and Video Art
- Awards: 2014 Minnesota State Arts Board Artist Initiative Grant and Minnesota State Arts Board Arts Learning Grant

Liza Sylvestre (born November 13, 1983) is an American visual artist born and raised in Minneapolis, Minnesota. She is known for detailed abstract mixed media paintings and drawings. Her current work explores new media such as installation and video art. Much of her work revolves around our sensory perceptions and misconceptions of the world around.

== Personal life ==
While growing up in Minneapolis she began to lose her hearing around the age of six. She had a very gradual decline in her hearing ability that became more debilitating around the age of sixteen. She had a cochlear implant surgically placed in her ear to improve her hearing in 2003 when she was 20 years old. After graduating with her Bachelor of Arts in 2006 she moved to Miami for 6 years to work and exhibit her artwork.

She currently lives in Illinois with her husband, artist and writer Christopher Jones, and her two children.

== Exhibitions ==
Solo exhibitions

2019

- Third Space. New Genres Art Space, Rockford, IL
- Third Space. The Plains Art Museum, Fargo, ND

2018

- Captioned. Granary Arts, Ephraim, UT

2017

- Interference. Soo Visual Arts Center, Minneapolis, MN

2015

- Meridians. Public Functionary, Minneapolis, MN

2014

- Elements Unheard. MacRostie Art Center, Grand Rapids, MN

Group exhibitions

2020

- Flashlight Project for Heavy Breathing. Land & Sea Gallery, Oakland, CA
- Voices in the Gallery. John Hansard Gallery, Southampton, England

2019

- The Other Four. The Plains Art Museum, Fargo, ND
- MFA Thesis Show. Krannert Art Museum, Champaign, IL

2018

- A Place for Us. Hairpin Arts Center, Chicago IL
- Humanly Possible: The Empathy Exhibition. Frederick Layton Gallery of Milwaukee Institute of Art & Design, Milwaukee, WI

2017

- Twentieth International Opening Exhibition, Woman Made Gallery, Chicago, IL
- Between the Sky & the Earth. Roots & Culture Contemporary Art Center, Chicago, IL

2016

- Michael Dandley / Liza Sylvestre. Nahcotta, Portsmouth, NH
- Art(ists) on the Verge 7 Fellowship Exhibition. Soap Factory, Minneapolis, MN

2015

- Enormous Tiny Art Show 18. Nahcotta, Portsmouth, NH

2014

- Enormous Tiny Art Show 16. Nahcotta, Portsmouth, NH
- Ned Evans / Carly Glovinski / Liza Sylvestre. Nahcotta, Portsmouth, NH
- Get Lucky. Soo Visual Arts Center, Minneapolis, MN

2013

- Enormous Tiny Art Show 14. Nahcotta, Portsmouth, NH

2012

- Natural Curiosities. Miami International Airport, Miami, FL
- This and That. Art Center of South Florida, Miami, FL

2011

- Recently Acquired. Audrey Love Gallery, Miami, FL

2010

- Small Works. The Swenson Gallery, Miami FL
- Lucky You. Audrey Love Gallery, Miami FL

Screenings and events

2019

- The Film and Video Poetry Symposium at Cinema Kosmos, Moscow, Russia

2018

- Captioned. Lease Agreement, Huntsville, TX
- Symposium on Sensory Loss and Art. Weisman Art Museum, Minneapolis MN
- The Film & Video Poetry Society. Los Angeles, CA
- The Feminist Film Festival. Champaign, IL

2017

- Northwest Conference of the Society for Photographic Education. Portland, OR

== Commissions ==
- 25 piece commission for the 4 star James Hotel, Miami Beach FL

== Awards ==
2021

- Awarded Joan Mitchell Fellowship from the Joan Mitchell Foundation

2017

- Art Works Grant, National Endowment for the Arts (in conjunction with SooVAC)
- Travel Grant, University of Illinois at Urbana Champaign
- Mary Jane Neer Scholarship, University of Illinois at Urbana Champaign

2016

- University Fellowship, University of Illinois at Urbana Champaign

2015

- Art(ists) on the Verge 7 Fellow (Jerome Foundation)
- VSA Jerome - Emerging Artist Grantee
- Metropolitan Regional Arts Council - Arts Learning Grantee

2014

- Minnesota State Arts Board - Artist Initiative Grant
- Minnesota State Arts Board - Arts Learning Grant

== See also ==
- List of American artists
