= C.T. Jasper =

Polish-American contemporary artist (born 1971)

- Born: Christian Tomaszewski; 1971 (age 54–55); Gdańsk, Poland
- Education: Academy of Fine Arts, Poznań
- Known for: Installation, film, video, sculpture, sound
- Awards: Guggenheim Fellowship; Pollock-Krasner Foundation; Gottlieb Foundation; Polish Film Institute

C.T. Jasper + Joanna Malinowska, Halka/Haiti 18°48’05”N 72°23’01”W, Multichannel video projection with sound; 82 minutes, dimensions variable, 2015. Polish Pavilion, the 56th Venice Biennale.

C.T. Jasper (born Christian Tomaszewski, 1971) is a Polish-born multimedia artist and educator based on the East Coast of the US and in Gdynia, Poland. His artwork includes installation, video, film, sound, sculpture and printed matter. Jasper gained recognition in the 2000s (under his birth name) for projects in which he altered or recreated fragments of existing iconic films in order to scrutinize visual and aural cinematic language. Critic Lilly Wei characterized these interventions as "laced with sociopolitical issues, as viewed through a skeptical but romantic lens." Since 2015, he has collaborated with artist Joanna Malinowska (under the name C.T. Jasper), including a project that represented Poland at the 56th Venice Biennale. Their work often brings together diverse social, ethnic and artistic phenomena in explorations of cultural transmission and exchange, national and personal identity, migration and assimilation.

Jasper has received a Guggenheim Fellowship and grants from the Pollock-Krasner Foundation and Gottlieb Foundation, among others. He has exhibited at venues including the Centre Pompidou-Metz, Hirshhorn Museum, Drawing Center, Irish Museum of Modern Art, SculptureCenter and Zachęta – National Gallery of Art (Warsaw). He is an assistant professor in sculpture at the Tyler School of Art and Architecture at Temple University.

== Education and career ==
Jasper was born in Gdańsk, Poland in 1971. He initially studied painting at the Academy of Fine Arts, Poznań in Poland, earning an MFA in 1996. Shortly after graduating, he moved to New York City and worked for several years as a studio assistant and manager to conceptual artists Ilya and Emilia Kabakov; their notion of "total" installation is an influence on his work. Jasper began teaching in 2007 at Princeton University; in 2009 he co-taught a course at the Princeton Atelier with Toni Morrison. He has been at the Tyler School of Art and Architecture since 2010.

Jasper has had solo or two-person institutional exhibitions at Kunstsammlungen Chemnitz (2006), SculptureCenter (2007), Performa '09, Muzeum Sztuki (Łódź, 2015), and the 56th Venice Biennale (2015), among others.

== Work and reception ==
Jasper's earlier work investigated the role of cinematic, science fiction and utopian discourses in shaping collective imagination and perception. Curator James Voorhies wrote of these projects: "the political in Jasper's work is actually achieved by creating a new sensory experience in the museum. This reframing takes place when we are confused about how easily to interpret a thing, situation or experience. [His works] all instigate on various levels a productive kind of strangeness and confusion."

Jasper's collaborations with Joanna Malinowska take a more anthropological perspective, examining cultural exchange and appropriation, collective mythologies and historical narratives, and national identity. Their sculptural, performance, sound and video projects often bring disparate elements from social history, art, music and everyday life into situational encounters.

=== Solo work ===
Jasper's early projects examined the influence of cinema, media, science fiction and architecture through recontextualizations or reworkings of existing forms and motifs. Among diverse projects of this period were installations that reconfigured exhibition spaces at Exit Art (2003) and Artpace (2009); a series of tabloid-like illustrations depicting assassinated public figures such as Indira Gandhi, Martin Luther King and Grigori Rasputin ("Hunting for Pheasants," 2007–08); and Mother Earth Sister Moon (Performa '09, with Joanna Malinowska), an enormous inflated white spacesuit inspired by Soviet-bloc science-fiction films that was both a sculptural installation and performance space.

Christian Tomaszewski, On Chapels, Caves and Erotic Misery, 500 cardboard sheets 4' x 8', carpet, MDF, etched black mirrors, architectural models, fluorescent light; dimensions variable, 2005/2007. Sculpture Center, New York.

Between 2004 and 2007, Jasper produced On Chapels, Caves, and Erotic Misery, a series of installations made of cardboard in which he recreated fragments of spaces (both scale-modelled and life-sized), well-known props and views from the 1986 David Lynch film, Blue Velvet. The series' title referenced Kurt Schwitters's kaleidoscopic, layered Merzbau works, which influenced the aesthetics of some of the tableaux and overall presentation. Critics noted the installations' superimposition of different forms of representation (film, still image, text and object) onto one another and the play between fantasy and reality and memory and actuality—qualities accentuated by the fragile, ephemeral materials used. Murtaza Vali of Art Review observed, "Tomaszewski's project distinguishes itself through its postmodernist embrace of citation, its attempt to render a particular filmic phenomenology and narrative logic in real space, translating the chronological flow of sound and image into the multisensory simultaneity of an installation."

In subsequent installations, Jasper directly intervened in existing films, digitally excising all of the characters and voices from original footage through meticulous processes. Erased (2013) juxtaposed adjacent film projections of pivotal portions of Volker Schlöndorff's The Tin Drum (1979) and Blue Velvet, emptied of human life. The resulting scenes—austere and scored with displaced ambient sounds such as footfalls, breaking glass and creaking doors punctuated by bursts of dramatic music or incomprehensible shouts—were described as haunting in their stillness and sense of estrangement. Sunset of the Pharaohs (2014) was a large-scale, camera bellows-shaped sculpture made of 160 sheepskins that was likened to a "retro-futurist" nomadic dwelling. Inside, a film projected scenes of ancient Egypt—the entirety of the 1966 Jerzy Kawalerowicz Polish film Faraon (Pharaoh)—also with all human traces removed. Critics such as Krzysztof Kościuczuk of Frieze suggested these interventions also erased the ability to interpret plot, thus shifting attention to scenery, score, props and cinematic techniques: "Peeling off the visual layers of landmark works of American and European cinema, [Jasper] doesn't so much dissect the structure of a film itself, as the whole cinematic experience—laying bare the way in which we make sense of what we see and hear."

With the projects PLAYTIME (2009) and In the Dust of the Stars, Jasper examined visions of the future inspired by science-fiction movies and 20th-century visual culture that ultimately seemed anachronistic through contemporary eyes. For the PLAYTIME installation, he excised, montaged and fused the minimal modernist designs, bright colors and sounds of Jacques Tati's iconic films into a singular physical environment, conflating filmic and exhibition spaces.

=== Collaborations with Joanna Malinowska ===
Jasper began collaborating regularly with Joanna Malinowska in 2015, including a two-person retrospective, "Relations Disrelations" (2015, Muzeum Sztuki), which explored relationships, connections and contrasts between their individual work.

C.T. Jasper + Joanna Malinowska, Who is Afraid of Natasha?, Replica of the "Natasha" sculpture; video, 23 minutes, sound, 2021. Bruges Triennial 2021: TraumA, Belgium.

Their Venice Biennale project, Halka/Haiti: 18° 48'05" N 72° 23'01" W (2015/2018), was inspired by a little-known historical connection between Haiti and Poland and the 1982 Werner Herzog film Fitzcarraldo, about a mad visionary obsessed with bringing live opera to the Amazon. The history involved a group of Haitian people, the Poloné, who descended from early 19th-century Polish soldiers that were sent to put down the island's slave rebellion, but instead defected. For the project, the artists filmed their outdoor staging of a canonical Polish national opera, Stanisław Moniuszko's Halka, in the village of Casale, Haiti, the population center of the Poloné. The cast and crew were a mix of Poles and Haitians, including soloists from the Poznan Opera House, musicians from a Port-au-Prince orchestra and dancers from Cazale. The exhibited work—shot in an immersive manner with four cameras capturing both on- and off-stage action—was presented in a panoramic form related to the painted dioramas of natural history museums.

Like Halka/Haiti, the allegorical film and public installation Who is Afraid of Natasha? (2021, Triennial Brugge) re-staged a cultural fragment from one context to another. The artists reimagined a well-known monument nicknamed "Natasha"—a modest, bronze Socialist Realist-style figure that stood in a prominent public square in Gdynia, Poland from 1953 to 1990—and re-sited it to Bruges, with the addition of a red lightning bolt sprayed on the right side of the figure's dress, symbolizing support for recent large-scale women's protests in Poland. The project's film revealed a complex composite portrait whose different narratives included the statue's original purpose to celebrate the WWII Soviet-Polish alliance, its subsequent association with an oppressive communist regime, and potential new stories stemming from the reconstruction, new location and era.

In several projects Jasper and Malinowska took a more anthropological direction. Bureau of Masks Inventory documented the ubiquitous and odd presence of African masks and artifacts—regarded as highly coveted symbols of openness and status—in their hometown, Tricity, Poland, from the 1960s until the collapse of communism. The exhibition "In Savage Society" (2019) explored collective mythologies, historical truth and accepted narratives involving the collision of indigenous and Western cultures, with reference to the work of anthropologist Bronisław Malinowski. "The Domestic Plane" (2020) was a changing exhibition of disparate and fragmentary objects that examined the cultural influences and pressures affecting mundane choices about furnishing domestic spaces.

The artists have also produced sound works. The Emperor's Canary (2018, High Line, New York; Centre Pompidou-Metz examined environmental crisis, using two gramophones that played a swooshing recording of the Great Pacific Garbage Patch and the rasping breath of a person suffering from black lung disease, respectively; other versions of the work played the calls of nearly extinct bird species, howls of animals living near the Chernobyl nuclear plant, and saws felling trees in a protected forest. A morning in 1953 (Messiaen Reversed, Birds Released) (2022) was based on the 1953 Olivier Messiaen piano and orchestra composition, Réveil des oiseaux, which he transcribed from birdsong. In their project, the artists reversed the process, replacing the entire score's human-made sounds and instruments with the actual bird calls of the 38 species Messiaen used.

== Recognition ==
Jasper has received a Guggenheim Fellowship and grants from the Pollock-Krasner Foundation, Polish Cultural Institute, Gottlieb Foundation, Creative Capital, Ministry of Culture and National Heritage (Poland) and Polish Film Institute, among others. He was an artist-in-residence at Artpace, the Bronx Museum, International Studio & Curatorial Program, Irish Museum of Modern Art and Leube Baustoffe Foundation and a visiting artist at the American Academy in Rome.

Jasper's work belongs to the public art collections of the Central Museum of Textiles, Łódź, Ujazdowski Castle Centre for Contemporary Art, Centre Pompidou, Hirshhorn Museum, ING Polish Art Foundation, Kunstsammlungen Chemnitz, Museum Ludwig, Muzeum Sztuki, and Zachęta – National Gallery of Art, among others.
