= John Hansard Gallery =

Contemporary art gallery in Southampton, England

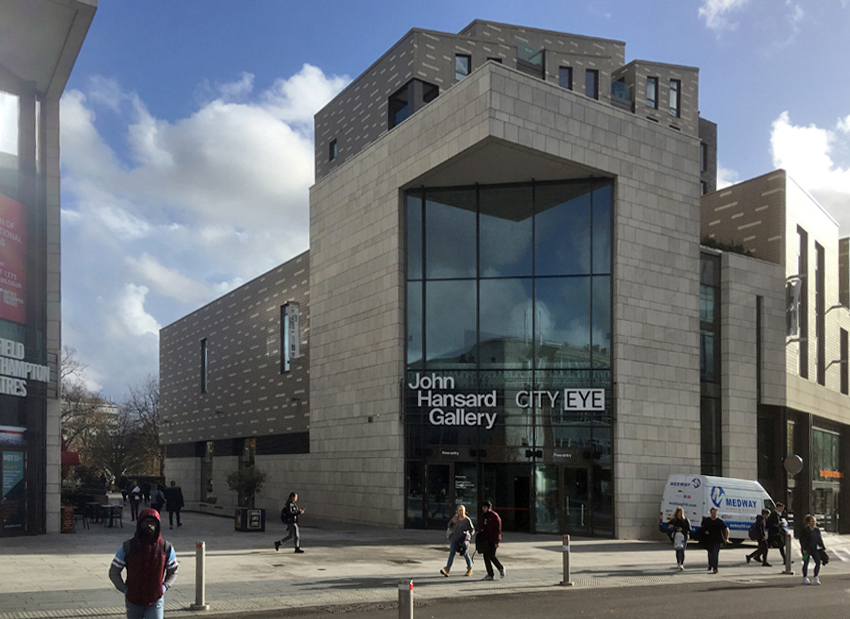
- New John Hansard Gallery

- Location in Southampton
- Address: 142-144 Above Bar St
- Location: Southampton
- Coordinates: 50°54′28″N 1°24′16″W
- Owner: University of Southampton
- Type: Art Gallery
- Event: Contemporary art

Construction
- Opened: 1979; 47 years ago
- Expanded: 2018

Website
- jhg.art

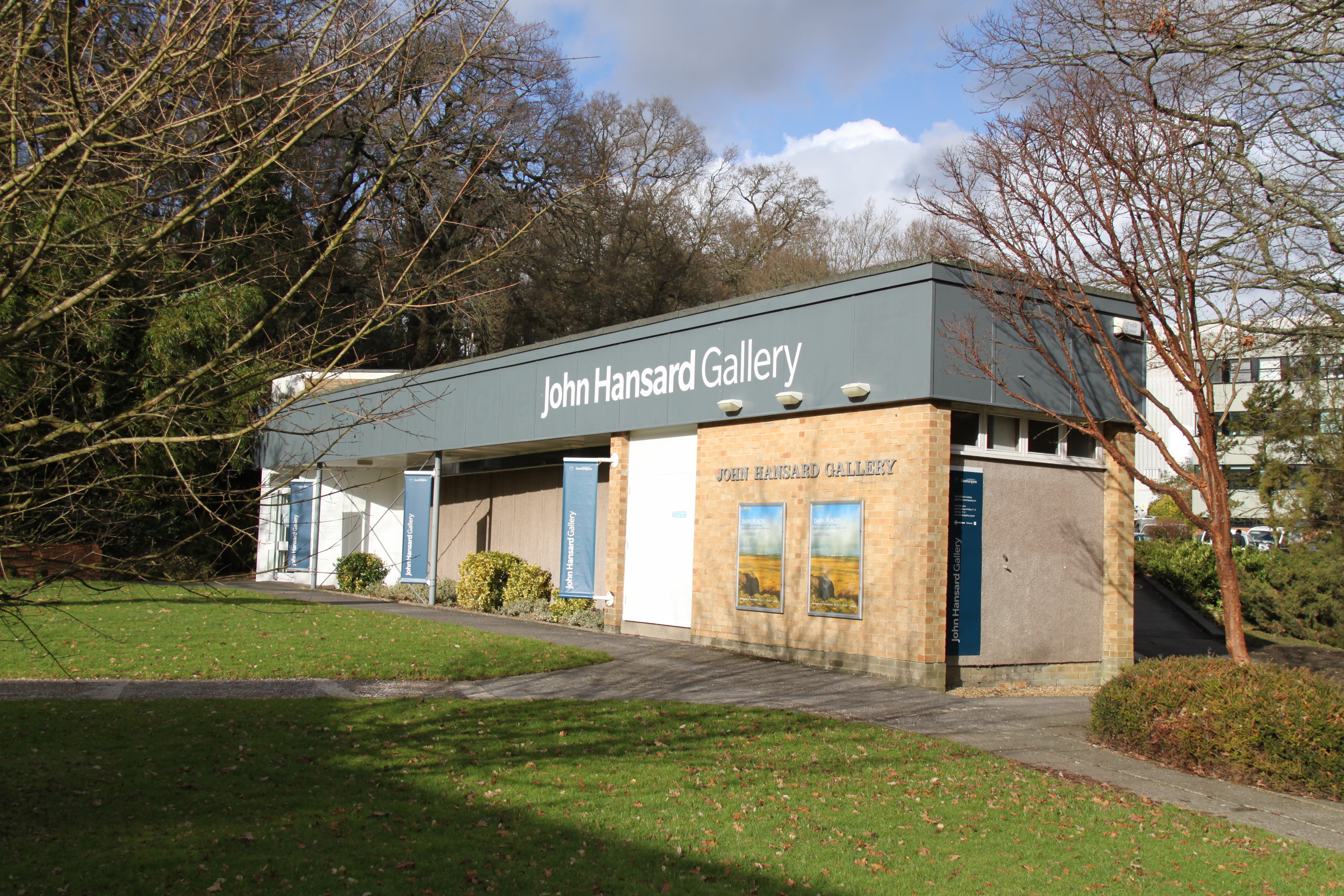
Original location

The John Hansard Gallery is a contemporary visual art gallery and part of the University of Southampton.

== History ==
The John Hansard Building was originally located in building 50 in the University of Southampton building coding scheme. It is named after benefactor John Hansard, a member of the family which originated the daily reports of proceedings in the Houses of Parliament. It was built in 1959 and was originally designed to house a tidal model of the Solent. The architect was Ronald Sims. The building was converted to gallery use in 1979–1980.

=== Relocation ===
In 2018, the gallery moved to a new location in the centre of Southampton, opposite Guildhall Square, as part of a new arts complex. The new gallery opened on 12 May. The new building was designed by CZWG, while the interior was designed by Glenn Howells.

== Exhibitions ==
Previous exhibitions have included Panacea, an artist's collaboration between Michael Pinsky and Walker & Bromwich; There Where You Are Not by Alec Finlay, Jeremy Millar, and Guy Moreton; Familiars by Hamad Butt; Lines in the Sand by Joan Jonas; 20 Million Mexicans Can't be Wrong with Francis Alÿs and Santiago Sierra; and Voices in the Gallery by Sarah Hayden, Christopher Robert Jones, and Liza Sylvestre.

From 11 February to 31 March 2012, the gallery hosted an art exhibition of new cutting-edge 3d technology by designer David Cotterrell. Cotterrell is an installation artist and launched this new exhibition entitled Monsters of the Id. using a new 3d technique of creating art work. This interprets his experiences through image manipulation, staging, CGI, 3D scanning, 3D printing and new projection techniques.

The opening exhibition in the new building consisted of works by Gerhard Richter, followed by Time after Time, curated by Stephen Foster, gallery director, with works by artists shown in Foster's previous exhibitions including John Latham, Caroline Bergvall, Charlotte Posenenske and Hamad Butt.

Exhibitions from 1979 - 2016 were made available online at A project aggregating and dispersing artwork collections and artwork titles from John Hansard Gallery UK

== Open data ==
- John Hansard Gallery - RDF Description from the University of Southampton
