= Tanya Bonakdar Gallery =

Art gallery in New York and California, US

Coordinates: 40°44′49.29″N 74°0′22.68″W

Tanya Bonakdar Gallery is an art gallery founded by Tanya Bonakdar and located in Chelsea, New York City. Since its inception in 1994, the gallery has exhibited new work by contemporary artists in all media, including painting, sculpture, installation, photography, and video.

== History ==
The gallery was originally located in the SoHo area, but moved to Chelsea in 1998 following other galleries' moves. and in 2006 underwent a major renovation that doubled the exhibition space, adding 5,000 square feet (460 m^{2}) of gallery space on the ground floor. In addition, Tanya Bonakdar Gallery regularly participates in major annual international art fairs such as Art Basel, Frieze Art Fair, Art Basel Miami Beach, The Armory Show (art fair) and Art Dealers Association of America Art Show.

From 2018 to 2025, Bonakdar also operated a space in Los Angeles, located at 1010 North Highland Avenue in Hollywood; during that time, is showed exhibitions of artists including Olafur Eliasson, Tomás Saraceno, Laura Lima and Susan Philipsz.

Tanya Bonakdar is a member of the Board of Directors of the Art Dealers Association of America (ADAA).

== Collections ==
The gallery represents over 30 artists, including:

- Uta Barth: ...from dawn to dusk (2022)
- Math Bass (since 2022)
- Monica Bonvicini (since 2022)
- Martin Boyce
- Sandra Cinto
- Phil Collins
- Mat Collishaw
- Mark Dion
- Nathalie Djurberg and Hans Berg
- Olafur Eliasson
- Meschac Gaba (since 2013)
- Shilpa Gupta
- Sabine Hornig
- Teresa Hubbard / Alexander Birchler
- Jónsi (since 2019)
- Kimsooja
- Carla Klein
- Laura Lima
- Liu Shiyuan
- Charles Long
- Rita Lundqvist
- Mark Manders
- Ernesto Neto
- Rivane Neuenschwander
- Karyn Olivier
- Lisa Oppenheim (since 2015)
- Susan Philipsz
- Amalia Pica
- Dana Powell
- Peggy Preheim
- Sherrill Roland
- Analia Saban
- Tomás Saraceno
- Thomas Scheibitz
- Slavs and Tatars
- Hannah Starkey
- Haim Steinbach
- Dirk Stewen
- Sarah Sze
- Jeffrey Vallance
- Gillian Wearing
- Nicole Wermers
- Lisa Williamson
- Wong Ping

In the past, the gallery has worked with the following artists and estates:

- Elmgreen & Dragset
- Agnieszka Kurant
- Jack Strange
