= Emily Prince =

American artist based in San Francisco (born 1981)

- Born: 1981 (age 44–45); Gold Run, California, USA
- Education: Stanford University, University of California, Berkeley
- Known for: drawing
- Notable work: American Servicemen and Women Who Have Died in Iraq and Afghanistan (But Not Including the Wounded, Nor the Iraqis nor the Afghans) (2004-present)

Emily Prince (born 1981) is an American artist based in San Francisco. Her art consists mainly of drawings which make up larger installations; these works are often site-specific and incorporate a documentation of time passing.

== Personal life and education ==
Prince was born in 1981 in Gold Run, California. She is married to artist Shaun O'Dell and has a son, Leon Lee Prince. She graduated from Stanford University in 2003, where she received the Raina Giese Award in Creative Painting. She completed her MFA in 2008 from University of California, Berkeley.

== Career ==
Prince was part of the 2007 Venice Biennale, showing a multitude of small portraits depicting soldiers killed in Afghanistan and Iraq. The piece, titled American Servicemen and Women Who Have Died in Iraq and Afghanistan (But Not Including the Wounded, Nor the Iraqis nor the Afghans), was purchased by the Saatchi Gallery and on exhibit in 2010. As of 2010, the piece had 5,213 portraits.

Previous projects include a series of drawings cataloguing all the items in her apartment, in definitive categories.

== Selected exhibitions ==
2009

- "The Way it Used to Be", Kent Fine Art, New York

2007

- 1998 A Short Show About Something, Red Mill Gallery, Vermont

2006

- Familiar, Eleanor Harwood Gallery, San Francisco
- Kapital, Kent Gallery, New York
- The Birthday Project, Jack Hanley Gallery, San Francisco

2005

- Bay Area Now 4, Yerba Buena Center for the Arts

2004

- The Bay Area Show, Art Institute of Detroit
- The San Francisco Show, New Image Art Gallery, Los Angeles
- Around around every day, Backroom Gallery, San Francisco
- See The Line Inside, Whitney Biennial (Cupcake Café), New York
