= Ian McKeever (artist) =

British artist

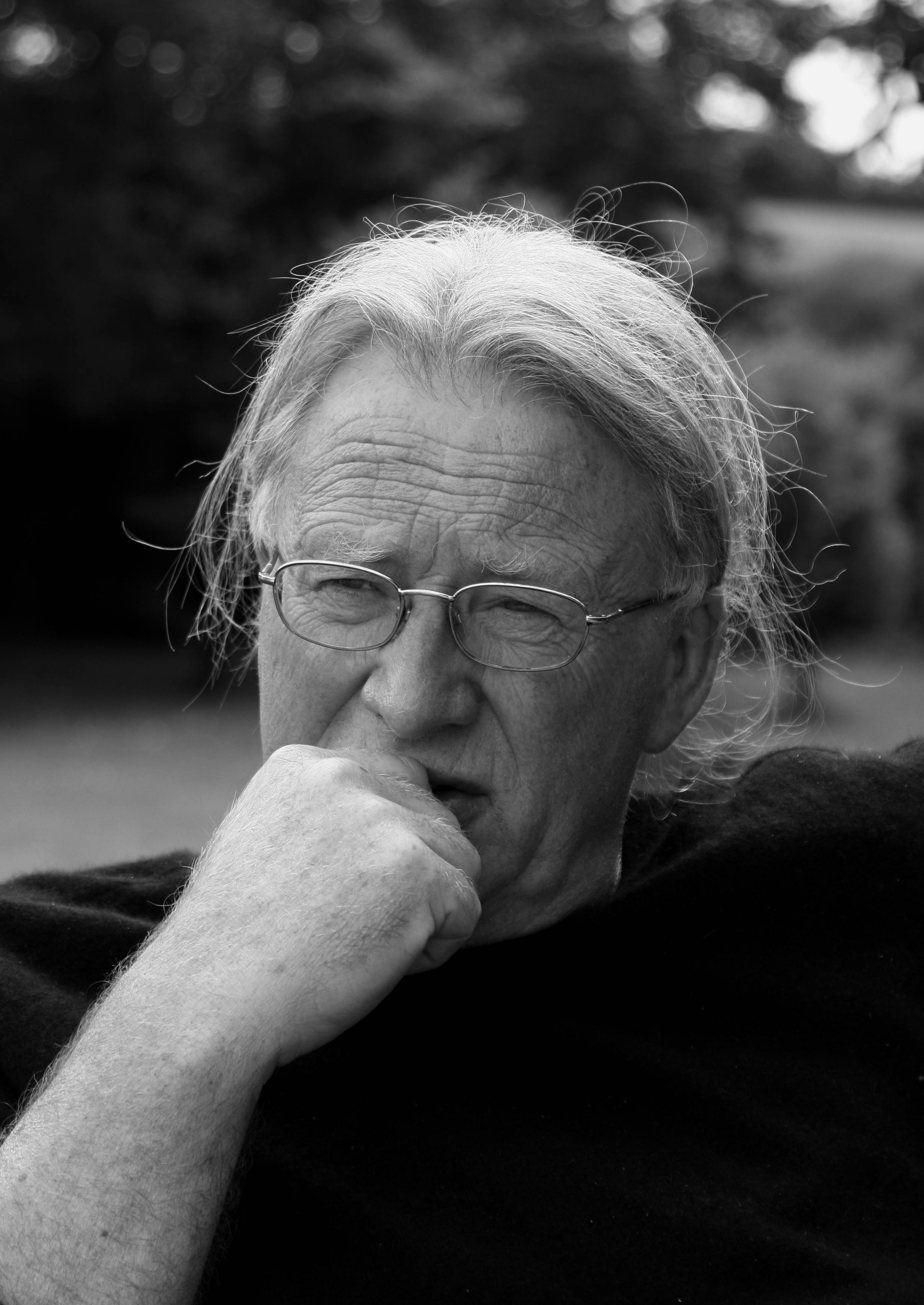
Ian McKeever

Ian McKeever RA (born 30 November 1946) is a contemporary British artist. Since 1990 McKeever has lived and worked in Hartgrove, Dorset, England.

== Biography ==
McKeever was born and raised in Withernsea, East Riding of Yorkshire. He studied English Literature and began working as an artist in 1968. In 1970 he took his first studio at SPACE, St. Katherine's dock, London, an artists' initiative set up by Bridget Riley and Peter Sedgley. His first group exhibition was held in West Berlin in 1971, and this was soon followed by his first solo exhibition at Cardiff Arts Centre. He was awarded the Arts Council Bursary in 1973 and in the same year held his first London solo exhibition at the Institute of Contemporary Arts (ICA). In 1989 he was awarded the DAAD scholarship in Berlin. This was followed in 1990 by a major retrospective exhibition of his work at the Whitechapel Gallery, London. In 2003 he was elected a Royal Academician.

== Works ==
McKeever's early landscape photographic/drawing works such as Field Series (1978 and Waterfalls (1979) were influenced by the writings of Robert Smithson, followed by the over-painted landscape photographs in such groups as Lapland Paintings (1985–1986) and History of Rocks (1986–1988) where the painterly gesture comes to the fore. And finally, beginning with the Door Paintings (1990–1994), McKeever's works became more concerned with pure painting hovering between abstraction and a residual sense of figuration. This phase continues to this day in such groups of paintings as Temple Paintings (2004–2006) and Twelve-Standing (2009–2012) with an increased paring down of discernible subject matter in the work and an emphasis on the quality of light.

"Light in a painting intrigues me enormously: how to imbue a painting with light so that one is not actually depicting it, but somehow its quality is implicitly within the painting— [...] emanating from it."

In 2006 McKeever returned to working with photographs, however they are now kept independent of his painted works.

== Gallery ==
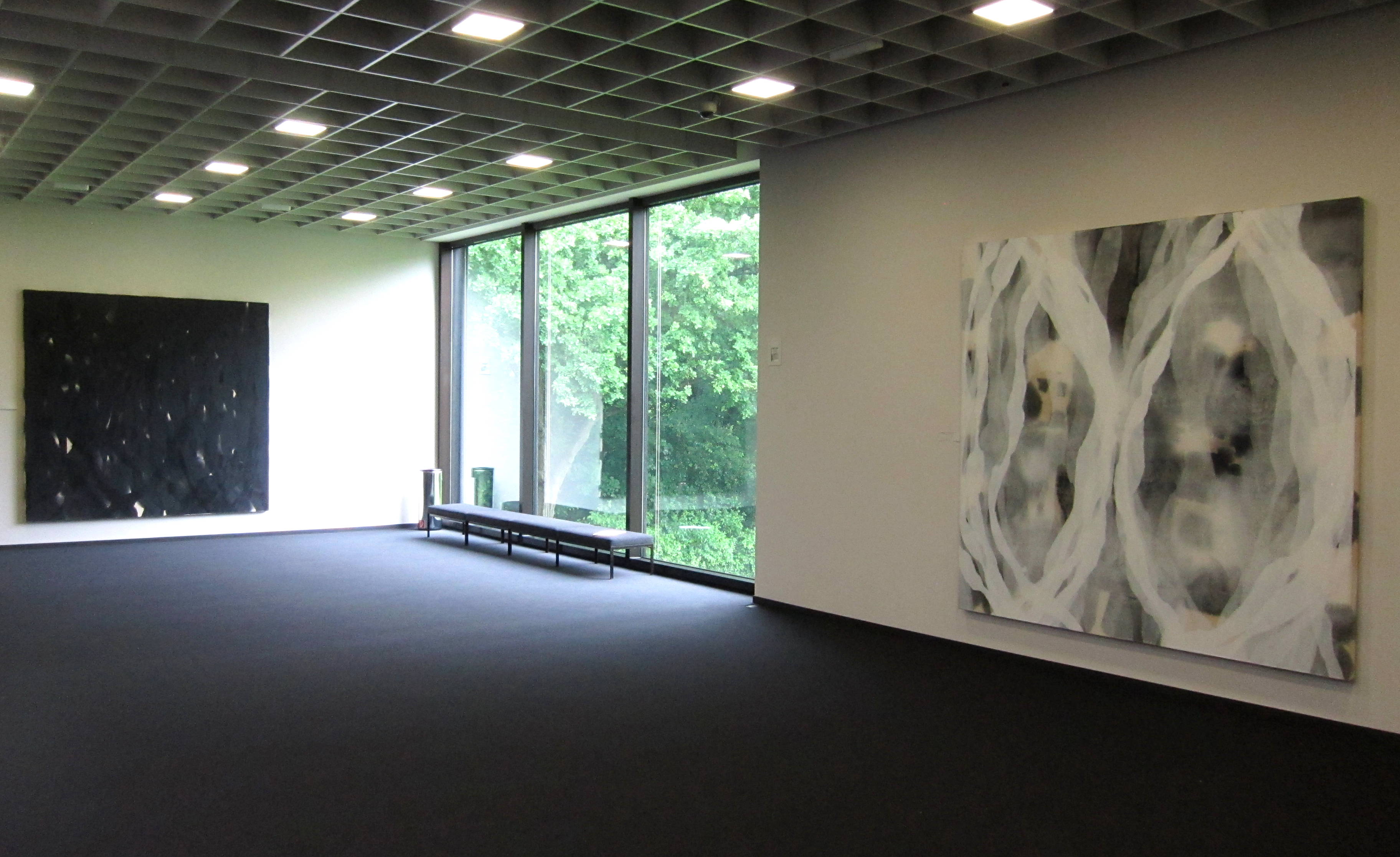
McKeever, Hartgrove Paintings at the Josef Albers Museum, Bottrop, 2012

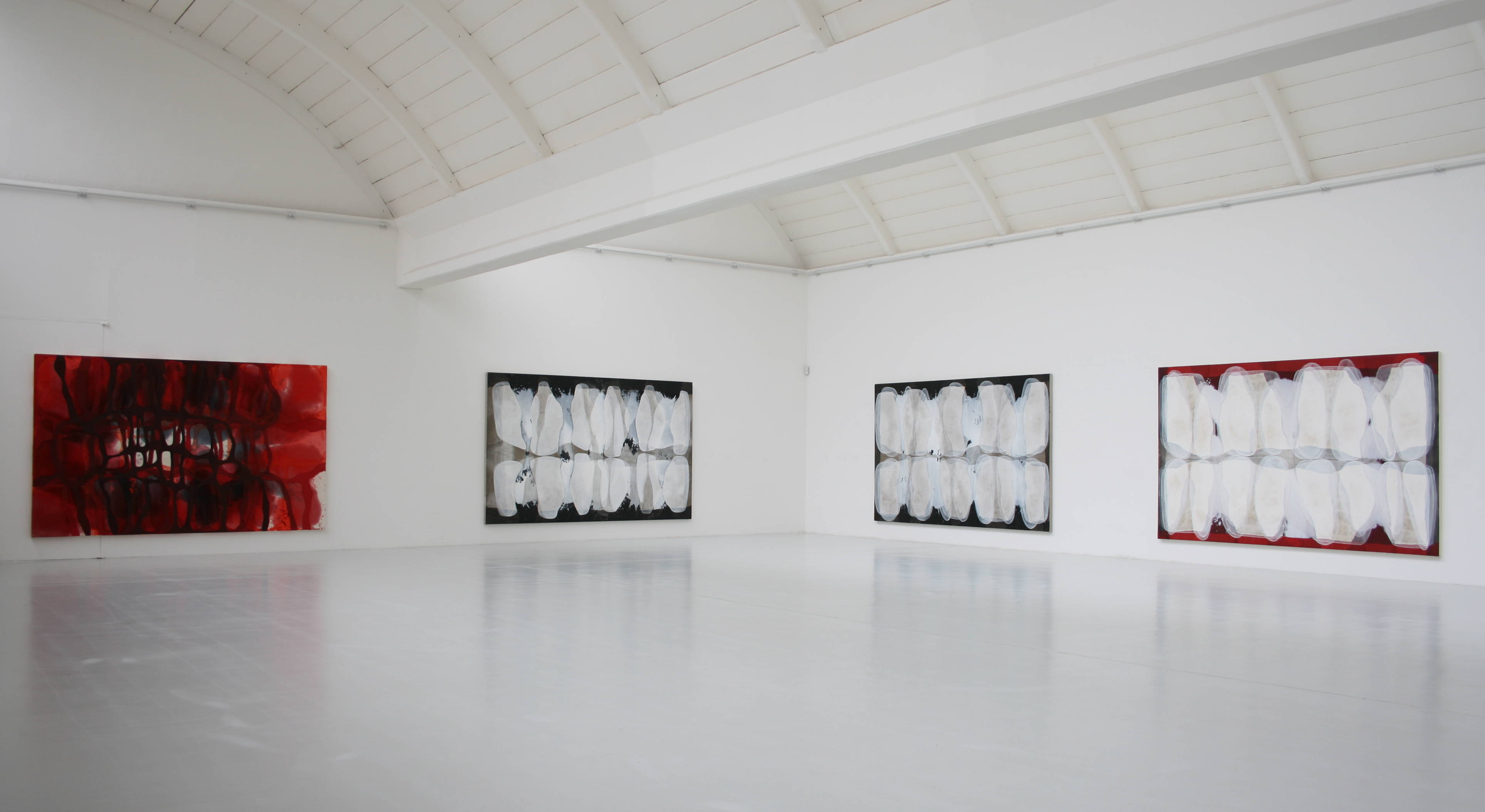
McKeever at the Morat Institute, Freiburg i.Br., 2007

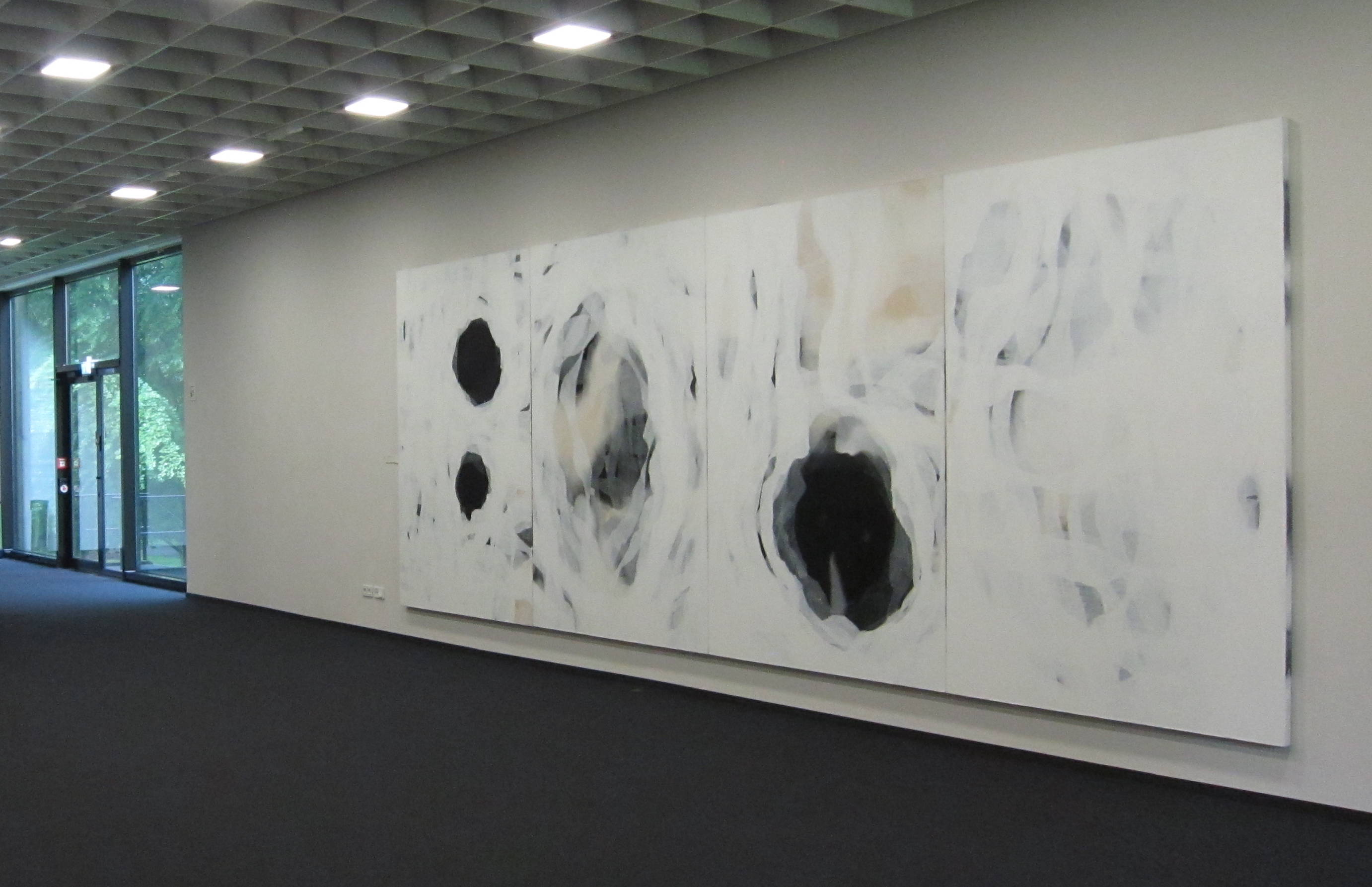
McKeever, Marianne North at the Josef Albers Museum, Bottrop, 2012

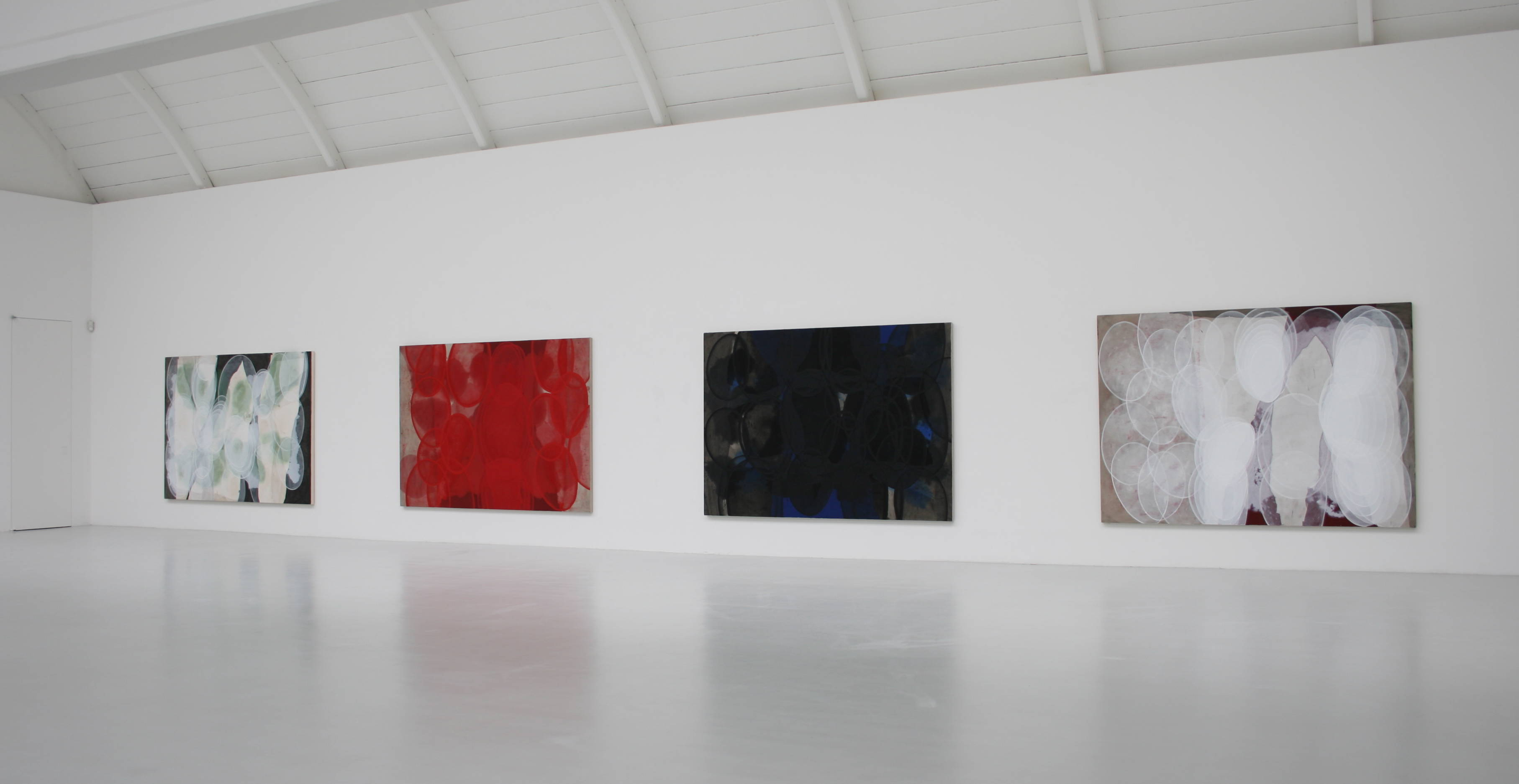
McKeever, Assembly Paintings at the Morat Institute, Freiburg i.Br., 2007

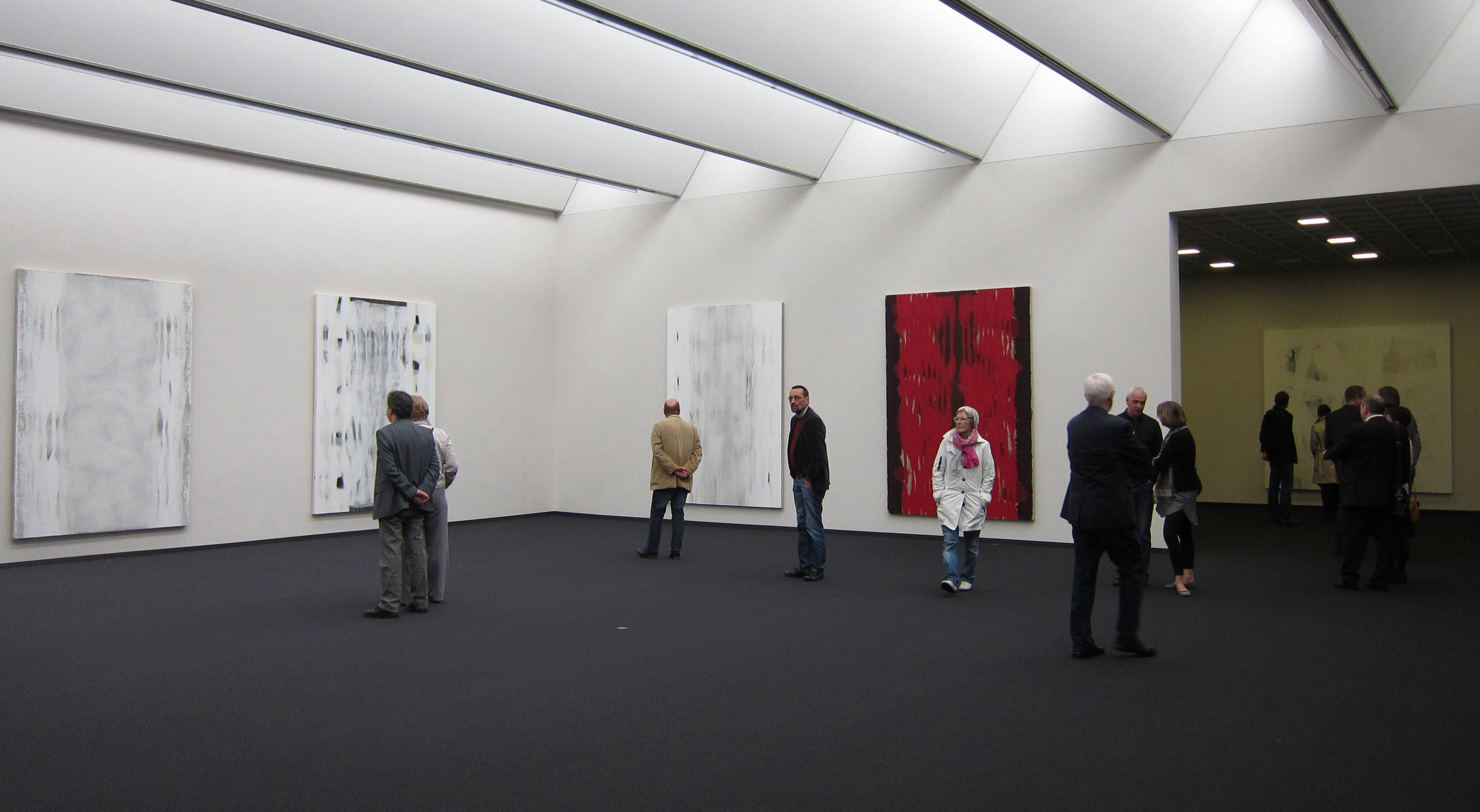
McKeever, Twelve-Standing at the Josef Albers Museum, Bottrop, 2012

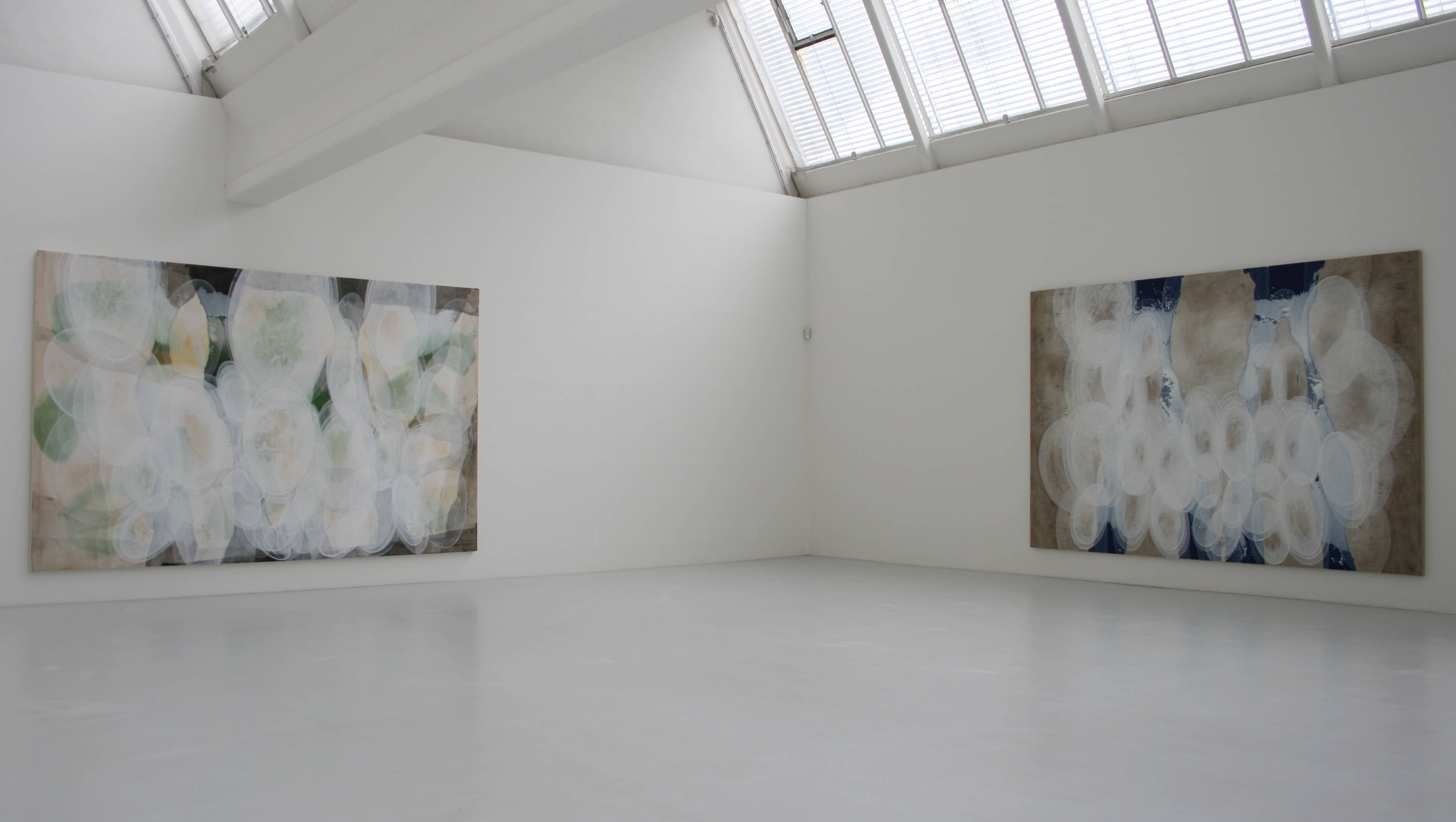
McKeever, Temple Paintings at the Morat Institute, Freiburg i.Br., 2007

== Writings ==
McKeever has written numerous texts and essays on art, including personal reflections on painting and on other painters' works. His 1982 manifesto titled Black and White...Or how to paint with a hammer (published by Matt's Gallery, London), expounded his internal conflict between the subjective nature of painting and the more conceptual parameters his work had adhered to so far. In 2005, his lectures at Cambridge University and the University of Brighton were published as three essays in the book In Praise of Painting, covering topics such as the presence and absence of light in Western painting. Writings on other artists include Thoughts on Emil Nolde in 1996; Absolute Light, an essay on Russian icons for the British Museum magazine in 2004; and Thinking about Georgia O'Keeffe for the Louisiana Revy, Louisiana Museum of Modern Art, Humlebæk, Denmark.

== Exhibitions ==
Selected Exhibitions

- 2012 Josef Albers Museum, Bottrop; National Museum of Norway, Oslo
- 2011 Sønderjylands Kunstmuseum, Tønder; Tate Britain, London
- 2010 Royal Academy of Arts, London
- 2009 Kings Place Gallery, London
- 2008 Alan Cristea Gallery, London
- 2007 Morat-Institut für Kunst und Kunstwissenschaft, Freiburg i.Br.; Tate St Ives, Cornwall
- 2006 New Carlsberg Glyptotek, Copenhagen
- 2005 National Art Gallery, Beijing; Shanghai Art Museum, Shanghai
- 2004 Kettle's Yard, Cambridge
- 2003 Nordiska Akvarellmuseet, Skärhamn
- 2002 Horsens Kunstmuseum
- 2001 Kunsthallen Brandts, Odense
- 1999 Yale Center for British Art, Newhaven, Connecticut
- 1995 Matt's Gallery, London; Scottish National Gallery of Modern Art, Edinburgh; Yale Center for British Art, New Haven, Connecticut; Tate Gallery, London
- 1993 Stephen Solovy Gallery, Chicago
- 1992 Museum Folkwang, Essen
- 1991 Musée Cantonal des Beaux-Arts, Lausanne
- 1990 DAAD Galerie, West Berlin; Whitechapel Art Gallery, London
- 1989 Kunstforum, Städtische Galerie im Lenbachhaus, Munich; Tate Gallery, Liverpool
- 1988 Guinness Hop Store, Dublin
- 1987 Arnolfini, Bristol; Kunstverein Braunschweig; Museum of Modern Art, Oxford; Royal Museums of Art and History, Brussels,
- 1986 Frankfurter Kunstverein / Schirn Kunsthalle, Frankfurt
- 1985 Galerie Nächst St Stephan, Vienna; Walker Art Gallery, Liverpool; Moderna Museet, Stockholm
- 1983 Bonner Kunstverein, Bonn
- 1982 Kunsthalle Nürnberg
- 1981 Walker Art Gallery, Liverpool; Museum of Modern Art, Oxford; Institute of Contemporary Arts, London
- 1979 Nigel Greenwood Gallery, London
- 1978 Richard Demarco Gallery, Edinburgh; Galleria Foksal, Warsaw
- 1976 Ikon Gallery, Birmingham; Badischer Kunstverein, Karlsruhe

== Collections ==
Selected Collections:

- Arts Council of Great Britain, London
- British Council, London
- British Museum, London
- Government Art Collection of Great Britain, London
- The Royal Academy of Art, London
- Tate Gallery, London
- Birmingham Museum and Art Gallery, Birmingham
- Scottish National Gallery of Modern Art, Edinburgh
- Museum des 20. Jahrhunderts, Vienna, Austria
- Horsens Kunstmuseum, Horsens, Denmark
- Louisiana Museum of Modern Art, Humlebæk, Denmark
- New Carlsberg Foundation and New Carlsberg Glyptotek, Copenhagen, Denmark
- Sønderjyllands Kunstmuseum, Tønder, Denmark
- Museum of Contemporary Art, Helsinki, Finland
- Porin Taidemuseo, Pori, Finland
- Morat-Institut für Kunst und Kunstwissenschaft, Freiburg, Germany
- Kunsthalle Kiel, Germany
- Kunsthalle Nürnberg, Nuremberg, Germany
- Museum of Fine Art, Budapest, Hungary
- Nordic Aquarell Museum, Skärham, Sweden
- National Gallery of South Africa, Johannesburg
- Boston Museum of Fine Art, Boston, USA
- Brooklyn Museum of Art, New York City
- Cincinnati Museum of Modern Art, Cincinnati, USA
- The Haggerty Museum of Modern Art, Milwaukee, USA
- Metropolitan Museum of Art, New York City
- MIT List Visual Arts Center, Massachusetts, USA
- Yale Center for British Art, Connecticut, USA
