= University of South Florida Contemporary Art Museum =

Museum in Tampa, Florida

The University of South Florida Contemporary Art Museum is a contemporary art museum at the University of South Florida in Tampa, Florida. It opened at its current location adjacent to the USF College of the Arts in 1989.

The museum is accredited by the American Alliance of Museums and is funded by the Florida Department of State, the Florida Arts Council and the Division of Cultural Affairs, the National Endowment for the Arts, the Arts Council of Hillsborough County, the Hillsborough County Board of County Commissioners, and privately.

CAM maintains USF's permanent collection of over 5,000 art works. A majority of the collection can be viewed in an online visual database.

== Gallery ==
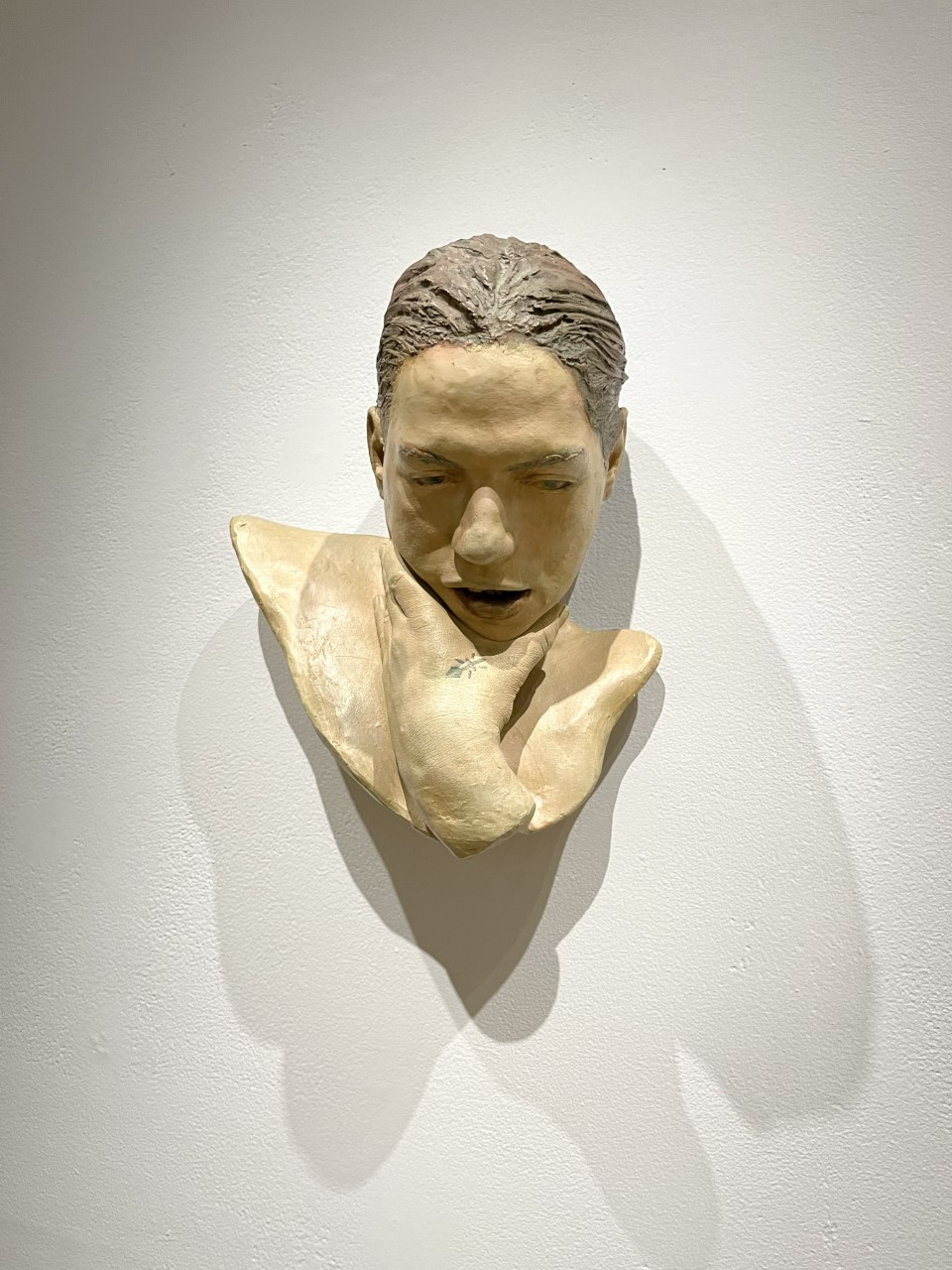
John Ahearn, Luis Fuentes, South Bronx, 1979. Plaster and acrylic. Displayed in USF Contemporary Art Museum's 2023 exhibit "Poor People's Art: A (Short) Visual History of Poverty in the United States."

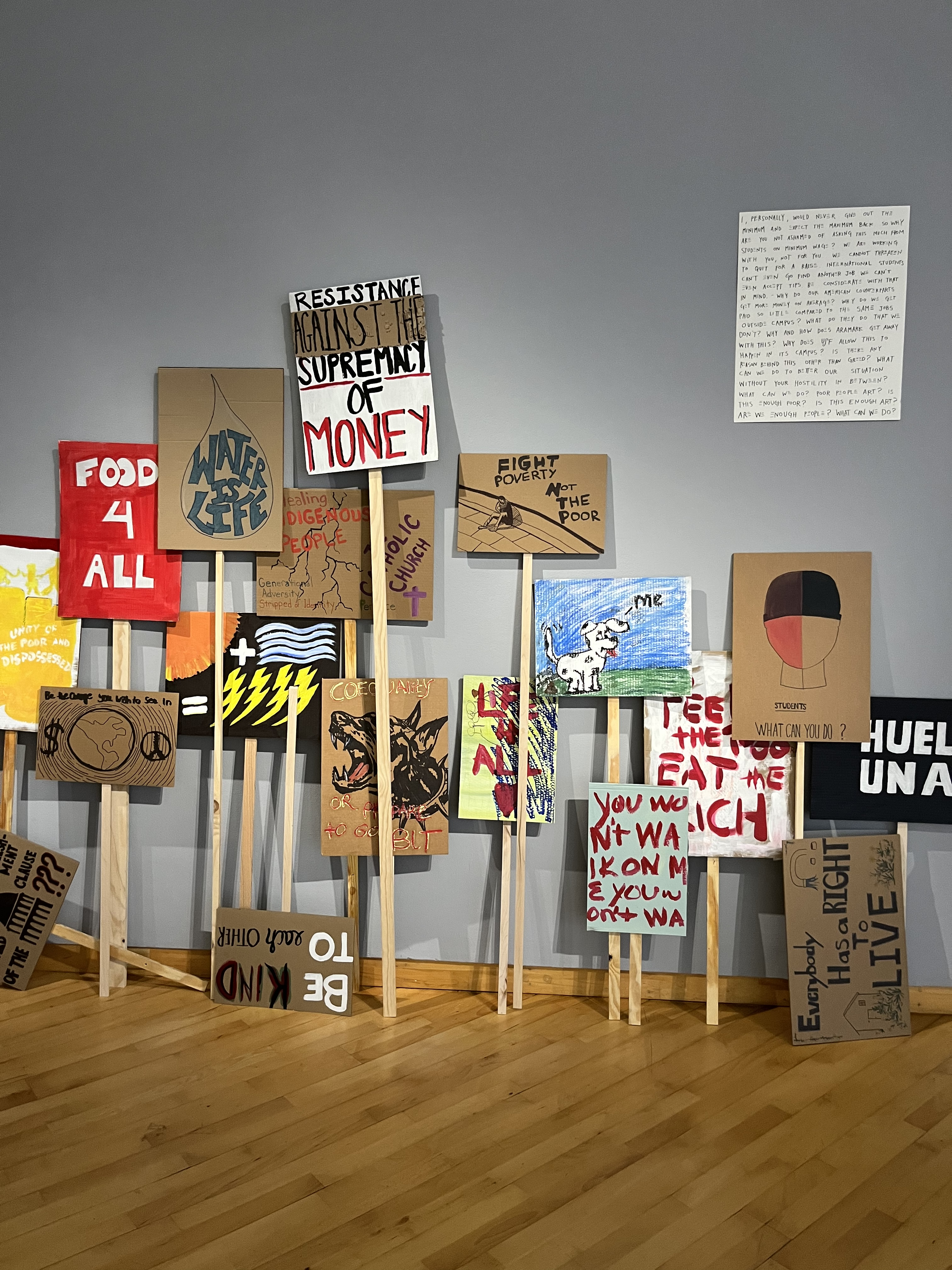
Placards inspired by Poor People's Campaign posters created by USF students, faculty, and staff in a workshop on November 4, 2022. Displayed in USF Contemporary Art Museum's 2023 exhibit "Poor People’s Art: A (Short) Visual History of Poverty in the United States."

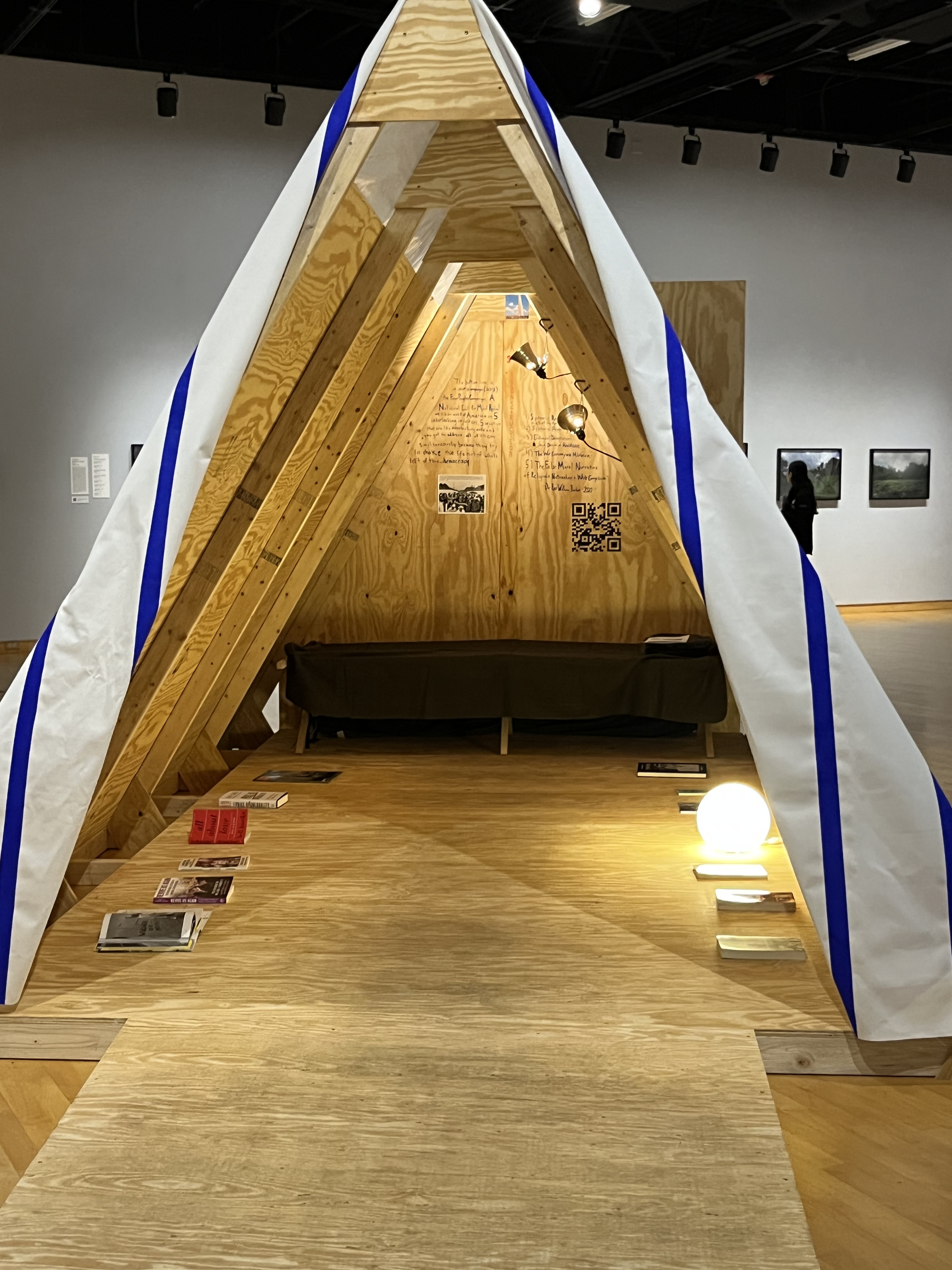
Jason Lazarus, For Resurrection City, 2018. Plywood, utility fabric, blanket, 1968 political literature library, paint, plastic. 10 x 16 x 10 feet. Displayed in USF Contemporary Art Museum's 2023 exhibit "Poor People’s Art: A (Short) Visual History of Poverty in the United States."

== See also ==
- List of museums in Florida
- University of South Florida
