= Hannah Collins =

British contemporary artist and film-maker

Hannah Collins (born 1956) is a British contemporary artist and filmmaker. Collins' works treat the collective experiences of memory, history and the everyday in the modern world. She is known for her photographic installations, but has also made films in Spain and Russia. She was nominated for the 1993 Turner Prize.

== Biography ==
Collins studied at Slade School of Fine Arts in London (1974–78) and in USA on a Fulbright Scholarship (1978–79).

Collins' works form a reflection on issues such as the collective experiences of memory, the spaces that have marked and continue to mark cultural and social history, and figures in everyday life and in modern life. Her work incorporates notions of otherness, time, loss and transformation, and spans historical narratives, still lives and occasional portraits within an expanded field of photography.

She has made films with Romani in Spain and in Russia living for extensive periods of time amongst the community. She has also made extensive photographic works with tribal groups in the Colombian Amazon.

Besides her activity as a plastic artist, she has taught in schools such as the University of California, Davis, and the Royal College of Art. She was visiting professor at Le Fresnoy, Studio nacional des Arts Contemporains, Roubaix, in 2007–08.

She has had many international exhibitions and her work is in numerous public and private collections including Tate Modern, Centre Georges Pompidou, MACBA Barcelona, Reina Sofia Madrid, Dallas Museum of Art, the Luxembourg Museum, and the Sprengel Museum Hannover.

She has won several prizes including the Spectrum Award from the Sprengel Museum Hannover (2015), the European Photography Award (1991) and the Olympus Award (2004). She was nominated for the Turner Prize (1993).

== Filmography ==
2001

La Cantante – Produced by Basilisk Communications, London

2002

La Mina – Produced by Hannah Collins and Mercury Films

2006

Current History - Produced by Hannah Collins
Beshencevo – A Current History – Produced by Hannah Collins, Biennale de Sevilla, Film London

2007

Parallel – Produced by Basilisk Communications, London
La Mina 2001–2007 – Produced by Seacex, Spain

2008

Solitude and Company – Produced by Hannah Collins and Le Fresnoy, Studio National, France.

== Books ==
- Noah Purifoy, Hannah Collins, Steidl Books, 2017. Hannah Collins, Sprengel Museum catalogue Kehrer Books Germany, 2015.
- The Fragile Feast. Routes to Ferran Adria, Ed. Hatje Cantz, Germany, 2011.
- La revelación del Tiempo - Time Will Reveal It All, Museo de Arte de la Universidad de Colombia, 2010.
- Parallal, ACTAR, Barcelona 2008.
- Hannah Collins, Filming Things, Centre national de la photographie, Echo Books, 1997
- Finding, Transmitting, Receiving, Hannah Collins, Black Dog Publishing, 2007.
- Shopping, ed Echo Books, Barcelona 1996.
- A Worldwide Case of Homesickness, ed. Irish Museum of Modern Art, Dublin, 1996.
- The Hunter's Space, ed. Chisenhale Gallery, London, Cornerhouse Manchester, 1985.
- Legends, ed. Matt's Gallery, Institute of Contemporary Arts London; Orchard Gallery Londonderry, 1998

== Multiples ==
- Hair Shawl, Hannah Collins, produced and published in 1997 by Les Maîtres de Forme Contemporains (mfc-michèle didier). Silk screened and hand painted image.
- Edition for Camden Art Centre, 2015 produced by the artist. Silkscreened silver gelatin print.
- Magic in Nature. Edition for Whitechapel Gallery, London, produced by the artist. Selenium toned silver gelatin print with hand printed label, framed.
