= Peggy Preheim =

- Born: 1963; Yankton, South Dakota
- Education: Minneapolis College of Art and Design

Peggy Preheim (born 1963) is an American artist.

== Early life and education ==
Preheim was born in Yankton, South Dakota and was educated at the Minneapolis College of Art and Design from 1981 to 1983.

== Collections ==
Preheim's work is included in the collections of the Museum of Modern Art New York, the Denver Art Museum and the Whitney Museum of American Art.
