= Mark Titchner =

English artist

- Born: 1973 (age 52–53); Luton, England, UK
- Education: Central Saint Martins College of Art and Design, London
- Occupation: Artist
- Website: http://marktitchner.com/

Mark Titchner (born 1973) is an English artist and 2006 nominee for the Turner Prize. He lives and works in London. Focusing on an exploration of words and language, in recent years much of his production has been based in the public realm both in the UK and internationally. These public works have often been created from extended group activities.

== Early life ==
Titchner was born in Luton and grew up in the adjacent town of Dunstable. He graduated from Central Saint Martins College of Art and Design, London, in 1995.

== Career ==
In 2006 Titchner was nominated for the Turner Prize for a solo show at the Arnolfini, Bristol, in which he displayed the sculptural installation "How To Change Behaviour (Tiny Masters Of The World Come Out)". The Tate Gallery described his work in the following manner:

... hybrid installations furthered his exploration into systems of belief. Working across a wide range of media, including light boxes and extraordinary hand-carved contraptions, his work continues to interweave a vast array of references from heavy metal lyrics to philosophy.

In 2007 he was included in the 52nd Venice Biennale exhibiting in Ukraine's Pavilion, A Poem about an Inland Sea. A solo exhibition Run, Black River, Run followed at BALTIC, Gateshead early in 2008. His book WHY AND WHY NOT was published by Bookworks in 2004.

In 2003, he had a solo show Be Angry but Don't Stop Breathing as part of the Art Now series at Tate Britain.

In 2011, he had a solo show "Be True to Your Oblivion" at The New Art Gallery Walsall. This exhibition formed part of Capsule's Home of Metal project, a huge cultural project to establish Birmingham and the Black Country as the home of heavy metal. He was the Art Gallery of Ontario's Artist-in-Residence from September to October 2012. He is regularly working in public (e.g. Blackpool in 2016, Manchester in 2017, Royal Bethlem Hospital London in 2019, Colchester in 2020) where his works reach a broad audience and attention.

His work is held in the permanent collections of The Arts Council, British Council, South London Gallery, the United Kingdom Government Art Collection and the Tate Gallery.

== Exhibitions ==
- Mark Titchner (2014) CGP and Dilston Grove, London
- Be true to your Oblivion (2011) New Art Gallery Walsall
- Run, Black River, Run (2008) Baltic, Gateshead
- We Were Thinking of Evolving (2003), Vilma Gold, London
- Bag Lady! (2003), Cell Project Space, London
- Electric Earth (2003), International British Council touring show
- The Galleries Show (2002), Royal Academy, London
- Playing amongst the Ruins (2001), Royal College of Art, London
- City Racing (A Partial History) (2001), ICA, London

== Selected public works ==
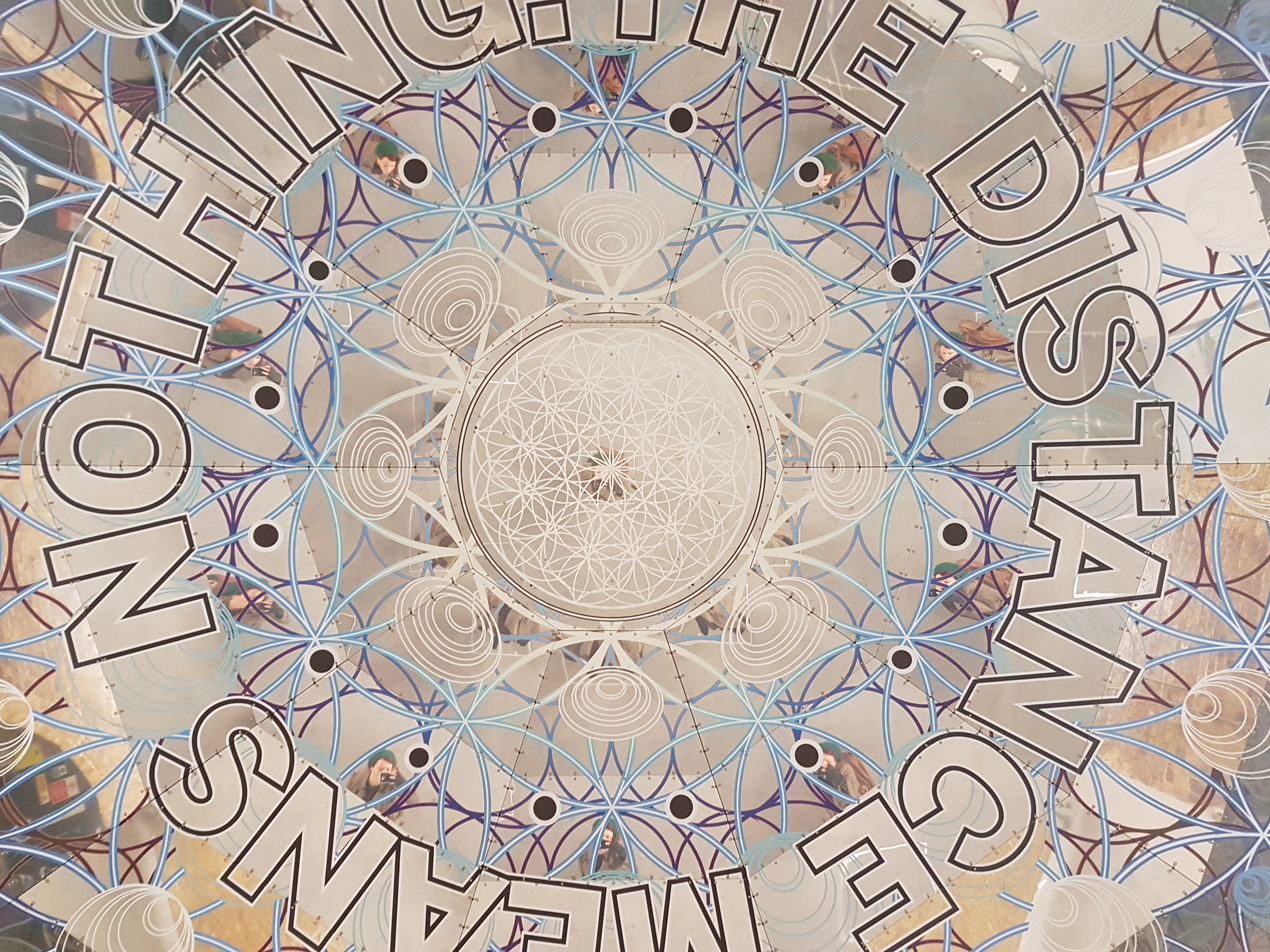
Close-up of Me. Here. Now.

- Me. Here. Now. (2018) London Bridge Station - Stainer Street Art commission
- What I want more than anything else, (2017) Various venues Hull, Wigan, Leigh & Burnley. Commissioned by FACT
- Beacon, (2016) The Hat Factory, Luton
- Live the life that you imagine, (2015) One St Peters Square, Manchester
- Our work is today together, (2015 ) Sceaux Gardens Estate, London (Commissioned by South London Gallery)

== See also ==
- Book Works
- Big 4 (statue)
