= Stuart Morgan (art critic) =

British art critic (1948–2002)

Stuart Morgan (25 January 1948 – 28 August 2002) was a Welsh art critic and editor.

Morgan "became known during the 1980s in Europe and the United States as the most significant British writer on contemporary art." He was an editor of Artscribe. He also published interviews with artists including Tracey Emin.
