= Phil Collins (photographer) =

English artist

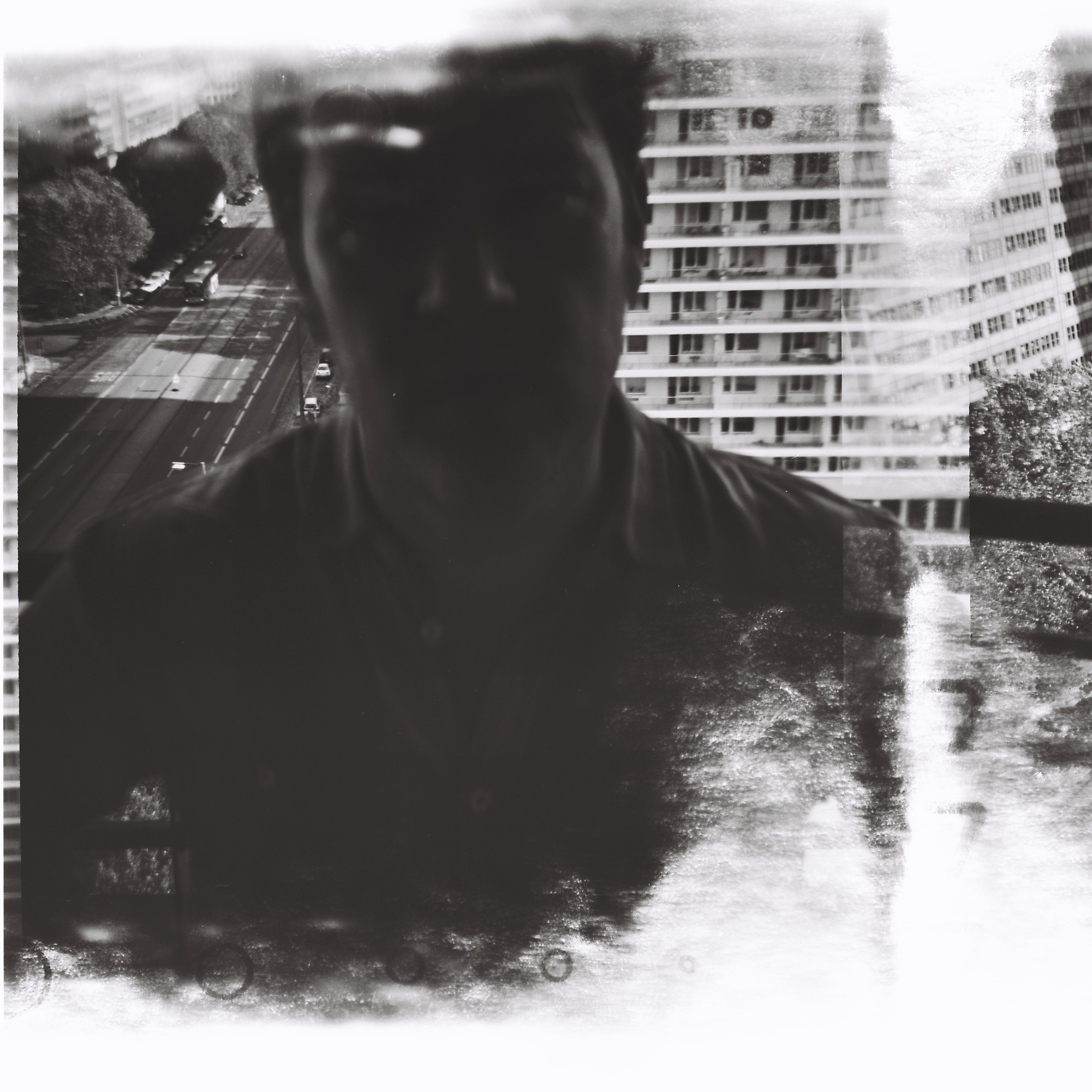
Phil Collins

Phil Collins (born 1970) is an English artist and Turner prize nominee. He is mainly known for video art, often featuring teenagers. A prominent example of his work is They Shoot Horses (2004), consisting of two videos, each lasting seven hours, and shown at the same time on different walls.

Collins has been Professor of Video Art and Performance at the Academy of Media Arts Cologne since 2011.

== Life and work ==
Phil Collins was born in Runcorn, England and now lives in Berlin. He studied drama and English at the University of Manchester, graduating in 1994. During his time there he worked as a cloak-room boy and barman at the Haçienda nightclub on Whitworth Street. After a stint teaching performance and film theory at Royal Holloway, University of London, he joined London-based performance group Max Factory whose live art projects were held all over the UK.

In 1998 he moved to Belfast to do a Master of Fine Arts at the College of Art and Design, part of the University of Ulster. His teachers included Alistair Maclennan and Willie Doherty. During his time in Northern Ireland he became an active member of the artist-run collective Catalyst Arts.

While still a student he was selected, as one of just four other artists from Northern Ireland, to show at Manifesta 3 in Ljubljana, Slovenia. He showed the first video he had ever made called How To Make A Refugee – an 11-minute film shot on the refugee camps at Stenkovec and Čegrane in Macedonia during the Kosovo crisis of 1999. In 2015, the Metropolitan Museum of Art exhibited the film in Phil Collins: how to make a refugee.”

After completing his MA he spent some time living and working in Belgrade. In 2000 he was picked as one of the New Contemporaries and in the same year won the Absolute Prize. In 2001 he won a Paul Hamlyn Award for visual arts.

He was nominated for the 2006 Turner Prize for solo shows at Milton Keynes Gallery, Tanya Bonakdar Gallery, New York, and also for his work in the British Art Show 6. The Tate Gallery describes his work as "engaging photographic and video installations involving diverse social groups. Acting as a catalyst, he encourages people to reveal their individuality, making the personal public with sensitivity and generosity."

For his Turner Prize entry Collins created a fully functioning office called 'Shady Lane Productions' in the gallery at Tate Britain. It was staffed with journalists and researchers who worked a normal 9am-5pm day, on full pay, for the duration of the show in full view of gallery visitors. These office workers were looking for candidates to appear in The Return of the Real, a documentary about people whose lives had been ruined by reality TV. Turner Prize judge Andrew Renton said, "To call Phil Collins a prankster would be to underestimate the seriousness of his work. His work is clearly political and connected to social engagement."

In The Return of the Real, former participants from shows as diverse as Wife Swap, Brand New You, and Supernanny were given the opportunity to candidly recount their stories and air their grievances in unedited conversations with media lawyer Mark Stephens. Stephens said, "I am troubled by the way in which television has exploited its subjects in the cynical pursuit of commercial gain and infotainment. My interest in this project arises from those concerns and I was pleased to be able to help facilitate the voices of those involved, voices which are so often censored by the media which has already misrepresented them."

His best-known works are video art, often featuring teenagers. In 2002 he travelled to Saddam Hussein's Baghdad, before the start of the Iraq War, and filmed Iraqis sitting silently for screen tests for a non-existent Hollywood movie (Baghdad Screen Tests, 2002). His best known work is They Shoot Horses (2004) consisting of two videos each lasting seven hours and shown at the same time on different walls. This is a record of a disco dance marathon staged by the artist with nine Palestinians in Ramallah. Music from the last three decades is played and the young people are captured in a single camera take, as they dance or, at times, stand round or slump to the floor. Another similar work was The World Won't Listen (2005), which features young people in Turkey, Colombia, and Indonesia performing karaoke versions of Smiths songs.

About his work Collins has said, "A camera brings interested parties together. It attracts and repels according to circumstance or whim. A camera makes me interested in you and you maybe interested in me. In this sense, it's all about love. And exploitation. You could say that [this work] is driven by an emotional relationship with the subjects, rather than the rational or sensational standards of journalism, which also inhabit these territories."

Collins has been Professor of Video Art and Performance at the Academy of Media Arts Cologne since 2011.

== See also ==
- Video art
