= Creative Capital =

Non-profit arts funding organization

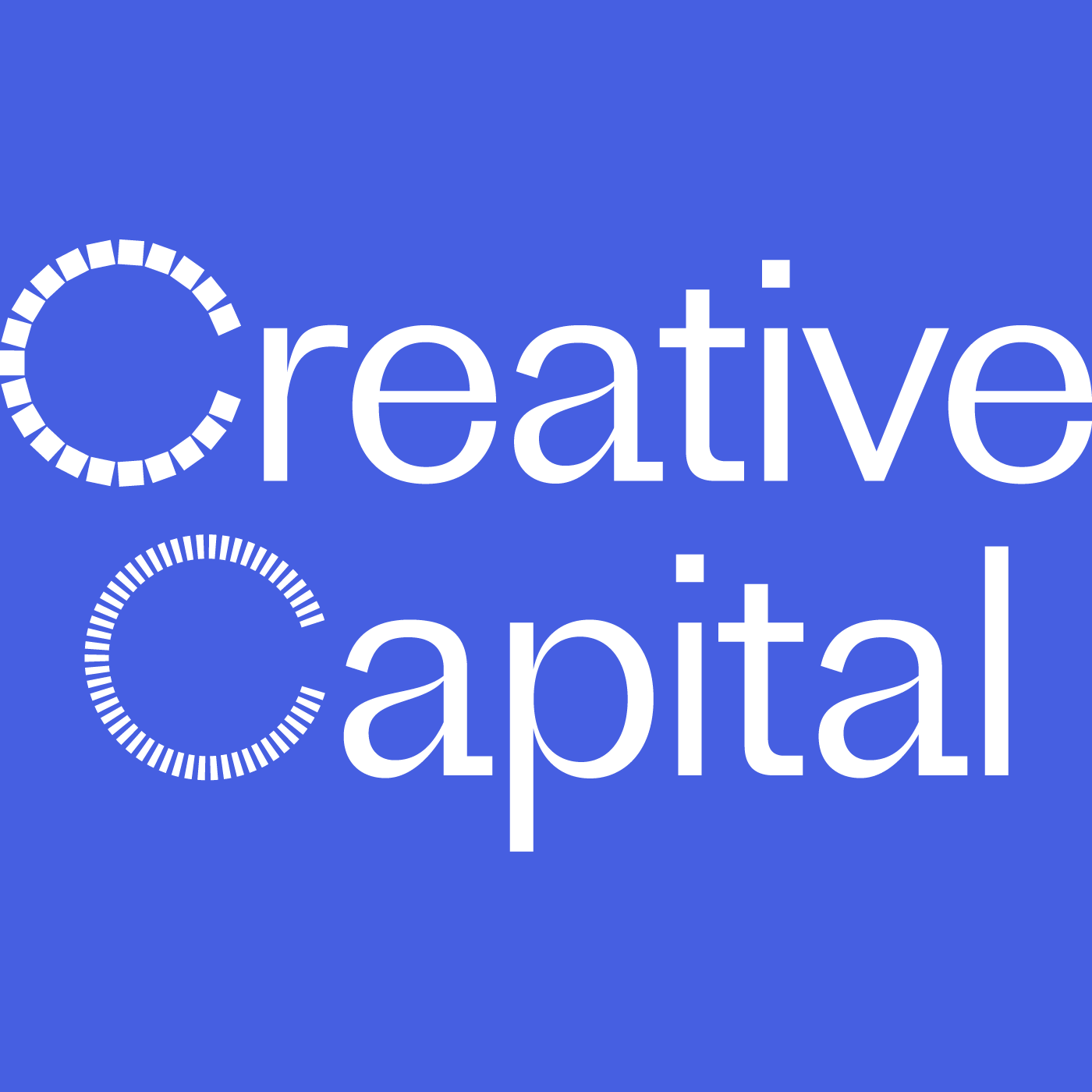
- Formation: 1999
- Type: Philanthropic nonprofit arts organization
- Location: New York City
- Services: Visual artists, performing artists, literary artists, and multidisciplinary artists in the United States
- Methods: Awards grants up to $50,000 to individual artists and artist services valued at an additional $50,000; provides artist workshops, educational programming, and artist gatherings across the United States
- President & Executive Director: Christine Kuan (2021-Present); Suzy Delvalle (2016-2020)
- Founding Director: Ruby Lerner (1999-2016)
- Website: Creative-Capital.org

Creative Capital is a 501(c)3 nonprofit organization based in New York City that supports artists across the United States through funding, counsel, gatherings, and career development services. Founded in 1999, Creative Capital says that they have committed over $50 million in project funding and advisory support to 631 projects representing 783 artists and has worked with thousands more artists across the country through workshops and other resources. One of the "most prestigious art grants in the country," their yearly Creative Capital Awards application is open to artists in over 40 different disciplines spanning the visual arts, performing arts, moving image, literature, technology, and socially-engaged art.

== History ==
During the "culture wars" of the 1990s, the National Endowment for the Arts's (NEA) cut funding for individual artists. In response, Arch Gillies of the Andy Warhol Foundation for the Visual Arts spearheaded the creation of a new organization that would directly fund individual artists. Creative Capital began in 1999 with Ruby Lerner as founding director. The announcement of the organization appeared on the front page of The New York Times, noting that Creative Capital would "actively advocate freedom of expression" and "support artists who challenge convention".

In its first year, Creative Capital selected 75 artists to receive the Creative Capital Award. In 2002, the organization launched their first Artist Retreat at Skowhegan School of Painting. This in-person meeting of artists and professionals became a core part of Creative Capital's model, allowing for an exchange of ideas and as well as a platform to spark new connections within the community.

Creative Capital has supported works whose creators have become recognized in their fields and beyond, including Paul Beatty's The Sellout, Yance Ford’s Strong Island, Bill Morrison's Decasia, Bandaloop's Crossing, Sam Van Aken’s Tree of 40 Fruits, Jae Rhim Lee’s Infinity Burial Project, Maggie Nelson’s The Argonauts, as well as early works by artists including Taylor Mac, Sanford Biggers, Laura Poitras, and Jeffrey Gibson.

In 2019, Creative Capital, in partnership with the Los Angeles Review of Books, invited several writers to examine projects from each award cycle year in the organization's first two decades.

== Creative Capital Awards ==
Through an open application process, Creative Capital identifies and selects artists from all disciplines to receive the Creative Capital Award. The award gives each project access to up to $50,000 in direct funding allocated at key intervals in project development, combined with additional mentorship and advisory services.

While there were a total of 12 award cycles from 2000 to 2019, in 2019, Creative Capital switched to a new annual award cycle.

== Philanthropic model and artist services ==
Creative Capital calls for artists to submit their project ideas through a free and open application for the Creative Capital Awards. After selecting artists for the awards, the organization applies a venture philanthropy model to help those artists develop their projects with funding, professional development, and advisory services, including artist coaching, communications and promotion, strategic planning, and legal and financial counsel. The award gives artists access to a series of artist gatherings, like Creative Capital Carnival, designed to connect them with a community of artists and professionals who can help realize and present their work at venues and organizations all over the world.

Creative Capital's approach centers on the idea that time and advisory services are as important to the creative process as money. As awardees' funded projects develop, Creative Capital staff meet with them to set goals and chart progress. Creative Capital provides funding at benchmark moments for each project, including initial funding, support to build the artist's personal and professional capacity, follow-up support for project production, funding for the project's premiere, and support for the project's expansion after its premiere. Of this type of support, Sheryl Oring, a Creative Capital awardee, has said, "For mid-career artists like me, Creative Capital can help make the difference between whether we keep making art or give up."

=== Notable awardees include ===
Performing arts

Performing arts works funded by Creative Capital often blur the genres, including musical performance, theater, comedy, puppetry, dance, jazz, and multimedia installation. Notable projects include James Scruggs's 3/Fifths, Robin Frohardt's The Plastic Bag Store, Kyle Abraham's Dearest Home, Nick Cave's Drop, Taylor Mac's The Lily’s Revenge, and Young Jean Lee's Lear.

- Nick Cave
- Raja Feather Kelly
- Vijay Iyer
- Meredith Monk
- Taylor Mac
- Du Yun
- Ralph Lemon
- Jane Comfort
- John Jasperse
- James Luna
- Richard Maxwell
- Richard Move
- Basil Twist
- Kristina Wong
- Michelle Ellsworth
- Branden Jacobs-Jenkins and Carmelita Tropicana

Visual Arts

Visual arts projects that have received Creative Capital Awards include installation, painting, sculpture, photography, and public art. Notable funded projects include Abigail DeVille's The Bronx: History of Now, Richard Pell's Center for PostNatural History, Jennie C. Jones's Counterpoint, Critical Art Ensemble’s GenTerra, and Lead Pencil Studios’ Maryhill Double.

- Janine Antoni
- Cassils
- Mariam Ghani
- Narcissister
- My Barbarian
- Lorraine O'Grady
- Wu Tsang
- Sanford Biggers
- Liz Cohen
- Theaster Gates
- Simone Leigh
- William Pope.L
- Xenobia Bailey
- LaToya Ruby Frazier
- Kerry Skarbakka

Moving image

Creative Capital projects in moving image include narrative and documentary film, short, episodic, and experimental film, animation, and video art. Notable projects include Penny Lane's documentary, Nuts!, Barbara Hammer's Resisting Paradise, Sam Green's The Weather Underground, as well as Yance Ford's Strong Island, and Daniel Sousa's Feral, both of which were nominated for Academy Awards.

- Wes Hurley
- Natalia Almada
- Sam Green
- Sonali Gulati
- Barbara Hammer
- Nina Menkes
- Elisabeth Subrin
- Jake Yuzna
- Jem Cohen
- Caveh Zahedi
- Travis Wilkerson
- Penny Lane
- Natalia Almada
- Yance Ford

Literature

Creative Capital began funding literature projects in 2005, including poetry, fiction, nonfiction, and hybrid literary works. Notable projects include Paul Beatty's The Sellout, Maggie Nelson's The Argonauts, and Bernadette Mayer's The Helens of Troy, New York.

- Jeffery Renard Allen
- Jesse Ball
- Paul Beatty
- Percival Everett
- Tonya Foster
- Kenny Fries
- Christian Hawkey
- Ben Marcus
- Bernadette Mayer
- Eileen Myles
- Maggie Nelson
- Rebecca Solnit
- Deb Olin Unferth

Emerging fields

Since 2000, Creative Capital has funded projects under a particular discipline they call "emerging fields", which includes disciplines not typically classified as art. As of 2019, the category has been broken out into more specific categories, such as technology, social practice, software, architecture & design. Some notable artists funded in this category include:

- Jae Rhim Lee
- Sam Van Aken
- DesertArtLAB
- Futurefarmers
- The Yes Men
- Angel Nevarez and Valerie Tevere
- Tale of Tales
- Liz Glynn
- KCHUNG Radio
- Tanya Aguiñiga
- Zach Blas
- Porpentine and Peter Burr
- Heather Dewey-Hagborg
- Eva and Franco Mattes
- Laura Parnes
- Evan Roth
- Shana Moulton and Nick Hallett

== Artist retreat and carnival ==
After each new round of awards was announced, Creative Capital would host a retreat for the artists, as well as people connected to Creative Capital in various ways who act as consultants, workshop leaders or observers. In various workshops and meetings with consultants, artists were advised on how to plan the coming years of their artistic careers as well their personal goals. In 2021, the Artist Retreat was replaced by Creative Capital Carnival, a day-long event for Creative Capital artists to connect with each other and network.

Creative Capital hosts a variety of events for awardees to meet each other and others within the artistic community. Critic Paddy Johnson wrote, "These conferences offer grantees an amazing opportunity to connect with other artists and a wide range of curators, distributors, and artistic directors through mixers, meetings with consultants, and artist presentations. They also ask grantees to return to the conference every couple of years, which keeps them in touch with a constantly expanding network of creative art folk."

At the Artist Retreat, awardees were asked to present their Creative Capital Award project ideas as a work-in-progress to a live audience of curators and presenters. These presentations were then uploaded to YouTube and can be viewed by the public. Starting in 2021, awardees now create project videos that are screened at Carnival and uploaded on YouTube.

== Workshops and resources ==
In 2003 Creative Capital started producing workshops, offering all artists access to online and in-person workshops to help them with skills such as communication and marketing, strategic planning, self-management, fundraising, and community building. Many of the programs are developed and led by Creative Capital Awardees, using the affordable workshop model to give them a platform to share their expertise. The workshops have been described as a "crash course in self-management, strategic planning, fundraising and promotion".

During the pandemic in 2020, Creative Capital provided online resources including free artist workshops. The organization was also a member of Artist Relief, an emergency coalition of national arts grantmakers to support artists during the COVID-19 crisis.
