= Singapore International Photography Festival =

The Singapore International Photography Festival (SIPF) is a non-profit biennial festival organised by Singapore-based independent art space, DECK. Its first edition, held in October 2008, was the first event of its kind in Southeast Asia, with its programmes emphasising new photography in Southeast Asia and showcasing photographic works from Artists from the region alongside international peers at various venues across Singapore.

The three main festival components are the Ooficial exhibitions, workshops and portfolio review session for selected Southeast Asian photographers. Alongside, SIPF fringe activities are carried out at various arts galleries, arts spaces and education institutions to promote photography across Singapore. In 2012, SIPF has expanded its education programme with "Magnum Mentorship Singapore" a partnership with Magnum Photos Agency, and "Conversation with Black Box" a series of visual literacy activities for school students.

== Festival Curators ==
In each festival edition, SIPF invites arts professionals from all around the world to take part in the festival as Curators and portfolio reviewers. The selection of the Open Call submissions for the festival exhibitions are decided by the curators, independently of the festival organisers.

=== 2014 ===
- Dr Adele Tan (Singapore)
- Alexander Supartono (Indonesia)
- Dr Charles Merewether (Australia/Singapore)
- Tay Kay Chin (Singapore)

=== 2012 ===
- Alejandro Castellote (Spain)
- Patricia Levasseur de la Motte (France/Singapore)
- Zeng Han (China)

=== 2010 ===
- Ark Fongsmut (Thailand)
- Bridget Tracy Tan (Thailand)
- Chow Chee Yong (Singapore)
- Yasufumi Nakamori (Japan/USA)

=== 2008 ===
- Ark Fongsmut (Thailand)
- Chow Chee Yong (Singapore)
- Terence Yeung (Singapore)
- Wang Xi (China)

== Official exhibitions ==
There are two types of official exhibitions: The Open Call Showcase and the Special Showcase. The Open Call Showcase focusses on photographic works selected from international submissions. The invited curators of the festival will meet in Singapore to make the selection, and to discuss on the curation of the works across various public venues in Singapore. Special Showcase are by invitation and often related to the core public programme in the festival. The duration of the exhibition ranges from 3 weeks to 3 months depending on the venues partners in each edition of the festival.

=== SIPF Open Call Showcase ===
In its 3rd SIPF Open Call, the exhibitions presented works by 50 emerging and established photographers from 25 countries such as Cambodia, Spain, Mexico, Peru, and Thailand.

==== 2012 Showcased Photographers ====
Photographer	Series
Alina Kisina	City of Home
Anida Yoeu Ali	Buddhist Bug Project
Arturo Betancourt	Theatre Of Silence
Bronek Kozka	Suburban Memories
Carlo Bevilacqua	Into The Silence, Hermits of the Third Millennium
Christian Lutz	Tropical Gift, Oil And Gas in Nigeria
Cyrus Cornut	Travelling to the Outskirts
Dale Yudelman	Life Under Democracy
Ellie Davies	Come With Me
Fernando Montiel Klint	Acts Of Faith
Filippo Minelli	Silence/Shapes
Flore-Aël Surun	Some Desire in the Wings
Graeme Williams	Painting Over The Present
Hirohito Nomoto	Façade
Htet T San	Emotion/Untold Stories
Hu Qiren	Mian Xiang: The Art Of Traditional Chinese Face-Reading
Ian Teh	Traces
Jake Verzosa	The Last Tattooed Women Of Kalinga
Ji Hyun Kwon	The Guilty
Joel Yuen	If There Is Something Strange About Me, I Am Not Aware Of It
Justin Maxon	Slow Down… Breathe… Only This Life
Kee Ya Ting	Inquisitive Investigations
Kerry Skarbakka	The Struggle To Right Oneself
Kim Hak	After 12
Laura Stevens	Us Alone
Lee Puay Yang Sean	I Believe in the Therapy Of Silliness
Lola Guerrera	Delights in My Garden
Lucía Herrero	Tribes
Manuel Vazquez	Theatrum Mundi
Marlous Van Der Sloot	De Slapende Arm (The Sleeping Arm)
Melissa Moore	Land Ends
Miti Ruangkritya	Imagining Flood
Musuk Nolte Maldonado	Shawi: Mystery With A Name Of Its Own
Nge Lay	The Relevancy Of Restricted Things
Norihisa Hosaka	Burning Chrome
Olivia Marty	Recollection
Patty Carroll	Anonymous Women: Draped
Reginald Van De Velde	Tomorrow Never Knows
Shen Chao-Liang	Stage
Shen Linghao	Poetic Melancholy
Shen Wei	Chinese Sentiment
Tran Viet Van	Breath
Tristan Cai	Tales of the Moving Mountains: Why Won’t God Go Away?
Wawi Navarroza	Dominion
Willis Turner Henry	Cina Medan = Medanese Chinese
Wu Cheng Chang	Vision Of Taiwan
Zakaria Zainal	Singaplural
Zhang Xiao	They
Zhou Wei	Picturesque Scenery
