= Heather Dewey-Hagborg =

American forensic artist

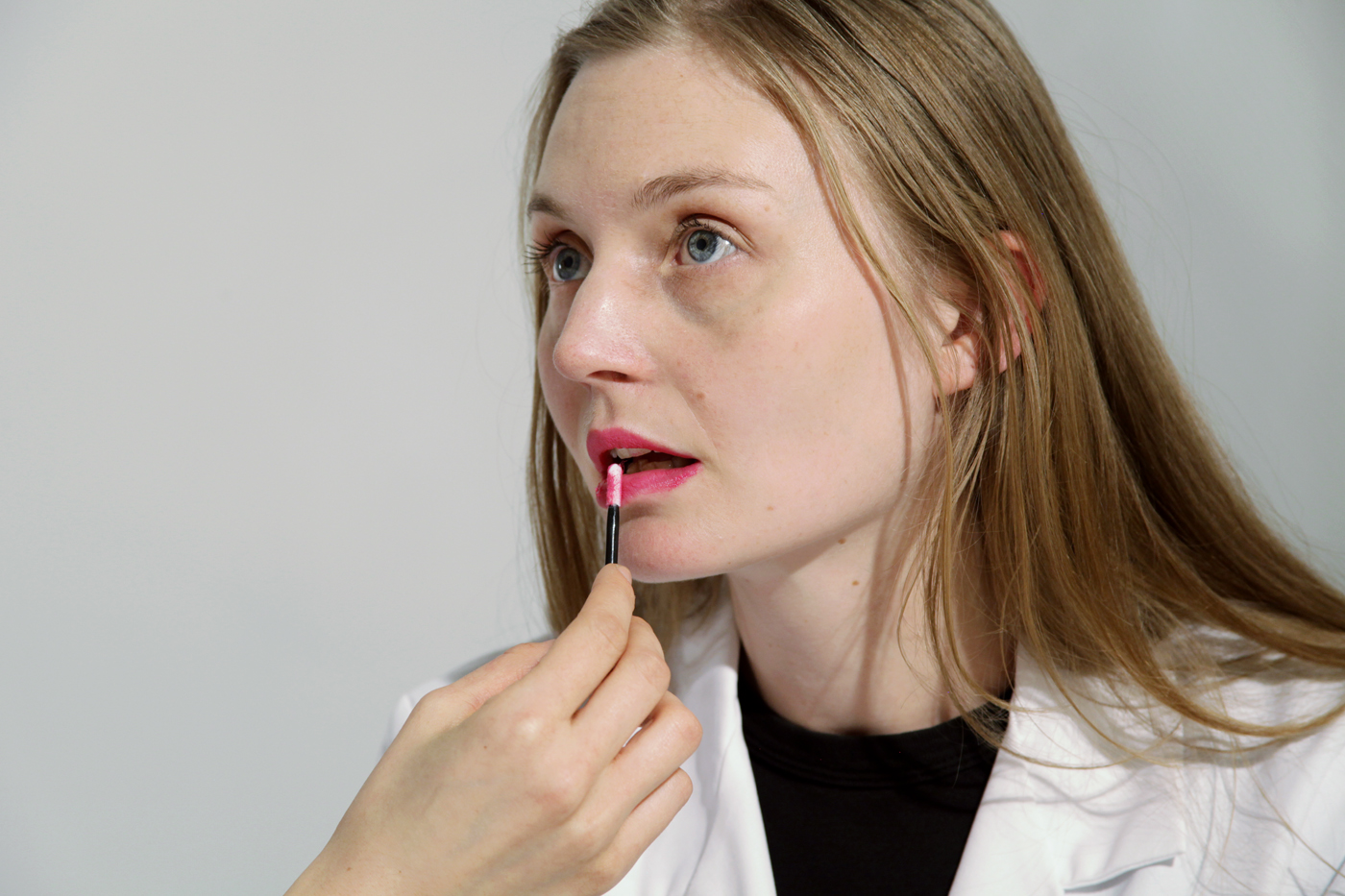
- Heather Dewey-Hagborg (photo from her 2013 project DNA Spoofing)
- Born: June 4, 1982 (age 44); Philadelphia, Pennsylvania, U.S.
- Education: Bennington College, New York University, Rensselaer Polytechnic Institute
- Occupation: Information artist
- Notable work: Stranger Visions
- Heather Dewey-Hagborg's voice Recorded in August 2014
- Website: http://deweyhagborg.com

Heather Dewey-Hagborg (born June 4, 1982, Philadelphia, Pennsylvania) is an information artist and bio-hacker. She is best known for her project Stranger Visions, a series of portraits created from DNA she recovered from discarded items, such as hair, cigarettes and chewing gum while living in Brooklyn, New York. From the extracted DNA, she determined gender, ethnicity and other factors and then used face-generating software and a 3D printer to create a speculative, algorithmically determined 3D portrait. While critical of technology and surveillance, her work has also been noted as provocative in its lack of legal precedent.

== Education ==
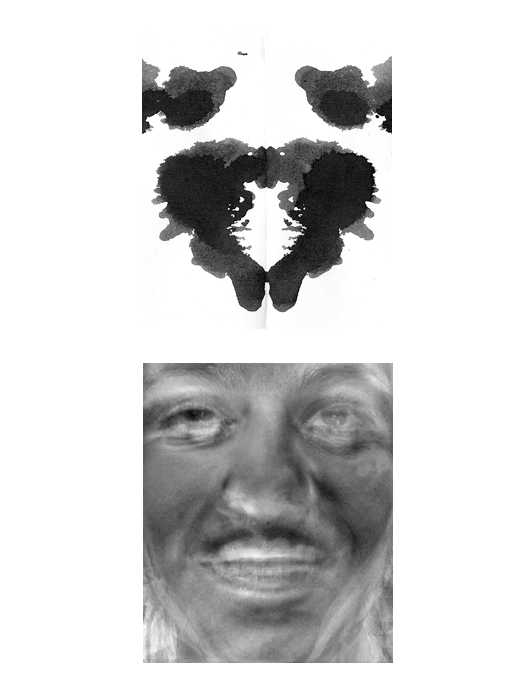
Spurious Memories (2007)

Dr. Dewey-Hagborg is an information and bio artist whose works explore the intersection between art and science. As a student in the Information Arts program at Bennington College, she participated in computer science classes, which laid the groundwork for the science-based artwork she would later envision using algorithms, electronics, and computer programming. She earned a Bachelor of Arts (B.A.) degree in 2003.

Dewey-Hagborg continued refining her work as an artist and computer programmer, studying artificial intelligence, while obtaining a Master of Professional Studies (M.P.S.) in Interactive Telecommunications from New York University (NYU) in 2007. It was here she curated a robotic performance art show called Robots on the March! in March 2005, and exhibited a piece called Lighter than Air: an experiment in constructing an autonomous flying robot.

As a final project at NYU, Dewey-Hagborg explored the question "Can computers be creative?" in an exhibit she called Spurious Memories. She developed an autonomous face categorizing and generating software program which recognized facial components, made comparisons and adjustments, and produced unique representations of the human face through mass exposure to facial images. Dewey-Hagborg continued her education at Rensselaer Polytechnic Institute and graduated with a PhD in Electronic Arts in 2016.

As an educator her areas of interest include art and technology, multimedia, digital photography, research-based art and programming, and computer science. Dewey-Hagborg worked as a teaching assistant at Rensselaer Polytechnic Institute, an adjunct professor at NYU's Interactive Telecommunications Program, an adjunct professor at NYU's Courant Institute of Mathematical Sciences, and taught art and technology studies at the School of the Art Institute of Chicago.

As of August 2019, Dewey-Hagborg lives and works in Abu Dhabi, and is a Visiting Assistant Professor of Interactive Media at NYU Abu Dhabi. Her courses include Communication and Technology, and Understanding Interactive Media, and Bioart Practices.

== Projects ==
=== Totem ===
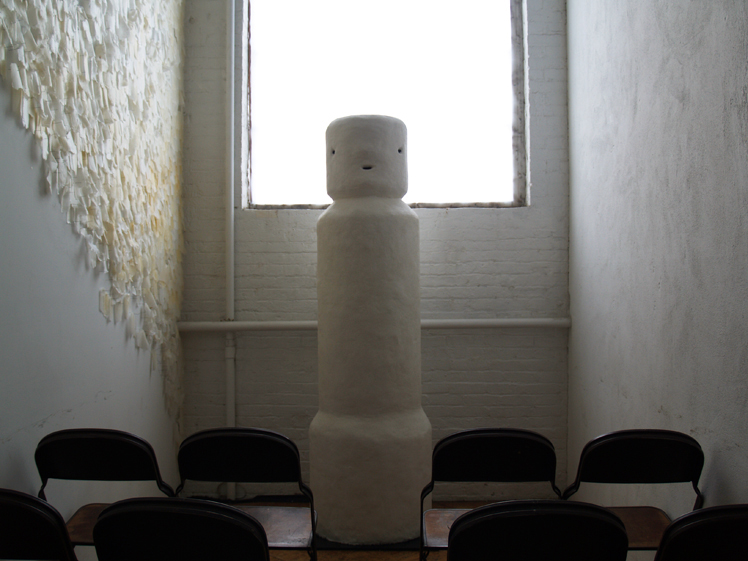
Totem (2010)

Dewey-Hagborg's Totem (2010) was a site-specific multimedia sculpture characterizing her earlier work. Totem, an idol, was designed to explore the implications of language and artificial intelligence using machine learning technology. Exploiting audio surveillance techniques to eavesdrop on and record conversations at the installation site, Dewey-Hagborg wrote algorithms to then isolate word sequences and grammatical structures into commonly used units. Influenced by Hebbian theory, she programmed the sculpture's computer to generate speech based on the most frequently occurring language structures in any given recording period. Over time, the least frequently elicited words or units would fade or be dropped from the sculpture's spoken vocabulary. The remaining units, stored in the sculpture's memory, were then spoken at random intervals.

Martha Schwendener, of The New York Times, wrote that Totem showed promise, but, because of audio difficulties and its fragmented, randomly generated speech, the piece "failed to connect human speech, meaning, and technology in a profound fashion."

=== Stranger Visions ===
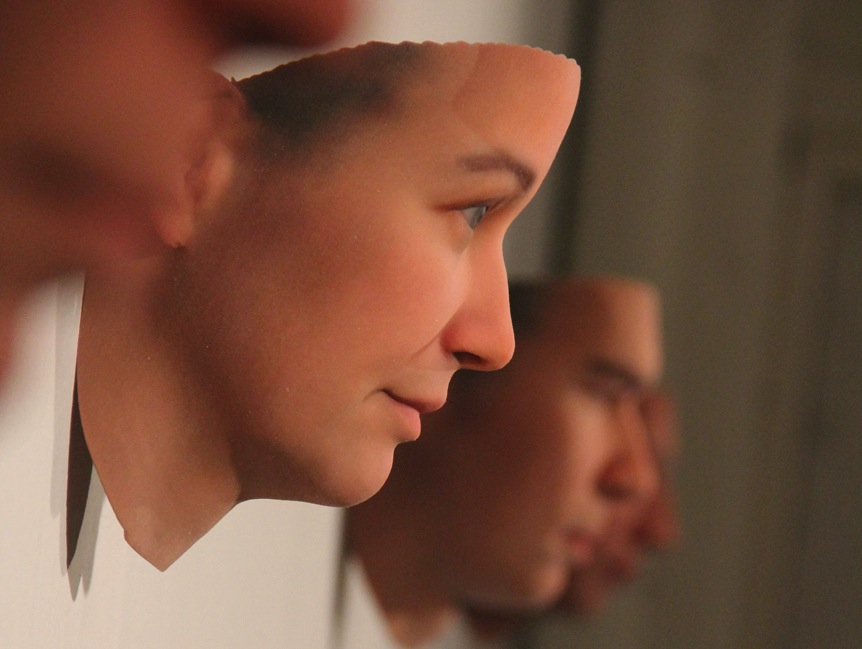
Stranger Visions Portraits (2012)

Stranger Visions (2012–2013) is a science-based, artistic exploration using DNA as a starting point for lifelike, computer generated 3D portraits.

She began this project questioning how much information could be understood about a person using genetic detritus left behind by strangers in New York City. "I was really struck by this idea that the very things that make us human – hair, skin, saliva, and fingernails – become a real liability for us as we constantly shed them in public. Anyone could come along and mine them for information." She hoped, by producing realistic sculptures of anonymous people using clues from their DNA, to spark a debate about the potential use or misuse of DNA profiling, privacy, and genetic surveillance.

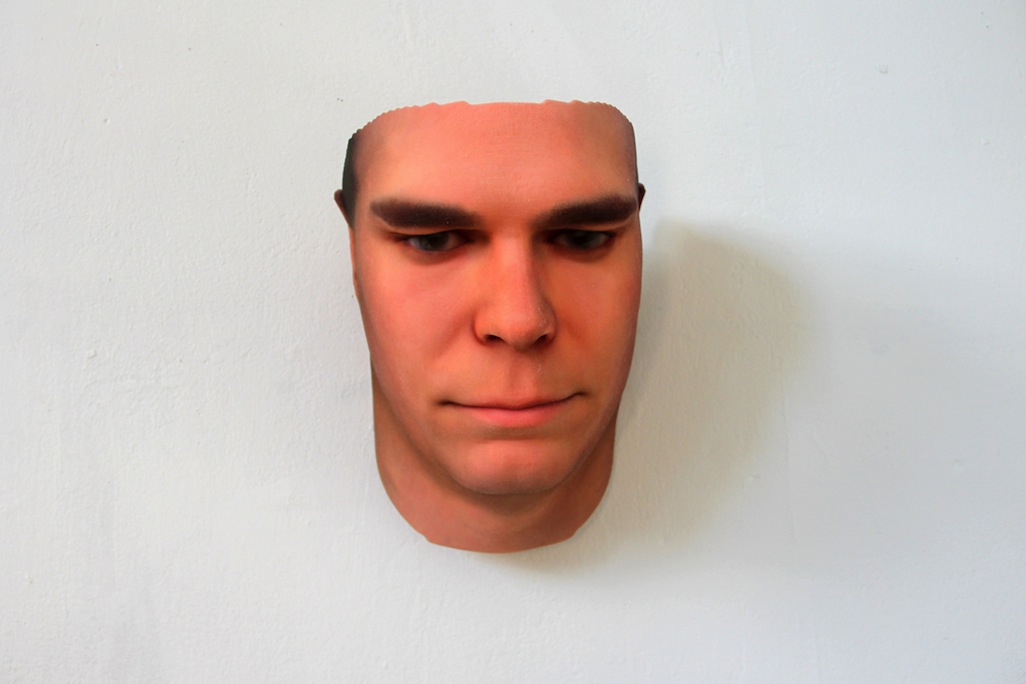
Stranger Visions portrait "Sample 2" based on the DNA sample from a cigarette butt collected on Myrtle Avenue in New York City, N.Y.

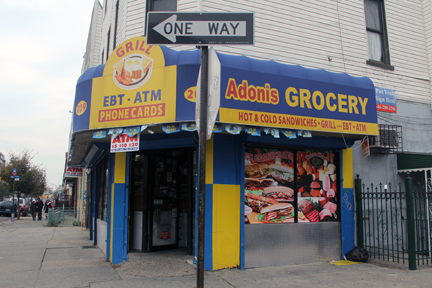
Collection site for DNA Samples; Corner of Wilson Avenue and Stanhope Street in Bushwick, Brooklyn, New York.

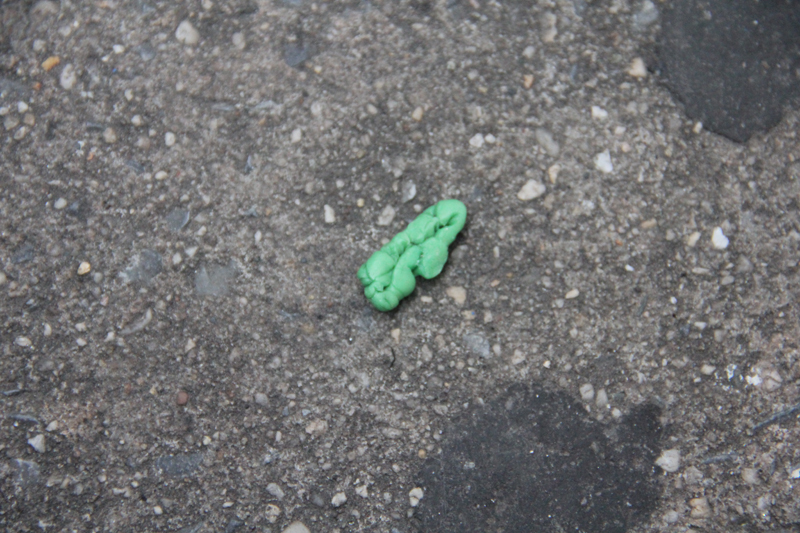
Gum collected, that upon analysis revealed the genetic traits of a male of Native American and South American descent with brown eyes.

As part of her research for Stranger Visions, she took a three-week crash-course in biotechnology at the Genspace laboratory in New York where she learned about the significant amount of personal information that an amateur biologist could learn about someone through biotech processes.

She began the process of extracting DNA from the samples she collected. The extraction involves treating a hair sample, for example, with a gel that dissolves the hair, and a primer specifically developed to help locate characteristics like eye color or gender along the genome. She might repeat this process up to 40 times, looking for genetic variants influencing traits like eye color, hair color, and racial ancestry, in order to complete a portrait.

Once the DNA strands are extracted from the samples, she then amplifies, or copies, specific regions of the genome, using a technique called Polymerase Chain Reaction, or PCR, a process advanced by Kary Mullis, a winner of the Nobel Prize in Chemistry (1993). These amplified regions of the genome make it possible to identifying single nucleotide polymorphisms, or SNPs (pronounced "snips"), which contain variables in the base pairs that give clues to a person's individual genetic make up (e.g., whether or not a person's eyes might be blue, brown or green). These results are then sent for analysis to a company for sequencing. She used 23andMe, a DNA analysis service, for Stranger Visions.

Illustration of Single Nucleotide Polymorphisms (SNPs)

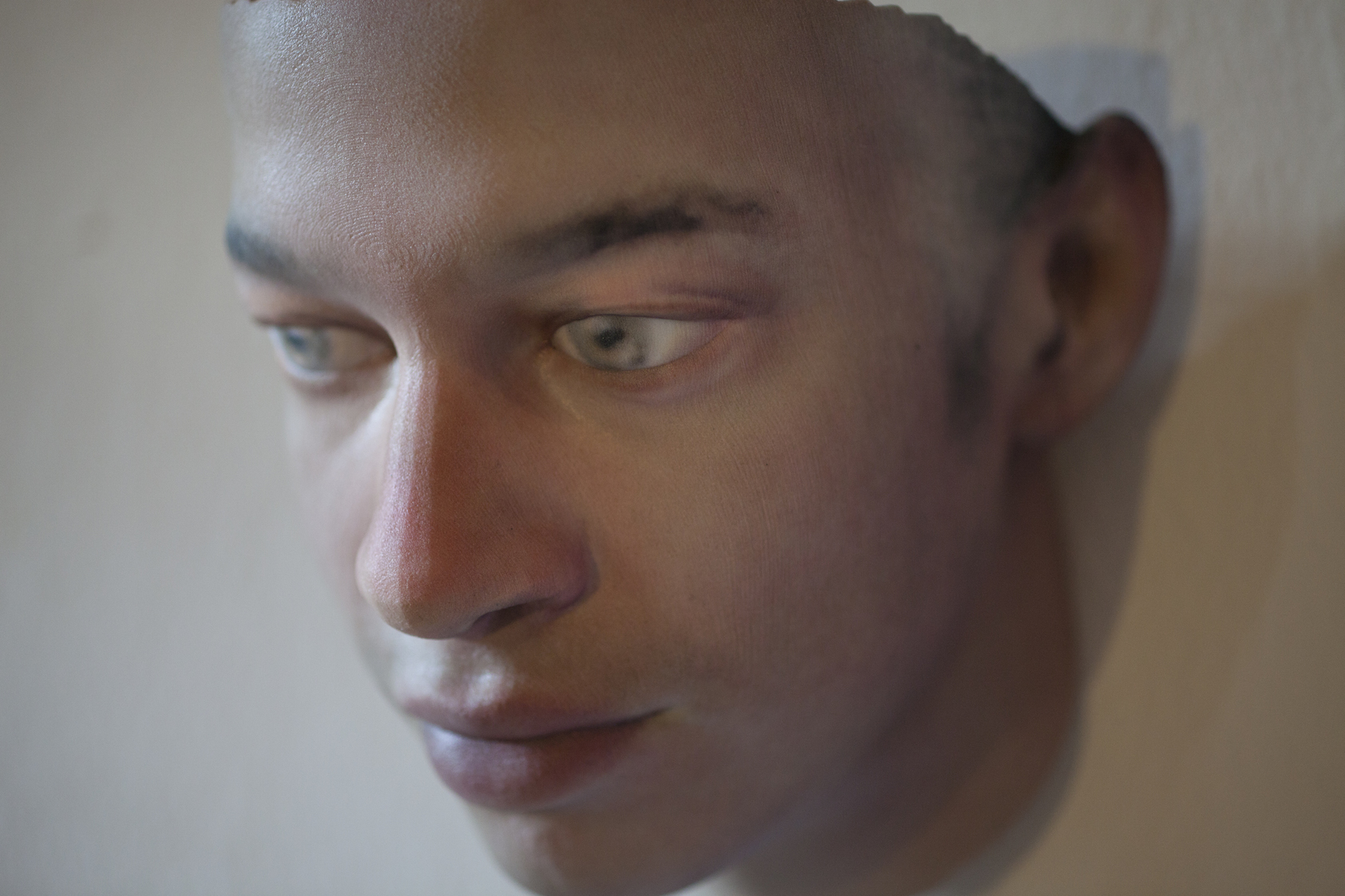
Stranger Visions portrait "Sample 3"

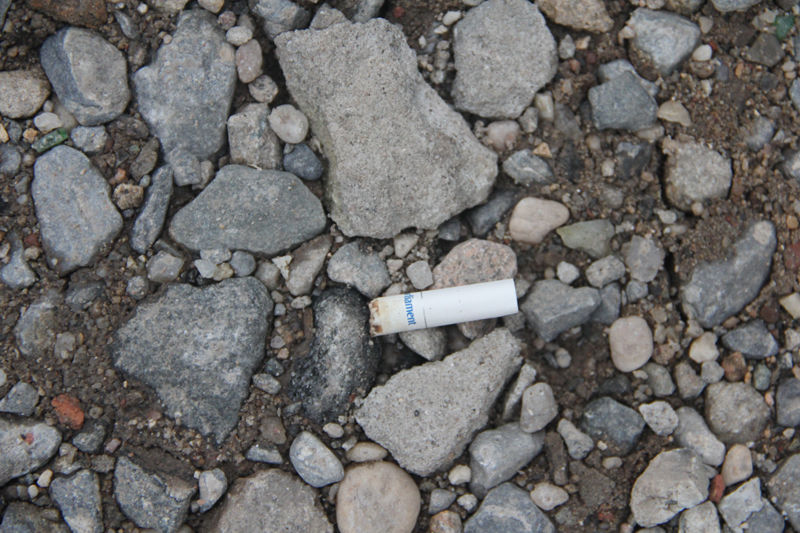
Sample collected for Stranger Visions on Myrtle Avenue, Brooklyn, New York.

The genetic blueprint she receives in return is a text file full of coded information identifying the unique positioning of the 4 nucleobases adenine, thymine, cytosine, and guanine, or ATC and G, that make up the sections of the genome she is interested in. This data is then entered into a customized computer program she wrote. The program interprets the code and provides her with a list of traits, including propensity for obesity, eye color, hair color, hair curl, skin tone, freckles, and gender. She then takes these traits, as many as 50, and enters them into a face-generating program to configure the 3-D portraits. Her previous experience with facial recognition algorithms gave her the ability to repurpose an existing facial recognition program, from Basel, Switzerland. She reworked the program to generate faces instead of just recognizing facial features. The resulting model changes facial dimensions (e.g., width of the nose and mouth) and characteristics with the genetic information it receives. Before making the final 3-D print, She generates several different versions of the face, finally choosing the one she finds most aesthetically pleasing.

Critics of Dewey-Hagborg's Stranger Visions question whether or not the work crosses ethical and legal boundaries. They make a distinction between an artist's right to express societal concerns through artwork and the act of collecting personal, genetic information without informed consent. The fact that DNA samples are regularly "left behind" or abandoned does not mean those people have relinquished their right to decide how that information is used.

Some laws, like that of the Human Tissue Act of 2004 in the United Kingdom, prohibit private individuals from collecting biological samples for DNA analysis. What laws that exist to regulate the collection and use of DNA samples in the United States are not consistent among the states and rarely address the private sector. Only some states, like New York, outlaw most DNA testing without written consent. Others worry about the misuse of the information, fearing discrimination based on existing medical or mental health issues or a predisposition for disease-related illnesses or "unreasonable" searches of DNA evidence by law enforcement. One scientist and one gallery, according to Dewey-Hagborg, turned down her proposal fearing the project would "cause a fright" among people.

Other critics focus on the growing do-it-yourself or biohacking movement. Supporters like Genspace's Ellen Jorgensen claim projects like Stranger Visions engage the public and make the new technology more accessible. Detractors fear unintended or unexpected consequences from unregulated experiments conducted by D.I.Y. amateur biologists developed in non-traditional laboratory settings.

Still others, including Daniel MacArthur, an assistant professor at Harvard Medical School, John D. Hawks, an anthropologist at the University of Wisconsin-Madison, Michelle N. Meyer, an academic fellow at the Petrie-Flom Center for Health Law Policy, Biotechnology & Bioethics at Harvard Medical School, and Arthur Caplan, PhD, Director of the Division of Medical Ethics, N.Y.U., report that the technological capability to construct an accurate likeness of a human face based on DNA evidence is not currently available.

Although it is possible to identify certain genetic markers linked to facial structures, scientists have yet to isolate all the genes and their variations needed to produce an accurate likeness with a computer simulation. Meyer, who analyzed the data from Dewey-Hagborg's website concludes:

So far as I can tell, she's working with sex; ancestral groups that are usually very broad, and in any event only reflects half of the individual's DNA (from which she presumably guesses hair color and texture and bone structure); and a decent guess at eye color. There are hundreds of thousands (at least) of people who would fit these descriptions even if each of her phenotype predictions were accurate, and in many cases, one or more of the predictions are probably going to be wrong.

The environment, the probabilistic nature of interpreting the DNA data collected, and limitations of computer technology all influence the outcome. She likens her work to that of a sketch artist. At most, her portraits bear only a vague, family resemblance to the people whose genetic information was used as a foundation for the portraits.

Stranger Visions was on view in the exhibition Mutations-Créations / Imprimer le Monde and is in the permanent collection of Centre Pompidou in Paris, France. A public version of the genetic profiling code is available on GitHub.

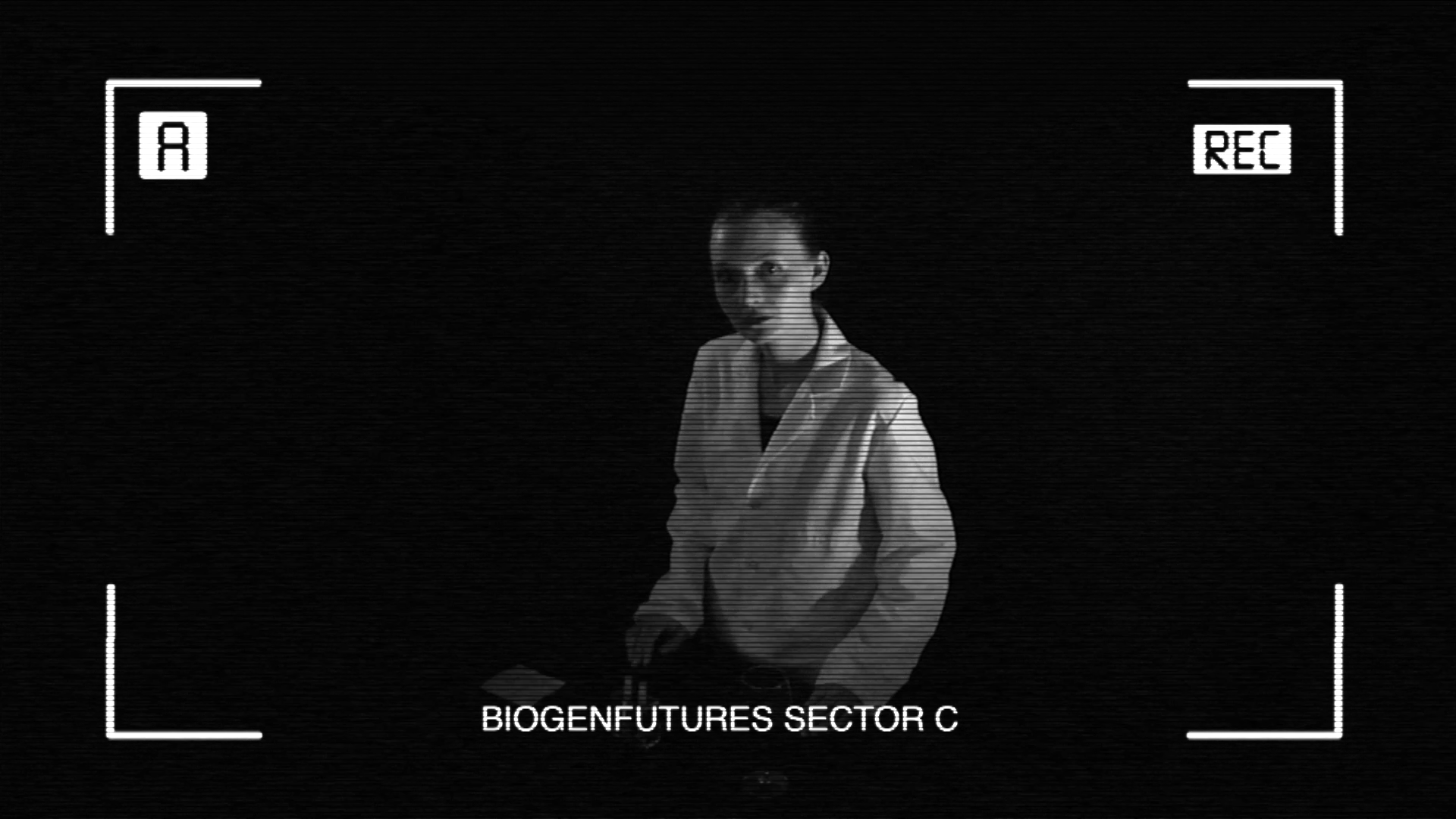
Invisible (2014)

In 2013, Dewey-Hagborg was contacted by an assistant medical examiner in Delaware, as a result of her work with Stranger Visions. The project involved developing a portrait of an unidentified woman whose case has remained unsolved for 20 years. She agreed to be an adviser to assist with the case. Though the resulting portrait based on the unidentified woman's DNA could only be as accurate as existing technology allowed, leaving room for speculation, Dewey-Hagborg viewed working on the case as the only potential use for this type of face-generating technology. "If you can add anything at all to her description, if you can increase the possibility her loved ones may find her even one little bit I think it's worth it." Critics of Dewey-Hagborg's involvement in the Delaware case express concern for what they call "D.I.Y. forensic science" and question the role of civilians in state investigations.

=== Invisible ===
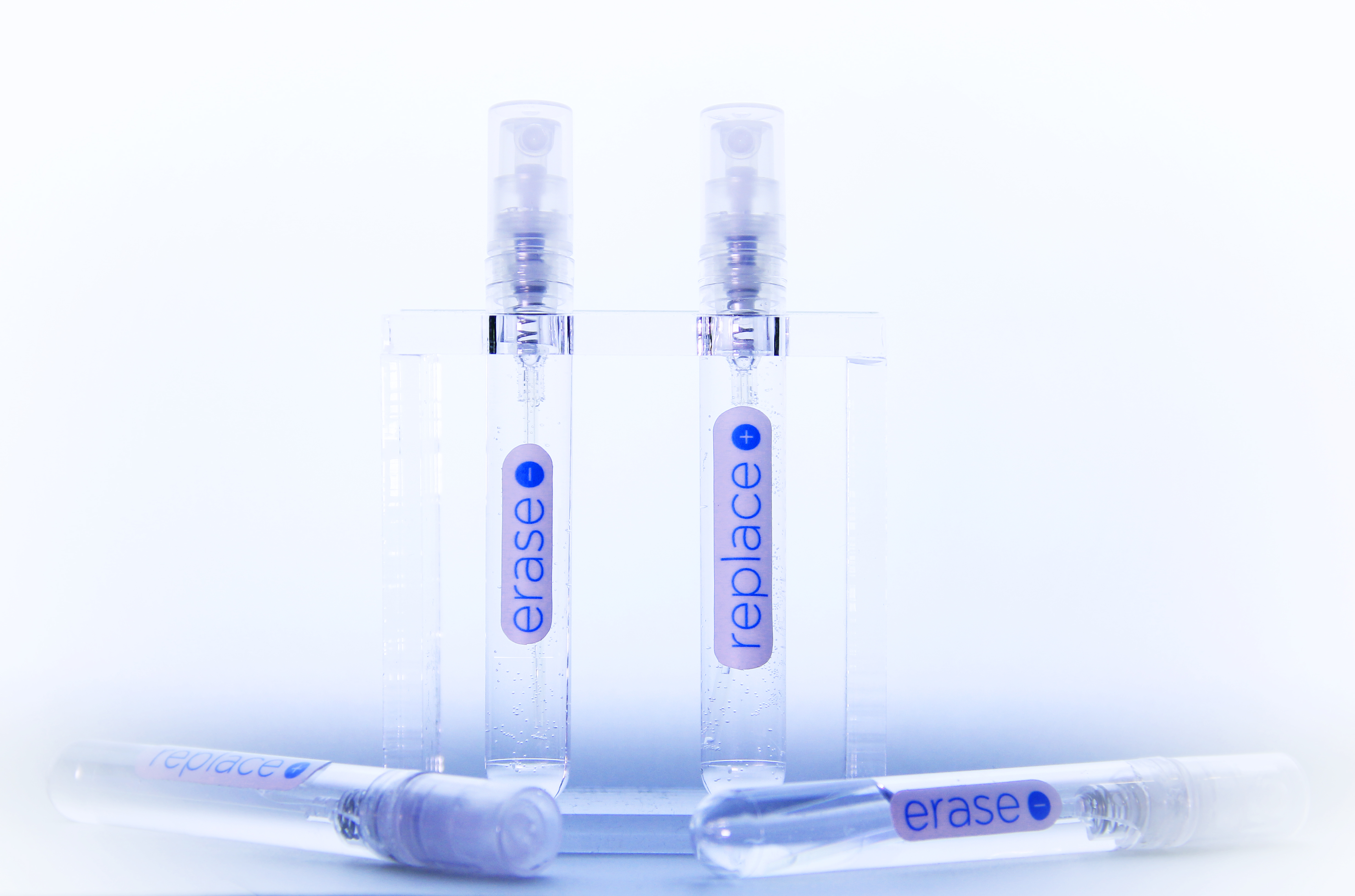
Invisible (2014)

Dewey-Hagborg's work with Stranger Visions and interest in issues surrounding genetic surveillance lead to the development of two products whose purpose is to eliminate DNA traces. The first, Erase, is a bleaching spray that cleans surfaces (e.g., cups, silverware) of DNA evidence. The second, Replace, is a spray consisting of a blend of genes designed to introduce foreign DNA evidence to the surface, therefore masking any of the original DNA remaining in that area. Dewey-Hagborg views these as a "citizens' defense against the looming DNA surveillance state."

=== Collaboration with Chelsea Manning ===
In the summer of 2017 Dewey-Hagborg's collaborative exhibition with transgender activist Chelsea E. Manning A Becoming Resemblance opened at Fridman Gallery in New York City, curated by Roddy Schrock. For the exhibition, Dewey-Hagborg created 3D printed portraits of Manning, based on cheek swabs and hair clippings that Manning sent her while incarcerated for leaking classified information to WikiLeaks. Dewey-Hagborg created Probably Chelsea, 30 portraits based on Manning's maternal DNA, their variances in skin color and features presents the malleability of DNA data, and Radical Love, two portraits out of many that Manning selected because they best conveyed her appearance at the time of her gender transition within maximum security prison, which did not allow photography. The installation demonstrated how much the human genome is up for interpretation once condensed and subjectively interpreted." Probably Chelsea has since traveled to numerous institutions for exhibition, including Transmediale 2018: Face Value, January–April 2018 in Berlin, MU Art Space, Genomic Intimacy, May–July 2018 in Eindhoven, Netherlands and Perth Institute of Contemporary Art, Hyperprometheus, October–December, 2018.

Probably Chelsea is in the permanent museum collection of the Exploratorium in San Francisco, California. Radical Love is on view in the permanent collections of the New York Historical Society and the Victoria and Albert Museum in London.

=== Xeno in Vivo ===
Dewey-Hagborg's Xeno in Vivo (2024) was a live multimedia opera performance. Xeno in Vivo premiered at the Exploratorium in San Francisco on March 7 and 8, 2024. The opera delves into the topic of xenotransplantation, the transplantation of living cells, tissues, or organs from one species to another. It examines whether CRISPR gene editing is a radical new technology or merely an extension of the ancient Western practice of selective breeding. Along with audio and video media featuring laboratories of scientists and non-human animals, Dewey-Hagborg narrates the multimedia performance, recounting conversations she had with scientists about the ethical implications of xenotransplantation. The live production integrates projections, sculpture, and live beating heart cells on stage with four opera singers, accompanied by original music composed by Bethany Barrett.

== Additional exhibitions and events ==
Dewey-Hagborg's work has been exhibited at The Monitor Digital Festival in Guadalajara, Mexico, PS1 MoMA, Long Island City, New York, the New York Public Library in New York City, the Science Gallery at Trinity College Dublin, Ireland, the UTS Gallery in Sydney, Australia, Wei-Ling Gallery in Kuala Lumpur, Malaysia, the Jaaga Art and Technology Center in Bangalore, India, the Museum Boijmans in Rotterdam, Netherlands, and the Ars Electronica Center in Linz, Austria.

Dewey-Hagborg has also produced the following selected works:

- Trace Recordings: Surveillance and Identity in the 21st Century at the UTS Gallery, Ultimo NSW, Australia
- Cyber In Securities, Pepco Edison Place Gallery, Washington, D.C.
- Plugged In: Interactive Art in Electronic Media, Grounds for Sculpture, Domestic Arts Building, Hamilton Township, Mercer County, New Jersey.
- DNA and Dust (with Paul Hazelton), QF Gallery, East Hampton, New York.
- Unlanguage (with Adriana Varella), computer interactive installation, the Poland Mediations Bienniale, Zamek Castle, Poland.
- Open Circuit, PS1 MoMA, Long Island City, New York.
- Jaaga Dhvani, sound art, Bangalore, India

== Selected grants and awards ==
- 2008 Artist's Residency and Grant, Sculpture Space, Utica, New York.
- 2012 Residency at Eyebeam
- 2012 Artist's Residency and Jerome Foundation Grant, Clocktower Gallery, Manhattan, N.Y.
- 2013 VIDA 15.0 Art and Artificial Life International Awards, special mention
- 2016 Creative Capital Award
- 2019 New Technology Art Award, "Probably Chelsea", Zebrastraat Ghent, Belgium.

== Gallery ==
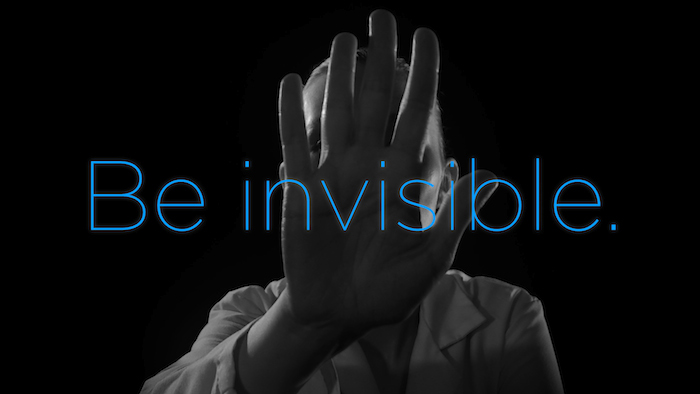
Invisible (2014)

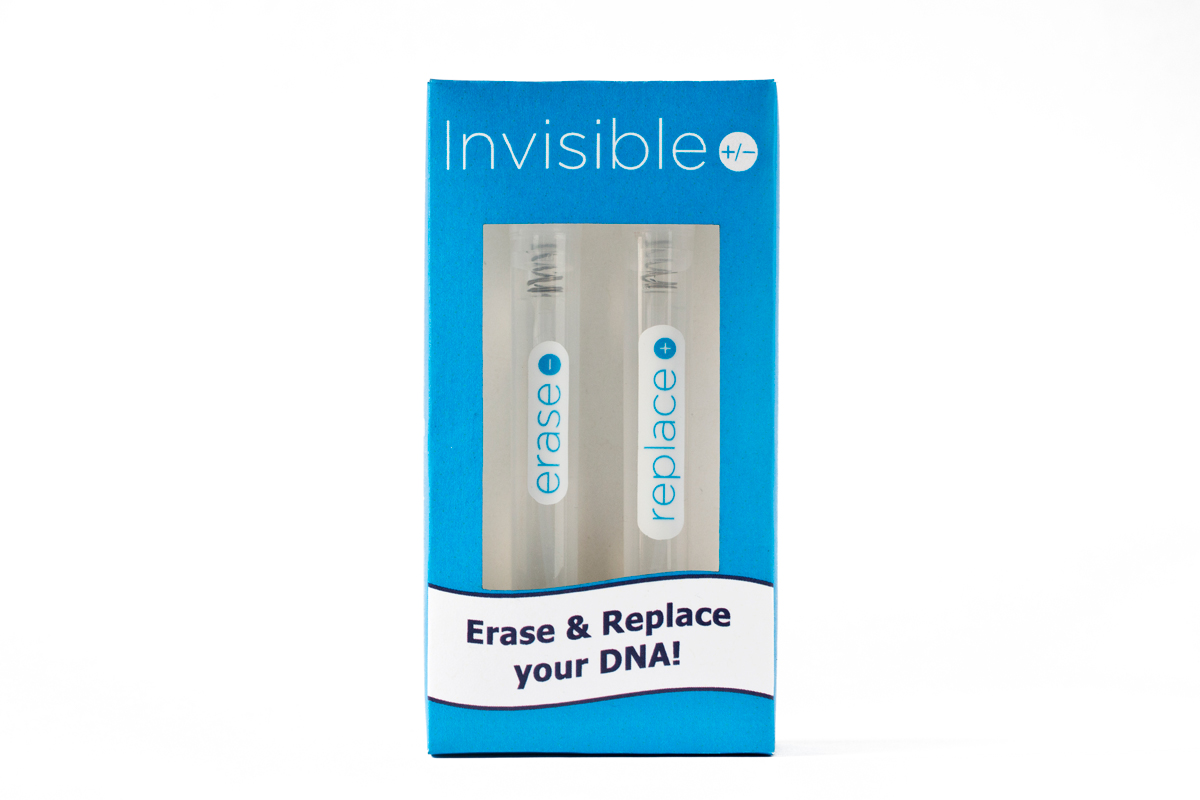
Invisible (2014)

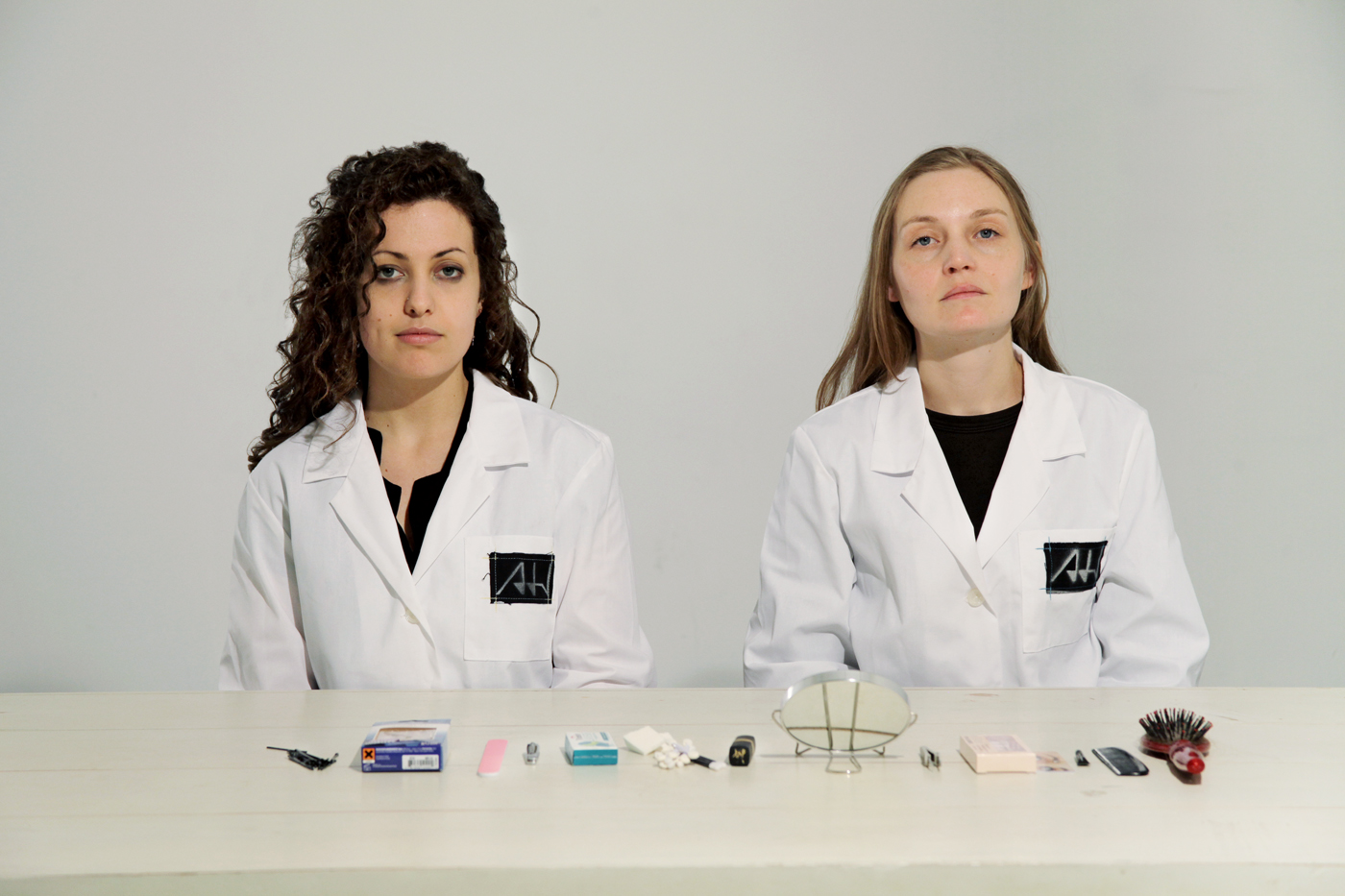
DNA Spoofing with Aurelia Moser (2013)

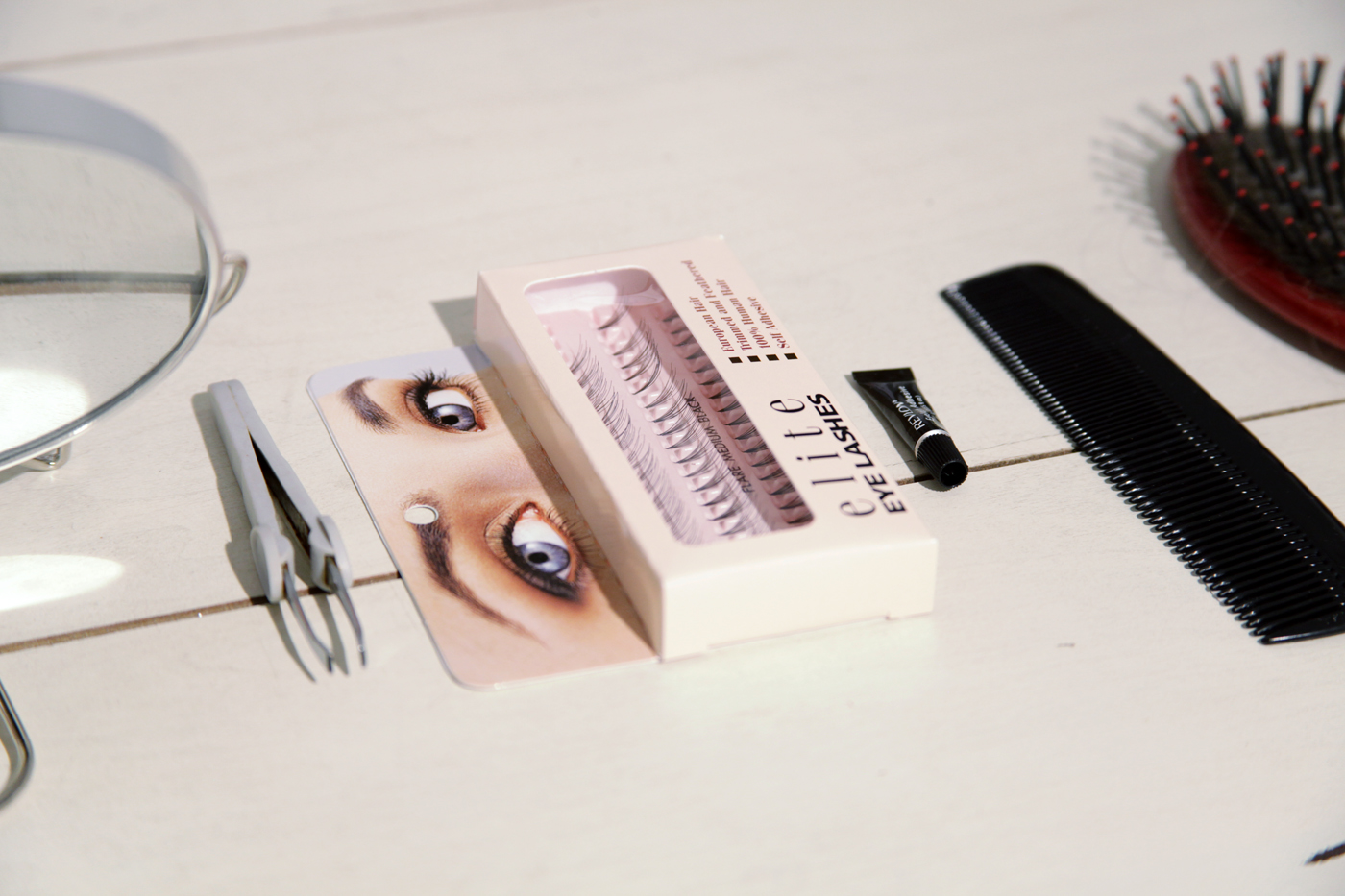
DNA Spoofing (2013)

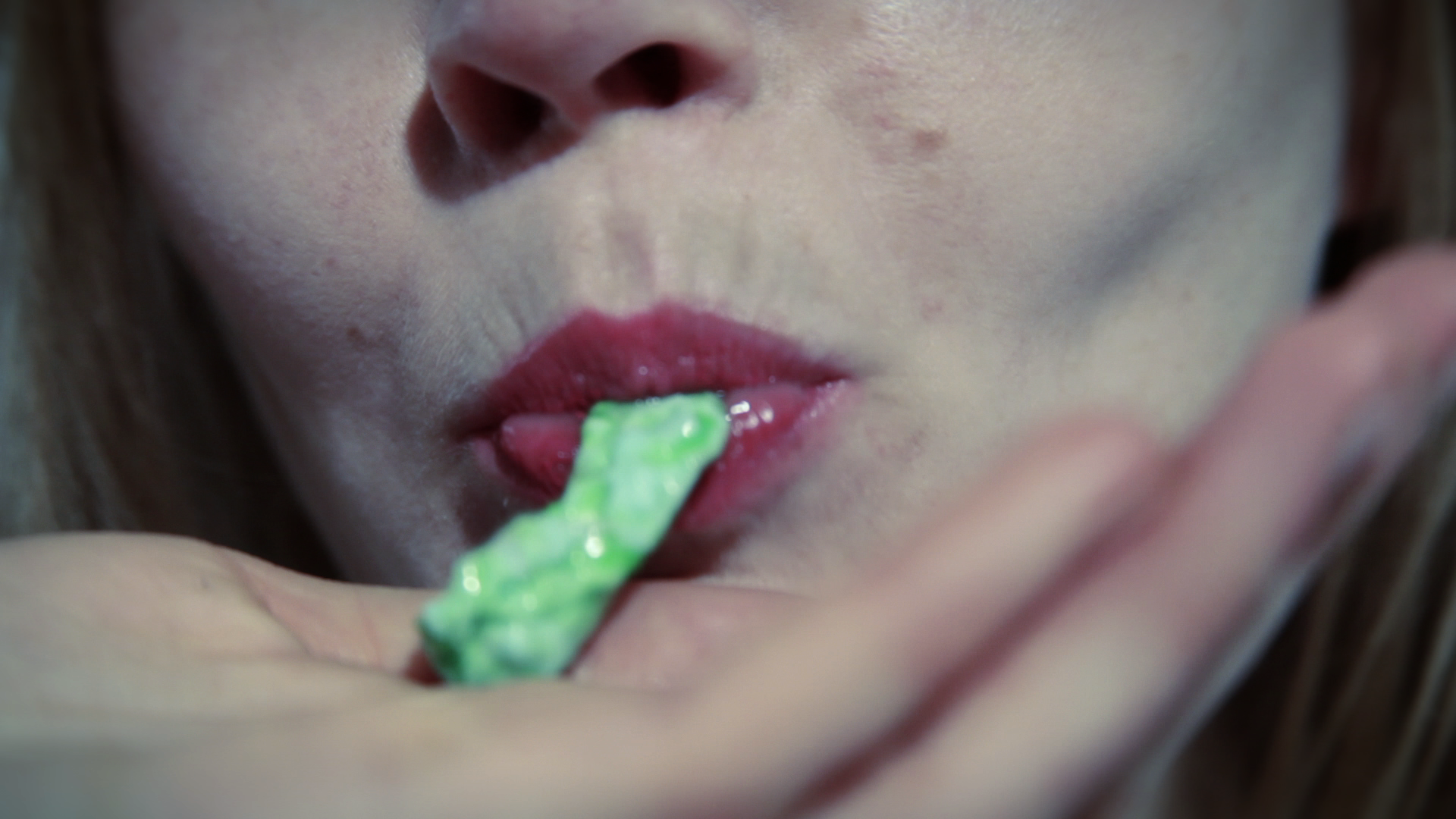
DNA Spoofing (2013)

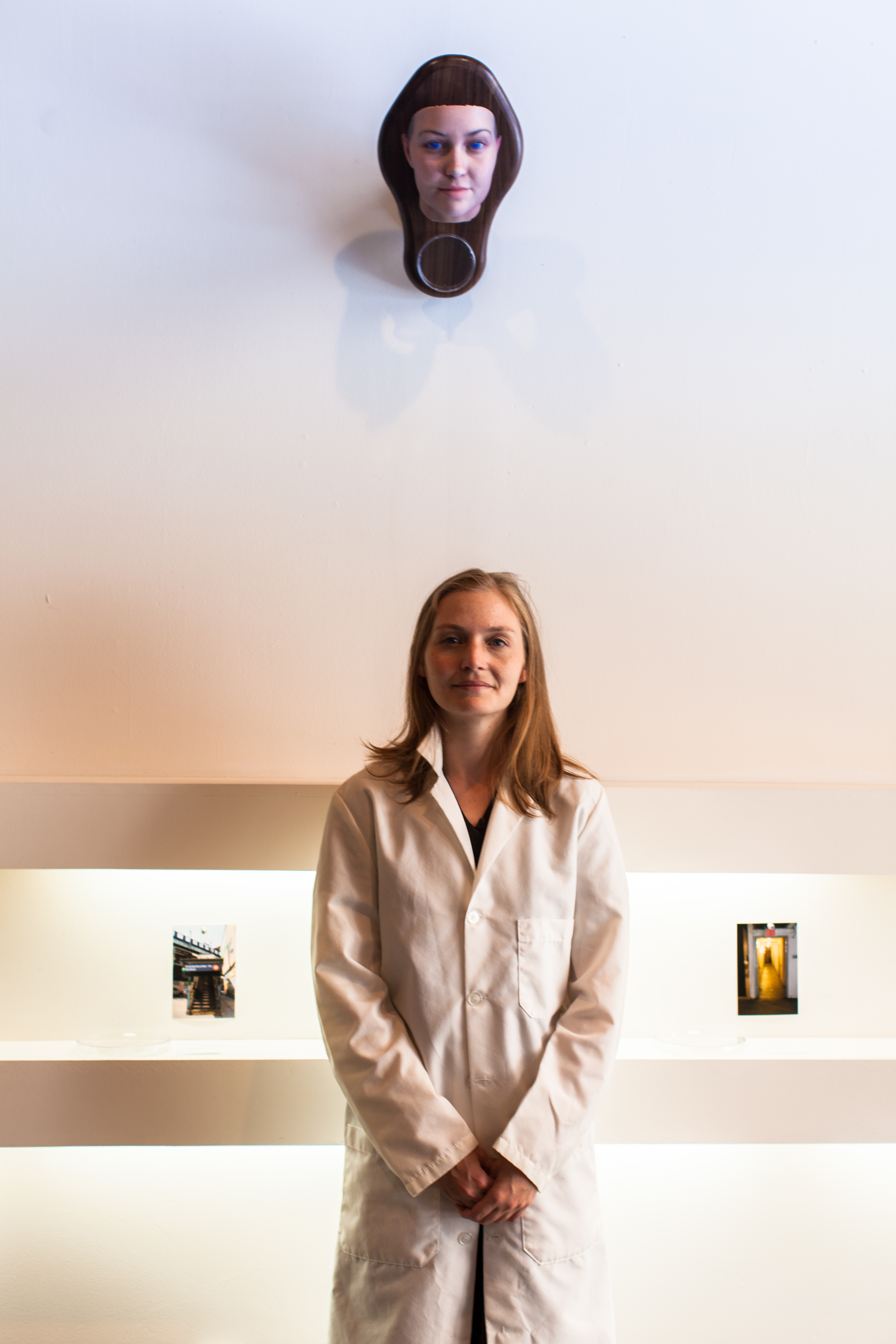
Stranger Visions (2012)

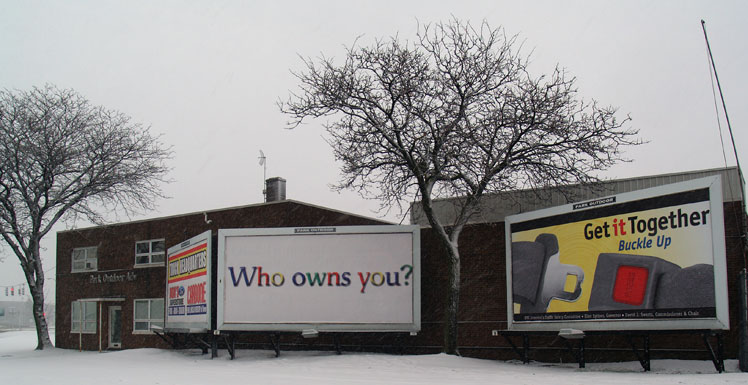
Who Owns You (2011)

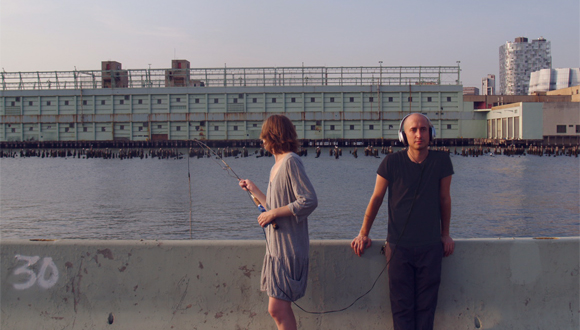
Hydrophony (2011)

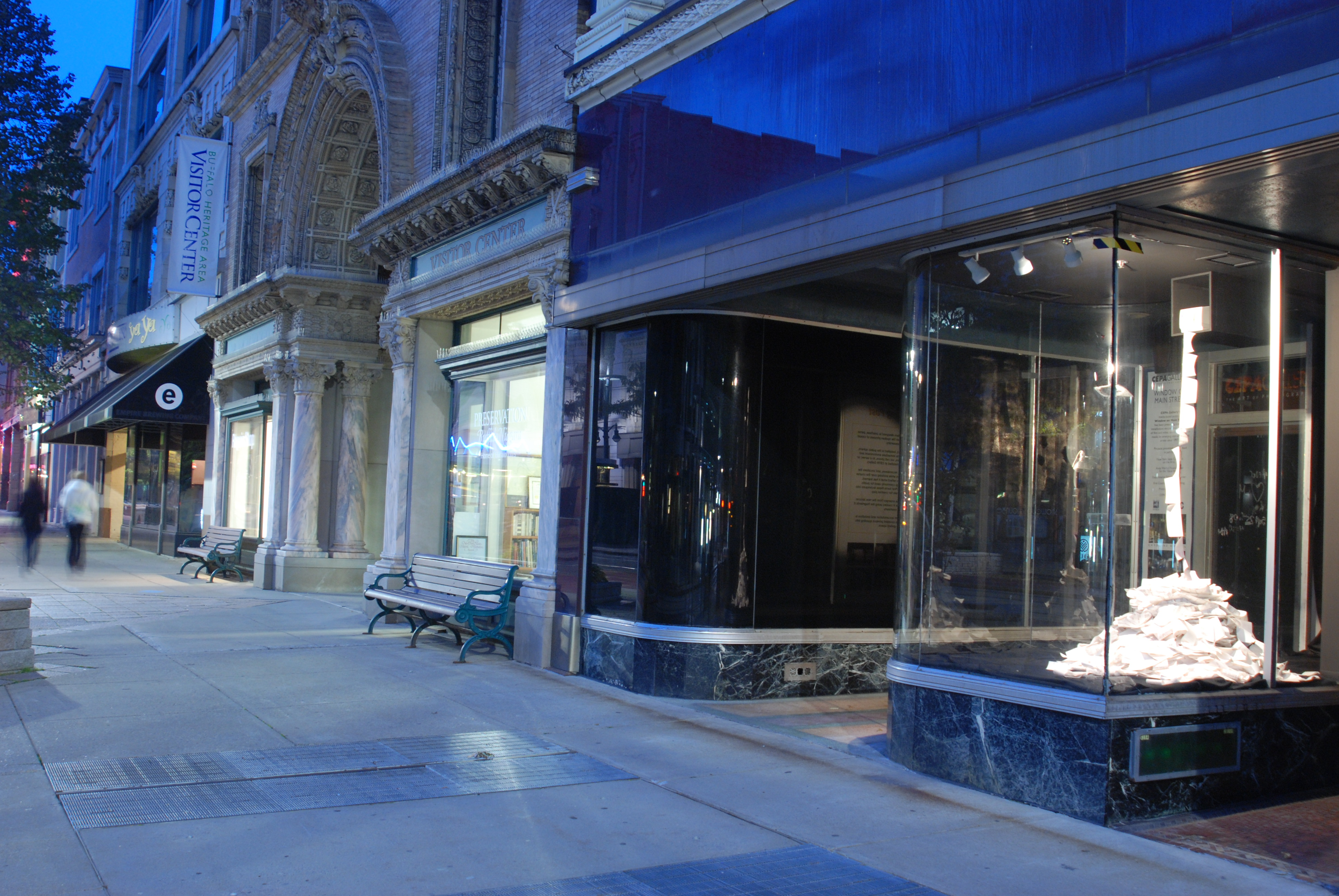
Listening Post (2009)

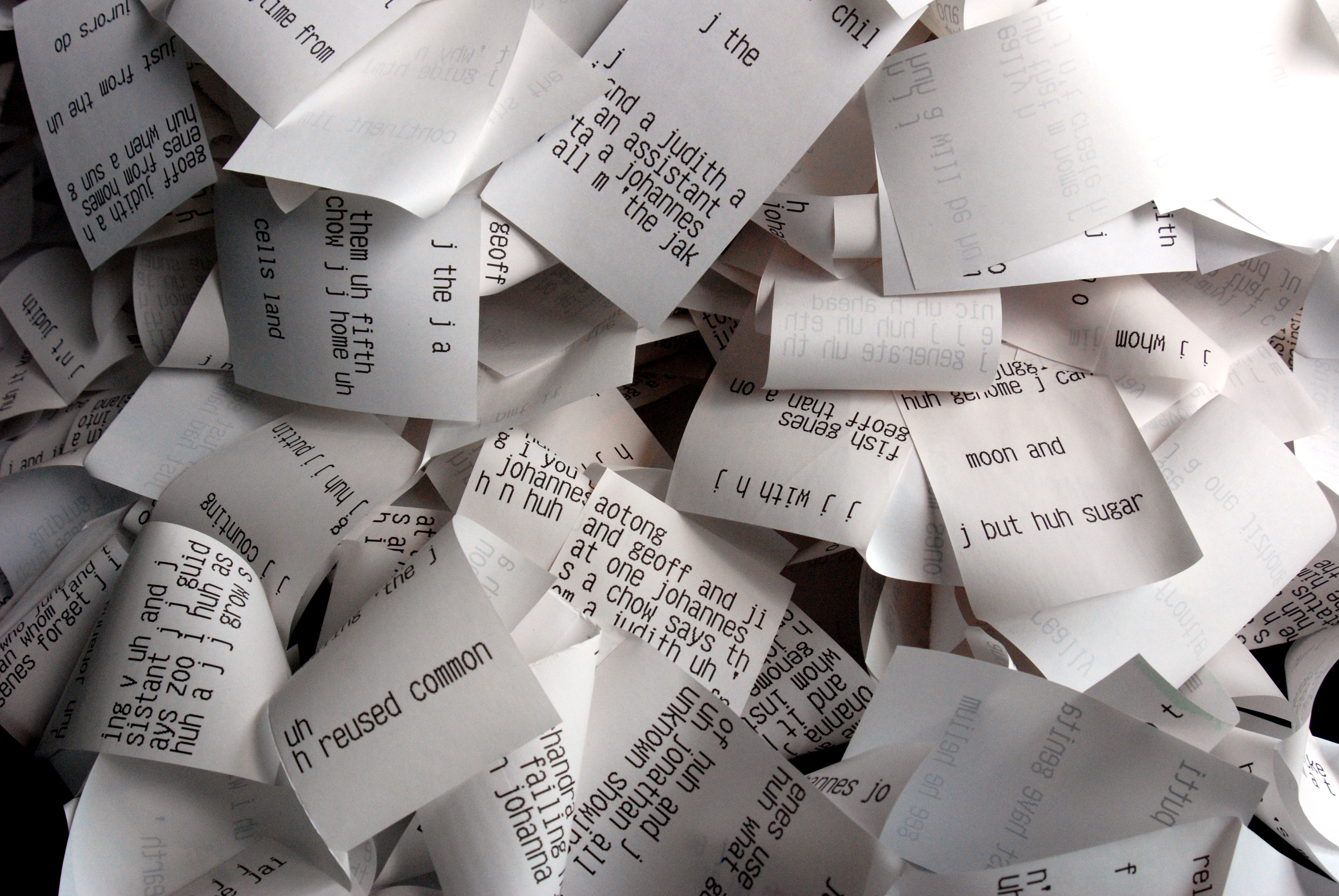
Listening Post (2009)

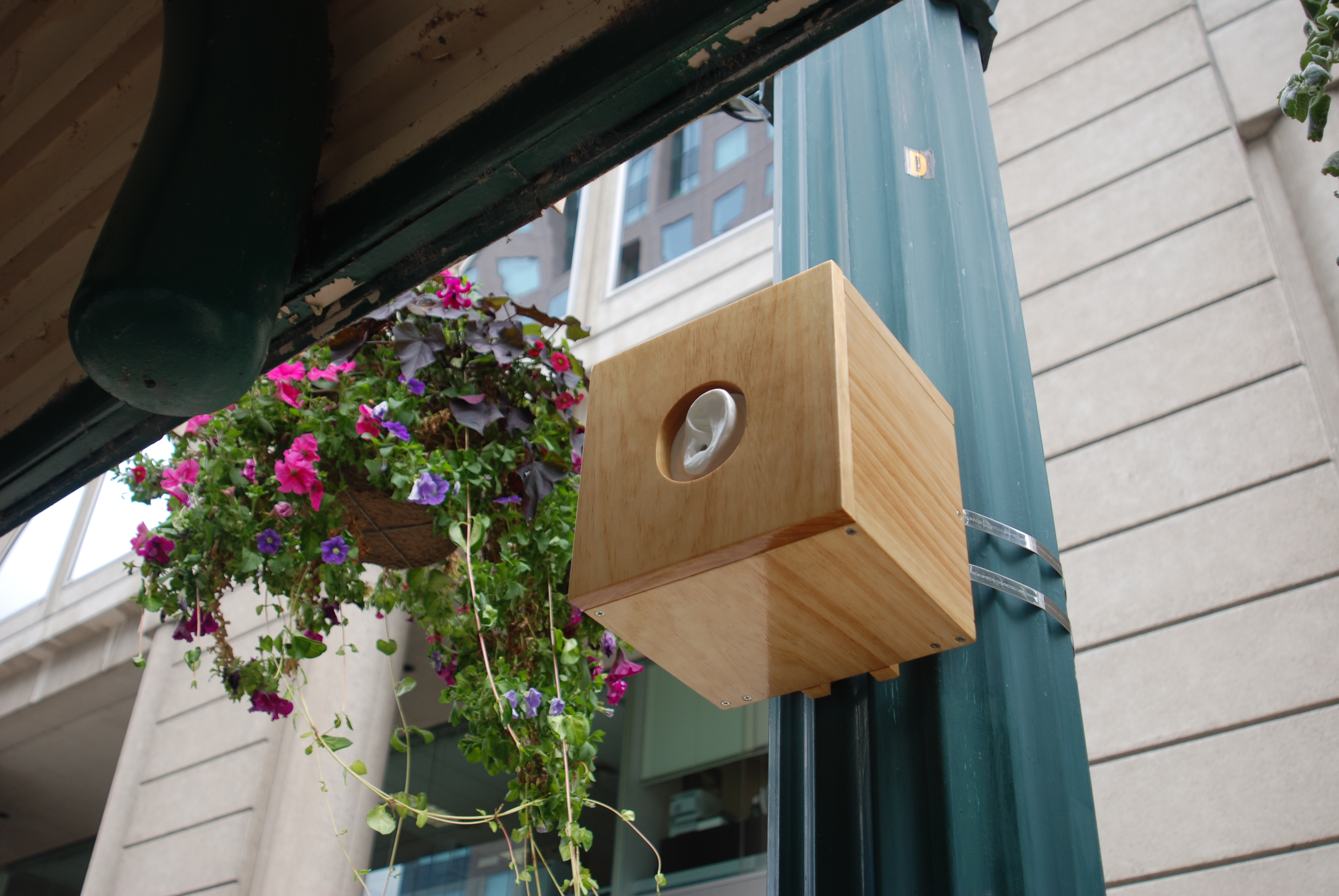
Listening Post (2009)

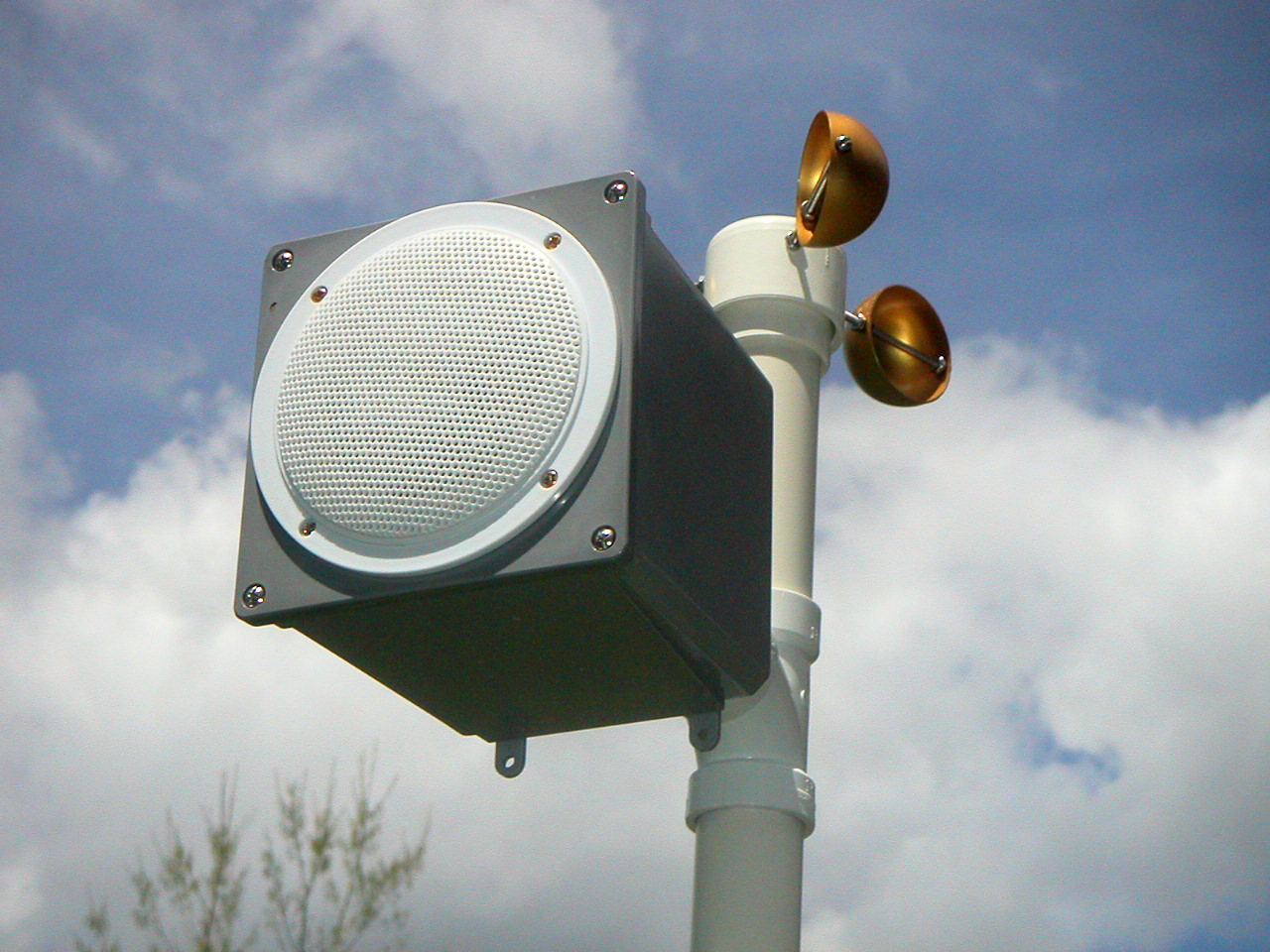
Netlingua (2008)

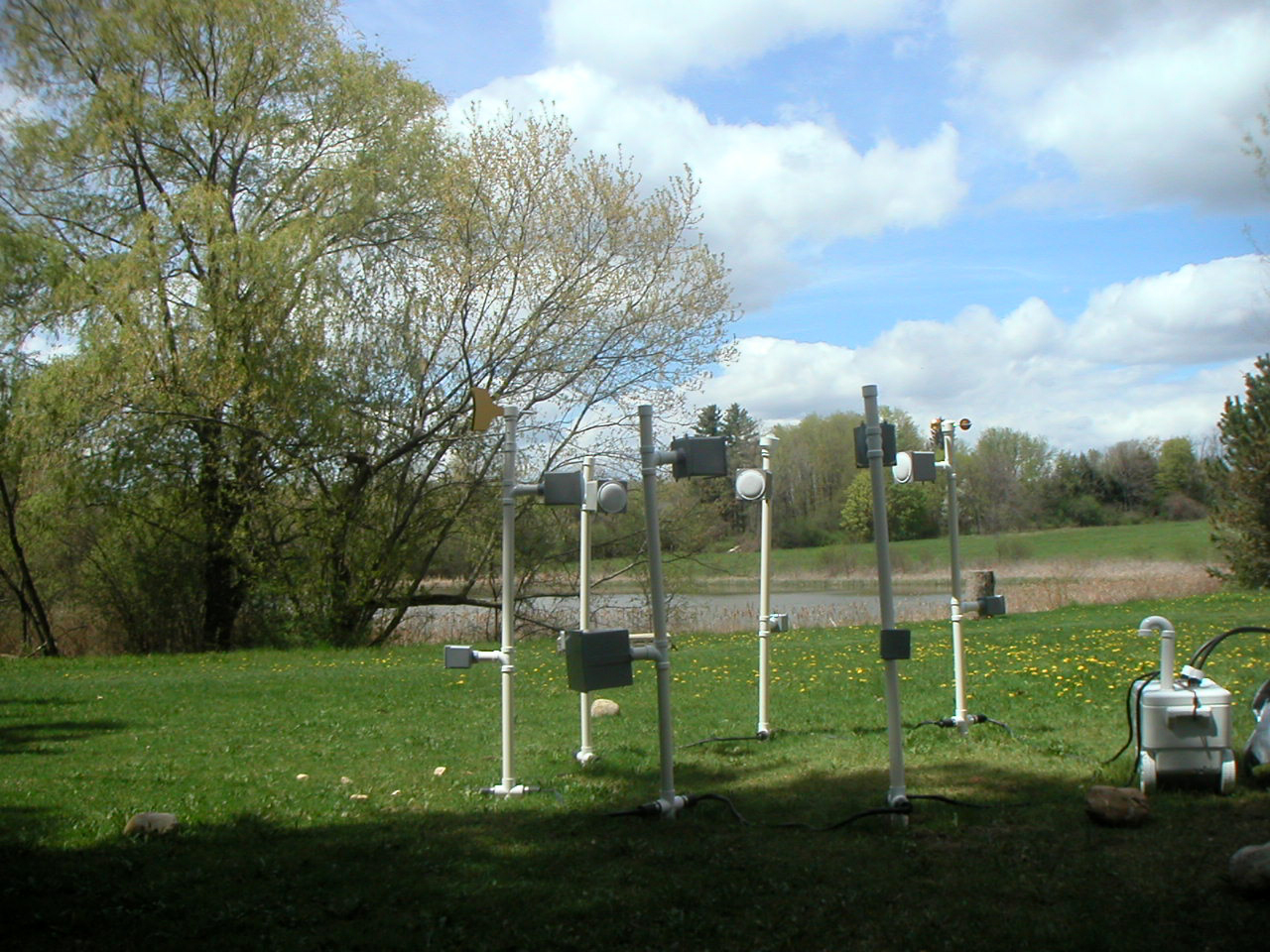
Netlingua (2008)

== See also ==
- Parabon NanoLabs, which utilizes a similar technique of forensic artwork
