= Tonya Foster =

American poet, essayist, and professor

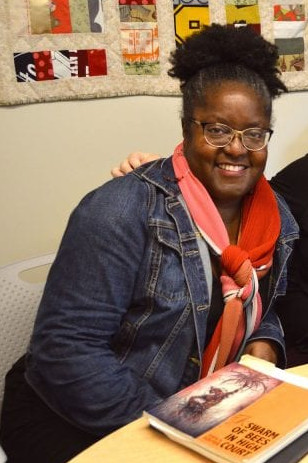
- Tonya Forster in 2019
- Born: January 20, 1966; Bloomington, Indiana U.S.
- Occupations: Poet, essayist and scholar
- Employer: San Francisco State University

Tonya Monique Foster (born January 20, 1966), is an American poet, essayist, and professor at San Francisco State University.

== Biography ==
Foster was born in Bloomington, Illinois but raised in New Orleans, Louisiana. She earned a BA from Tulane University. She then went on to obtain an MFA from the University of Houston. She earned her PhD from CUNY Graduate Center.

== Career ==
She has taught at Bard College, Queens College CUNY, Baruch College CUNY, and California College of the Arts. She is the George and Judy Marcus Endowed Chair, Associate Professor at San Francisco State University,

== Awards ==
- 2023 C.D. Wright Award for Poetry
- Foster has received fellowships from New York Foundation for the Arts, the Macdowell Colony, the Ford Foundation, the Mellon Foundation, and the Graduate Center, CUNY, where she was a PhD candidate.
- 2020–2021 Radcliffe Institute for Advanced Study Fellow
- Recipient of a 2020 Creative Capital Award.

== Bibliography ==
- A Swarm of Bees in High Court ISBN 9780988539914 OCLC 835951451
- La Grammaire des Os ISBN 9782848092829
- Third Mind: Creative Writing through Visual Art (co-editor) ISBN 9780915924943 OCLC 48850972
