= Hardly Strictly Bluegrass =

Annual music festival in San Francisco

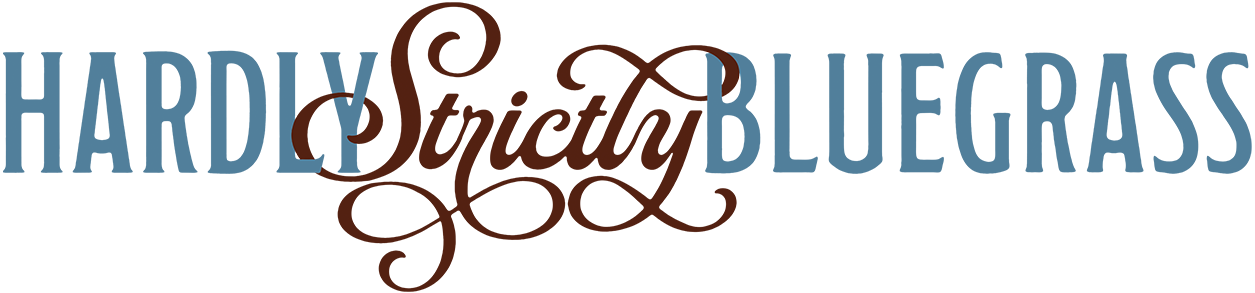
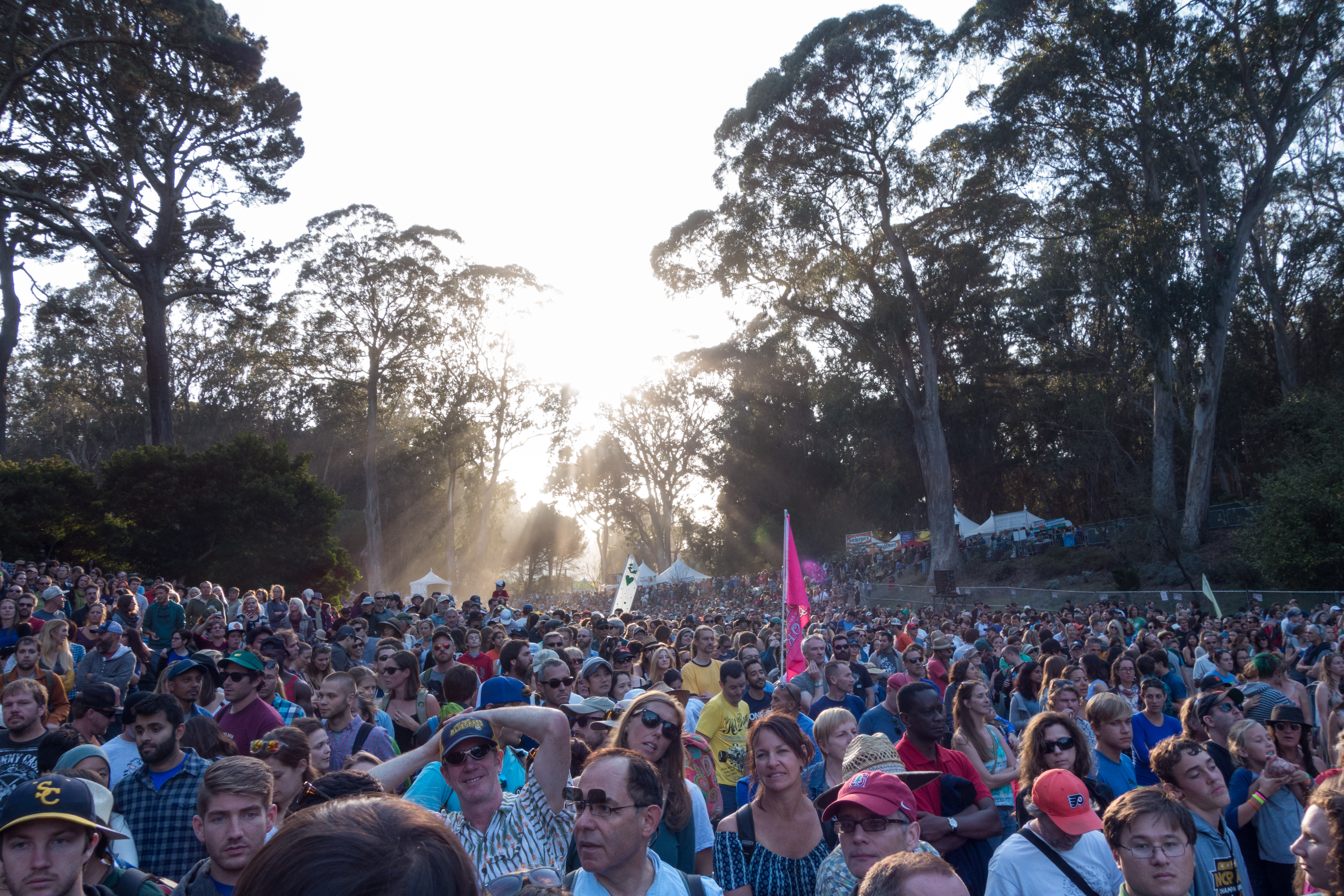
- Hardly Strictly Bluegrass in 2015
- Genre: Bluegrass music
- Dates: First weekend of October (currently)
- Locations: Golden Gate Park (San Francisco, California, U.S.)
- Coordinates: 37.7698°N 122.483848°W
- Years active: 2001–present
- Founders: Warren Hellman
- Attendance: 750,000+ (over 3 days)
- Website: hardlystrictlybluegrass.com

Hardly Strictly Bluegrass (HSB), originally Strictly Bluegrass, is an annual free and non-commercial music festival held the first weekend of October in Golden Gate Park in San Francisco, California. Conceived and subsidized by San Francisco venture capitalist Warren Hellman, the festival has been held every year since the first event in 2001.

From its outset, the festival has been subsidized by Hellman. Various corporations have offered to sponsor the event over the years, but Hellman always turned them down, saying in an interview, "I want to keep it entirely free and noncommercial". After his 2011 death, Hellman's heirs and his foundation have continued to fully fund and oversee the festival. For some performers, the unique fact that the event is unsponsored is very important to character. In an interview with Hellman, Ketch Secor of Old Crow Medicine Show said that part of what keeps the event focused on the music and the community is Warren's decision to ensure it is not "consumption driven" and the audience is not "bombarded with signage".

Originally Hellman intended only to invite bluegrass musicians. But soon artists from other genres were invited to the event, and in 2004 the word "Hardly" was added to reflect its expanded scope. The festival draws very large crowds, nearly equal in number to the entire population of San Francisco. In 2011, the festival drew an estimated 750,000 people over the course of the three-day event.

== History ==
Hellman first mentioned his dream of holding a festival for bluegrass music in the park to Jonathan Nelson in 2001. Nelson had worked for Bill Graham Presents, and introduced Hellman to booking agent and executive producer Dawn Holliday, and production manager Sheri Sternberg at a lunch. Holliday and Sternberg agreed to help and would continue to produce the festival, respectively, each year thereafter.

From the start, Hellman most wanted Hazel Dickens to perform at the festival but Dickens, who was known for political songs about workers' strikes, was wary of performing because of Hellman's wealth and background. She later agreed, and went on to perform at the festival every year from 2001 until her death in April 2011. The 2011 festival was dedicated to the memory of Dickens.

The festival name and scope was changed when, at the very first festival in 2001, Emmylou Harris played with her not-strictly-bluegrass band. Hellman was a fan of her bluegrass sound under the band name Nash Ramblers, but at the time she was touring as Spyboy. She played the festival as Spyboy, which had a New Orleans style rhythm section. Hellman did not complain, and "Hardly" was eventually added to the name of the festival in 2004. Before her set in 2009, Emmylou Harris was awarded an honorary doctorate from Berklee College of Music by the president of the college. In response to the Coronavirus disease 2019, the 2020 show switched from in-person to digital, streaming a series of prerecorded performances over the Internet. Additionally, HSB worked with Artist Relief to administer $1 million in relief aid to musicians. Annual in-person festivals in Hellman Hollow resumed after the pandemic.

== Performing artists ==
Some frequent performers over the years, each with five or more appearances, have been:

- Emmylou Harris
- Dry Branch Fire Squad
- Hazel Dickens
- Robert Earl Keen
- Gillian Welch
- Kevin Welch & Kieran Kane & Fats Kaplin
- The Del McCoury Band
- Earl Scruggs
- Guy Clark & Verlon Thompson
- Ricky Skaggs & Kentucky Thunder
- Peter Rowan
- Buddy Miller
- Alison Brown
- Dale Ann Bradley & Coon Creek
- Laurie Lewis & The Right Hands
- Moonalice
- Ralph Stanley & The Clinch Mountain Boys
- Jimmie Dale Gilmore
- Nick Lowe
- Poor Man's Whiskey
- Steve Earle & The Dukes
- Tim O'Brien
- The Wronglers
- Conor Oberst
- Justin Townes Earle
- T-Bone Burnett
- Jon Langford

== See also ==
- List of bluegrass music festivals
- List of country music festivals
