= Sheryl Oring =

American journalist

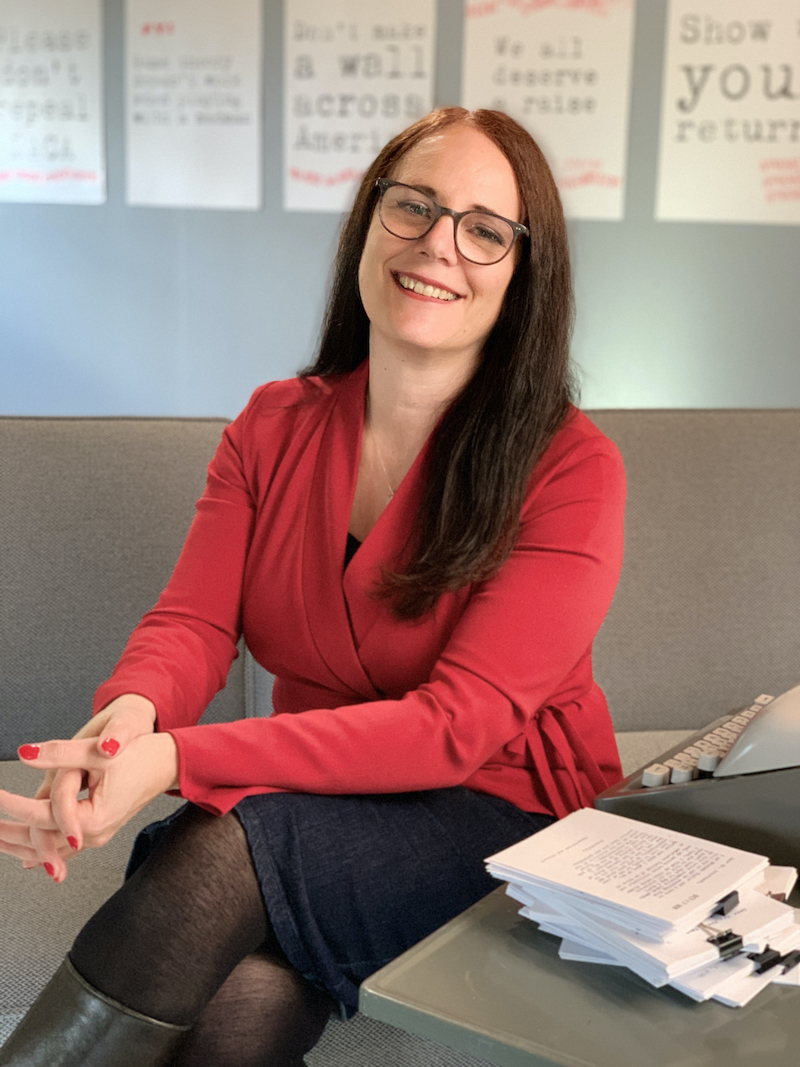
- Born: circa. 1966
- Known for: Performance art using a typewriter
- Notable work: "Writer's Block" and "I Wish to Say"
- Style: Performance Artist
- Movement: Free speech
- Awards: Fellow, New York Foundation for the Arts; Grant Recipient, Creative Capital Foundation
- Website: sheryloring.org

Sheryl Oring (born c. 1966) is an international performance artist and art professor. She is known for the "I Wish to Say" series of performances, where participants dictate messages that she transcribes using an old typewriter. She is also the Chair of the James Pearson Duffy Department of Art and Art History at Wayne State University. She began her career as a journalist, before moving to Germany to study art.

== Early life and career ==
Oring was born c. 1966. Her parents were both academics. As a child, she moved to New York, near Cornell University, where she was exposed to political advocacy at a young age. Oring earned a bachelor's degree in journalism at the University of Colorado Boulder in 1987. She then moved to California, where she worked as a journalist for about a decade. Oring held positions at the International Herald Tribune, the San Francisco Chronicle, and briefly at The New York Times. Oring became disenchanted with the media and moved to Germany to study art for six years.

According to Oring, her work as an artist was influenced by the political clout artists have in Germany. In 1999, Oring created an exhibit called "Writer's Block," which featured 600 typewriters in 21 metal cages. The exhibit was regarding the censorship of Jewish citizens in Nazi Germany. It was first exhibited in 1999 at the site of a Nazi book burning. The exhibit was later shown at Bryant Park, the PEN American Center, in Budapest, and other locations. Oring was inspired to create the exhibit in part by a memorial by artist Micha Ullman on Bebelplatz in Berlin, Germany.

Oring was an assistant professor at University of North Carolina at Greensboro and served as the Chair of the James Pearson Duffy Department of Art and Art History at Wayne State University. As of January 2023, she is the dean of University of the Arts' School of Art.

== "I Wish to Say" ==
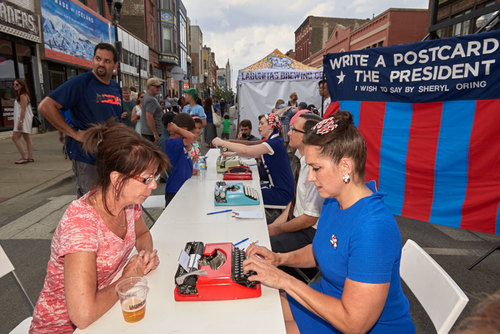
An "I Wish to Say" performance in Chicago

Oring grew frustrated that many Europeans stereotyped Americans as supporting war in general and the 2003 Iraq War specifically. She moved back to the United States, and created a performance art piece called "I Wish to Say." In this exhibit, people dictated letters to then-President George W. Bush that Oring typed-up on a postcard using an old-fashioned typewriter. The postcards were addressed to the White House and Oring kept carbon copies. The very first "I Wish to Say" performance was done in February 2004 for the First Amendment Project. The performance was originally intended to demonstrate the range of opinions Americans have.

Oring continued doing similar participatory artworks using a typewriter for decades. Within the first year, she had typed 600 postcards and travelled 5,000 kilometers setting up the exhibit in different U.S. states. Then, she presented similar performances in Germany, prior to the election of a new Chancellor, and near where the Berlin Wall used to be, where she asked participants what thoughts the wall prompts for them. In 2006, Oring did a performance on the U.S. President's birthday, whereby participants wrote birthday messages to the President. The themes of the performances have changed over time, with changes in popular political issues, policies, and presidents. In one performance, she asked people in the Tampa Bay area to tell her what they love about Tampa, Florida, as part of a public art project commissioned by the Tampa airport.

By 2018, Oring had typed several thousand postcards and performed the work more than 71 times. Some of the postcards were used in an art exhibit at the Museum of the Kennedys in Berlin, Germany and she wrote a book based on the exhibit called "Activating Democracy: The 'I Wish to Say' Project." The book is focused on free speech and political participation. Oring won several awards and grants as a result of the exhibit series, such as a grant from Creative Capital and a fellowship from the New York Foundation for the Arts.
