= Artist Relief =

U.S. grantmaking organization

- Founded: 2020
- Type: Financial Relief
- Purpose: Emergency Grant Distribution
- Method: Direct aid
- Website: www.artistrelief.org

Artist Relief is an emergency initiative founded in 2020 by a coalition of national arts grantmakers to offer financial and informational resources to artists across the United States in response to the COVID-19 pandemic.

== History ==
Artist Relief is an emergency initiative organized by the Academy of American Poets, Artadia, Creative Capital, Foundation for Contemporary Arts, MAP Fund, National YoungArts Foundation, and United States Artists—all mid-sized national arts grantmakers—to distribute $5,000 grants to artists facing dire financial emergencies due to COVID-19; serve as an ongoing informational resource; and co-launch the COVID-19 Impact Survey for Artists and Creative Workers, designed by Americans for the Arts, to better identify and address the needs of artists moving forward. As of August 2020, the initiative had distributed $13.5 million through these grants.

In 2020, the annual concert series Hardly Strictly Bluegrass worked with Artist Relief to administer a $1 million artist relief fund to musicians affected by the COVID-19 pandemic.
