= Lead Pencil Studio =

Lead Pencil Studio is the working name of the art and architecture collaborative founded in 1997 by Annie Han and Daniel Mihalyo. Lead Pencil Studio are the winners of the 2007 Founder's Rome Prize in Architecture from the American Academy in Rome and were recognized in 2006 as one of the 'Emerging Voices' by the Architectural League of New York.

== Notable installations ==
=== Maryhill Double ===
Built directly across from the Maryhill Museum, on the plateaus that overlook the Columbia River Gorge, Maryhill Double was a temporary installation/building that duplicated the exact interior volume of the museum that is mirrored. Standing from July 5, 2006, through October 1, 2006, and constructed solely from scaffolding and blue construction netting, Maryhill Double re-framed not only the unusual history of the Maryhill Museum but also the significance of constructing architecture within unadulterated landscapes. Critics have noted that "The museum and its ghost-like Double work as a paired form, operating to emphasize the scale of their plateau site and to dramatize the role of human effort and desire to engage nature or subdue it". Ironically enough, during its lifespan the Double was classified as a "billboard" for zoning and legal purposes.

=== Retail/Commercial ===
A temporary installation in an aging upscale mall located in Rainier Tower (designed by architect, Minoru Yamasaki) in Seattle, WA, Retail/Commercial occupied a former Italian men's clothing boutique by inserting four distinct retail environments stripped of all merchandise and represented at full-scale by architectural section.

=== Without Room ===
Without Room faithfully recreates in exacting detail the entire living room of an apartment dweller in Greensboro, NC. The piece, on display at the Weatherspoon Art Museum at The University of North Carolina at Greensboro from January 17 to April 13, 2008, reconstitutes the entirety of a woman’s possessions rendered homogenous with gray acrylic paint. Paperwork, books, CDs, collectible treasures, furniture, and electronic devices lost their biographical specificity and appeared as anonymous shapes. Unpainted items included piles of clothing and shoes, left as an homage reference to the originating inhabitant. The site-specific installation intended to explore the nesting and spatial consequences of human dwelling. The living room was selected from a pool of volunteers through a museum advertisement searching for respondents who occupy small living spaces.

=== After ===
A two-part installation at the Boise Art Museum from November 8, 2008, to May 3, 2009, After is an exploration of the modern forces that create and construct space—architecturally, visually, and conceptually. The project was composed of two large constructions individually titled, After Billboard, and After:Dwelling. "After Billboard" features a roped-off pile of rubble with a sign surface made entirely of layered paper and real estate advertisements, capped with a window-like opening that exposes the crisscrossing two-by-fours that are the superstructure. Vaguely discernible real estate slogans and window details of this exterior piece were intended to reference the house-sized construction on the interior of the museum. "After Dwelling" was composed of a landscape of gravel approximately 25 ft x 50 ft with a sharply defined rectilinear impression suggesting a building foundation. Floating above this field were corners of a house made entirely from architectural foam board and skim coated cement. Taken together the individual pieces describe the perimeter of a house in the uncertain state of construction or demolition and feature several design clichés identified with an anonymous modern architecture. "The Boise Weekly" noted that the billboard promises, 'Your Piece of Blue Sky!' The wall text tells us the artists are exploring the complex systems involved in the production of space. In other words, advertising dominates the view.

Oregon State Hospital Memorial

This installation utilizes the defunct crematorium at the Oregon State Hospital as a vessel for housing the unclaimed remains of over 3,500 wards of the Oregon State Hospital in Salem, Oregon. The building was originally constructed in 1896 for use as a "pestilence house," and later converted to the hospital's morgue. The copper containers in which the remains were contained are now in a state of severe oxidization. The artists used this as a powerful visual metaphor for the lives of those who lived out their lives in this institution. The actual remains were transferred to ceramic containers, which now occupy a perforated columbarium wall. The ceramic urns are inscribed with names, dates of birth, and dates of death of each individual, and families may choose to reclaim the remains or leave them to rest at the memorial site.

== Publications ==
- "1000x Landscape Architecture" by Chris van Uffelen. Publisher: Verlaghaus - Braun. Pub. Date: December, 2008. ISBN 978-3-938780-60-2; ISBN 3-938780-60-6. 1,024pp.
- "Lead Pencil Studio: Annie Han + Daniel Mihalyo: After" by Gary Sangster. Publisher: Boise Art Museum, GAC. Pub. Date: April, 2009. ISBN 978-0-295-98934-1. 56pp
- "Wood Burners" by Daniel Mihalyo. Publisher: Princeton Architectural Press. Pub. Date: September,1997. ISBN 978-1-56898-104-8; ISBN 1-56898-104-X. 119pp
- "Minus Space/150 Works of Art : Lead Pencil Studio" by Elizabeth Brown. Publisher: Henry Art Gallery, University of Washington. Pub. Date: February, 2006. ISBN 0-935558-43-8. 16pp
