= Kerry Skarbakka =

American artist and academic

Kerry Skarbakka is an American artist and an assistant professor of photography at Oregon State University. He is most known for his photographed images of himself apparently falling. One of his well-known images shows him apparently about to fall from the Vance Creek Bridge in Washington State timber country.

== Early life and education ==
Kerry Skarbakka was born in Duluth, Minnesota. His family embraced Christian fundamentalism when Skarbakka was a young boy. They moved to a farming community in Tennessee. At age 7, Skarbakka found that he could speak in tongues. The Chicago Reader states that he "witnessed faith healings at tent revivals and in storefronts and basements. People he knew told of encounters with the devil." This early experience informed his career as an artist.

Skarbakka received his BA in studio art with an emphasis in sculpture from the University of Washington School of Art. In 2003 he received an MFA in photography from Columbia College Chicago.

== Work ==
One of Skarbakka's first major exhibitions occurred at the Museum of Contemporary Art, Chicago as part of their "New Artists/New Work" series. The photography shown depicted "anxiety-provoking, large-format photographs" showing the artist falling to near certain death. In 2005, one of Skarbakka's "falling" works was featured on the cover of Aperture with an accompanying essay by Wayne Koestenbaum.

In 2005, one of his "falling man" performances sparked controversy when some claimed it was a recreation of some of the tragic jumpers from the World Trade Center during September 11 attacks. The artist said that the images were inspired both by the "death of his mother and the events of September 11." He began the project to deal with his "emotional pain and existential insecurity."

== Honors and awards ==
In 2005 Skarbakka received a Creative Capital grant for his project Fluid. The project premiered at Lawrimore Project in Seattle, Washington.
