= Jaaga =

- Community Art & Technology Space
- Formation: 2009
- Purpose: Hackerspace coworking
- Location: India
- Origin: Bangalore
- Founders: Freeman Murray, Archana Prasad, volunteers
- Affiliations: Samuha, One Shanti Road, Maraa
- Website: Jaaga homepage

Jaaga is a community space built from pallet racking in downtown Bangalore to serve the local arts and technology communities.

== History ==
Jaaga developed out of frustration Archana Prasad experienced while looking for a suitable building for Samuha, an artist run gallery coop she was setting up. Bangalore Architect, Naresh Narasimhan, offered up a 1400 sq. ft. plot of land he owned in Richmond Town across from the Karnataka State Hockey Association with the condition that it is vacated on request. Freeman Murray volunteered to drive construction efforts. The initial frame for Jaaga was erected in August 2009. Samuha found another location so Jaaga developed its own identity.

== Physical Structure ==
Jaaga is a free standing structure constructed with pallet racking. The floors are plywood or blockboard, and the external walls are recycled East Asian billboards. Jaaga has a 1kva solar array from which it draws most of its electricity. It stands on 84 square meters and nets 312 square meters of useful space. Because of the flexibility of the pallet racks, the floors of the building can be moved to reflect the changing needs of its inhabitants. It can also be broken down quickly and moved to a new location leaving the property undamaged. In June 2011 the Jaaga structure was dismantled and moved over to its new location a few blocks away, proving the nomadic nature of this form of experimental architecture. The new land-owner is Sharath Reddy who is keen on setting up an experimental Gaia - an organic cafe alongside the Jaaga building. This new avatar of Jaaga will be twice as large and set on a property three times the size of the previous location.

== Startup ==
Jaaga Startup is an Incubator for creative entrepreneurs.
