= Tree of 40 Fruit =

Series of Van Aken trees

- Tree of Forty Fruit
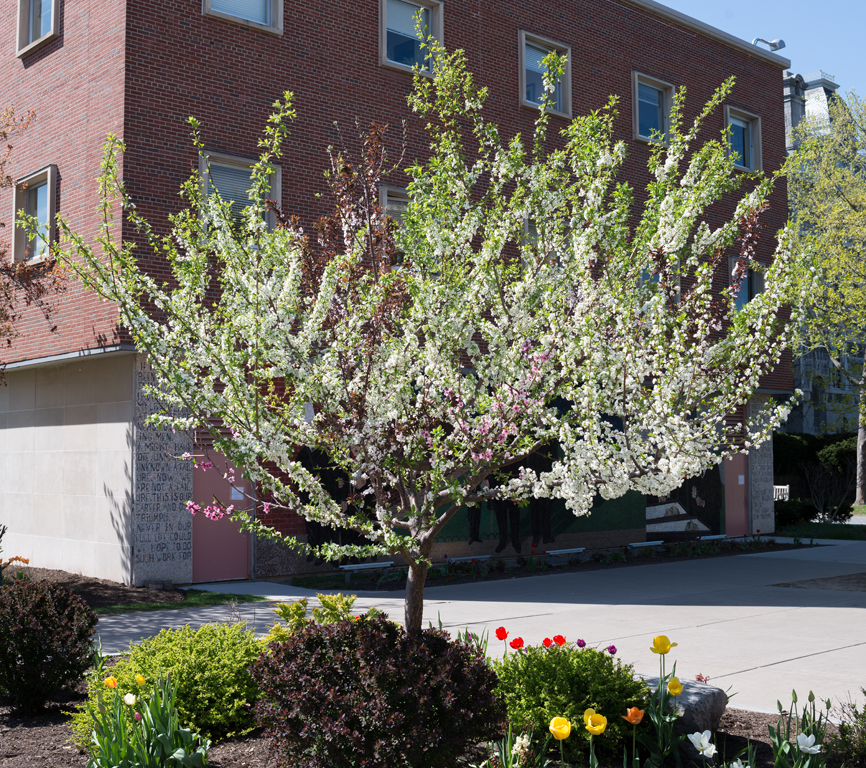
- 'Tree 75' coming into blossom on the Syracuse University campus, where Van Aken is on the Sculpture faculty.
- Artist: Sam Van Aken
- Year: 2008
- Location: Syracuse University campus, Syracuse, United States; 43°02′17″N 76°08′02″W
- Owner: Syracuse University
- Accession: 2014.0072
- Website: www.treeof40fruit.com

A Tree of 40 Fruit is one of a series of fruit trees created by the Syracuse University associate professor Sam Van Aken using the technique of grafting. Each tree produces forty types of stone fruit, of the genus Prunus, ripening sequentially from July to October in the United States.

== Development ==
Sam Van Aken is an associate professor of sculpture at Syracuse University. He is a contemporary artist who works beyond traditional art making and develops new perspective art projects in communication, botany, and agriculture. Aken was a 2018 Artist-in-Residence at the McColl Center for Art + Innovation in Charlotte, NC.

His family is Pennsylvania Dutch, and he grew up on the family farm.

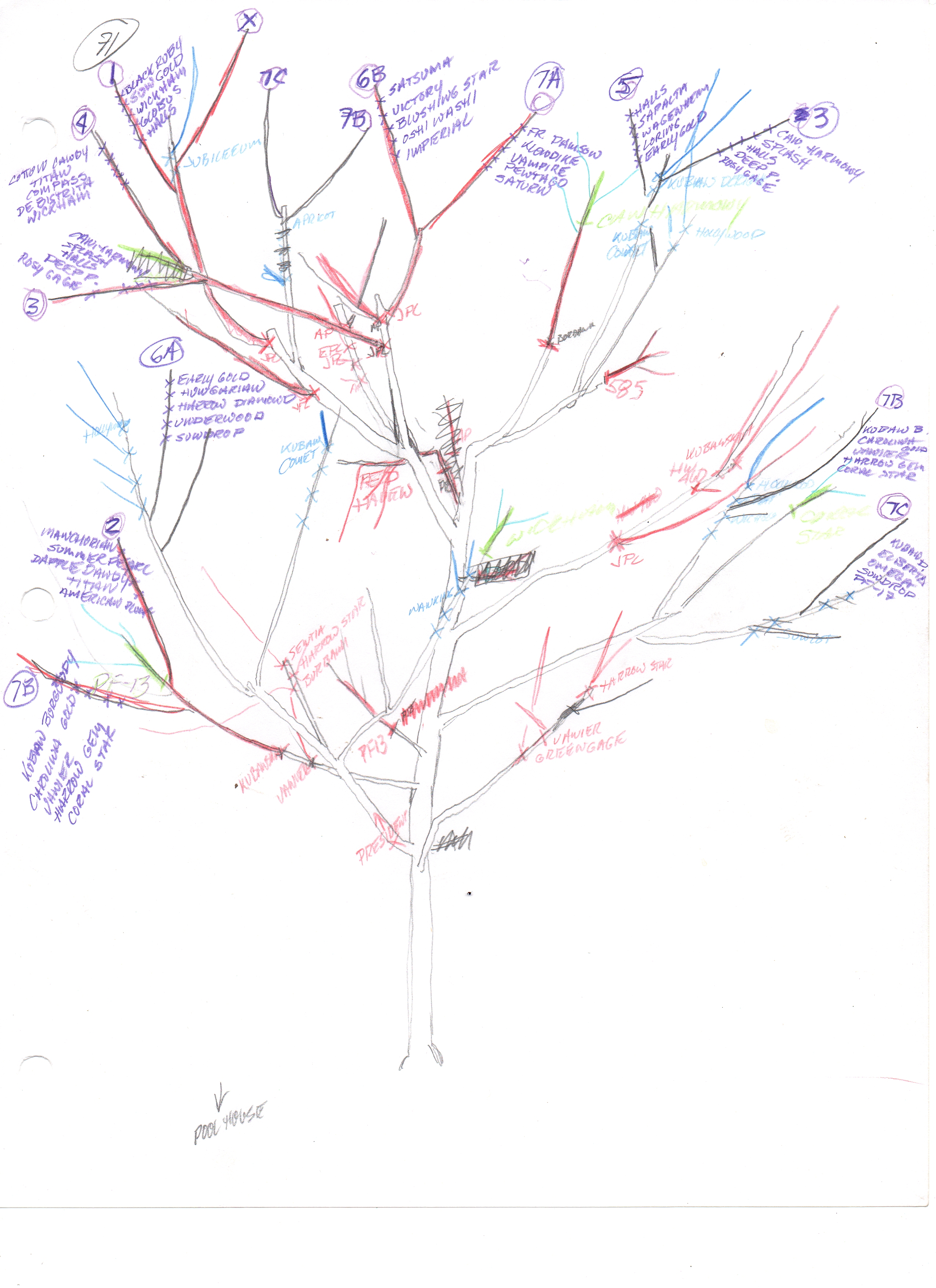
Artist's planning diagram of "Tree 71"

In 2008, while looking for specimens to create a multicolored blossom tree as an art project, Van Aken acquired the 3-acre (1.2 ha) orchard of the New York State Agricultural Experiment Station, which was closing due to funding cuts. He began to graft buds from some of the over 250 heritage varieties grown there, some unique, onto a stock tree. Over the course of about five years the tree accumulated branches from forty different "donor" trees, each with a different fruit, including almond, apricot, cherry, nectarine, peach and plum varieties.

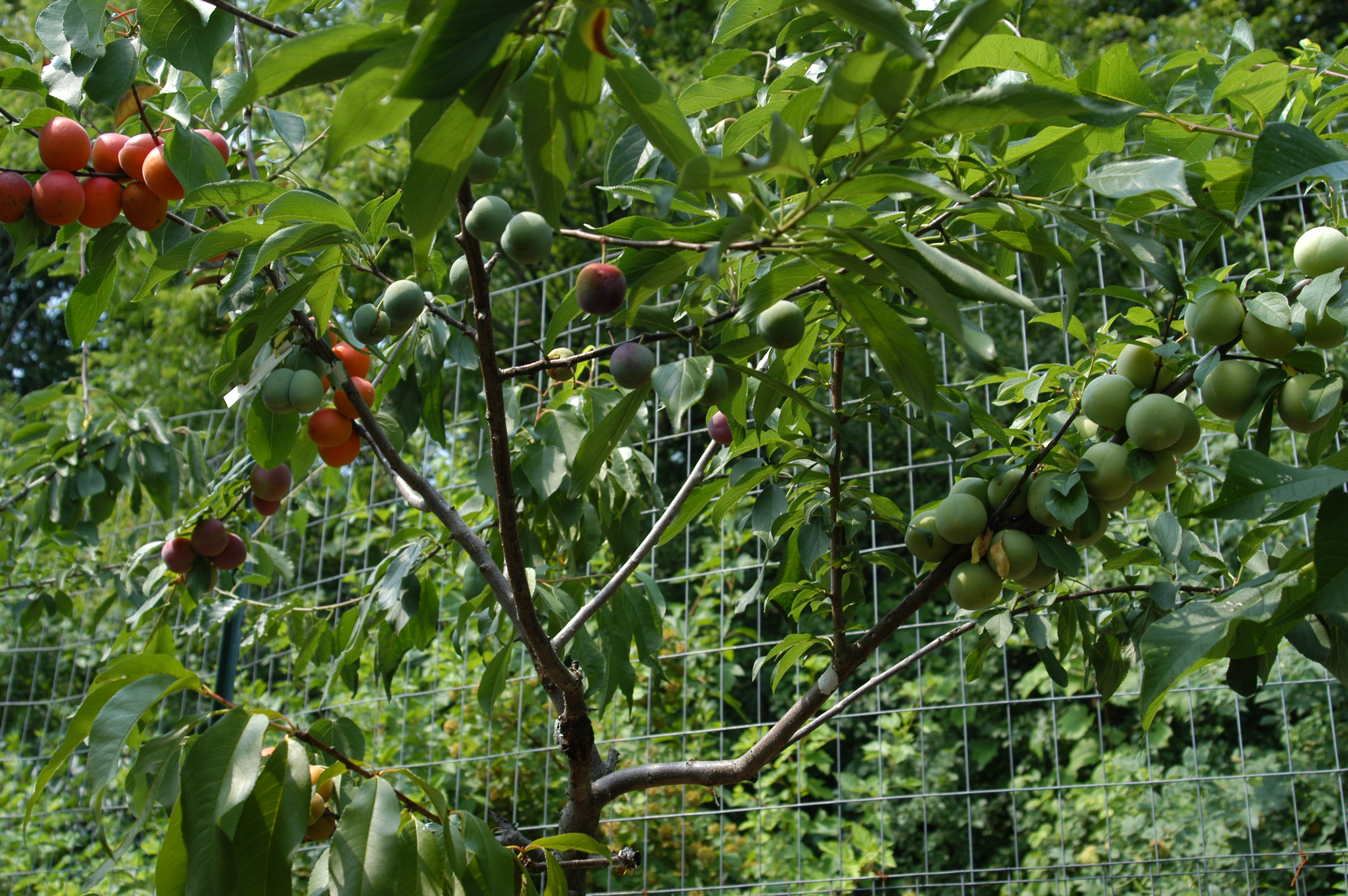
A Tree of 40 Fruit fruiting in the artist's nursery

Each spring the tree's blossom is a mix of different shades of red, pink and white.

The tree of 40 fruit was originally conceived as an art project, and Sam Van Aken hoped that people would notice that the tree has different kinds of flowers in spring and has different types of fruit in summer. However, the project also introduces the changes in agricultural practices over the centuries.

== Distribution ==
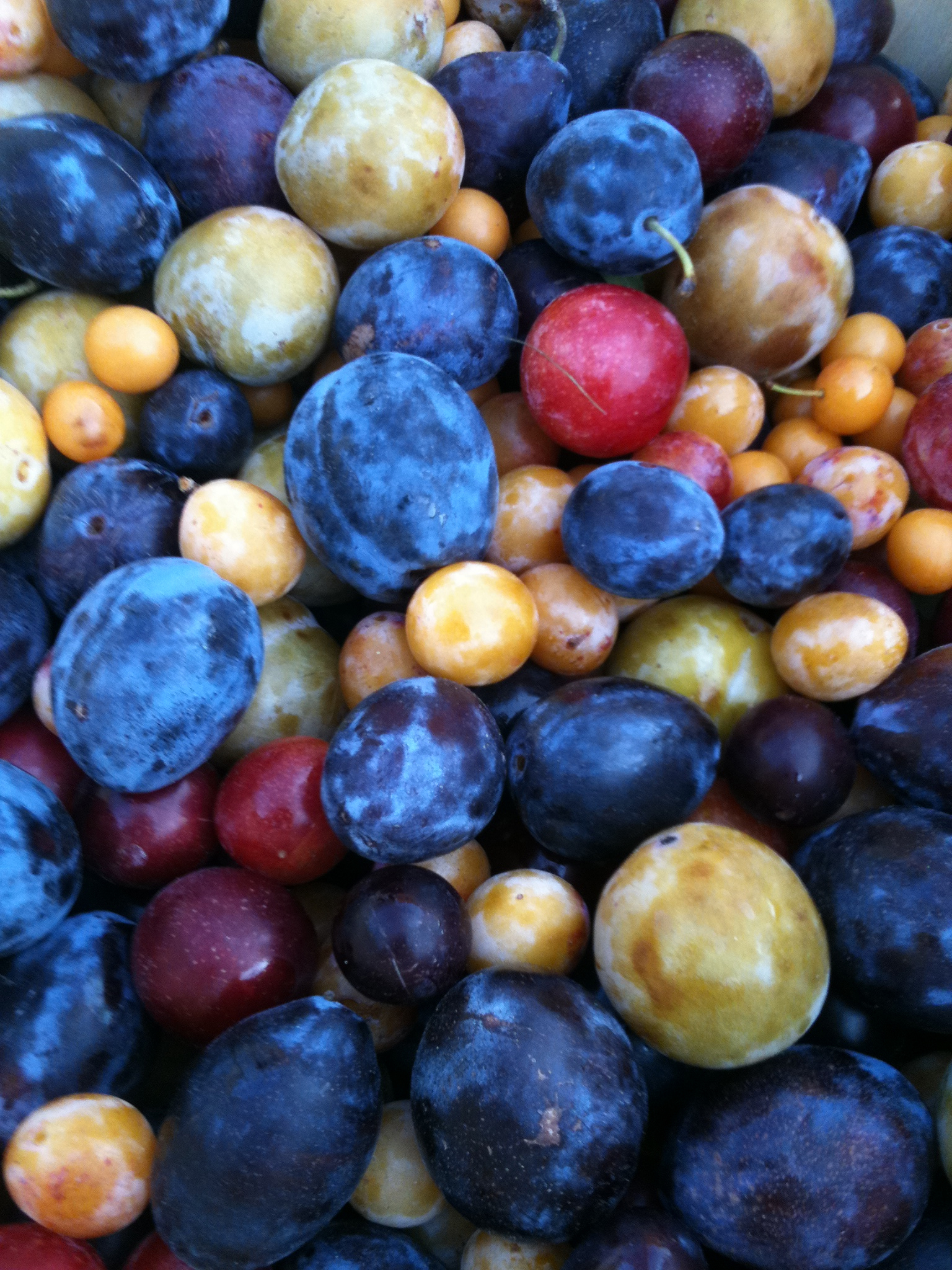
The variety of fruit, harvested from one of the trees in one week, in August 2011

As of 2014, Van Aken had produced 16 Trees of 40 Fruit, installed in a variety of private and public locations, including community and university gardens, museums, and private collections. Locations include Newton, Massachusetts; Pound Ridge, New York; Short Hills, New Jersey; Bentonville, Arkansas; and San Jose, California.
