= Outset Contemporary Art Fund =

UK-based arts charity

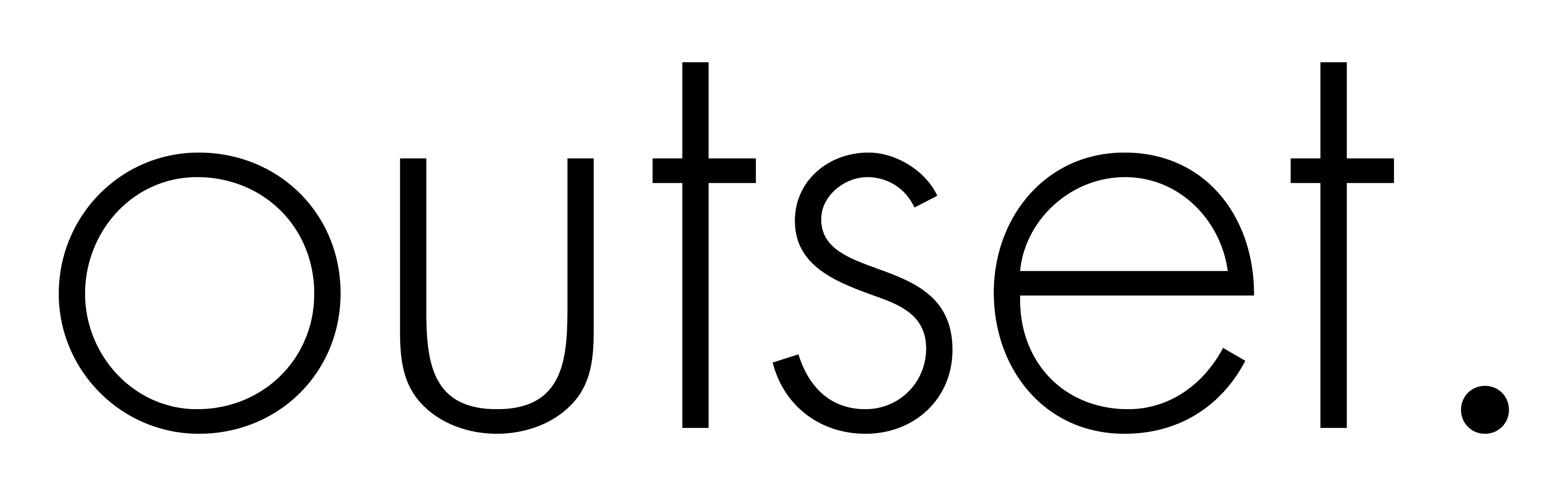
Outset Contemporary Art Fund Logo

Outset Contemporary Art Fund is an arts charity established in 2003, and based in London, England.

The charity was the first organisation to utilise cross-institution collective patronage to fund artistic projects in the UK. It has raised over £13 million for arts institutions, exhibitions, education, residency programmes, initiatives, publications and capital campaigns.

There are currently six active Outset chapters around the world which are independently run, with their own structure, supporters, fundraising models and supported projects. These are based in Germany, Switzerland, India, Israel, the Netherlands, Greece, and Estonia.

== The Outset Partners ==
Established in 2018, Outset Partners is the largest arts grants programme in the world, funded by a group of individuals. Grants are determined through a consensus-driven process by the collective of individual Outset patrons. Outset Partners has awarded grants totalling over £1.6 million to date.

=== Cycle V ===
The Outset Partners Transformative Award 2023

In 2023 Outset Partners awarded £110,000 to the Stellenbosch Triennale for their 2025 iteration of the public festival of contemporary African art, curated by Khanyisile Mbongwa.

Impact Awards 2023

Awards totalling £100,000 were granted to arebyte for the development of their digital tool, ‘arebyte Plugin’, STORE for their after-school programme for young people entitled ‘STORE STORE Build’, Yinka Shonibare Foundation/G.A.S. for the programme ‘Re:assemblages’ and Art Gallery of York University for ‘...from the Transit Bar: Visiting Curator Series’.

=== Cycle IV ===
The Outset Partners Transformative Award 2022[edit]

The African Artists’ Foundation, a non-profit organization, based in Lagos, Nigeria, was awarded £150,000 for their travelling exhibition Dig Where You Stand.

Impact Awards 2022

Awards totalling £125,000 were granted to Los Angeles County Museum of Art (LACMA) for the group exhibition entitled ‘Imagining Black Diasporas: 21st Century Art and Poetics’, UK-based charity, At The Bus, Fondazione ICA Milano for Rebecca Moccia's exhibition ‘Ministry of Loneliness’, Athens-based Locus Athens for their programme ‘Revolution is not a One Time Event’, and Forma for Oliver Chanarin's ‘A Perfect Sentence’.

=== Cycle III ===
==== The Outset Partners Transformative Award 2021 ====
Performa, the long-running US-based performance art organisation, were awarded £150,000.

==== Impact Awards 2021 ====
Awards totalling £125,000 were granted to UK charity Artists in Residence, London's nonprofit Bold Tendencies, Paris's Centre Pompidou, the Filipino organisation Green Papaya Art Projects and the International Curators Forum.

=== Cycle II ===
==== The Outset Partners Transformative Award 2020 ====
The Royal Botanic Garden in Edinburgh and Serpentine Galleries in London were jointly awarded £150,000 for their collaborative work on ecology.

==== Impact Awards 2020 ====
Grants totalling £125,000 were awarded to Kampala-based 32° East (Ugandan Arts Trust); Beit Ha’Gefen gallery in Haifa; the International Curator's Forum; Liverpool Biennial; Nottingham Contemporary; The Power Plant Contemporary Art Gallery.

=== Cycle I ===
==== The Outset Partners Transformative Award 2019 ====
The Constituent Museum, a joint initiative between The Whitworth, Manchester, and the Van Abbemuseum, Eindhoven, enabled the galleries to work with the public to plan the reimagining of their institutions.

==== Impact Awards 2019 ====
Awards totalling £125,000 were awarded to Hayward Gallery, International Curator's Forum, Victoria & Albert Museum, Kunsthalle Basel, and a final grant awarded jointly to Chisenhale Gallery in London, Spike Island in Bristol, Baltic Centre for Contemporary Art in Gateshead and The Whitworth, Manchester.

== Studiomakers ==
Studiomakers is a major initiative of Outset Contemporary Art Fund. It pioneers new solutions to securing truly-affordable workspaces for the creative industries.

Launched in 2016 at an event hosted by Antony Gormley's studio, Studiomakers was established in response to the rapid reduction of affordable workspaces available to the creative industries in London.

=== Channelling: Outset Studiomakers Corridor ===
On the occasion of the 20th anniversaries of Outset Contemporary Art Fund and Frieze London, recipients of the Outset Studiomakers Prize took over the fair's entrance corridor. In response to its passageway, Channelling invited the visitor to experience and embody the symbolic threshold via artworks of different materialities and disciplines, including photography, video, textile, print, painting and sculpture.

During Frieze 2023 Mark Corfield-Moore's work Gilded – part of the Studiomakers Corridor – was acquired by Arts Council for their inaugural Acquisitions Fund, supported by the Art Fund.

=== Phase Two ===
In 2020, in response to the COVID-19 pandemic, Studiomakers was reoriented to provide emergency assistance working closely with the Mayor of London's ‘Culture At Risk’ office. Studiomakers delivered one-on-one advice sessions, live webinars, legal letter templates, fact sheets and regular newsletters with the assistance of a team of industry professionals including TrustLaw, CBRE, Dechert LLP and CounterCulture LLP. Throughout the COVID-19 pandemic the guidance, rental reductions and pro-bono legal assistance helped over 70 creative and cultural institutions avoid collapse.

=== Phase One ===
Studiomakers Phase One established an evidence base for action, partnering with Harvard Business School to conduct research, and explored different ways to deliver affordable workspace for artists. Across three years Phase One helped to secure over 60,000sqft of temporary workspace that supported hundreds of artists, events and exhibitions.

=== The Creative Land Trust ===
In 2019 Studiomakers and Outset were instrumental in raising £7.5 million to launch the Creative Land Trust through a private/public partnership with the Mayor of London, Arts Council England and Bloomberg Philanthropies. The Creative Land Trust aims to purchase properties for use as affordable workspaces for the creative industries in perpetuity, and in 2019 became an independent charitable organisation.

=== The Studiomakers Prize ===
From 2017 through to 2019 Outset partnered with Tiffany & Co. to annually award rent-free workspaces to seven outstanding MA Fine Art graduates. The Studiomakers Prize delivered a total of 21 years of free studio space, along with career development workshops, ensuring some of the most talented graduates could continue their creative practice in London.

== Outset / Frieze Art Fair Fund to benefit the Tate Collection ==
In 2003 Outset pioneered the first acquisitions fund connected to an art fair. The partnership between Outset Contemporary Art Fund, Frieze Art Fair and Tate enabled the Tate to purchase artwork at the fair for their national collection. The fund raised over £1.5 million.

100 works of art were acquired over ten years from artists including: Pawel Althamer, Hurvin Anderson, Fikret Atay, Martin Boyce, Jeremy Deller, Alexandre de Cunha, Jimmie Durham, Olafur Eliasson, Andrea Fraser, Thomas Hirschhorn, Jesper Just, Alan Kane, Bela Kolárová, Mark Leckey, Daria Martin, Jan Mot, Scott Myles, Frank Nitsche, Henrik Olesen, Walid Raad, Anri Sala, David Shrigley, Lorna Simpson, Simon Starling, Tris Vonna-Michell, Pae White, Akram Zaatari.

Artworks were annually selected by a panel of judges who included: Jan Debbaut (Director, Tate Collection), Paul Schimmel (Chief Curator, Museum of Contemporary Art, Los Angeles) and Suzanne Pagé (Director, Musée d'Art Moderne de la Ville de Paris).

=== Notable acquisitions ===
- "Time" a conceptual work by David Lamelas consisted of an idea: that people should stand in line and state the time to the adjoining person in the queue.
- A grey filing-drawer containing 1,000 blank index cards by Stanley Brouwn.
- "Good Feelings in Good Times" by Roman Ondak was the first performance piece to enter the Tate collection.

== The Robson Orr TenTen Award ==
The TenTen Commission, overseen by the Government Art Collection and Outset Contemporary Art Fund, commissions new artwork from a British artist each year for ten years. The artist is tasked with creating a unique print to be shown in diplomatic buildings worldwide. The commission is sponsored by philanthropists Sybil Robson Orr and Matthew Orr.

=== Year 6 ===
The 2023 The Robson Orr TenTen Award was awarded to Michael Armitage. In Ngaben Michael Armitage pays homage to a close artist-friend in Bali, Indonesia, who recently died.

=== Year 5 ===
The 2022 The Robson Orr TenTen Award was awarded to Rachel Whiteread DBE. Whiteread's Untitled (Bubble) reflects the microscopic form of COVID-19 itself and a time during the height of the pandemic when physical contact and communication became reduced to those within one's ‘bubble’.

=== Year 4 ===
Artist Lubaina Himid who produced 'Old Boat, New Weather'. The artwork depicts aspects of slavery and refuge inspired by climate change and the black lives matter movement. For the first time, the work was launched digitally in The Robson Orr TenTen VR Gallery.

=== Year 3 ===
Artist Yinka Shonibare CBE produced the print ‘Hibiscus and the Rose’. He was inspired by the cultural exchange between Britain and the rest of the world.

=== Year 2 ===
Artist Tacita Dean produced the print ‘Foreign Policy (screenprint edition)’.

=== Year 1 ===
Artist Hurvin Anderson produced the print “Still Life with Artificial Flowers’. The work depicts a glass vase inspired by his mother, who was part of the Windrush Generation.

== National Portrait Gallery Annual Commission ==
The Outset Commission is an annual portrait produced by the National Portrait Gallery with support from Outset Contemporary Art Fund and patron Scott Collins.

=== Year 3 ===
In April 2023, the National Portrait Gallery announced its commission of a new portrait of Sir Nicholas Serota by artist and film director, Sir Steve McQueen. The portrait was displayed for the first time when the Gallery reopened on 22 June 2023, marking the artist's inaugural entry into the National Portrait Gallery's Collection.

=== Year 2 ===
German photographer Andreas Gursky was commissioned to produce a portrait of Jony Ive as he departed his role as Chief Design Officer at Apple Inc.,

=== Year 1 ===
Iranian-born artist and filmmaker Shirin Neshat was commissioned to produce a portrait of Nobel Prize Winner Malala Yousafzai.

== The Outset Climavore Residency ==
Outset offers The Climavore Residency to international artists and curators, providing both studio and living accommodation to those who are engaging with a project or cultural institution in the UK. The space was designed by Turner Prize nominated artists Cooking Sections.

== theVOV ==
An initiative from Outset and art-science collective Visualogical, theVOV was launched in 2020.

theVOV describes itself as “a new virtual ecosystem committed to exploration and innovation in Art x Metaverse to support cultural institutions during this critical time and beyond.”

=== Season One ===
Season One brought together 15 leading UK public galleries including virtual exhibitions of:

- '14 Magnolia Doubles' by Chris Burden from the 2006 exhibition at the South London Gallery.
- Andreas Gursky’s first major UK retrospective from the 2018 exhibition at the Hayward Gallery.
- Yinka Shonibare CBE open air installation from the 2013 exhibition at Yorkshire Sculpture Park.
- Lisa Brice’s Tate Britain exhibition from 2018.
- 'Parliament of Ghost' by Ibrahim Mahama’s from the 2019 exhibition at The Whitworth.
- A group show of female artists curated by Hikari Yokoyama with Sarabande.

== Controversy ==
Outset Contemporary Art Fund has faced significant controversy due to its alleged connections with Israeli security forces and its support of Israel's occupation of Palestine. Critics, including the "Strike Outset" campaign, argue that Outset and its founders have ideological and financial ties to militarized settler-colonialist operations in Palestine, such as the Israeli Defense Forces (IDF) and the Jewish National Fund (JNF). These connections have led to calls for a global boycott of the fund and its projects.

One prominent point of contention was the involvement of Outset's co-founder, Candida Gertler, who is alleged to support activities that normalize Israel's policies in the occupied territories. Critics claim that Gertler has provided social and media assistance to figures like Israeli Prime Minister Benjamin Netanyahu, whom they accuse of perpetuating policies akin to apartheid and genocide against Palestinians. On 29 November 2024 Gertler resigned from all positions within uk arts organisations following an open letter calling for Tate to cut ties with Outset signed by over 1000 artist.
