= Gertler =

Gertler is a surname. Notable people with the surname include:

- André Gertler (1907–1998), Belgian classical violinist
- Brie Gertler, American philosopher
- Candida Gertler (born 1966/67), British/German art collector
- Dan Gertler (born 1973), Israeli businessman
- Greta Gertler, Australian pianist and singer
- Mark Gertler (artist) (1891–1931), British painter
- Mark Gertler (economist) (born 1951), American economist
- Meric Gertler, Canadian academic administrator
- Nat Gertler (born 1965), American writer
- Paul Gertler (born 1955), American economist
- Stefan Gertler (born 1972), German singer
- T. Gertler (born 1946), American writer
- Viktor Gertler (1901–1969), Hungarian film editor and director
- Zak Gertler (born 1955/56), British/German property developer
