= Beatrix Ruf =

German art curator

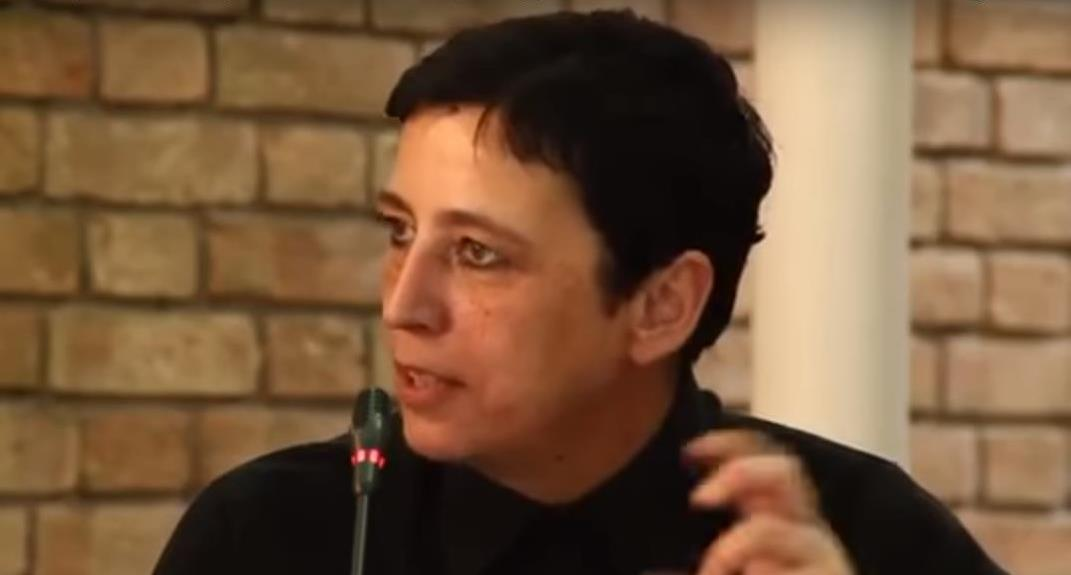
- Beatrix Ruf (2015)
- Born: 1960 (age 65–66); Singen, Germany
- Occupation: Museum director

Beatrix Ruf (born 1960, Singen, Germany) is a German art curator and art advisor who held the position of director of the Stedelijk Museum Amsterdam between November 2014 and October 2017. Formerly she was director of the Kunsthalle Zurich. She is associate editor for JRP-Ringier, works with the LUMA Foundation, the Garage Museum of Contemporary Art in Moscow, and is the artistic director of the Ringier Collection. In 2012, she was listed in the top ten of the most influential people in the art world by ArtReview.

== Early life and education ==
Ruf is the daughter of a land surveyor, later mayor of Singen, a small town near the Swiss border. She studied at a gymnasium and studied psychology, ethnology, art, and cultural sciences at the University of Zurich. After this, she went to the Conservatory of Vienna to study dancing. She became a choreographer and art critic and gave lessons in improvisation at the conservatory.

== Career ==
Ruf started her career in art as curator of the Kunstmuseum Thurgau between 1994 and 1998. She has been the artistic director of the Ringier Collection since 1995. In 1998 she was named as a member of the Art commission of Swiss Re.

From 1998 until 2001, Ruf was the director of Kunsthaus Glarus. In 1999, she joined the board of the Schweizerische Graphische Gesellschaft (SGG).

=== Kunsthalle Zürich, 2001–2014 ===
Ruf replaced Bernhard Bürgi in 2001 as director at Kunsthalle Zurich. In 2012, she completed the acquisition, remodelling and extension of the Kunsthalle Zürich building at the Löwenbräu building in Zürich. That year, she also served on the jury for the Deutsche Börse Photography Prize and the Artissima Illy Present Future Prize.

During her time in Zürich, Ruf served as a juror in commissions and curated numerous exhibitions, written essays and published catalogues on contemporary art. In 2006 she curated the Tate Triennial for Tate Britain, London. She also co-curated the 2008 Yokohama Triennale.

=== Stedelijk Museum, 2014–2017 ===
In 2014 Ruf was appointed director of the Stedelijk Museum in Amsterdam. Her first purchase was the work Zwei Lampen by Isa Genzken (1948). The first exhibition in 2015 was by Tino Sehgal.

Ruf was a member of the juries that selected Magali Reus as 2015 recipient of the Prix de Rome and Helen Marten as 2016 recipient of the Turner Prize.

On October 17, 2017, Ruf resigned as director of the Stedelijk after reports in the Dutch news media detailed how, since 2014, she had been earning nearly a half million euros per year as a private art consultant, above and beyond the salary she received from the Stedelijk, and that she had also failed to report those activities and earnings. Her art consultancy activities consisted, in part, of having the Stedelijk officially borrow her clients' artworks, whereby the Stedelijk's prestigious imprimatur would then cause those artworks to increase in value. Several weeks beforehand, Dutch newspaper NRC Handelsblad also reported that Ruf had brokered a deal whereby the Stedelijk was to receive a gift of 600 artworks from the German art collector and dealer Thomas Borgmann; in fact, the actual gift consisted of 200 artworks, and was contingent upon the Stedeljk agreeing to purchase seven other artworks from Borgmann in exchange for €1.5 million. This transaction was initially absent from the Stedelijk's annual report, until the NRC Handelblad's publication of the details resulted in the museum later amending its annual report.

An independent investigation, commissioned by the city of Amsterdam, fully cleared Ruf in June 2018 from all allegations.

=== Later career ===
From 2019 to 2020, Ruf headed the international program of the Garage Museum of Contemporary Art in Moscow.

Since 2020, Ruf has been serving as director of the Hartwig Art Foundation in Amsterdam an organisation setting up a new museum of contemporary art in Amsterdam. In 2020 the Hartwig Art Foundation established the Hartwig Art Production | Collection Fund, acquiring works to be donated to the National Collection of the Netherlands.

In 2022, Ruf partnered with the Stedelijk for a major exhibition of artist Anne Imhof, which she had helped curate when the show was initially intended to open at the Garage Museum.

In 2023, Ruf curated the retrospective of Meredith Monk at Oude Kerk, Amsterdam.

In 2024, the Hartwig Art Foundation and Performa co-commissioned Julien Creuzet's Algorithm ocean true blood moves which was presented in New York and at Studio Boekman of the Dutch National Opera.

== Other activities ==
- Centre for Artistic Estates (ZKN), Member of the Advisory Board
- Garage Journal, Member of the Advisory Board on Doing Research in Art Institutions
- Mondrian Initiative, Member of the Selection Committee
- Mumok, Member of the Board of Trustees

== Recognition ==
- 2015 – Agnes Gund Curatorial Award, presented by Independent Curators International
