= Second Nature =

Second Nature may refer to:

== Albums ==
- Second Nature (Atom Heart, Tetsu Inoue and Bill Laswell album), 1994
- Second Nature (Margaret Urlich album), 1999
- Second Nature (The Young Gods album), 2000
- Second Nature (Katherine Jenkins album), 2004
- Second Nature (Flying Colors album), 2014
- Second Nature (Netsky album), 2020
- Second Nature (Lucius album), 2022

== Songs ==
- "Second Nature" (Dan Hartman song), 1985
- "Second Nature" (Rush song), 1987
- "Second Nature" (Electronic song), 1997
- "Second Nature" (Destiny's Child song), 1998

== Musical artists ==
- 2nd Nature (group), African-American contemporary R&B group
- 2nd Nature, original name of American singing group TLC
- Uwe Schmidt (born 1968), or Second Nature, German composer, musician and producer of electronic music

== Other uses ==
- Second Nature (2003 film), a 2003 TV film directed by Ben Bolt
- Second Nature (2009 film), a 2009 short film by Colin Blackshear
- Second Nature (book), a 1992 book by Michael Pollan
- Second Nature: Scenes from a World Remade, a 2021 book by Nathaniel Rich
- Second Nature Improv, a theatre troupe at the University of Southern California
- Second Nature Recordings, a record label

== See also ==
- Custom (disambiguation)
- Habit (psychology)
