= Customization =

Customization may refer to:

- Customization (anthropology), the process of cultural appropriation and creation of bespoke design
- Customization (international marketing), a country-tailored product strategy
- Mass customization, the use of computer-aided manufacturing systems to produce custom output
- Modding, a slang expression for modification of hardware, software, or other items
- Car tuning, the modification of an automobile, motor bike, scooter or moped
- Personalization, the use of technology to accommodate differences between individuals
- Custom-fit, a design term for personalization with geometric characteristics
- Bespoke, made to order. UK equivalent of US custom-made
- Custom software, software that is specially developed for some specific organization or other user.

== See also ==
- Custom (disambiguation)
- Kustom (disambiguation)
