= Blackshear =

Blackshear may refer to:

- Blackshear (surname)
- Blackshear, Georgia, city in Georgia, USA
- Lake Blackshear, lake in Georgia, USA
