= Turato =

Turato is a surname. Notable people with the surname include:

- Gessica Turato (born 1984), Italian road cyclist
- Nora Turato (born 1991), Croatian graphic designer
