= Abokado =

British fast food chain

- Abokado team at Hammersmith, UK
- Type: Private
- Industry: Fast food
- Founded: 2004
- Founders: Mark Lilley; Lindsay Lilley
- Headquarters: London, United Kingdom
- Area served: London
- Key people: Mark Lilley (CEO)
- Products: Sushi, salads, sandwiches, Coffee
- Owner: Montway Holdings Ltd
- Website: www.abokado.com

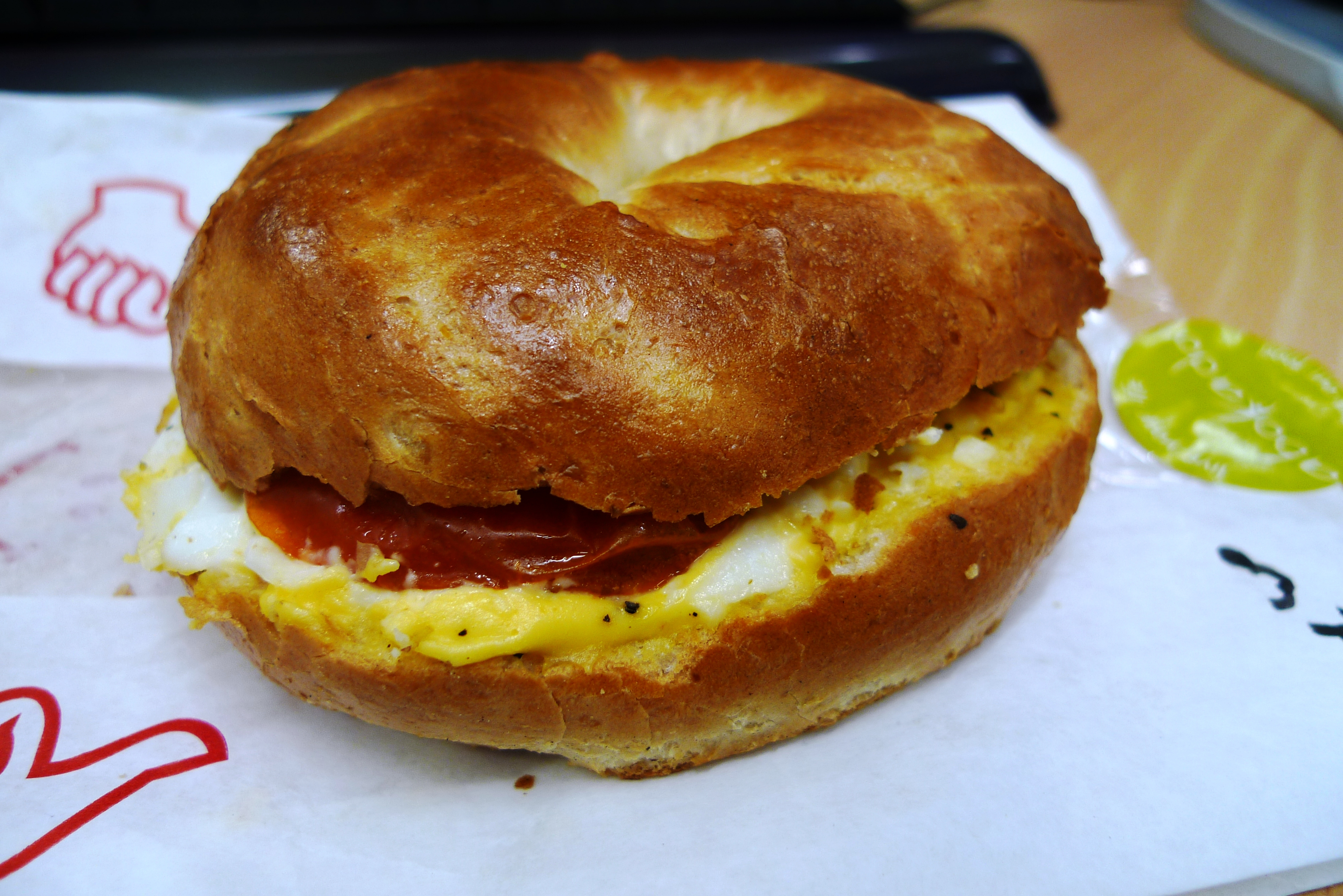
Abokado toasted bagel with scrambled eggs and roasted tomato

Abokado is a fast food chain based in the United Kingdom. It markets itself as being a fast food chain focused on sustainability and healthy eating. Abokado is known for its poke, sushi, salads, and noodle bowls and claims to be "Pacific-inspired."

== History ==
The chain was founded by Mark Lilley and his wife Lindsay in 2004, with the first store opening in London's Covent Garden.

As of September 2015, it had 26 stores in London. In September 2015, Mark Lilley, director of Abokado, announced that they would be following Jamie Oliver's example and introduce a sugar tax on sweetened drinks sold in the chain.

In 2019, the company announced it will be launching a Company Voluntary Arrangement (CVA), after having suffered a "significant sophisticated online banking fraud" in July. At present, it is unclear how many sites of the brand will be closed under the CVA.

The company was sold in a pre-pack administration in October 2020; as a result of the impact of COVID-19. Founder Mark Lilley is CEO of the new owners, Montway Holdings Ltd.

== Food ==
Abokado's food is focused on health-conscious eating, sustainability, and customizability. It offers bowls like poke, salad, and noodles that are customizable to a consumer's preferences. Although it markets itself as Pacific-inspired food, it offers a wide variety of global cuisines.

Abokado made news in 2019 for featuring edible crickets from Eat Grub as a salad topper or side on its menu. It became the first UK-based chain to have edible insects on its main menu.
