= Blackshear (surname) =

Blackshear is a surname first found in Devon, England. Notable people with the surname include:

- Colin Blackshear (born 1979), American filmmaker and multi-media artist
- David Blackshear (1764–1837), American general
- Jeff Blackshear (born 1969), former American football guard
- Kathleen Blackshear (1897–1988), American artist
- Kerry Blackshear Jr. (born 1997), American basketball player in the Israeli Basketball Premier League
- Raheem Blackshear (born 1999), American football player
- Rodney Blackshear (born 1969), former American arena football wide receiver
- Ronald Blackshear (born 1978), former American professional basketball player
- Thomas Blackshear (born 1955), African-American artist
- Wayne Blackshear (born 1992), American professional basketball player
