= Colin Blackshear =

American film director

Colin Blackshear (born; December 6, 1979) is an American filmmaker and multi-media artist. He is a film producer, director and editor.

== Early life and career ==
Blackshear was born in Berkeley, California in 1979 and currently lives in Northern California.

== Later work ==
Blackshear film director and film producer the short film "Second Nature", created for Sector 9 Skateboards. Second Nature has won several awards including "Best Extreme Sports Film" at the Mammoth Film Festival, "Best Short Film" at the X-Dance Action Sports Film Festival,"Best Sports Film" at the Sonoma International Film Festival and Best Adventure Sport film at The 5 Point Film Festival in Carbondale, Colorado. Working in collaboration with photographer and filmmaker Ari Marcopoulos, he co-created an internet video titled "Claremont" for fashion designer Adam Kimmel, and was editor on the project, "No Way Back", created for the Yves Saint Laurent. Blackshear holds a Bachelor of Fine Arts degree from California College of the Arts in Oakland/San Francisco, California in Media Arts. Blackshear has also worked with other filmmakers Caveh Zahedi, Sam Green, Daria Martin, Aaron Brown, and Rob Epstein.
