= Laura Lima =

Brazilian artist

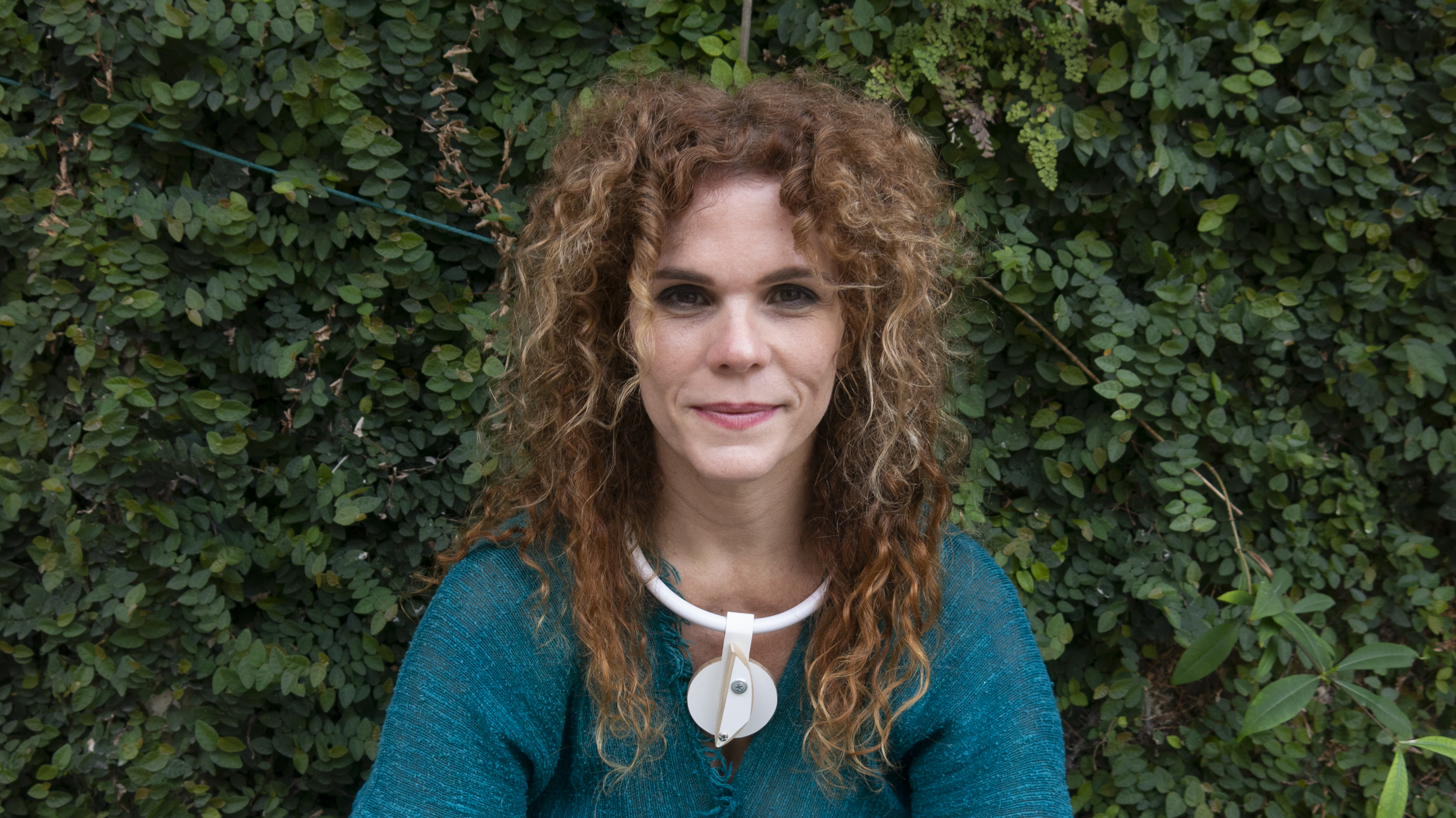
- Born: 1971 (age 54–55); Governador Valadares, Minas Gerais, Brazil
- Education: Universidade do Estado do Rio de Janeiro
- Occupation: Contemporary Artist
- Awards: Bonnefanten Award

Laura Lima (Governador Valadares, Minas Gerais, Brazil) is a contemporary Brazilian artist who lives and works in Rio de Janeiro. Since the 1990s, Lima has discussed in her works the matter of alive beings, among other topics. Her works can be found in the collections of institutions such as Bonniers Konsthall, Stockholm, Sweden; Inhotim Institute, Brumadinho, Brazil; MAM - Museum of Modern Art, São Paulo, Brazil; Migros Museum für Gegenwartskunst, Zurich, Switzerland; Pinacoteca of the State of São Paulo, Brazil; Itaú Cultural, São Paulo, Brazil; Pampulha Museum of Art, Belo Horizonte, Brazil; National Museum of Fine Arts, Rio de Janeiro, Brazil; Hammer Museum, Los Angeles, USA; MASP - Museum of Art of São Paulo, Brazil, among others.

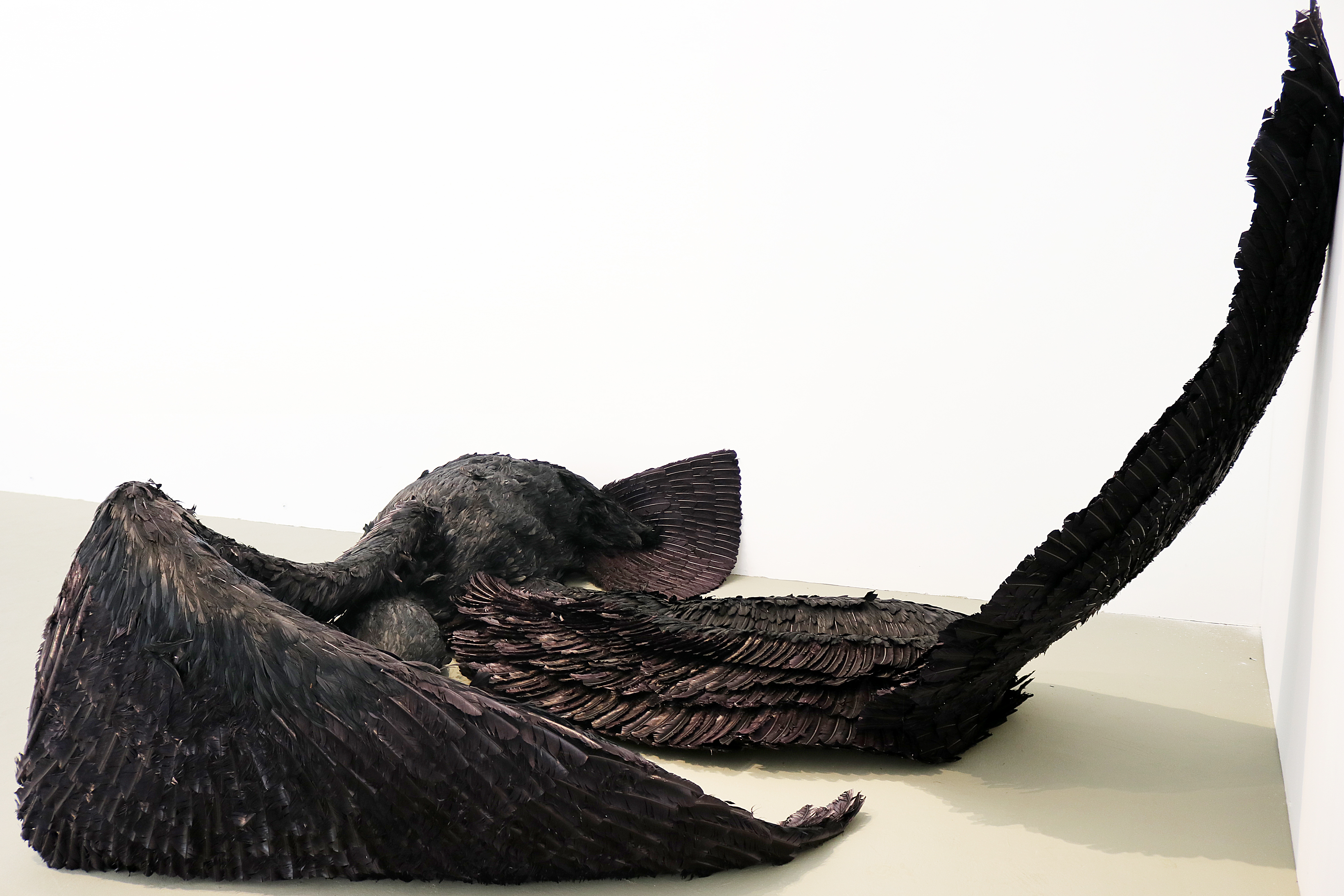
piece of her work

== Biography ==
Born in Governador Valadares, Laura Lima moved to Rio de Janeiro when she was still a teenager. Graduated in Philosophy in the State University of Rio de Janeiro (UERJ), she also studied at the School of Visual Arts at Parque Lage, Rio de Janeiro. Lima is one of the founding partners of the art gallery A Gentil Carioca and is currently represented by the galleries A Gentil Carioca (Rio de Janeiro), Galeria Luisa Strina (São Paulo) and Tanya Bonakdar Gallery (New York).

== Career ==
Laura Lima began her work in the 1990s and since then has been one of the leading artists of her generation. Her production escapes easy classification and she usually says that the works are not performances or installations, but rather attempts to visually articulate, in concrete reality, a personal glossary of concepts that the artist has been working on throughout her career. Lima is the first Brazilian artist to have authorial works acquired in the “Performance” (sic) category by a Brazilian museum, the Museu de Arte Moderna de São Paulo, in 2000.

In 1994, the artist began the production of the well-known set of works Man = flesh/Woman = flesh, dealing with the materiality of living beings as an integral part of her work. With this set, Lima establishes a complex conceptual game about the idea of performance; rejects such a definition; and launches new notions about the temporality of exhibitions of these works, in addition to new articulations about this language and that of museums and galleries. Some works from this set are Puller-landscape (M = f/W = f), Bala (M = f/W = f), Hips (M = f/W = f), Doped (M = f/W = f), etc. Thus, Lima's works tend to stretch the limits of usual concepts and classifications, based mainly on the use of living beings (''matter'': animals or human beings) in unusual circumstances, causing strangeness and controversial or provocative situations, such as in the works Gala chickens or Pheasants with food.

This is the case of The Inverse, a work that consists of an enormous braided nylon rope whose width decreases from one end to the other that crosses and winds through the exhibition space. Its finer end must be placed between the legs of a participant, who is lying down, with the rest of the body hidden by a false wall. It is up to the participant whether she wants to insert the tip into her vagina, using a finger protector, or leave it between her legs. The work is an honorable mention on the Huffpost website's list of the ten most controversial art projects of the last century, which includes works by artists such as Marcel Duchamp, Robert Mapplethorpe and Guerrilla Girls. In the exhibition The Inverse, held in 2016 at the Institute of Contemporary Art (ICA) – Miami, United States, there was controversy when a participant in the work claimed to have been led by the instructions of the work to ''self-violation''. The accusation did not proceed because, in all of Lima's works that include people, the hiring of each individual is contractually and legally accompanied, so that the participant is not forced to do anything that has not been previously agreed. The ICA went public to clarify that the museum or the artist did not pressure the participant and that the decision of what to do with the rope was up to her. Free will is an essential part of the work.

Laura Lima received in 2014 the BACA, Bonnefanten Prize for Contemporary Art, Netherlands; and, in 2007, the Marcantonio Vilaça Award. The artist was also nominated for the 2011 Francophone Prize and the 2012 Hans Nefkens Prize. In 2015, her work was commissioned for Performa 15. Lima was co-curator of the 7th Mercosul Bienalle, in 2009, with Victoria Noorthoorn and Camilo Yáñez.

A piece of her work, Sombra de Cinema (Cinema Shadow), has been described as "not filmmaking, it is perhaps reality. It is not theatre, it is not installation, maybe fiction. It is not performance."

== Awards ==
- 2014 - Bonnefanten Award
- 2012 - Nominated for the award Hans Nefkens
- 2011 - Nominated for the Francophone Award (France)
- 2010 - Carpe Diem Arte e Pesquisa Award (Portugal)
- 2010 - Nominated for the PIPA Award (Brazil)
- 2007 - Panorama da Arte Brasileira - MAM de São Paulo Award (Brazil)
- 2006 - Marcantônio Vilaça Award (Brazil)
- 1997 - Honorable mention: XXV Salão de Belo Horizonte (Brazil)

== Art exhibitions ==
=== Individual shows ===
- 2026 - The Drawing Drawing, Institute of Contemporary Arts, London, UK
- 2023 – Balé Literal, MACBA Barcelona Museum of Contemporary Art, Spain
- 2021 – 6 Feet Over, Tanya Bonakdar Gallery, Los Angeles, US
- 2020 – Réu Hell, Baile do Sarongue, Museu do Amanhã, Rio de Janeiro, Brazil
- 2019 – I hope this finds you well, Tanya Bonakdar Gallery, Nova York, US
- 2019 – Balé Literal, A Gentil Carioca, Rio de Janeiro, Brazil
- 2019 – Qual, Galeria Luisa Strina, São Paulo, Brazil
- 2018 – Cavalo Come Rei, Fundazione Prada, Milan, Italy
- 2018 – Alfaiataria, Pinacoteca, São Paulo, Brazil
- 2018 – Wrong Drawings, Goodman Gallery, Johannesburg, South Africa
- 2017 – A room and a half, CCA - Center for Contemporary Art, Ujazdowski Castle, Warsaw, Poland
- 2016 – The Inverse, ICA Miami, Miami, US
- 2015 – The Naked Magician, National Gallery of Denmark, Kopenhagen, Denmark
- 2015 – El Mago Desnudo, MAMBA - Museo de Arte Moderno de Buenos Aires, Buenos Aires, Argentina
- 2015 – Ágrafo, Galeria Luisa Strina, São Paulo, Brazil
- 2015 – Cinema Shadow n2 Segundo, Centro Cultural Banco do Nordeste, Fortaleza, Brazil
- 2015 – Cinema Shadow n2 Segundo, Teatro Margarita Xirgu, Buenos Aires, Argentina
- 2014 – The Fifth Floor, Bonnefantenmuseum, Maastricht, Netherlands
- 2014 – The Abstraction, Lilith Performance Studio, Malmo, Sweden
- 2014 – The Naked Magician, Bonniers Konsthall, Stockholm, Sweden
- 2013 – Bar Restaurant and Naked Magician, Migros Museum fur Gegenwartskunst, Zurich, Switzerland
- 2013 – Por Amor a la Disidencia, MUAC, Mexico City, Mexico
- 2013 – Song, colaboração com James Tyson e Ranters Theater, Arts House, Melbourne, Australia
- 2012 – Notas de Rodapé, A Gentil Carioca Lá, Galeria A Gentil Carioca, Rio de Janeiro, Brazil
- 2012 – Cinema Shadow n1 Unspecified, Shortwave Cinema, London, England
- 2012 – Cinema Shadow n2 Segundo, Fundação Eva Klabin, Rio de Janeiro, Brazil
- 2010 – Grande, Casa França Brasil, Rio de Janeiro, Brazil
- 2010 – Laura Lima, La Centrale, Montreal, Canada
- 2010 – Baile, Sesc, São Paulo, Brazil
- 2009 – Padedéu (with Jarbas Lopes), Galeria Luisa Strina, São Paulo, Brazil
- 2009 – Nuvem, Casa de Cultura Laura Alvim, Rio de Janeiro, Brazil
- 2008 – Fuga, A Gentil Carioca, Rio de Janeiro, Brazil
- 2007 – Ornamental Philosophy, Hardcore Art Contemporary Space, Miami, US
- 2005 – Paisagem, Museu do Estado, Recife, Brazil
- 2004 – Baile, Parque Lage, Rio de Janeiro, Brazil
- 2004 – Instâncias, Chapter Art Centre, Cardiff, Wales
- 2003 – Costumes Loja, Casa Triângulo, São Paulo, Brazil
- 2002 – Costumes, Mala Galerija, Moderna Galerija, Ljubljana, Esloveny
- 2002 – Homem = carne/Mulher = carne & Costumes, Museu de Arte da Pampulha, Belo Horizonte, Brazil
- 2000 – Project Rooms, Arco-Madrid, Madrid, Spain
- 2000 – Puxador Paisagem (H = c/M = c), Escola de Crítica, São Paulo, Brazil
- 2000 – Laura Lima a Serviço do RhR, 24 dias em Madrid, Espacio Uno and city of Madrid, Museo Reina Sofía, Madrid, Spain
