= Nikita Gale =

American visual artist (born 1983)

- Born: Nikita Gale; 1983 (age 42–43); Anchorage, Alaska, US
- Occupation: Installation artist
- Known for: Installations

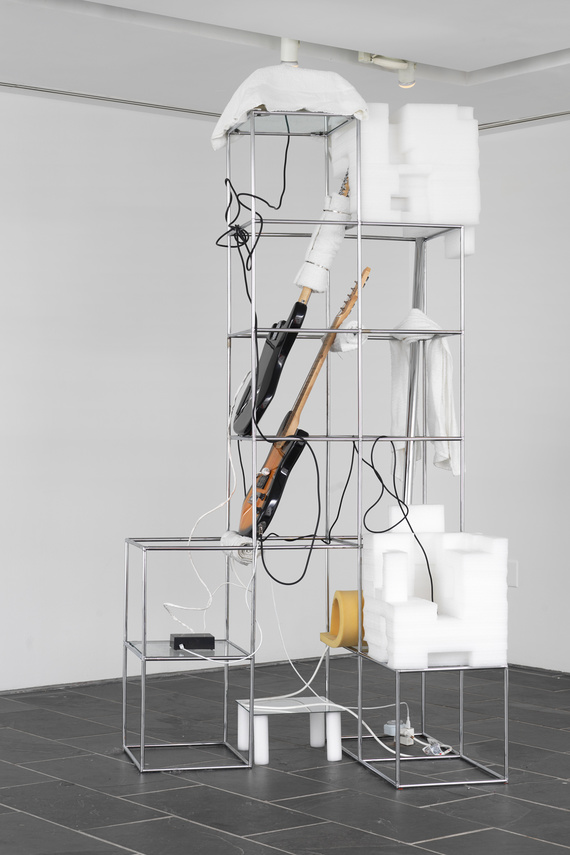
BIG BAD PICKUP, 2017. Exhibited at The Studio Museum in Harlem exhibition Fictions.

Nikita Gale (born 1983, Anchorage, Alaska) is an American visual artist based in Los Angeles, California.

== Education ==
Gale received a Bachelor of Arts (BA) in Anthropology with a focus on Archaeological Studies from Yale University in 2006 and a Master of Fine Arts degree (MFA) in New Genres from the University of California, Los Angeles in 2016.

== Career ==
In 2018, the Pérez Art Museum Miami acquired Gale's AN ABUNDANT LOSS for its permanent collection.

As of 2021, Gale has served on the Board of Directors for GREX, the West Coast affiliate of the A. K. Rice Institute for the Study of Social Systems (AKRI).

In 2022 Gale was commissioned by BMW to create new artworks for BMW Open Work at Frieze London.

== Art Practices ==
The artist's many artworks show how different elements effect each other, for example noise and visibility to configurate what is seen and by who and how those effect the final outcome. Her sculptures blur the lines to bring attention to important matters like race issues. Her works address both technology and natural life.

== Artwork ==
- US VS US Created in 2020, Nikita Gale produced US VS US. Amidst the protest of the Black Lives Matter Movement, this interactive slideshow which consists of 200 flowers, representing the killings of innocent people, and LAPD equipment gear. Gale’s artwork allows the audience to visit a web page and scroll down to view the images. In between, Gale uses June Jordan’s poem, “Letter to the Local Police,” which “satirically takes up the voice of an insipid suburban resident writing a letter to the police to level a complaint about roses” (nikitagale.com). Gale connects her work, which is about corruption and abuse towards innocent lives, with Jordan’s poem, which displays her environment as a façade to what is actually going on in the world.
- Tempo Rubato (Stolen Time) 2023-2024 Shown at the Whitney Biennial, the work consists of a modified player piano which silently replays piano performances by pop musicians. The sound of the piano keys moving is picked up, amplified and relayed through loudspeakers. Spotlights illuminate the mechanical performance. Gale says the work aims to examine how music and the labor of producing music is turned into intellectual property. By silencing the sound performance, which is protected by copyright law, the piece draws attention to the work of creating the performance which, the artist found, has a much more uncertain legal status. This unclear status deprives artists of just compensation, Gale claims.

== Exhibitions and projects ==
Solo exhibitions

- Nikita Gale: PRIVATE DANCER, California African American Museum, Los Angeles, CA, 2021
- Wild Frictions. Politische Poesien der Störung (Wild Frictions. Political poetries of disorder), Kunstraum Kreuzberg, Berlin, Germany, 2021
- IN A DREAM YOU CLIMB THE STAIRS, Chisenhale, London, UK, 2022
- TAKERS, LAXART, Los Angeles, California, 2022
- Nikita Gale: END OF SUBJECT, 52 Walker (David Zwirner), New York, NY, 2022. Curated by Ebony L. Haynes. Reviewed in Art in America.
- BENEATH TONGUES, Swiss Institute, New York, NY, 2022

Performances

- Nikita Gale, AUDIENCING, MoMA PS1, New York, NY, 2020
- Performa 23, Performa, New York, NY

Group exhibitions

- Fictions, The Studio Museum in Harlem, New York, NY, 2017-2018
- Made in L.A. 2018, Hammer Museum, Los Angeles, CA, 2018
- Whitney Biennial 2024, The Whitney Museum of American Art, New York, NY, 2024
