= Two Seasons =

Two Seasons is an online and physical retailer of skateboard, surf and snow sports shops in the UK, selling clothing and equipment for the related sports. The company was established in 1983 by Stuart Roberts. The first store was on the Wellingborough Road in Northampton, England and more than twenty stores followed. In 2008, when there were thirteen stores, Two Seasons was bought by and merged with Billabong Clothing, but Roberts remained with the company throughout.

In August 2020 Board Riders put the parent company of Two Seasons into administration after the COVID lockdown forced all retail stores to close. The original founder of Two Seasons, Stuart Roberts, along with 2 other investors bought the brand back and set up a new company called 2S Seasons Holdings. Later in 2020, the Nottingham store reopened and others followed.
