= Narcissister =

American feminist performance artist

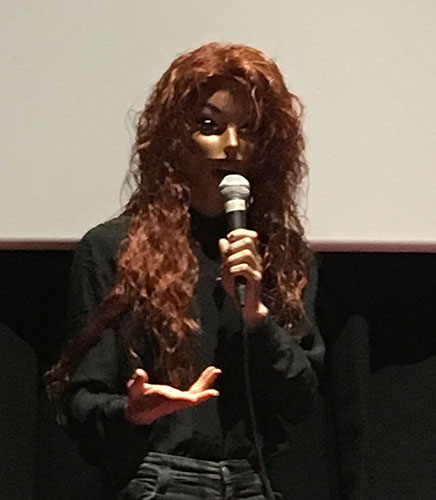
Narcissister speaking at a talk back following a screening of her film Narcissister Organ Player

Narcissister is an American, Brooklyn-based, feminist performance artist, born of Moroccan Jewish and African-American descent. Narcissister's work tends to focus on race, gender, and sexuality, using her slight anonymity to explore such topics controversially. In February 2013, she headlined her first solo gallery. She was a contestant on America's Got Talent in 2011. The Huffington Post declared her the "topless feminist superhero of New York". She prefers her identity remain secret.

== Art and performance ==
Narcissister studied dance at Alvin Ailey American Dance Theater in New York City before turning that skill into a more interdisciplinary performance. She then worked as a window stylist and designer while completing the Whitney Independent Study Program and performing at burlesque shows around New York. Most of her work tends to be very sexualized and sexually charged, dealing mostly with women and female sexuality with reoccurring uses of a merkin and items being held in bodily orifices. She has been known for bridging the gap between past and present feminist art. She has acknowledged previous inspirations like Adrian Piper, Marina Abramović, and Carolee Schneemann; however, her work seeks to use humor, irony, and sex beyond a singular political stance.

Her name comes from the combination of "narcissist" and "sister", exercising the language of racial and gender identity as well as self-loving absorption. It alludes to the work she produces, work that lies in the intersection of gender, race, and radical self-acceptance. Her background in African American dance, training in Black feminist arts, and her exhibitions consisting solely of African artists shows her extensive admiration and appreciation for Black bodies.

=== Narcissister in the mainstream ===
In 2011, Narcissister was picked as one of the 30 young artists to recreate the various pieces—specifically the Luminosity piece—from the Marina Abramović retrospective The Artist is Present performance piece at MoMA. These pieces were all recreations of past pieces done by Abramovic throughout her career. In 2011, Narcissister was also asked to be the date of and accompany goth singer Marilyn Manson to various events in California surrounding the screening of his film Born Villain. She currently holds a residency at the downtown club and performance venue The Box Soho.

=== Work and collaborations ===
==== The Beginning - 2014 ====
Narcisisster's use of masks and mannequins was initiated in her first public performance, called The Mannequin. However, according to her that's the only consistent element in her work, explaining how its continuously evolving adding so many layers. Her most notable works include I'm Every Woman, a piece named after the song by Chaka Khan, in which she coined the term "reverse strip tease," by pulling clothing out of her bodily orifices and getting dressed that way. She performed this piece at Montreal's Edgy Women festival in 2011. Narcissister is also well known for her 2008 film The Self-Gratifier, a piece in which she constructs an abstract bicycle machine, connecting it to whips that whip the body as the machine is being used. The Self-Gratifier won the Best Use of a Sex Toy award at the Good Vibrations Erotic Film Festival that same year. Burka Barbie consists of an elaborate dance routine fantasy sequence and Hot Dog consists of her emerging as a wiener from a hot dog bun. Most recently she worked on a movement about women's top freedom in NYC, consisting of up to 30 women, all wearing the classic Narcissister mask walking around in their daily lives topless. This piece ended with an outside viewing of the videos at a Newsstand on Canal Street, a gallery space called Petrella’s Imports. Another more recent work of hers is Organ Player, a full length cabaret piece in which Narcissister embodies multiple parts of the body, including but not limited to the hand, the breasts, the mouth, and the vagina. Her piece Winter/Spring Collection was a collaboration with A.L. Steiner for MOCAtv.

She held an exhibition in New York in 2013 called Narcissister is You. The exhibit showed her unedited video project where willing participants were invited to step behind her famous mask and explore her artistic process in their own way, highlighting Freud's two types of narcissism "primary" and "secondary". This exhibit included a sculpture installation as well, which invited spectators to identify with her image presented in the mirror. While attempting to get viewers to identify what it is in the "self" image that gets us to fall in love with it, it also beckons the question how can such beauty be admired in an artificially constructed subject.

As a side project, Narcissister also collaborates musically with the electronic and noise musician EarthMasters, and their first 10-track album, Subliminal Weight Loss, was released in October 2014.

==== 2015 - Present ====
In Marilyn (2016), Narcissister enacts a reverse strip tease by gradually dressing herself through garments pulled out of her vagina; ultimately, dressing identical to the original Hollywood blonde bombshell. The performance illustrates many of the defining concerns of her practice, of femininity and beauty, glamour and artifice. Two years later, she had a solo art exhibit at PARTICIPANT INC. Studies for Participatory Sculptures, which involved over two hundred collages, sculptures, and a large totemic sculpture that was central to the exhibit. Through this work, the pornographic nature of them serve to both accept and refuse the historical representation of the feminine in art and pornography. For the Performa 17 biennial, Narcissister presented a collection of videos and performances titled The Body is a House. Then in 2019, she premiered a short film, Breast Work, at the Sundance Film Festival. By showing her breast in public, Narcissister is able to explore how restrictions on "female toplessness are grounded in fear of, and desire to control, the female body."

== Awards and honors ==
Narcissister won a Bessie Award in 2013 for her project Organ Player. Two years later, she won a Creative Capital grant for the same project. She was also a recipient of the Theo Westenberger Grant.

== Literature ==
Ariel Osterweis (2015): Public Pubic: Narcissister's Performance of Race, Disavowal, and Aspiration. In: The Drama Review, Volume 59, Number 4, Winter 2015, pp. 101–116.
Sylvia Sadzinski (2017): Narcissister is You: radikaler Narzissmus, Kollektivität und das posthumane Subjekt. In: Änne Söll, Linda Hentschel (Ed.): kritische berichte 4.2016. Gend_r. Jonas Verlag.
