= Wanda Raimundi-Ortiz =

American interdisciplinary artist

Wanda Raimundi
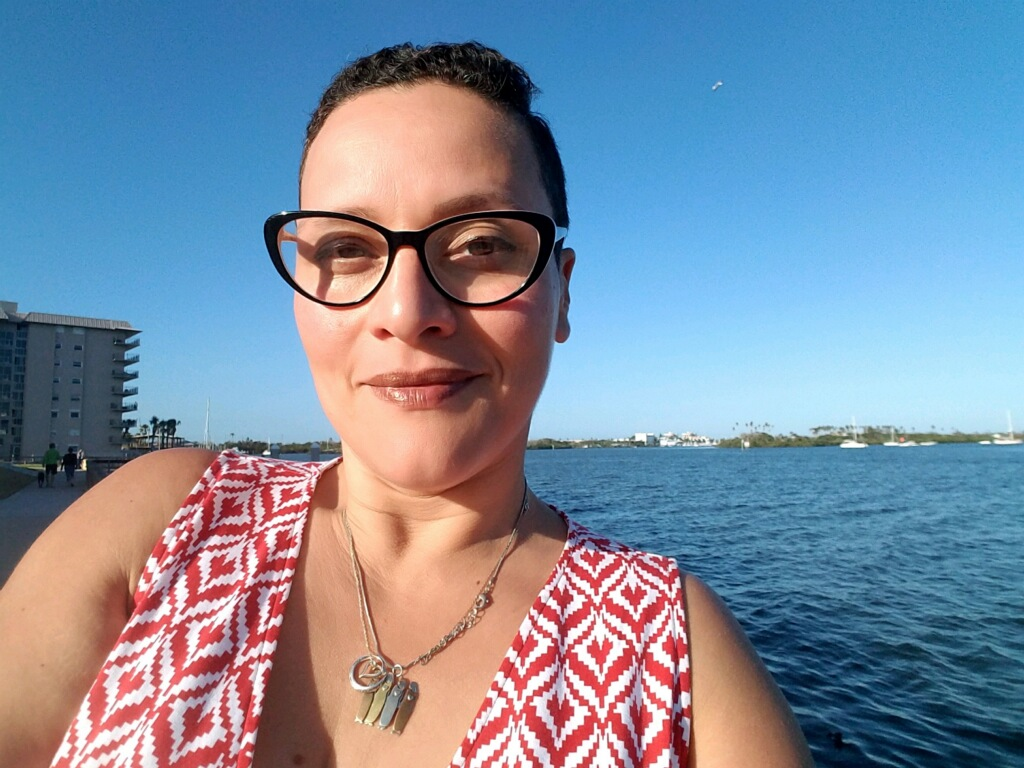
- Born: 1973 (age 52–53); The Bronx, NY
- Education: Fashion Institute of Technology, Rutgers University
- Website: http://wandaraimundi-ortiz.com/

Wanda Raimundi-Ortiz (born 1973), is an American interdisciplinary artist of Puerto Rican descent born in The Bronx, NY and based in Orlando, FL.

== Early life and education ==
Raimundi-Ortiz was born to Puerto Rican immigrant parents near the Bronx River Projects. Growing up she was known as a bookworm, "artsy," "the new wave chick," "wanna-be white," and "from the 'hood" until graduating from the arts-target high school that she attended. That intersectionality grew to be reflected in the concepts she works with in her artwork. She graduated from Fashion Institute of Technology in 1995 with an associate degree in illustration. In 2002 she was an artist in residence at Skowhegan School of Painting and Sculpture. In 2005 she participated in Bronx AIM, a program that exposes and educates emerging artists. She earned her MFA in 2008 from Mason Gross School of Art at Rutgers University.

== Career ==
Raimundi-Ortiz's early work often examined pop, hip-hop and comic culture, depicting famous people (like Celia Cruz) or her own epic characters (like Wepa Woman and Chuleta) in mural form. But her most notable work is multi-disciplinary or performance-based such as RicanStruction that was featured in Performa '05 Biennial creating a pop-up stereotypically Nuyorican beauty parlor. Another of her more interactive performance works was featured in "The Post Millennial Black Madonna," an exhibition at Museum of Contemporary African Diasporan Arts in 2007. In 2011 Raimundi-Ortiz performed her Hush series in New York City and at Gyeongnam Art Museum in South Korea. In response to the Pulse shooting, she held a calavera making workshop in Orlando that culminated in a Dia de los Muertos ofrenda. This shrine was exhibited in the National Museum of Mexican Art in Chicago in 2016. Raimundi-Ortiz had work in Silos, an exhibition at American University in 2016. She was a 2016-17 recipient of a Franklin Furnace Fund. Raimundi-Ortiz is a professor at University of Central Florida.

=== Ask Chuleta ===
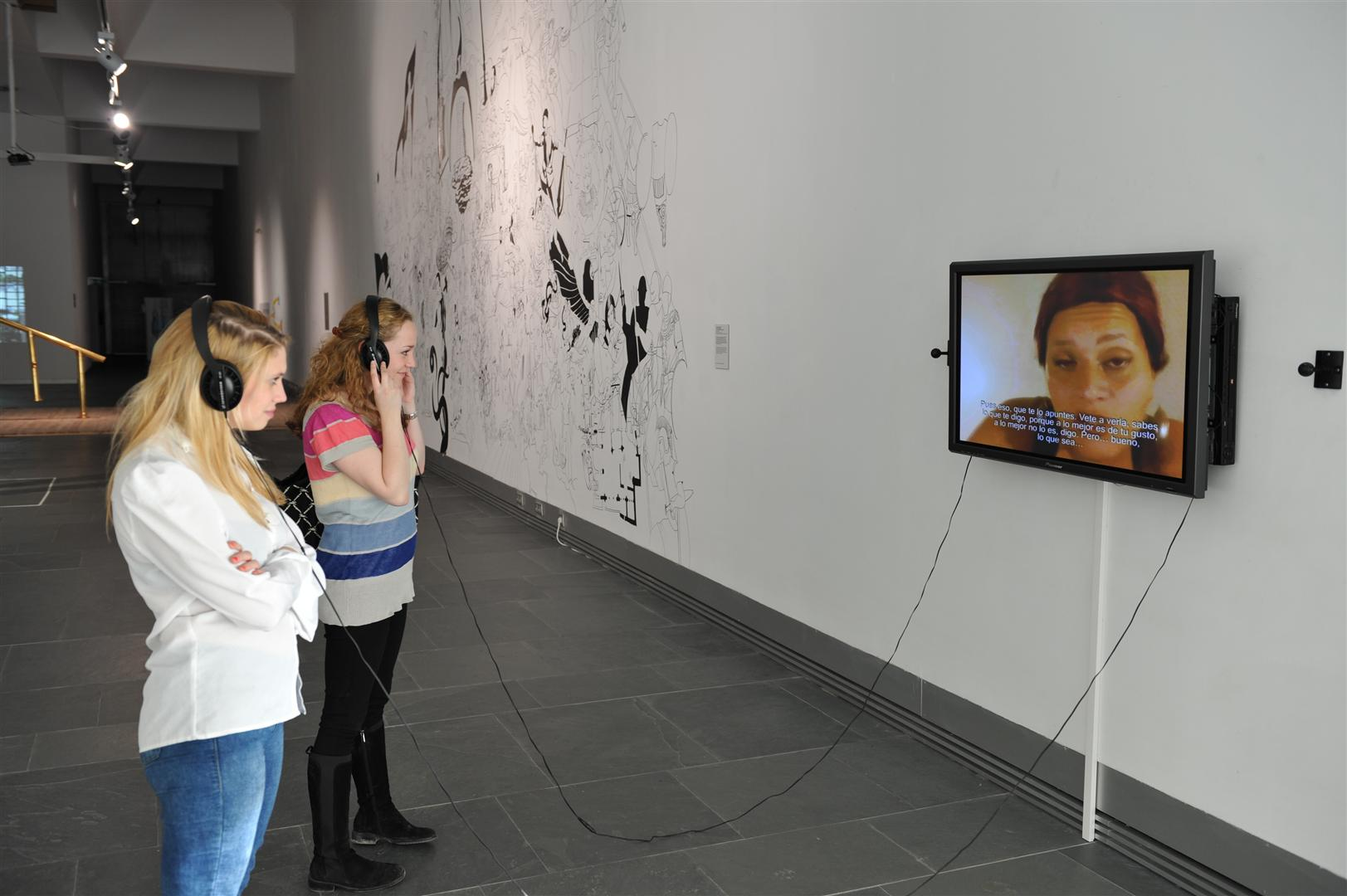
Wanda Raimundi-Ortiz Ask Chuleta, Biennial Culture, 2010 02

Raimundi-Ortiz's performative and political web series, Ask Chuleta, premiered in 2009. This series consists of short YouTube videos where her comical yet poignant Bronx-based Latina, doobie-wearing character, Chuleta, demystifies and critiques contemporary art and its context. She unpacks identity politics, access and stereotypes through this character. Some of the themes of these videos include, color field painting, post-modernism, Pollock and Kahlo, and Abstract Expressionism and the "white cube". Art critic Benjamin Genocchio says, "It is like a cross between Robert Hughes’s TV series “The Shock of the New” and a novel by Oscar Hijuelos." This work was shown at the Jersey City Museum, amongst other places.

=== Reinas ===
In Raimundi-Ortiz's Reinas series, she explores the archetypical queen character by developing her own version, adorned in invented regalia inspired by personal fears and challenges including "Garbage Queen." This series consisting mostly of performance ephemera and photographic portraits was exhibited in New Jersey at The Gateway Project as part of (em) POWER DYNAMICS: Exploring the Modes of Female Empowerment and Representation in America.

=== Pietà ===
Raimundi-Ortiz's performance series Pietà centers around the concept of radical empathy. In these performances she embodies a character in the place of Michelangelo's Mary, but instead of holding the dying Jesus, she invites the public, one at a time, to be embraced by her in his place. She created this work to offer an exchange of mourning in response to contemporary global strife and identity-based violence. Through touch, she wants to reach empathy. The first iteration of this performance took place in Knowles Chapel at Rollins College in 2017 where she held thirty-three visitors who identified as part of marginalized communities, each for thirty-three seconds. For this first iteration she collaborated with the University of Central Florida gospel choir, designer Kristina Tollefson and local dj, DJ Stereo 77 to enrich the experience. For the second iteration of her Pietà, Raimundi-Ortiz exhibited at The National Portrait Gallery in Washington DC later the same year, hosting Howard Gospel Choir, costume design by Kristina Tollefson and DJ Stereo 77 as her soundtrack.
