= Julien Creuzet =

French artist

- Born: 1986 (age 39–40); Paris, France
- Occupation: Artist

Julien Creuzet (born 1986) is a French-Caribbean conceptual artist and professor at the Ecole des Beaux-Arts de Paris. Creuzet's practice encompasses sculpture, poetry, music, video, and animation and often engages with topics of creolization, migration decolonization, and the complexities of French colonial history. In 2021, Creuzet was nominated for the Prix Marcel Duchamp, and in 2022, he received Art Basel's Donnés Prize. In 2023, Creuzet was co-commissioned by Performa and the Hartwig Art Foundation. In 2024, Creuzet represented France at the 60th Venice Biennale, becoming the first black man, and one of the youngest artists, to do so.

== Early life and education ==
Creuzet was born in the eastern Parisian suburb Le Blanc Mesnil. He and his family moved to Martinique when he was 4 years old. While living in Martinique, Creuzet was exposed to Caribbean culture and artists by his father, an assistant nurse who loved art and cultural exhibitions. In 2006, at the age of 20, Creuzet returned to France to pursue studies at French art schools.

== Work ==
Creuzet's work is known for retracing African ancestry and commenting on French colonial history using digital avatars and the culture of the Caribbean. His work is biographical, personal, and political often incorporating performative aspects and music/song alongside his sculptural works thereby creating a complex montage in his exhibitions. He's known to incorporate poetry and story throughout his work and is influenced by iterary figures such as Aimé Césaire and Édouard Glissant.Creuzet also cites Wifredo Lam et Miles Davis as influencing his work.

In a notable solo show at the Parisian gallery High Art, Creuzet incorporated a historic newspaper article published in 1976 in Le Monde about a story describing a Parisian dinner at which white attendees were served by Black "boys and girls," the event being described as "the only voodoo temple in Europe" as a point of reference for exoticism prevalent throughout France's colonial history.

In the same Paris show, mixed media works of large blacks heads crafted out of raffia bags were accompanied by Creole singing and beating rhythms. Additional sculptural / mixed media works included cloud-like circles crafted from breads and thread, and suspended sculptural forms filled with rice, beans, and other grains.

Creuzet is currently a professor at the Ecole des Beaux-Arts de Paris holding the title "Chef d'atelier." He lives and works in Montreuil, a commune east of Paris.

=== Artistic process ===
Creuzet, during an interview with Artnet, mentions that some of his sculptures take several years to evolve, and often start as experiments and ideas that need time to come to their full realization. He considers the works fully formed and complete when the "sculpture escapes [him]" and he no longer feels like the sole author of the object.

=== Notable exhibitions include ===
- La Biennale di Venezia (2024)
- CNAC Grenoble (2023-2024)
- Performa 23 (2023)
- Palais de Tokyo in Paris (2019)—Solo
- Camden Arts Center in London (2022)—Solo
- Manifesta 13 (2020)
- Gwangju Biennale (2018)
- Lyon Biennale (2017)
