= Candida Gertler =

British-German art collector (born 1966/67)

- Born: 1966 or 1967 (age 58–59); Frankfurt am Main, Germany
- Occupation: Art collector
- Spouse: Zak Gertler
- Children: 2

Candida Gertler (born 1966/1967) OBE is a British/German art collector, philanthropist, and former journalist.

== Early life ==
She was born in Frankfurt am Main, Germany, to Romanian Jewish immigrant parents. She studied journalism and law.

== Career ==
In 2003 Gertler co-founded the art philanthropy organisation Outset Contemporary Art Fund.

In June 2015, she was given an OBE "for services to Contemporary Visual Arts and Arts Philanthropy".

She is a member of the Tate International Council.

In 2024, Gertler became the target of protests and calls for her removal from voluntary arts roles following scrutiny of her philanthropic connections. She and her husband, Zak Gertler, have been publicly identified as having close ties to Israeli political figures and pro-Israel philanthropy; media reports state that the couple hosted Israeli Prime Minister Benjamin Netanyahu’s 70th birthday celebration at their home in Tel Aviv."Goldsmiths CCA announces closure following pro-Palestinian activist occupation". Artnet News. 25 November 2024.

In November 2024, more than 1,100 artists and art workers signed an open letter calling on major UK institutions such as Tate to cut ties with the charity Outset Contemporary Art Fund, which Gertler co-founded, citing what they described as its “complicity” with the Israeli government."Over 1,100 artists call on UK museums to cut ties with Outset Contemporary Art Fund". The Art Newspaper. 29 November 2024.

Following protests and an occupation of the Goldsmiths Centre for Contemporary Art (CCA) by the activist group Goldsmiths for Palestine, the institution removed the Gertlers’ names from a donor gallery and donor board later that month."Pro-Palestine boycott of Goldsmiths CCA ends after gallery cuts ties with donors". The Art Newspaper. 25 November 2024.

In November 2024, she announced she would be stepping down from all her voluntary positions in UK art institutions.

== Personal life ==
She is married to Zak Gertler. They are Jewish, and have two children.

He has been called "one of London's leading property developers". In 2009, Zak Gertler and family had an estimated net worth of £150 million, down from £250 million in 2008. "The Gertlers developed offices in Germany, moving into the London market in the 1990s."
