= T. Gertler =

American novelist and freelance writer (born 1946)

A copy of Gertler's novel.

Trudy Gertler (born 1946) is an American novelist and freelance writer.

Born in New York City, she is the author of several short stories and the screenplay for the film Convention Girls (1978). She has written one novel, Elbowing the Seducer, which was published in 1984. As a writer, she uses only the initial letter of her given name (Trudy), because she does not want to be "prejudged by gender". The novel's reissue uses the nom de plume Wyatt Harlan.

Gertler has also contributed to several prominent publications such as Esquire, Rolling Stone, and New York Woman. Her short story "In Case of Survival" was chosen for publication in The Best American Short Stories and The O. Henry Prize Stories in 1980.

Gertler is a member of the Writers Guild of America, the Authors Guild, and P.E.N.

== Sources ==
- Contemporary Authors Online, Gale, 2009. Reproduced in Biography Resource Center. Farmington Hills, Mich.: Gale, 2009.
- 1984 interview with T. Gertler by Don Swaim at Wired for Books
