= Kustom (footwear) =

Australian footwear brand

- Industry: Retail
- Founded: Gold Coast, Queensland, Australia (2005; 21 years ago)
- Headquarters: Burleigh Heads, Queensland, Australia
- Products: Apparel, sporting goods
- Website: www.kustomfootwear.com.au

Kustom is from the Gold Coast, Queensland, and is a subsidiary of Australian surfing brand Billabong International and specializes in footwear for surfing, skateboarding, and snowboarding.

On February 2, 2025, Liberated Brands, who licensed the Kustom brand, filed for Chapter 11 bankruptcy protection, listing assets and liabilities between $100 million and $500 million.
