= Kustom =

Kustom may refer to:

- Kustom (cars), a particular style of custom car, popularised in the 1950s
- Kustom Amplification, a manufacturer of guitar equipment
- Kustom (footwear), a brand of Billabong
- Kustom Kulture
- Kustom, a 2024 album by Lit Killah
