= Zak Gertler =

British-German property developer (born 1955/56)

- Born: 1955 or 1956 (age 70–71)
- Occupation: Property developer
- Spouse: Candida Gertler
- Children: 2

Zachariasz "Zak" Gertler (born 1955/1956) is a British/German property developer.

== Early life ==
Gertler is the son of Moritz Gertler, a German real estate magnate and Miriam Gertler (née Goldberg). He has a sister Idessa Trink, who is married to Emmanuel Trink.

== Career ==
He has been called "one of London's leading property developers", and "one of Germany's wealthiest property owners". In 2009, Zak Gertler and family had an estimated net worth of £150 million, down from £250 million in 2008. "The Gertlers developed offices in Germany, moving into the London market in the 1990s."

Their family owned company Gertler Estates has developed and managed property in the Frankfurt region for over 50 years. The company was founded by his father Moritz Gertler, who was a major developer in Frankfurt, especially office blocks in the Eschborn area from 1968 onwards. He is a managing director of the company.

== Personal life ==
He is married to Candida Gertler, an art collector and co-founder of Outset Contemporary Art Fund. They are Jewish, and have two children. Gertler is a close friend of Israeli Prime Minister Benjamin Netanyahu, and hosted the latter's 70th birthday at his home.
