= Second Nature (2009 film) =

- Directed by: Colin Blackshear; Ari Marcopoulos
- Produced by: Colin Blackshear; Noah Sakamoto; Patrick Rizzo
- Starring: Noah Sakamoto; Patrick Rizzo; J.M. Duran
- Music by: Nathaniel Aslaksen; Chris Vibberts; Quinn McCarthy; Dru Down
- Distributed by: Sector 9 Skateboards
- Release date: 2009
- Running time: 22 minutes
- Country: United States
- Language: English

Second Nature is a short film about skateboarding created for Sector 9 Skateboards.

== Plot summary ==
In an exploration of the abstract and the extreme, Second Nature is an examination of the natural boundaries of the human body. Noah Sakamoto, Patrick Rizzo and J.M. Duran star as the test subjects as they wield skateboards and blue suits to race down the roads of the High Sierras in California.

== Awards and honors ==
Second Nature has won several awards including "Best Extreme Sports Film" at the Mammoth Film Festival, "Best Short Film" at the X-Dance Action Sports Film Festival, and "Best Sports Film" at the Sonoma International Film Festival and Best Adventure Sport Film at the 5 Point Film Festival.
