= Custom =

Custom, customary, or consuetudinary may refer to:

== Traditions, laws, and religion ==
- Convention (norm), a set of agreed, stipulated or generally accepted rules, norms, standards or criteria, often taking the form of a custom
- Mores, what is widely observed in a particular culture, considered to be practiced by persons of good moral character
- Social norm, a rule that is socially enforced
- Tradition
- Customary law or consuetudinary, laws and regulations established by common practice
- Customary (liturgy) or consuetudinary, a Christian liturgical book describing the adaptation of rites and rules for a particular context
- Custom (Catholic canon law), an unwritten law established by repeated practice
- Customary international law, an aspect of international law involving the principle of custom
- Minhag (pl. minhagim), Jewish customs
- ʿUrf (Arabic: العرف), the customs of a given society or culture

== Import and export ==
- Customs, a tariff on imported or exported goods
- Custom house

== Modification ==
- Modding
- Bespoke, anything commissioned to a particular specification
- Custom car
- Kustom (cars)
- Custom motorcycle

== Brands, titles, and proper names ==
- Custom (guitar), a model of guitar made by Fender
- Custom (musician), stage name for New York–based musician Duane Lavold
- Customs (TV series), an Irish television series that focuses on the daily lives of customs officers
- Kimber Custom, a type of pistol
- Customs (album), a 1989 album by Savage Republic

== See also ==
- Customs officer
- Kustom (disambiguation)
