= Nora Turato =

Croatian artist

- Born: 1991 (age 34–35); Zagreb, Croatia
- Education: Gerrit Rietveld Academy, ArtEZ University of Arts
- Occupations: Graphic designer, installation artist, performance artist

Nora Turato (born 1991) is a Croatian graphic designer, installation and performance artist, based in Amsterdam. She is known for her works around everyday linguistic usage which are then enlarged and imprinted onto exhibition walls. Turato's scripts are composed of texts appropriated from Facebook, internet forums, print media and literature.

== Career ==
Turato was born in Zagreb, Croatia and moved to Amsterdam in 2009. She studied at the Gerrit Rietveld Academy in Amsterdam from 2009 till 2013 and at the Typography Workplace (part of ArtEZ University of Arts) from 2014 till 2016. She also studied at the Residency at Rijksakademie van Beeldende Kunsten van Amsterdam from 2017 till 2019. Her work has been included in various exhibitions.

== Work ==
what is dead may never die is a spoken-word performance piece hosted at the Stedelijk Museum in Amsterdam from the 28th to the 31st of October 2021. The spoken-word performance consists of a rehearsed script that Turato performs with changing rhythm and tonality. The script reflects on the year 2021 and repeats phrases coined in contemporary culture, ranging from political statements to the Kardashians.

pool 5 combines bookmaking and performance and assembles pools of text into a script, performed by Turato. Themes range from entertainment to politics to sex. The work is composed of five books presenting texts without order or logic. The artist sees the pools as “annual reports” as stated in an interview with Ana Janevski of Museum of Modern Art (MOMA). pool 5 is an expansion of pool 4, which was delayed due to the COVID-19 pandemic.

ri-mEm-buhr THuh mUHn-ee was an art piece that Turato performed in the Secession Building in Vienna in 2021 - 2022. For this piece, Turato produced a new sound installation formed from her research done on the politics of accents and Western media. Her upbringing in the shadow of the Soviet era, in which Western media was consumed in large numbers but the phonetics, nuance and meaning were often lost in translation. The audio consists of Turato mimicking the sound of Western accents, compulsively trying to get the right tone and articulation. The sound installation was exhibited at the Secession building from November 20, 2021, till February 20, 2022.

== Exhibitions ==
Nora Turato's work has been featured in various exhibitions among which:

=== Solo exhibitions ===
- 2016 Forgive And Forget, But Get It, Cosmos Carl, online
- 2017 Opening Night, Juliette Jongma, Amsterdam
- 2018 Pool 2, UKS, Oslo
- 2019 Someone oughta tell you what it’s really all about, Serralves Museum of Contemporary Art, Porto
- 2020 wow this huge wooden horse is great!, Galerie Gregor Staiger at CFA, Milan
- 2021 ri-mEm-buhr THuh mUHn-ee, Secession, Vienna
- 2022 Pool 5, Studio Now, The Museum of Modern Art, New York

=== Group exhibitions ===
- 2014 SOY DISSEMINATED, Kazachenko's Apartment, duo show with Rebecca Stephany, Oslo
- 2015 No Time To Hang, Mattkissing Project Space, Amsterdam
- 2016 Open Shelf, Museum of Contemporary Art, Denver
- 2017 Screen Present Tense, HDLU, Zagreb
- 2018 Gallery Share, LambdaLambdaLambda hosted by Hannah Hoffman Gallery, Los Angeles
- 2019 Wege zur Welt - Hildebrand Collection, G2 Kunsthalle, Leipzig
- 2020 Image Power, Frans Hals Museum, Haarlem
- 2021 Wild Frictions, Contemporary Arts Center, Cincinnati
- 2022 Word Work, Kunsthaus Hamburg, Hamburg

== Performances ==
- 2013 Theater Bellevue, in collaboration with Gerrit Rietveld Academy, Amsterdam Lost Property, Amsterdam
- 2014 Qu’est-ce que c’est, Paradiso, Amsterdam
- 2015 Bold Tendencies, Ariel 2.0, London
- 2016 25th Anniversary of KW Institute for Contemporary Art, Berlin
- 2017 Not Fair with LambdaLambdaLambda, Warsaw
- 2018 Fri Art Centre d’Art Fribourg, Fribourg
- 2019 Essere Parte - Being Part Of, Palazzo Stampa, Bergamo
- 2020 MOVEABLE TYPES, Witte de With, Rotterdam
- 2021 what is dead may never die, BASEMENT ROMA, Rome
- 2022 Slavs and Tatars: Pickle Bar, Wiener Festwochen, Vienna
- 2023 Cue The Sun, Performa 23, New York

== Publications ==
- 2017 pool #1 artist book
- 2018 pool #2 artist book
- 2019 pool #3 artist book
- 2020 pool #4 artist book
- 2022 pool #5 artist book
