= Jesper Just =

Danish artist (born 1974)

Jesper Just (born 12 June 1974) is a Danish artist, who lives and works in New York. From 1997 to 2003, he studied at the Royal Danish Academy of Fine Arts.

He has work in museums including the Guggenheim Museum in New York, Tate Modern in London and the Museum of Modern Art in New York.

Just has also created live performance participating in the Performa Biennials. He presented his opera True Love is Yet to Come in which Norwegian actor Baard Owe performed alongside projections for Performa 05, the first edition of the performance festival. 10 years later, Just presented In the shadow /of a spectacle/ is the view of the crowd at Performa 15.

== Films ==
His film trilogy A Voyage in Dwelling (2008) included performances by Benedikte Hansen, and music composed by Dorit Chrysler.

In 2013 he represented Denmark at the 55th Venice Biennale with Intercourses, a five-channel film installation in the Danish Pavilion.

== Exhibitions ==
- A Fine Romance, Midway Contemporary Art, St. Paul (2004)
- Something to Love, Herning Kunstmuseum, Herning, Denmark (2005) and Moderna Museet, Stockholm, Sweden (2006)
- Black Box, Hirshhorn Museum, Washington, DC (2006)
- Something To Love, Stedelijk Museum, Amsterdam, the Netherlands (2006)
- Jesper Just, Miami Art Museum, Miami, (2007) and touring Kunsthuis Witte de With in Rotterdam, Ursula Blickle Foundation in Kraichtal, Germany, and the Stedelijk Museum voor Actuele Kunst in Ghent, Belgium (2007)
- It Will All End in Tears, La Casa Encendida, Madrid, (2008)
- Romantic Delusions, Brooklyn Museum, Brooklyn (2008/2009)
- Intercourses, Danish Pavilion, 55th International Art Exhibition of la Biennale di Venezia (2013)
- INTERFEARS, Musée d'art contemporain de Lyon, Lyon, France (2023)

== Reception ==
In 2006 a New York Times reviewer described It Will All End in Tears as "... a beautiful spectacle that dazzles as it happens and then fades away like a puff of smoke". In 2008 a different New York Times reviewer described him as a "... still young, abundantly talented and wonderfully original artist".

He received second prize in the Carnegie Art Award at Kópavogur Arts Museum in Reykjavík in 2008, and the Eckersberg Medal in 2014.
