= Daria Martin =

American artist and filmmaker

Daria Martin (born 1973) is a contemporary American artist and filmmaker based in London since 2002. Working primarily in 16mm film, her work has been exhibited in twenty four solo shows in public galleries including at the Barbican, The New Museum, and Australian Centre for Contemporary Art and group projects such as Performa 07. According to Martin, her films address the space between disparate states of being – levels of consciousness, internal and social worlds; subject and object. Martin's films also often explore the differences and similarities between other artistic mediums including painting, performance, dance, and sculpture.

== Biography ==
Daria Martin was born in San Francisco, CA. Martin earned a BA in Humanities from Yale University (1995), and an MFA in Art from UCLA (2000). Martin's artistic journey began with abstract paintings, which she describes as "formal and strict." She was drawn to film as she found it gave her the freedom to explore. Martin's first films drew inspiration from a range of early twentieth-century artists and choreographers such as Oskar Schlemmer, Varvara Stepanova, Alexander Rodchenko. Her films are created organically, often taking on a collaborative process.

== Films ==
- In the Palace (2000)
- Birds (2001)
- Closeup Gallery (2003)
- Soft Materials (2004)
- Loneliness and the Modern Pentathlon (2004-2005)
- Wintergarden (2005)
- Harpstrings and Lava (2007)
- Minotaur (2008)
- One of the Things that Makes Me Doubt (2010-2011)
- Sensorium Tests (2012)
- At the Threshold (2014–15)
- Theatre of the Tender (2016)
- A Hunger Artist (2017)
- Tonight the World (2019)
- Nostalgia Ranch (2021)
- Grand Attack (2022)

== Collections ==
Martin's work is in the collections of the Tate, London, the New Museum, New York, the Whitney Museum of American Art, New York, the Museum of Contemporary Art, Chicago, The Hammer Museum, Los Angeles, Arts Council England, London, Kadist Art Foundation, Paris, and Ringier, Zurich.

== Awards and residencies ==
- 2018 - Winner of the 2018 Jarman Award
- 2016 - Wellcome Trust Arts Award, London Arts Council Grant for The Arts Oxford
- 2014 - AHRC Mid Career Fellowship London
- 2012 - Leverhulme Network Award, The Leverhulme Trust, London.
- 2010 - Wellcome Trust Arts Award, London.
- 2009 - Philip Leverhulme Prize, The Leverhume Trust, London.
- 2008 - Wellcome Trust Arts Award, London.
- 2008 - Artist in residence, Headlands Center for the Arts, San Francisco.
- 2007 - Artist in residence, The Watermill Center, New York.
- 2002 - Artist in residence, Delfina Studios Trust, London.
- 1999 - Artist in residence, Cite Internationale des Arts, Paris
