= Performa (performance festival) =

American nonprofit arts organization

Performa is an American nonprofit arts organization known for its Performa Biennial, a festival of performance art that happens every two years in various venues and institutions in New York City. Performa was founded in 2004 by art historian and curator RoseLee Goldberg. Since its inception 2005, Performa curators have included Defne Ayas, Tairone Bastien, Mark Beasley, Adrienne Edwards, Laura McLean-Ferris, Kathy Noble, Charles Aubin, Job Piston, Lana Wilson, and Ikechukwu Onyewuenyi. The organization commissions new works and tours performances premiered at the biennial. It also manages the work of choreographer and filmmaker Yvonne Rainer.

== Performa Biennial ==
=== Performa 05 commissions ===
In 2005, Performa hosted the first Performa Biennial, a series of performance events at venues and institutions across New York City including the Kitchen, Anthology Film Archives, Artists Space, the Swiss Institute, Salon 94, Paula Cooper Gallery, and the online radio station free103point9. Founding curator and director, Goldberg told Interview magazine that her objective in creating the festival was "to produce new work that I'd never seen before and have the miracle of working with artists who would make things of wonder. The second was to deal with this history." Performa 05 presented new works by artists working in performance as well as first performance works by artists working in other mediums. The biennial also re-staged seminal performance works from history.

Artists Jesper Just and Francis Alÿs presented new live performances specifically commissioned for Performa 05 and the Solomon R. Guggenheim Museum presented Marina Abramović's Seven Easy Pieces, in which Abramović re-performed several works from the canon of early performance works, including two of her own. Performances included works by Gina Pane, Vito Acconci, Valie Export, Bruce Nauman, and Joseph Beuys. Other featured artists in Performa 05 included Shirin Neshat, Clifford Owens, Tamy Ben-Tor, Laurie Simmons, Wanda Raimundi-Ortiz, Coco Fusco, and Christian Marclay.

- Jesper Just: True Love Is Yet To Come?, 2005 at Stephan Weiss Studio, Greenwich Street, New York
- Francis Alÿs: Rehearsal II at The Slipper Room, 2005 at 167 Orchard Street at Stanton Street
- Performa Radio, 2005, on WFMU (91.1FM-NY) and WKCR (89.9FM-NY)

=== Performa 07 commissions ===
Performa 07 was the second edition. Building on the momentum of Performa 05, more than sixty venues and twenty curators joined in invigorating performance art in the city. This edition opened the doors to other disciplines, especially highlighting dance. Performa Commissions expanded its roster with 10 artists creating new work for the biennial including Japanther, Nathalie Djurberg, Carlos Amorales, Sanford Biggers, Isaac Julien and Russell Maliphant, Daria Martin, Kelly Nipper, Adam Pendleton, Yvonne Rainer, and Francesco Vezzoli. Each commission was chosen for an inherent theatricality and a particular use of timing that reflected the potential in working with live performance.

- Japanther, Japanther in (3-D), 2007 at Performance Space 122
- Nathalie Djurberg, Untitled (Working Title Kids & Dogs), 2007 at the Zipper Theater
- Carlos Amorales, Spider Galaxy, 2007 at 590 Madison Avenue (The Atrium)
- Sanford Biggers, The Somethin' Suite, 2007 at The Box
- Isaac Julien & Russell Maliphant, Cast No Shadow, 2007 at Brooklyn Academy of Music Harvey Theater
- Daria Martin, Harpstrings & Lava, 2007 at Tribeca Grand Hotel Screening Room
- Kelly Nipper, Floyd on the Floor, 2007 at Judson Memorial Church
- Adam Pendleton, The Revival, 2007 at Stephan Weiss Studio
- Yvonne Rainer, RoS Indexical, 2007 at The Hudson Theatre at Millennium Broadway Hotel
- Francesco Vezzoli, Cosi' e (se vi pare) Right You Are (If You Think You Are), 2007 at Solomon R. Guggenheim Museum

=== Performa 09 commissions ===
A hundred years after the Futurist manifesto was written, Performa 09 revisited its radical propositions. The third edition of the biennial covered New York City with banquets, exhibitions, street parades, noise concerts, sleep-ins, film screenings and performances. Architecture was an important addition to the biennial with the establishment of Performa Hub, the first architecture commission and a starting point to the matrix of events and discussions happening all around the city.

12 new commissions proposed an alternative view of futurism within the fast-paced world we live in. Each artist produced a work provoking the future including an opening night moving feast, a cell-phone parade, a talk show, a mysterious journey through the Lower East Side, and a musical spectacle based on high-school yearbook photos.

- Arto Lindsay, SOMEWHERE I READ
- Jennifer Rubell, Creation
- Guy Ben-Ner, Drop the Monkey
- Christian Tomaszewski and Joanna Malinowska, Mother Earth Sister Moon
- Omer Fast, Talk Show
- Candice Breitz, New York, New York
- Music for 16 Futurist Noise Intoners
- Wangechi Mutu, Stone Ihiga
- Mike Kelley, Extracurricular Activity Projective Reconstruction #32, Plus
- Futurist Life Redux
- Dominique Gonzales-Foerster and Ari Benjamin Meyers, K.62 and K.85
- Yeondoo Jung, Cinemagician

=== Performa 11 commissions ===
Performa 11 was the fourth edition of the Performa Biennial and covered a range of themes from language to Fluxus to the relationship between visual art and theater. 150 artists were part of the biennial including Elmgreen & Dragset, Mika Rottenberg, Frances Stark, Gerard Byrne, Tarek Atoui, Simon Fujiwara, Ming Wong, Shirin Neshat, Lauren Nakadate and James Franco, Liz Magic Laser, Iona Rozael Brown, Guy Maddin, and Ragnar Kjartansson each of whom presented a new commissioned work. Moving between disciplines and exploring the intricacies of various mediums, artists investigated vocabularies, attitudes, and histories. Russian Constructivism acted as a touchstone in considering performance and shifting between disciplines.

- Elmgreen & Dragset, Happy Days in the Art World, 2011 at Skirball Center for the Performing Arts
- Mika Rottenberg and Jon Kessler, Seven, 2011
- Frances Stark, Put a Song in Your Thing, 2011 at Abrons Art Center
- Gerard Byrne, In Repertory, 2011 at Abrons Art Center
- Tarek Atoui, Visiting Tarab, 2011 at SIR Stage
- Simon Fujiwara, The Boy Who Cried Wolf, 2011 at Abrons Art Center
- Ming Wong, Persona Performa, 2011 at Museum of the Moving Image
- Shirin Neshat, OverRuled, 2011 at Cedar Lake
- Laurel Nakadate and James Franco, Three Performances in Search of Tennessee, 2011 at Abrons Art Center
- Liz Magic Laser, I Feel Your Pain, 2011 at SVA Theater
- Iona Rozeal Brown, battle of yestermore, 2011 at Skylight West
- Guy Maddin, Tales from the Gimli Hospital: Reframed, 2011 at Walter Reade Theater
- Ragnar Kjartansson, Bliss, 2011 at Abrons Art Center

=== Performa 13 commissions ===
From November 1 to 24, 2013, Performa 13 transformed New York into the performance capital of the world through live performances taking place in various venues throughout the city. Thirty-five curators and more than a hundred artists from around the world were part of realizing this biennial. Surrealism acted as the historical anchor for this edition of Performa, both in its Parisian mode and in its diasporic form. The new commissioned performances, projects, and talks investigated the concept of voice as an element missing from artists' performance. This notion of the voice expanded into a discussion on communication across cultures and countries exploring the meaning of “citizenship”.

- Paweł Althamer, Biba Performa, 2013, and Queen Mother of Reality Inauguration, 2013 at Socrates Sculpture Park
- Rashid Johnson, Dutchman, 2013 at 10th Street Bath House, East 10th Street
- Ryan McNamara, MEƎM: A STORY BALLET ABOUT THE INTERNET, 2013 at Connelly Theater
- Subodh Gupta, Celebration, 2013 at The Old Bowery Station, Bowery
- Florian Heckter, C.D. – A Script for Synthesis, 2013 at Solomon R. Guggenheim Museum
- Alexandre Singh, The Humans, 2013 at BAM Fisher
- Rosa Barba, Subconscious Society – Live, 2013 at Anthology Film Archives, Second Avenue
- Eddie Peake, Endymion, 2013 at Swiss Institute
- Shana Lutker, The Nose, The Cane, The Broken Left Arm, 2013 at Theatre 80, St Marks Place
- Marianne Vitale, The Missing Book of Spurs, 2013 at 5-01 46th Road, Long Island City
- Raqs Media Collective, The Last International, 2013 at Connelly Theater
- Tori Wrånes, Yes Nix, 2013 at SIR Stage 37, West 37th Street

=== Performa 15 commissions ===
Performa 15 celebrated a decade of Performa since its conception in 2005. Continuing with the traditions established through the years, the biennial once again examined art across disciplines ranging from visual arts to dance, film, radio, sound, and architecture. Instead of having the works be restricted within a specific subject matter, the spectrum of topics extended across metropolitan life. The history of the Rennaissance acted as an anchor to the research process. Performa 15 also collaborated with the Paris foundation Lafayette Anticipations, setting up headquarters in New York.

- Ryan Gander, Earnest Hawker, 2015
- Francesco Vezzoli and David Hallberg, Fortuna Desperata, 2015 at St. Bart's Church, Park Avenue
- Pauline Curnier Jardin, The Resurrection Plot, 2015 at Pioneer Works
- Wyatt Kahn, Work, 2015 at Swedish Cottage Marionette Theatre
- Jérôme Bel, Ballet (New York), 2015 at Marian Goodman Gallery; Martha Graham Studio Theater; and El Museo del Barrio
- Robin Rhode, Arnold Schönberg's Erwartung – A Performance by Robin Rhode, 2015 at Times Square
- Zheng Mahler, New York Post – et Préfiguratif (Before and After New York), 2015
- Erika Vogt, Artist Theater Program, 2015 at Roulette, Atlantic Ave.
- Jesper Just and FOS, in the shadow/ of a spectacle/ is the view of the crowd, 2015
- Juliana Huxtable, There Are Certain Facts that Cannot Be Disputed, 2015 at Museum of Modern Art
- Oscar Murillo, Lucky dip, 2015 at Alexander Hamilton U.S. Custom House
- Laura Lima, Gala Chickens and Ball, 2015
- Agatha Gothe-Snape, Rhetorical Chorus (LW), 2015 at New York Society for Ethical Culture
- Edgar Arceneaux, Until, Until, Until..., 2015

=== Performa 17 commissions ===
In Performa 17, artists dealt with a range of subject matters centering around the use of live performance as central to artistic practice in African art and culture, the intersection of architecture and performance, and the hundred-year legacy of Dada. Performa curators visited Dakar, Nairobi, Addis Ababa, Tangier, Johannesburg and Cape Town as part of the research process examining these urban centers.

The commissions reflected the many different aesthetics, values, cultures, and climates, examining the role of art within them. Yto Barrada, William Kentridge, Tarik Kiswanson, Kemang Wa Lehulere, Julie Mehretu and Jason Moran, Zanele Muholi, Wangechi Mutu, Kelly Nipper, Jimmy Robert, and Tracey Rose were among those who participated in the biennial which took place November 1 to 19, 2017. The Dada movement served as a 'historical anchor' for the artists.

- Yto Barrada, Tree Identification for Beginners
- Brian Belott, People Pie Pool at Abrons Arts Center
- Xavier Cha, Buffer at Brooklyn Academy of Music
- Teju Cole, Black Paper
- François Dallegret, The Environment-Bubble (1965–2017)
- Nicholas Hlobo, umBhovuzo: The Parable of the Sower
- Flora Kasearu, Ainult liikmetele (Members Only)
- William Kentridge, Ursonate at the Harlem Parish
- Barbara Kruger
- Kris Lemsalu and Kyp Malone, Going, Going
- Julie Mehretu and Jason Moran, MASS (HOWL, eon) at the Harlem Parish
- Mohau Modisakeng, ZION
- Zanele Muholi, Masihambisane – On Visual Activism
- Wangechi Mutu, Banana Stroke
- Narcissister, The Body Is a House at Participant Inc
- Kelly Nipper, Terre Mécanique
- Eiko Otake, A Body in Places
- Jimmy Robert, Imitation of Lives at the Glass House
- Bryony Roberts and Mabel O. Wilson with the Marching Cobras of New York, Marching On
- Tracey Rose
- Anu Vahtra, Open House Closing
- Kemang Wa Lehulere, I cut my skin to liberate the splinter

=== Performa 19 commissions ===
The eighth edition of the Performa Biennial took place between November 1 and 24, 2019. Performa 19 was influenced by the 100th anniversary of the Bauhaus, the first art and architecture school to house a theater class. Examining the Bauhaus' revolutionary approach to interdisciplinary experimentation, the biennial looked at the intense social and political environment that encouraged the merging of art and life.

New works created by artists, including Korakrit Arunanondchai, Ed Atkins, Nairy Baghramian, Tarik Kiswanson, Paul Pfeiffer and Samson Young approached performance from unique perspectives. Alongside the commissioned work, the Performa Institute used this exploration to debate the question 'what is the art school of the 21st century?' considering how best to equip young artists with ethical and aesthetic tools.

- Korakrit Arunanondchai, Together
- Ed Atkins, A Catch Upon the Mirror at Abrons Arts Center
- Nairy Baghramian and Maria Hassabi, Entre Deux Actes (Ménage à Quatre)
- Cecilia Bengolea and Michèle Lamy, Before We Die
- Yu Cheng-Ta, FAMEME, Derived from the ancient Yunnanese for "Bringer of very great fortune and health."
- Torkwase Dyson, I Can Drink the Distance: Plantationocene in 2 Acts
- Su Hui-Yu, The White Water
- Tarik Kiswanson, AS DEEP AS I COULD REMEMBER, AS FAR AS I COULD SEE
- Kia LaBeija, (Untitled) The Black Act
- Lap-See Lam, Phantom
- Shu Lea Cheang, SLEEP1237
- Eva Mag, Dead Matter Moves
- Paul Maheke and Nkisi, Sènsa
- Gaetano Pesce
- Paul Pfeiffer, University of Georgia Redcoat Band Live at the Apollo Theater
- Huang Po-Chih, Heaven on Fourth
- Yvonne Rainer, Parts of Some Sextets (1965–2019)
- Bunny Rogers, Sanctuary at the Essex Street Academy
- Ylva Snöfrid, Nostalgia–Acts of Vanitas
- Samson Young, The Eight Immortals
- Chou Yu-Cheng, CHEMICAL GILDING, KEEP CALM, GALVANIZE, PRAY, ASHES, MANIFESTATION, UNEQUAL, DISSATISFACTION, CAPITALIZE, INCENSE BURNER, SURVIVAL, AGITATION, HIT
- Andros Zins-Browne and Karthik Pandian, Atlas Unlimited: Acts VII–X at 80WSE

=== Performa 21 commissions ===
Performa 21, from October 12 to 31, 2021, was the ninth edition of the biennial and presented performance art outdoors in response to the pandemic. New live commissions took place within the urban landscape of New York City. In previous editions, the Performa Biennial had consistently engaged with the city as a stage, making art directly accessible to the public and challenging the understanding of performance.

Commissions by Kevin Beasley, Ericka Beckman, Sara Cwynar, Danielle Dean, Madeline Hollander, Andrés Jaque (Office for Political Innovation), Tschabalala Self, and Shikeith continued this legacy. Coming together under the same program, these artists considered the changes the city goes through culturally, socially, spatially, racially, and politically. Broadcasting was also used as a medium expanding to Performa TV, Performa Radio, Performa's online exhibition program Radical Broadcast, and Performa Telethon creating an array of audio and video content.

- Kevin Beasley, The Sound of Morning
- Ericka Beckman, Stalk
- Sara Cwynar, Down at the Arcade
- Danielle Dean, Amazon (Proxy)
- Madeline Hollander, Review
- Andrés Jaque / Office for Political Innovation, Being Silica
- Tschabalala Self, Sounding Board
- Shikeith, notes towards becoming a spill

=== Performa 23 commissions ===
For three weeks from November 1 to 19, 2023, the tenth edition of the Performa Biennial presented performance art from 40 artists around the world. Performa 23 subtly underscored a sense of political urgency as artists across mediums delivered environmental, political or cultural critique through their conceptions.

Julien Creuzet, Marcel Dzama, Nikita Gale, Nora Turato, Franz Erhard Walther, and Haegue Yang were the commissioned artists displaying new work produced over the course of two years. In addition, the biennial included the Finnish Pavilion Without Walls, the Performa Hub, launch of the Performa Archives, and a new series titled Protest & Performance: A Way of Life.

- Julien Creuzet, Algorithm ocean true blood moves
- Marcel Dzama, To Live on the Moon (For Lorca)
- Nikita Gale, OTHER SEASONS
- Nora Turato, Cue The Sun
- Franz Erhard Walther, Creation Needs Action
- Haegue Yang, The Malady of Death – Monodrama with Noma Dumezweni
