= Frequency Exhibition =

Art exhibition of contemporary Black works (2005–2006)

Coordinates: 40°48′30.52″N 73°56′51.12″W

- Date: March 12, 2006.
- Duration: November 9, 2005
- Venue: Studio Museum in Harlem
- Location: New York City, New York, United States
- Type: Art exhibition

The Frequency Exhibition was a contemporary exhibition at the Studio Museum in Harlem from November 9, 2005 - March 12, 2006. Curated by Thelma Golden and associate curator Christine Y. Kim, the exhibition featured the works of 35 emerging Black artists. Frequency, following the 2001 exhibition "Freestyle," is one of five "F" themed exhibitions alongside Flow, Fore, and Fictions. While curators Golden and Kim point out that Frequency was not "Freestyle II," the organization of artists under the umbrella of Black identity engages with "Post-Black" art similarly to the Freestyle exhibition.

== Background ==
Following Freestyle's success in 2001, Golden felt at first that the necessity of curating a show whose work featured emerging black artists was not as immediate. She states in the Frequency brochure: "After the tremendous success of Freestyle in 2001, I had both privately and publicly acknowledged that there might no longer be a need for me to organize group shows featuring the works of emerging black artists." While Golden had felt her project had made important strides in addressing a racially oblivious art world composed mainly of white graduate-level educated artists, events like Hurricane Katrina exposed racial tensions and issues of segregation anew. It was in this context that Frequency was organized and carried out. Artists featured in Freestyle further went on to score gallery positions and art-star status, creating expectations of similar celebrities in the following exhibition.

== Works ==
- Michael Paul Britto's video art and documentary film work: Dirrrty Harriet Tubman, 2005.
- Drawings by Nyame Brown: Battle for the break of dawn ...it goes on, an on, an on, an on ..., 2005; Blackman, 2004; B-boy slick, 2004; Monkey head with an icy grill, 2004.
- Photographs and video from Jonathan Calm: Scratching Chance, 2005.
- Sculpture and assemblage by Nick Cave: Sound Suits, 2004.
- Zoë Charlton's drawings and installations: There Goes the Neighborhood, 2004; Dress Rehearsal, 2005; Spy, 2005; WOO, 2005; Tip Toe, 2005; The Swimming Lesson, 2004; Dead White Men, 2005.
- Collage and assemblage by Mike Cloud: African Ceremonies, 2005.
- Photography and videography by Isaac Diggs: Bling, 2002.
- Installation and multimedia environments by Kianga Ford: Urban Revival, 2005; The Complex, So Cal Multi-4, 2005.
- Rashawn Griffin's sculpture, painting, video, and spaces: Untitled (room), 2005; to bring love/terrible things, 2004.
- Photographs, sculpture, and web project by Leslie Hewitt: riffs on real time, 2002-05; Grounded, 2004; The Theory of the Leisure Class, 2004.
- Film by Wayne Hodge: Doppelganger I, 2004; Doppelganger II (Body and Soul), 2005.
- "Quilt paintings" by Sedrick Huckaby: A Love Supreme, 2003-05.
- Kalup Linzy's video work: Conversations Wit de Churen: Da Young and Da Mess, 2005.
- Multimedia installation by Nzuji De Magalhães: Eta: A Proverb by my Mother, 2005.
- Rodney McMillian's sculptures, paintings, and video: Untitled, 2004; chair, 2003; Wood Paneling, 2004; Untitled (an audience), 2003.
- Tape images and outlines by Lester Julian Merriweather: positioning (as opposed to passing and posing) vol.3, 2005; Untitled, 2002; Untitled, 2002-03.
- Dioramas and collages by Wardell Milan II: Burning Giraffe: Love part 4, 2005; Untitled (Love part 3), 2005.
- Performance, sculpture, and photography by Demetrius Oliver: Till, 2004; Tracks, 2004; Nest, 2005; Stacked, 2004.
- Xiomara De Oliver's paintings: Allegory of Some Bombshell Girls––only in flamingo grass, 2005; Love Nuggets, 2004.
- Karyn Olivier's mixed-media and installation work: Whispering Domes, 2001; Bench (Seating for One), 2003; Ridgewood Line (BQT Ghost No. 6064), 2004.
- Graphics by Adam Pendleton: History, 2005; Because, 2004–05; Concrete, 2004.
- Films by Jefferson Pinder: Car Wash Mediations, 2005; Invisible Man, 2005.
- Drawings by Robert A. Pruitt: CEO Portrait (Talented 10th Series), 2004; Diasporic Leap, 2005; Pretty for a Black Girl, 2005.
- Michael Queenland's sculptures, mixed-media installation: Untitled (Radical Since 1774) #2, 2005; SHAKER PICTURE: Dry Sink, 2005; Untitled (Derelict Cult Compound), 2005.
- Marc André Robinson's "paintings": Velocity of Barbarism, 2005; Crusade Fragments, 2004-05.
- Photographs, films, and performance from Xaviera Simmons: High Seasoned Brown, 2004; Landscape Playground (It Ain't Hard to Tell), 2005; Make the Fist, 2004.
- Installation by Kwabena Slaughter: Sideview, 2005.
- Drawings, paintings, and sculpture from Shinique Amie Smith: Bale Variant No. 0006, 2005; The Giving Tree, 2005.
- Jeff Sonhouse's paintings: Exhibit A: Cardinal Francis Arinze, 2005; Meeting at the Crossroads, 2003; Inauguration of the Solicitor, 2005.
- Photographs by Hank Willis Thomas: Liberation of T.O.: Ain't no way I'm go'n in back ta' work fa' massa in dat darn field, 2004; Basketball and Chains, 2003; Winter in America, 2005.
- Multimedia paintings from Mickalene Thomas: Rumble (from the Brawling Spitfire wrestling series), 2005; Instant Gratification (from the Brawling Spitfire wrestling series), 2005.
- Compositions by Jina Valentine: Appetite for Destruction: Top 40 Best Selling Albums Ever, 2005; Appetite for Destruction: Expulsion, 2005.
- William Villalongo's paintings and sculptures: The Abduction of Bacchus, 2005; Love Before the Colonization of Mars, 2004; The Centaur's Kiss, 2005.
- Roberto Visani's sculpture and assemblage work: Corner Cutters, 2005; Rouge Serpentine, 2005.
- Paintings by Paula Wilson: Turf, 2005; Red Pop Luncheon, La Folie du Jour, 2005.

== Critical reception ==
Frequency is often characterized in relation to the Studio Museum's preceding exhibition Freestyle. Described as veering "between the flashy and the subdued," the exhibition grappled with Black identity through a complex interplay between past and present. Melissa Gronlund, writing for frieze, saw the exhibition as an overly-ambitious attempt at referencing particular histories and racial stereotypes. Its aesthetic qualities, in her eyes, did not always reinforce the artistic sincerity of the work; Gronlund found more melancholic artists to be more genuine in their uses of a "craft aesthetic." Writing for The Brooklyn Rail, Nick Stillman also takes note of the exhibition's identity-based conceptual work which goes beyond the creation of iconic imagery. The absence of and working around iconic "black" images reflects the curators' engagement with the "post-black" in this exhibit without a centralizing organizational principle.
