= Freestyle Exhibition =

2001 contemporary art exhibition at The Studio Museum in Harlem

Freestyle was a contemporary art exhibition at The Studio Museum in Harlem from April 28-June 24, 2001 curated by Thelma Golden with the support of curatorial assistant Christine Y. Kim. Golden curated the works of 28 emerging black artists for the exhibition, characterizing the work as 'Post-Black'. The latter is a term she generated along with artist Glenn Ligon as a genre of art "that had ideological and chronological dimensions and repercussions. It was characterized by artists who were adamant about not being labeled as 'black' artists, though their work was steeped, in fact deeply interested, in redefining complex notions of blackness." Freestyle was her first major project at The Studio Museum in Harlem and the first of an ongoing series of 'F' themed exhibitions including Frequency, Flow and Fore. The most recent iteration of the series was 2017's Fictions.

== Background ==
At the time of the exhibition, Thelma Golden had recently resigned from a position at the Whitney as their first black curator, accepting the position of deputy director at The Studio Museum in Harlem (SMH) during a time of renovation for the museum. Ten years prior to her new role at the SMH, she had worked as a curatorial intern for the same museum. Golden credits her time at the Whitney Museum working on the 1993 Whitney Biennial as: "my curatorial education really on every level: my education about working with artists, my education about commissioning work, my education about understanding the museum context, my education about the notion of audience and how it operates". She also curated the Whitney's 1994 Black Male exhibition, thinking of the black male as a subject through the works of a multi-cultural roster of artists and the 1998 Bob Thompson exhibition, which she described as being "the first major survey of a mid-century African-American artist in a long time."

Golden selected "Freestyle" artists based on the quality of her studio visits and her resonance with the artists themselves, referring to herself as someone who deals with artists pushing the definition of American art rather than someone who deals with objects. Her vision for The Studio Museum in Harlem was a place where-in exhibitions would allow space for critique and questions to be explored. Golden was particularly interested in exploring how black artists could shape a contemporary blackness after the activism of the 1960s, the essentialist Black Arts Movement of the 1970s, the theoretical multiculturalism of the 1980s and global expansion of the late 1990s. The work that followed revealed a prevailing theme of black individuality, reflecting Golden's understanding of the exhibition title, referring to 'freestyle' as "the term which refers to the space where the musician (improvisation) or...the dancer (the break) finds the groove and goes all out in a relentless and unbridled expression of the self." The exhibition was funded by Philip Morris Companies, INC, the Peter Norton Family Foundation and the exhibition fund: Jacqueline Bradley & Clarence Otis, Fifth Floor Foundation and Joel Shappiro.

== Works ==
The artmakers of "Freestyle" experimented with digital media and sound as well as culture-specific materials like hair pomade and curling papers to explore social, political, sexual and ethnic issues. From painting and drawing to sculpture, installation and new media, the work reveals the artists' exposure to both Eastern and Western thought. Some works included:

- Photographs of flames—fires of inspiration and burning crosses—by the Brooklyn artist Rico Gatson
- Three large-format portraits by the 24-year-old photographer Rashid Johnson. Hand-brushed with mineral pigments of a homeless man the artist met in Chicago.
- An overhead sound piece by Nadine Robinson that blends political speeches by George W. Bush and Dr. Martin Luther King Jr., with laugh tracks.
- A video by Susan Smith-Pinelo that gives a continuous closeup of the artist's cleavage in a low-cut dress moving to the rhythm of Michael Jackson's Working Night and Day, as a gold necklace spelling ghetto bounces across her chest.
- Photographs by the Haitian-born Adler Guerrier of empty airport waiting rooms, ready for arrivals and takeoffs.
- A wall painting of a police helicopter done in hair pommade by Kori Newkirk, contributing a romantic nocturnal landscape, fashioned from strings of colored plastic hair beads, of a city skyline touched by fire and/or sunset light.
- Abstract paintings by Mark S. Bradford. Their surfaces are covered with edge-to-edge rectangular bits of paper forming linear grids. The applied scraps are perm endpapers used in hairdressing.
- John Bankston's fairy-tale scenes of a gay black man's progress.
- Kojo Griffin's street-fighting teddy bears.
- David Huffman's murky sci-fi scenarios of a space-traveling Aunt Jemima.
- Laylah Ali's story-board vignettes, made with rendered gouache, of Everyman stick figures bent on mutual destruction.
- Long Distance Lover by Senam Okudzeto, a Chicago-born artist. Her small, nude, figures are shown copulating and fighting. They are painted directly on phone bill receipts itemizing nightly calls to far-flung places: Uganda, Israel, the Seychelles.
- Drawings of African sculptures by Arnold J. Kemp

== Participating artists ==
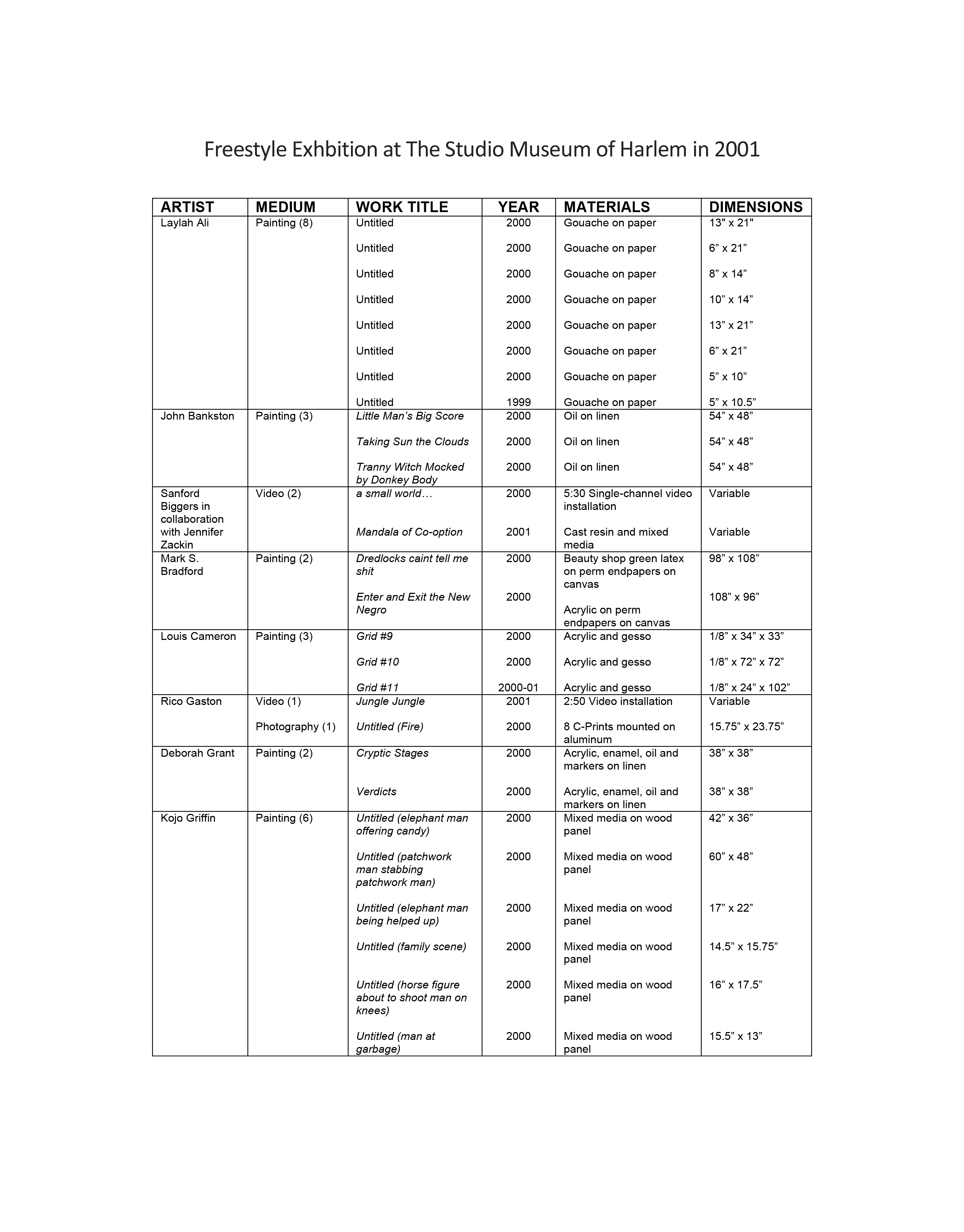
Chart contains artists included in the 'Freestyle' Exhibition, and their work content(s).

- Laylah Ali
- John Bankston

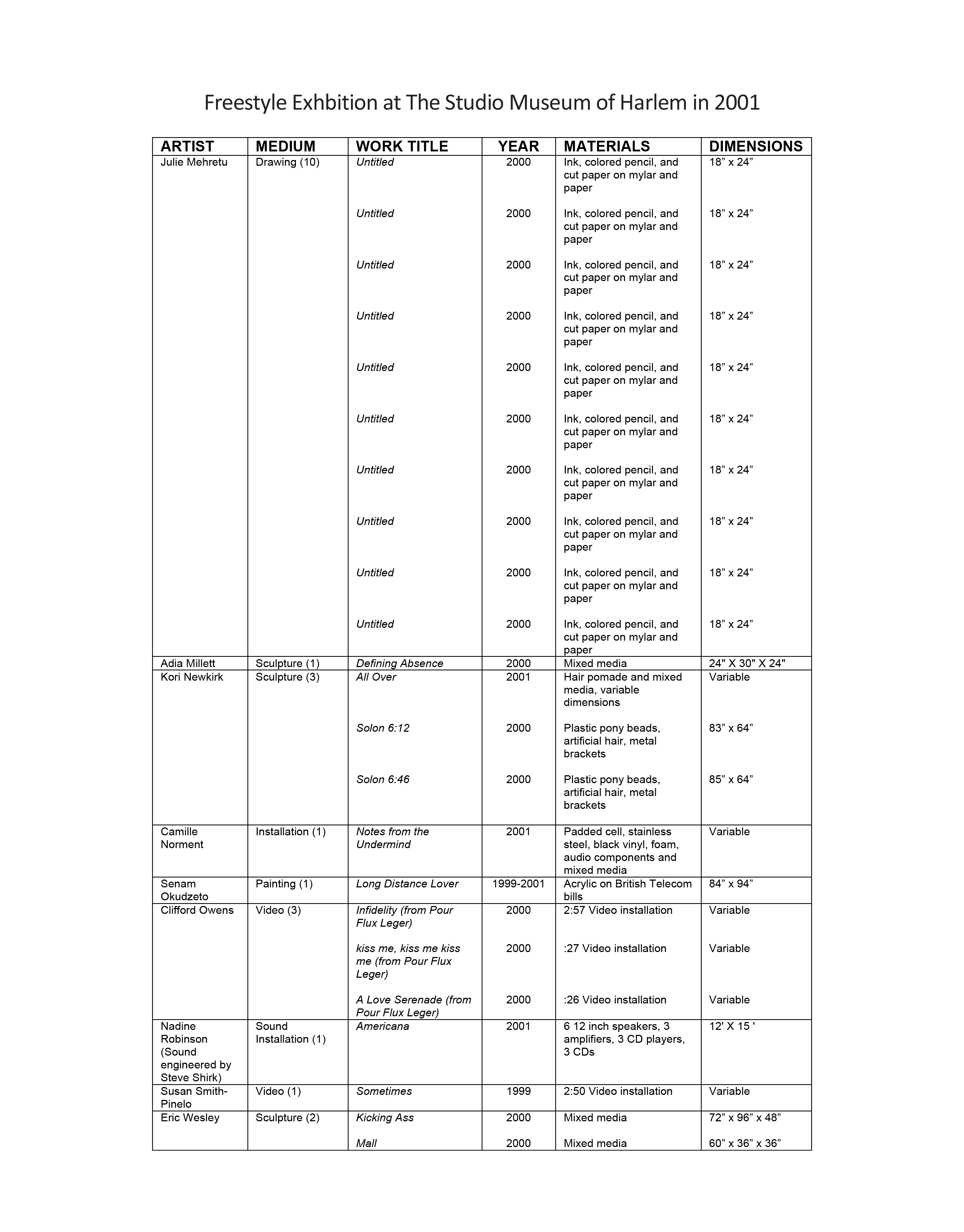
Chart contains artists included in the 'Freestyle' Exhibition, and their work content(s).

- Sanford Biggers in collaboration with Jennifer Zackin
- Mark Bradford

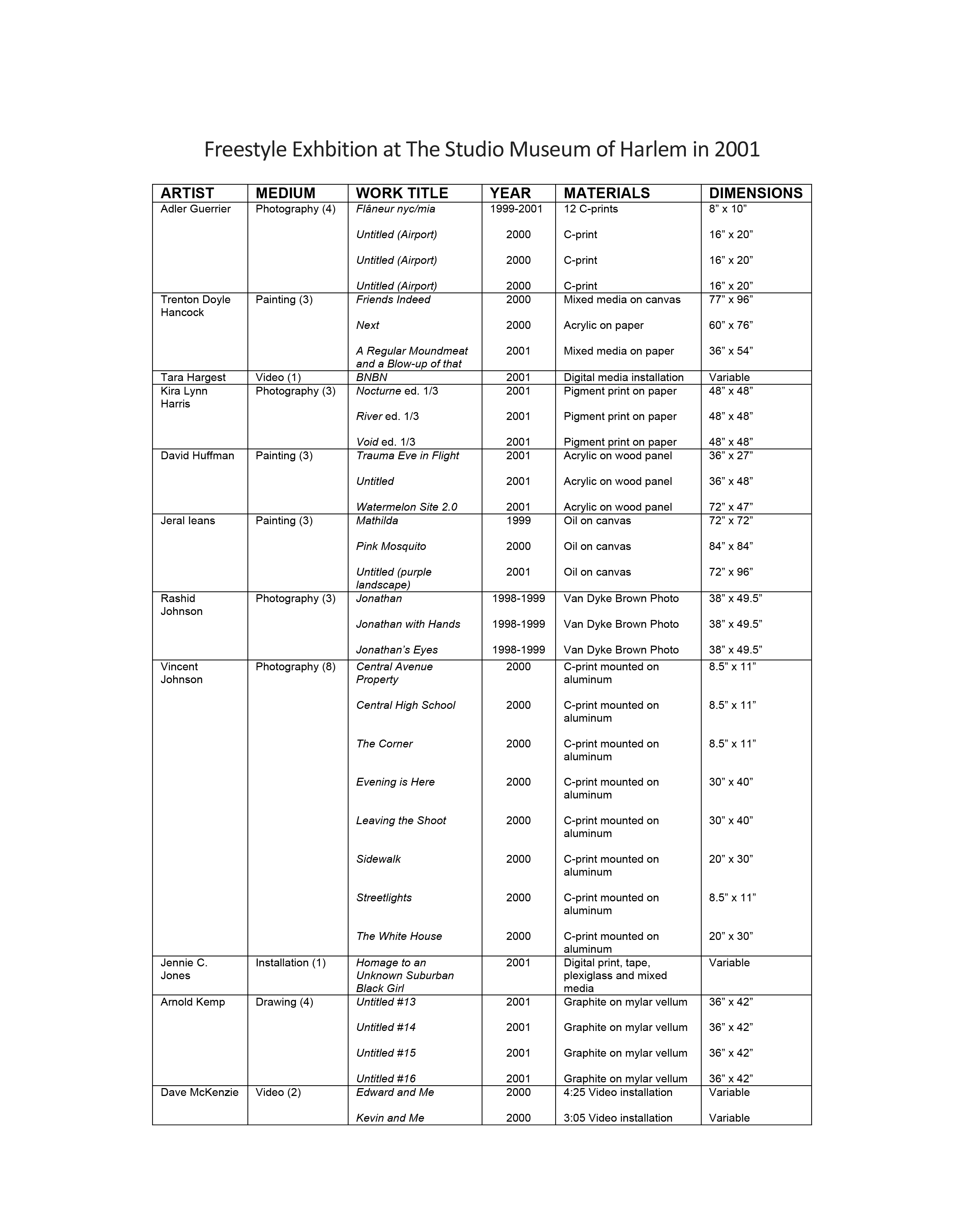
Chart contains artists included in the 'Freestyle' Exhibition, and their work contents(s).

- Louis Cameron
- Adler Guerrier
- Kori Newkirk
- Rico Gatson
- Kojo Griffin
- Deborah Grant (artist)
- Trenton Doyle Hancock
- Tana Hargest
- Kira Lynn Harris
- David Huffman (artist)
- Jeral Ieans
- Rashid Johnson
- Vincent Johnson
- Jennie C. Jones
- Arnold Kemp
- Dave McKenzie
- Julie Mehretu
- Adia Millett
- Camille Norment
- Senam Okudzeto
- Clifford Owens
- Nadine Robinson
- Susan Smith-Pinelo and Eric Wesley
