= Post-black art =

Post-black art by Rashid Johnson

I talk white, 2003

Self-portrait as the black Jimmy Connors in the finals of the New Negro Escapist Social and Athletic Club Summer Tennis Tournament, 2008

Post-black art is a category of contemporary African American art. It is a paradoxical genre of art where race and racism are intertwined in a way that rejects their interaction. I.e., it is art about the black experience that attempts to dispel the notion that race matters. It uses enigmatic themes wherein black can substitute for white. Some suggest the term is attributable to the 1995 book The End of Blackness by Debra Dickerson.

However, Thelma Golden claimed to have coined the term ‘post-black’ art with friend and artist Glenn Ligon in the late 1990s. In 2001 the phrase was explained in detail in the exhibition catalogue for The Studio Museum in Harlem’s exhibition entitled "Freestyle." Freestyle was an exhibition that included twenty-eight up and coming African American artists. Golden defined post-black art as that which includes artists who are “adamant about not being labeled ‘black’ artists, though their work was steeped, in fact deeply interested, in redefining complex notions of blackness.” She continued, “They are both post-Basquiat and post-Biggie. They embrace the dichotomies of high and low, inside and outside, tradition and innovation, with a great ease and facility.” Laura Meyers interprets this as “cutting edge works that are defined by not being defined as African American art.” Golden stated her initial interest as an attempt to remove some of the negative associations with the phrase black art as well as comment on the diversity of artists of African descent. In the exhibition catalogue, Golden proclaims, “Post-black was the new black.”

As Golden explained, post-black art refers to a younger, post-Civil Rights generation of artists who are in search of a language through which they can explore their artistic interests and identities. Because artists of African descent have historically been marginalized and left outside of the general discourse on Western art history, there has not been one style or school of African American art. The term ‘post-black’ attempts to encompass artists who have a variety of backgrounds and experiences, but all share experiences as a person of African descent.

While the notion of ‘post-black’ attempts to avoid identity labels, the title of ‘post-black’ serves as an ethnic marker. Some have found fault with this terminology, stating, “racism is real, and many artists who have endured its effects feel the museum is promoting a kind of art – trendy, postmodern, blandly international – that has turned the institution into a ‘boutique’ or ‘country club’, as David Hammons puts it.” Golden has even stated that ‘post-black’ is “both a hollow social construction and a reality with an indispensable history.”

Artists featured in The Studio Museum in Harlem’s Freestyle show included Kori Newkirk, Laylah Ali, Eric Wesley, Senam Okudzeto, David McKenzie, Susan Smith-Pinelo, Sanford Biggers, Louis Cameron, Deborah Grant, Rashid Johnson, Arnold Kemp, Julie Mehretu, Mark Bradford and Jennie C. Jones.
