= Christine Y. Kim =

American curator of contemporary art

Christine Y. Kim is an American curator of contemporary art. She is currently the Britton Family Curator-at-Large at Tate. Prior to this post, Kim held the position of Curator of Contemporary Art at the Los Angeles County Museum of Art (LACMA). Before her appointment at LACMA in 2009, she was Associate Curator at The Studio Museum in Harlem in New York. She is best known for her exhibitions of and publications on artists of color, diasporic and marginalized discourses, and 21st-century technology and artistic practices.

In 2021, ARTnews described her as "one of the most closely watched curators in the U.S."

== Early life ==
Kim, a Korean American, was born in Newport Beach and raised in the San Francisco Bay Area. Her parents, Bill S. Kim and Myung Soon "Mary" Kim, emigrated from Korea in the 1960s. Her father is the founder of Kizan International, Inc./Louis Raphael, while her mother, Mary, was a community leader who co-founded the Korean American Community Foundation of San Francisco and received a Korean Presidential Award for her contributions.

She attended Connecticut College, where she studied art history. While there, she became close friends with future fashion designer Peter Som. In 1993, she moved to New York City, where she began exploring contemporary art and briefly played bass guitar in a punk band.

== Career ==
Kim's first museum job after graduate school was in the bookstore at the Whitney Museum of American Art in 1999. She was quickly hired as a writer in the Education Department, contributing research and texts on artists and works of art in the permanent collection for The American Century where she met other aspiring young curators and writers focusing on works of art by artists of color such as Franklin Sirmans and Lisa Dent.

In 2000, following the appointments of Lowery Stokes Sims and Thelma Golden as Director and deputy director for Exhibitions and Programs, respectively, at the Studio Museum in Harlem, Kim was hired as a curatorial assistant and later promoted to assistant curator and associate curator. Kim organized the exhibition Freestyle (2000) popularizing the term "post-black art" and featuring work by artists such as Mark Bradford, Jennie C. Jones, Dave McKenzie, and Julie Mehretu. In 2003, she organized Black Belt, an exhibition that featured works by Black and, for the first time in the museum's history, Asian American artists such as Sanford Biggers, Patty Chang, Ellen Gallagher, David Hammons, Arthur Jafa, and Glenn Kaino, and their musing on cross cultural connections and hybridities growing out of 1970s popular culture. Art reviewer Roberta Smith praised the show for its recognition of "the increasingly blurred lines of racial difference" but also criticized the show as "simplistic" and mired in "artistic academicism and literal-mindedness". In 2007, Kim organized Henry Taylor: Sis and Bra, the artist's first solo museum exhibition.

Later, Kim presented exhibitions such as Kehinde Wiley: World Stage Lagos - Dakar (2008) and Flow (2008), referred to as the "African 'F' show" featuring work by artists from Africa such as Latifa Echakhch, Nicholas Hlobo, Otobong Nkanga, and Lynette Yiadom-Boakye at the Studio Museum. She also co-founded the Los Angeles Nomadic Division (LAND) a non-profit committed to temporary, site-specific public art exhibitions with curator Shamim M. Momin.

In late 2009, Kim was hired as Associate Curator at the Los Angeles County Museum of Art (LACMA), where she became "a force within the city art scene". Her exhibitions included James Turell: A Retrospective (2013–14), co-curated with Govan, which won first place for the Best Monographic Museum Exhibition in the U.S. by the International Art Critics Association (AICA-USA), and was presented concurrent with major solo presentations of Turrell's work at the Solomon R. Guggenheim Museum, New York, and the Museum of Fine Arts Houston (MFAH); Human Nature: Contemporary Art from the Collection (2011), co-curated with Franklin Sirmans; Isaac Julien: Playtime (2019) that marked the artist's first major presentation in Los Angeles; and Julie Mehretu (2019-2021), a mid-career survey curated with Rujeko Hockley, which traveled to the High Museum of Art, Atlanta and the Walker Art Center, Minneapolis. In 2019, Kim was promoted to full curator at LACMA.

In 2021, Kim was hired as a curator-at-large for the Tate museum network.

== Personal life ==
Kim married actor and comedian David Alan Grier in July 2007. The couple welcomed their daughter, Luisa Danbi Grier-Kim, in 2008, but divorced in July 2009.

Kim later remarried Dr. Kevin Gruenberg, clinical psychologist and the co-founder and Executive Director of Love, Dad: Support for Fathers and Families. She resides in Los Angeles with her husband and two children.

== List of exhibitions ==
=== Los Angeles County Museum of Art ===
- Black American Portraits co-curated with Liz Andrews, 2021
- Julie Mehretu,* 2019 - 2021 co-organized with the Whitney Museum of American Art, New York, 2020; traveling to the High Museum of Art, Atlanta 2020–21; and the Walker Art Center, Minneapolis, 2021
- Isaac Julien: Playtime, 2019
- Frances Stark: The Magic Flute, 2017
- Diana Thater: The Sympathetic Imagination,* 2015 co-curated with Lynne Cooke; toured Museum of Contemporary Art, Chicago, 2016–17
- My Barbarian: Double Agency, co-curated with Rita Gonzalez, 2015
- James Turrell: A Retrospective,* 2013-15 co-curated with Michael Govan in conjunction with the Museum of Fine Arts, Houston and the Solomon R. Guggenheim Foundation, New York; toured National Gallery of Australia, Canberra, 2014 and The Israel Museum, Jerusalem, 2014–15
- Figure and Form in Contemporary Photography: Selections from the Permanent Collection, 2012
- Christian Marclay: The Clock, 2011, 2012, 2015
- Human Nature: Selections from the Permanent Collection, 2011
- Teresa Margolles in collaboration with Los Angeles Nomadic Division (LAND), 2010–11

=== The Studio Museum in Harlem ===
- Kehinde Wiley: World Stage Africa, Lagos – Dakar,* 2008
- Flow* 2008
- Odili Donald Odita: Equalizer, 2008
- Portraits, Landscapes and Abstractions: Highlights from The Studio Museum in Harlem Permanent Collection at City Hall,* Hon. Michael Bloomberg, 2007–09
- Midnight’s Daydream: Artists-in-Residence,* 2007
- Henry Taylor: Sis and Bra, 2007
- Philosophy of Time Travel,* 2007
- Collection in Context: Silhouette, 2007
- Quid Pro Quo: Artists-in-Residence,* 2006
- Nadine Robinson: Alles Grau,* 2006
- Frequency,* 2005
- Collection in Context: Selections from the Permanent Collection, 2005
- Meschac Gaba: Tresses,* 2005
- Scratch: Artists-in-Residence,* 2005
- Lamar Peterson: Picture in a Picture, 2005
- Figuratively* 2004
- Veni Vidi Video II, 2004
- Hands On, Hands Down: Artists-in-Residence,* 2003
- Black Belt,* 2003.
- Veni Vidi Video, 2003
- Collection in Context: Selections from the Permanent Collection, 2002
- Ironic Iconic: Artists-in-Residence,* 2002
- Edgar Arceneaux: Drawings of Removal, 2002
- Africaine, 2001
- Freestyle,* 2001
- John Bankston: Capture and Escape of Mr. M, Ch. 1, 2001
- Harlem Postcards (ongoing seasonal project), 2002 – 2007
