= Viktor Sieger =

Austrian painter and printmaker (1843–1905)

Viktor Sieger (1843–1905) was an Austrian painter and printmaker.

== Life ==
Viktor Sieger was born in Vienna on 17 May 1843, or in 1824 according to some sources. He attended the fine arts academies of Vienna and Munich. He was a painter, watercolourist and engraver, notably of genre scenes. He produced 101 oil paintings and over 100 watercolours. He died in Vienna in 1905.

== Gallery ==
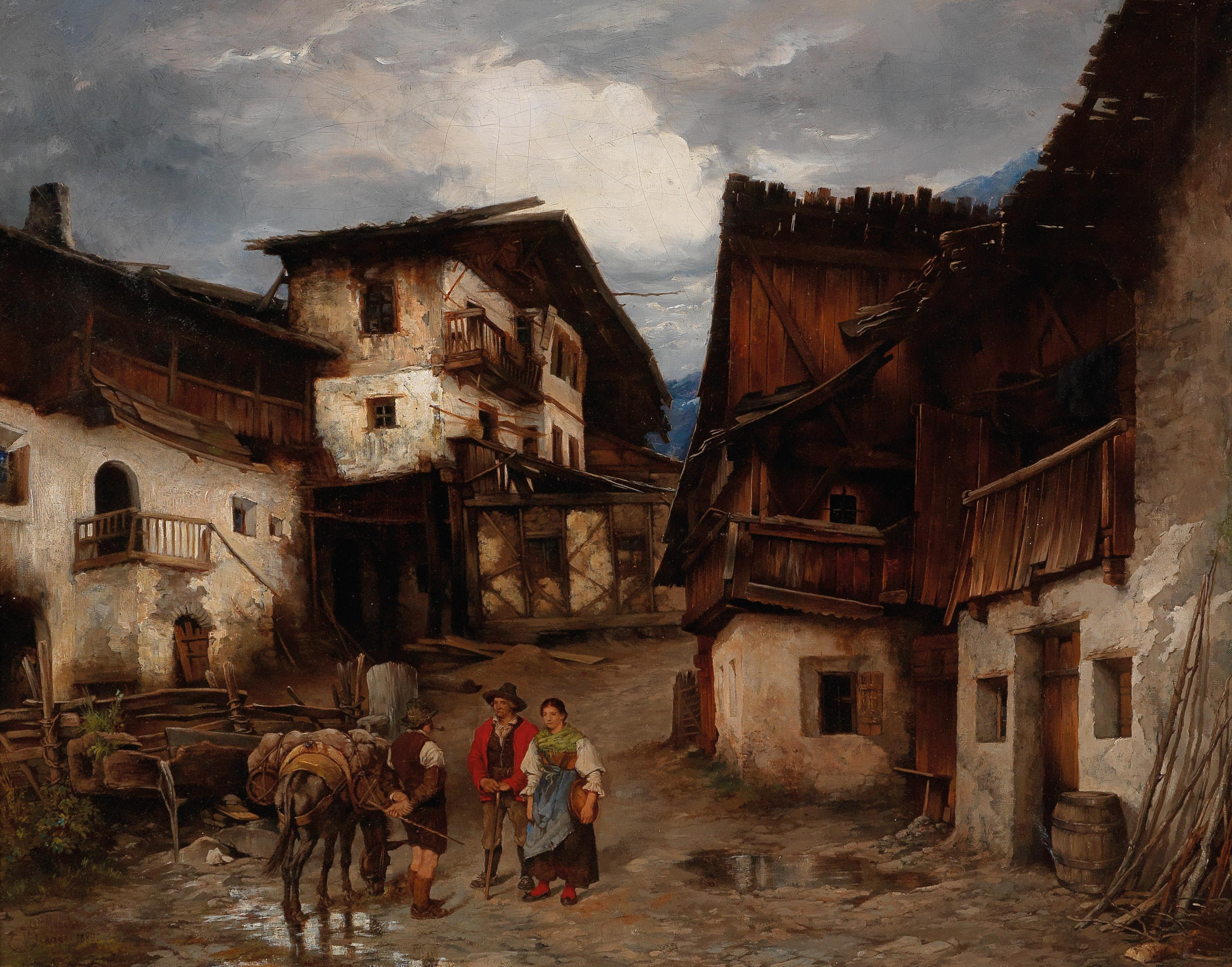
Tyrolean Village Scene (1880)

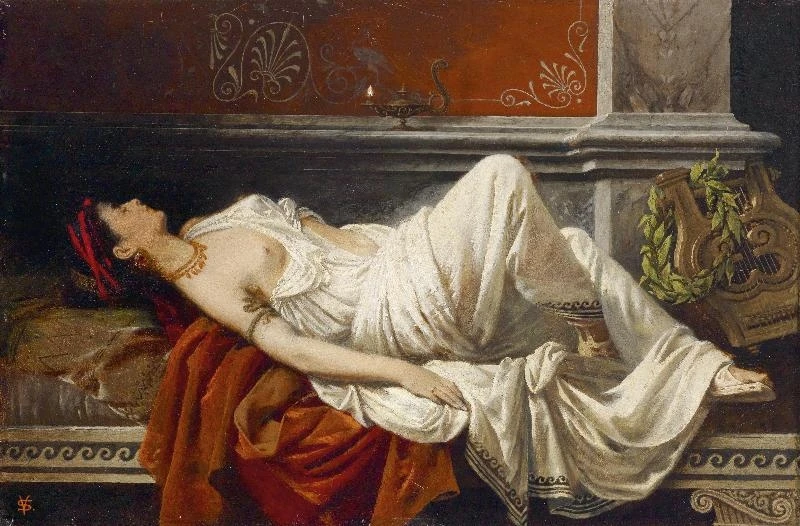
Lyre Player Resting

== Sources ==
- Beyer, Andreas; Savoy, Bénédicte; Tegethoff, Wolf, eds. "Sieger, Viktor". In Allgemeines Künstlerlexikon - Internationale Künstlerdatenbank - Online. K. G. Saur. Retrieved 9 October 2022.
- "Sieger, Viktor". Benezit Dictionary of Artists. 2011. Oxford Art Online. Retrieved 7 October 2022.
