= Une fourmi de dix-huit mètres =

1944 poem by Robert Desnos

Une Fourmi à dix-huit mètres
- Author: Robert Desnos
- Language: French
- Genre: Children's poem
- Publication date: 1944

"Une fourmi à dix-huit mètres" or La Fourmi is a French poem by Robert Desnos, written for children and published in 1944.

== History ==
This poem is part of the collection "30 Fables pour enfants sages, chantables sur n'importe quel air", first published in May 1944 as part of the "Pour enfants sages" series by Éditions Gründ. It was also performed by Juliette Gréco, with music by Joseph Kosma. The singer re-recorded it several times throughout her career.

It is frequently taught to children in preschool and primary school in France.
