= Emmanuel-Charles Bénézit =

French painter

Emmanuel-Charles Bénézit (French: [benezi]; 28 November 1887, in Paris – 17 October 1975, in Hyères) was a painter and art curator. He has been painting since the age of six, alongside Camille Pissarro and Alfred Sisley at home. His grandfather, Charles Bénézit a musician, was a close friend of Victor Hugo that he accompanied in exile in Jersey; He was the son of Dr. Emmanuel Bénézit who as a child was jumping on the knees of the poet, has a gallery in Paris; The art gallery owner and founder of the Bénézit Dictionary of Artists.

His wife was Marie Salomé Sphener-Bénézit.

After return from the army on medical grounds in 1915 he left for Provence to cure a pulmonary infection. He lived at Gassin in the Var, then Bormes-les-Mimosas. In 1930 he left Bormes for Hyères where he lived till his death at the age of 88.
