= IBCA =

IBCA may refer to:

- International Biennale of Contemporary Art 2005: A Second Sight (IBCA 2005)
- International Business Companies Act
- International Braille Chess Association, a chess organization for the visually impaired
- Inter Bank Credit Advice, (description needed)
- Israel, Britain and the Commonwealth Association
- Investment Banking Council of America
- Department of Interior Board of Contract Appeals
- International Brewing & Cider Awards
