= Christine Kim =

Christine Kim may refer to:

- Christine Y. Kim, art curator
- Christine Sun Kim, American sound artist
