= In the Land of the Blind the Blue Eye Man is King =

Painting by Deborah Grant

- Artist: Deborah Grant
- Year: 2007
- Medium: Oil, archival ink, paper, Flashe paint, and enamel on five birch panels
- Dimensions: 182.9 cm × 91.4 cm (72.0 in × 36.0 in)
- Location: Nasher Museum of Art; Durham, North Carolina

In the Land of the Blind the Blue Eye Man is King is a 2007 painting by Deborah Grant. It is in the collection of the Nasher Museum of Art in Durham, North Carolina in the United States.

== Description ==
This large scale, multi-panel, colorful painting depicts the aftermath of Hurricane Katrina. Starting from the left panel:

- Panel 1: A blue man on a horse represents Federal Emergency Management Agency (FEMA). A black creature stands in the foreground. An airplane flies in the sky, representing when President George W. Bush flew over the area after the hurricane.
- Panel 2: Various popular culture icons and symbols float throughout the panel, including the Quaker Oats man, who represents the Quakers who are anti-slavery. Other subjects include a skull, a chair, rabbits, cats, a helicopter, a snake, and a menorah.
- Panel 3: A large black cloud on the top of the panel connects Panel 2 and 3. Various dark figures are dispersed throughout the panel, many with hats on, representing FEMA.
- Panel 4: More shadowy figures are represented in this panel, as well houses, fighting dogs, and a naked woman.
- Panel 5: A large house comprises the majority of the panel, with a FEMA figure coming out the front. Figures walk up a ladder into the house.

== History ==
This painting was purchased from Grant in 2008 by Steve Turner Contemporary. In 2013, it was purchased by the Nasher with funding from JoAnn and Ronald Busuttil.

== Interpretation ==
This piece is part of Grant's body of work that she calls "random select." To create these works, she takes her own personal life experiences and blends them with historical moments and popular culture. This piece was inspired by the work of Bill Traylor. As a homage to him, Grant created the series, which this painting is a part of, titled By the Skin of Our Teeth.
