= Emmanuel Bénézit =

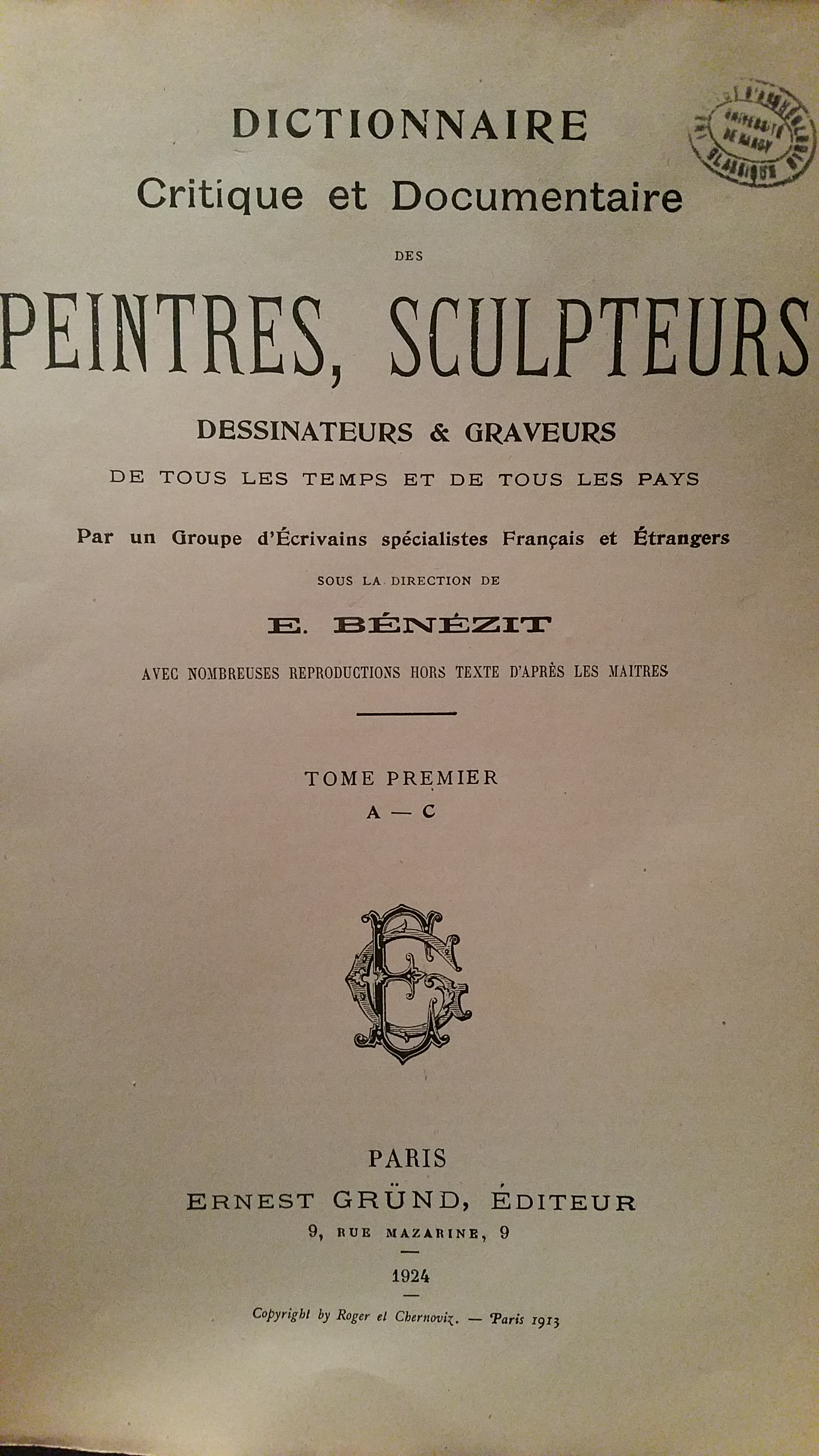
Title page of the first volume of the Bénézit of the edition of 1924.

Charles Emmanuel Bénézit (French: [benezi]; Jersey, 1854 – Paris, 1920) was a French gallery owner, collector, art historian and editor of the Benezit Dictionary of Artists.

== Biography ==
Bénézit was born on Jersey, where his father, musician Charles Bénézit, was exiled. The Channel Islands census records Charles and Euphrasie Bénézit "born in France" and Emmanuel's older sisters already being on the island before Hugo in the 1851 census, and still there after Hugo in the 1871 census. The census records five sisters; Caroline 1842, Marie 1846, Ursule 1948, Adele 1850, Berthe 1859.

His son Emmanuel-Charles Bénézit (1887–1975) was a painter and art curator. Marguerite Bénézit was his daughter.
