= Sheree Hovsepian =

Iranian-born American photographer (born 1974)

- Born: Sheree Hovsepian; 1974 (age 51–52); Isfahan, Iran
- Education: School of the Art Institute of Chicago, University of Toledo
- Known for: Assemblage, collage, photography, sculpture, drawing
- Spouse: Rashid Johnson
- Children: 1
- Awards: American Academy in Rome
- Website: Sheree Hovsepian

Sheree Hovsepian, Deserted Body, silver gelatin print, ceramic, wood, nails and velvet in walnut artist's frame, 31.5" x 25.5" x 3.5", 2022.

Sheree Hovsepian (born 1974) is an Iranian-born American artist. Her art, which includes photography, collage, sculpture and drawing, explores Identity, subjectivity and representation through the lens of embodiment and a visual language of shapes, objects and associations. Her most recognizable works—shadow-boxed photo-assemblages that interweave figurative imagery with natural and manufactured materials—are characterized by their divergent impulses toward formalism, the handmade, poetic metaphor and a contemporary examination of female experience. Critics note how these pieces treat photography as sculptural material to produce synthetic compositions, blurring boundaries between abstraction and figuration, as well as different media. Hyperallergic critic Seph Rodney observes, "[Hovsepian] depicts sections of the body in conversation with angular forms that ride a fine line between art object, design element and utilitarian tool. The work all has the subtle feel of high Modernist composition, but demonstrates greater self-awareness of the politics that surround and inhabit our bodies."

Hovsepian's work is held by the Museum of Modern Art (MoMA), Guggenheim New York, Art Institute of Chicago, and Shah Garg Collection, among others. She has exhibited at the 59th Venice Biennial (2022) and at institutions including MoMA, the Berkeley Art Museum, Center for Photography at Woodstock, International Center of Photography, Israel Museum, National Museum of Women in the Arts, and Tang Museum.

== Biography ==
Sheree Hovsepian was born in 1974 in Isfahan, Iran. Her family immigrated to the United States in 1976 and settled in Toledo, Ohio. She graduated with a dual BFA/BA from the University of Toledo in 1999, after attending the Glasgow School of Art the prior year. At the School of the Art Institute of Chicago, she studied under the late Barbara DeGenevieve and earned an MFA in 2002. During her time in Chicago, Hovsepian met her future husband, artist Rashid Johnson, with whom she has one child. They are now based in New York City and Long Island, New York. In 2026, the couple launched a long-term residency for artists and writers on the Balearic island of Menorca, The Residency at Casa Gràcia, in collaboration with the gallery Hauser & Wirth. In the same year, Hovsepian was appointed to the board of directors of the Toledo Museum of Art.

Hovsepian has had solo exhibitions at Uffner & Liu (formerly Rachel Uffner Gallery) and Higher Pictures in New York City, Monique Meloche (Chicago), Team Bungalow (Los Angeles), Halsey McKay Gallery (East Hampton, NY), Château La Coste (Provence) and Carling Dalenson (Stockholm), among others.

== Work and reception ==
Hovsepian employs an additive, layering working method, with photography serving as a catalyst to other formats and means—an approach similar to artists Sophie Calle, Annette Messeger and Ana Mendieta, whose use of the medium yielded diverse aesthetic and psychological explorations. Her images, strategies and forms assert the history, physicality and materiality of making photographs.

=== Early conceptual photography ===
Hovsepian's early series, running from roughly 2011 to 2016, gravitated toward conceptual expansions of photography that straddled abstraction and figuration, and drawings and photographs. This work was typically camera-less and involved physical interactions with materials in her studio, such as pinpricking photographic paper, pushing the limits of multiple-exposure photography (the "Sleight of Hand" series), or exposing photosensitive paper to blasts of light (the "Haptic Wonders" series). In the latter works, she made photograms by partially obscuring the paper surface with sculptural arrangements of opaque objects or by moving materials across the paper's surface; the resulting prints served as a register of her performative gestural actions and physical presence.

=== Photo-assemblages ===
Hovsepian's exhibitions at Higher Pictures (2017, 2019), Monique Meloche (2018) and the Venice Biennial (2022) centered on wall-based, shadow-box-like assemblages that extended her conceptual works into three-dimensions. In formal, geometric arrangements that abstracted and echoed the human form, she integrated intimate, fragmented images of the figure, photograms and common materials into a vocabulary of shapes and lines. Artforum critic Erica Rawles linked the assemblages to Hovsepian's prior series, commenting "the strong sense of motion across the works—twisting anatomies, folds in paper, and stretching nylon—echo the performative aspects of exposing and shielding light-sensitive paper. This practice persists in the ultimate compositions, as the photograms themselves now conceal and reveal other materials" (e.g., Introvert or Under Influence, both 2018).

Sheree Hovsepian, Avatar, bronze, 64.5" x 25" x 19.5", 2025.

For her assemblages, Hovsepian captures cropped parts of the female body, photographing her sister as a stand-in; the practice enables the artist to simultaneously be subject and maker, creating what are, loosely, self-portraits. She deploys silver-gelatin prints of the sectioned body as formal elements, building improvised figures in a manner likened to the "exquisite corpse" method by combining handmade ceramic forms and tactile materials like nylon hosiery, wood, string tied to nails and black velvet (e.g., Deserted Body, 2022). Her materials are chosen for their resonances. String, for example, connects to both drawing and gendered handiwork, while ceramic shares with photography a process that involves impression, chemical transformation and the risk of failure. Hovsepian sets the compositions within hand-crafted walnut frames. The constructed bodies are deliberately provisional and unsettled, they reflect her experiences, as an immigrant and woman, of difference, fragmented consciousness, and the body as a politically charged site.

Critics note Hovsepian's manipulation of movement, form and rhythm in the assemblages to heighten awareness of weight, gesture and the sensuality and fluidity of the female body. Playing the angles, curves and points of the human form (hip, elbow, shoulder) off of those of echoing objects (a flower, spool of twine, ceramic piece), she creates metaphors for various subjective and bodily states. The compositions employ an interplay of concealment and suggestion, hinting at purposes, relationships and collaborations between the body and objects (e.g., Rapport, 2024).

=== Expanded practice ===
In exhibitions at Uffner & Liu ("Leaning In," 2022; "Figure Ground," 2025) and Carling Dalenson ("Becoming," 2026), Hovsepian presented an expanded practice with distinct bodies of work including ceramic and bronze sculptures, ink-on-paper drawings and photography, as well as her mixed-media assemblages. They shared a visual language of common, increasingly biomorphic shapes. The large "Muscle Memory" works on paper were created with ink normally used for printing photographs and contained abstract networks of black drips that conveyed the performative movement made in their creation. The hand-built ceramic sculptures echoed the assemblages in palette (black, white and brown glazes) and form, presenting shifting silhouettes from various angles. The later exhibitions marked two firsts for Hovsepian: traditional photographs presented on their own and large (bronze) floor sculptures. The bronze pieces, built of arcs, half-moons and crescents, and matching Hovsepian in height, explore the act of asserting physical presence (e.g., Avatar, 2025).

== Collections and recognition ==
Hovsepian's work is held by the Art Institute of Chicago, Bronx Museum, International Center of Photography, Museum of Modern Art, Guggenheim New York, Spertus Museum, Shah Garg Collection, Studio Museum in Harlem, Toledo Museum of Art, and Zabludowicz Collection, among others.

She has received artist residencies from the American Academy in Rome (2024), as well as Aljira, the Banff Centre, Centre for Contemporary Photography (Toronto), The Drawing Center, Toledo Museum of Art, and Vermont Studio Center, among others.

== See also ==
- List of Iranian women artists
