= Valerie Cassel Oliver =

American fine art curator

- Education: University of Texas at Austin, Howard University
- Occupation: Curator
- Organization: Virginia Museum of Fine Arts

Valerie Cassel Oliver is curator of modern and contemporary art at the Virginia Museum of Fine Arts (VMFA). Previously she was senior curator at the Contemporary Arts Museum Houston (CAMH) in Texas. Cassel's work is often focused on representation, inclusivity and highlighting artists of different social and cultural backgrounds.

== Early life ==
Oliver grew up in Houston, then attended the University of Texas at Austin and graduate school at Howard University. She also holds an EMBA degree from Columbia Business School.

== Career ==
Oliver was a program specialist in charge of administrating grants for National Endowment for the Arts from 1988 to 1995. She also worked at the School of the Art Institute of Chicago for five years directing the Visiting Artists Program. In 2000, she was a co-curator of the Whitney Biennial. Oliver joined CAMH in 2000 as associate curator and was promoted to full curator in 2006, then senior curator in 2010. During that time Cassel Oliver helped curate a number of successful touring exhibits including Radical Presence: Black Performance in Contemporary Art (2012) and Cinema Remixed and Reloaded: Black Women Artists and the Moving Image (2008). In June 2017, she joined the Virginia Museum of Fine Art as curator of modern and contemporary art, Oliver's first show at the VMFA has been announced for January 2019, featuring painter Howardena Pindell and co-curated with Naomi Beckwith of the Museum of Contemporary Art in Chicago.

She became editor-in-chief of the Benezit Dictionary of Artists in January 2020.

=== Honors ===
In 2006, Oliver won a Getty Curatorial Research Fellowship. In 2011, she won the David C. Driskell Prize from Atlanta's High Museum of Art, a $25,000 prize recognizing contributions of an artist or scholar in the field of the art of the African diaspora.

=== Exhibitions ===
- The Dirty South: Contemporary Art, Material Culture, and the Sonic Impulse, VMFA, Richmond, Virginia, 2021
- Angel Otero: Everything and Nothing, CAMH, Houston, TX, 2016
- Right Here, Right Now: Houston, Volume 2, CAMH, Houston, TX, 2016
- Jennie C. Jones: Compilation, CAMH, Houston, TX, 2015
- Trenton Doyle Hancock: Skin and Bones, 20 Years of Drawing, 2014
- Radical Presence: Black Performance in Contemporary Art, 2013
- Hand+Made: The Performative Impulse in Art and Craft, 2010
- Benjamin Patterson: Born in the State of FLUX/us, 2010
- Cinema Remixed & Reloaded: Black Women Artists and the Moving Image since 1970, 2007
- Black Light/White Noise, 2007
- Double Consciousness: Black Conceptual Art Since 1970, 2005
- Splat Boom Pow! The Influence of Cartoons in Contemporary Art, 2003
