= Mickalene Thomas =

American painter (born 1971)

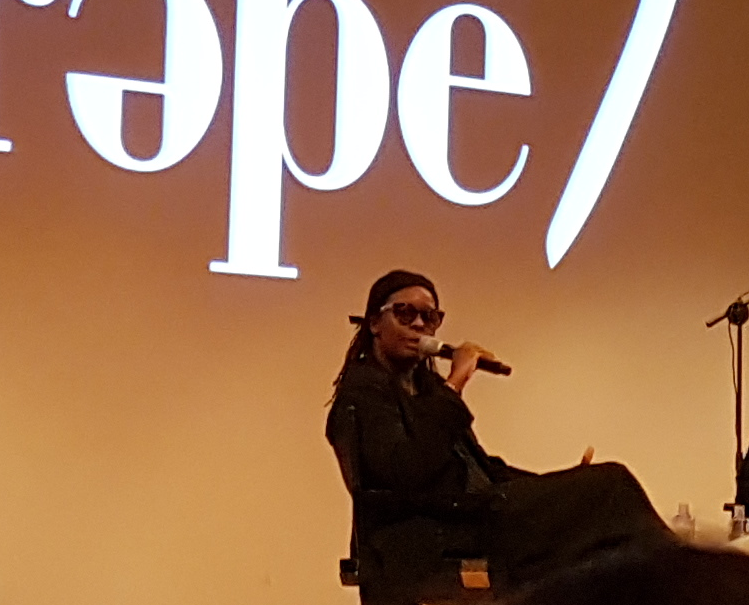
- Thomas speaking April 2017 at the Smithsonian American Art Museum
- Born: January 28, 1971 (age 55); Camden, New Jersey, U.S.
- Education: BFA Pratt Institute, Southern Cross University, MFA Yale University
- Known for: painting, photography, collage, sculpture, printmaking, video art and installation art
- Website: mickalenethomas.com

Mickalene Thomas (born January 28, 1971) is an African-American contemporary visual artist best known as a painter of complex works using rhinestones, acrylic, and enamel. Thomas's collage work is inspired from popular art histories and movements, including Impressionism, Cubism, Dada, the Harlem Renaissance, and selected works by the Afro-British painter Chris Ofili. Her work draws from Western art history, pop art, and visual culture to examine ideas around femininity, beauty, race, sexuality, and gender.

== Early life and education ==
Mickalene Thomas was born on January 28, 1971, in Camden, New Jersey. She was raised in Hillside and East Orange. She was raised by her mother Sandra "Mama Bush" Bush, who, at 6'1" tall, modeled in the 1970s. She exposed Mickalene and her brother to art by enrolling them in after-school programs at the Newark Museum, and the Henry Street Settlement in New York. Thomas' mother raised her and her brother Buddhists. As a teenager, Mickalene and her mother had a very intimate and strenuous relationship due to her parents' addiction to drugs and Thomas dealing with her sexuality, which she documented in the short film Happy Birthday to a Beautiful Woman: A Portrait of My Mother.

Thomas lived and attended school in Portland, Oregon, from the mid-1980s to the early '90s, studying pre-law and Theater Arts. Thomas received her BFA from Pratt Institute in 2000 and her MFA from Yale School of Art in 2002. Thomas participated in a residency program at the Studio Museum in Harlem, New York from 2000 to 2003. She also participated in a residency in Giverny, France at the Versailles Foundation Munn Artists Program. She currently lives and works in Brooklyn, NY.

== Artwork, style, and influences ==
Left Behind 2 Again by Mickalene Thomas, 2012, Honolulu Museum of Art

During her early career, she found herself immersed in the growing culture of DIY artists and musicians, leading her to start her own body of work. Mickalene noted that when she became an artist, fashion was always "in the back of my mind" as a source of inspiration. She was influenced by Jacob Lawrence, William H. Johnson, and Romare Bearden, but most influential to her was the work of Carrie Mae Weems, especially her Kitchen Table and Ain't Jokin series, which were part of a retrospective held at the Portland Art Museum in 1994. Thomas describes the encounter in this way: "It was the first time I saw work by an African-American female artist that reflected myself and called upon a familiarity of family dynamics and sex and gender." Weems' work not only played a role in Mickalene Thomas' decision to switch studies and apply to Pratt Institute in New York but in her using her experience and turning it into art. Thomas has also stated that Faith Ringgold provided a strong influencing in establishing Thomas' path.

Her depictions of African-American women explore notions of celebrity and identity while engaging with the representation of black femininity and black power. Inhabiting the '70s-style genre of Blaxploitation, the subjects in Thomas's paintings and collages radiate sexuality, which has been interpreted by some as satire of misogynistic and racist tropes in media, including films and music associated with the Blaxploitation genre. Women in provocative poses dominate the picture plane and are surrounded by decorative patterns inspired by her childhood as in Left Behind 2 Again from 2012, in the collection of the Honolulu Museum of Art. Her subjects are often well-known women like Eartha Kitt, Whitney Houston, Oprah Winfrey, and Condoleezza Rice. Her portrait of Michelle Obama was the first individual portrait done of the First Lady and was exhibited in the National Portrait Gallery's Americans Now show.

In her 2017 solo exhibition "Mentors, Muses, and Celebrities" at the Contemporary Art Museum St. Louis (CAM), Thomas created multi-media installations that centered black women in the narrative-arcs of their own stories. According to art critic Rikki Byrd: "Positioning black women — artists, actresses, characters, and her own family — as mentors and muses, and as heroic figures in a lineage of their own, Thomas overrides oppressive narratives."

The many years that Thomas has spent studying art history, portrait painting, landscape painting, and still life has informed her work. She has drawn inspiration from multiple artistic periods and cultural influences throughout Western art history, particularly the early modernists such as Jean-Auguste-Dominique Ingres, Pablo Picasso, Henri Matisse and Édouard Manet as well as more contemporary influences such as Romare Bearden and Pam Grier. She models her figures on the classical poses and abstract settings popularized by these modern artists as a way to reclaim agency for women who have been represented as objects to be desired or subjugated. Additionally, a personal source of inspiration in Thomas’ life was her mother, Sandra Bush, who was a fashion model at a point in time.

Mama Bush II, Keep the Home Fires Burnin' (2006) at the Rubell Museum DC in 2022, an example of Thomas' work with rhinestones

Thomas is known for her elaborate mixed-media paintings composed of rhinestones, acrylic, and enamel that present a "complex vision of what it means to be a woman and expands common definitions of beauty." Rhinestones serve as an added layer of meaning and a metaphor for artifice. Rhinestones accentuate specific elements of each painting, while subtly confronting our assumptions of what is feminine and what defines a woman, specifically black women. According to the Financial Times, "Proclaiming her own visibility and that of other women of colour is at the heart of Thomas's practice, which inserts the black female body into art history by placing her muses in iconic poses and settings." Thomas, and curators of her work, see Thomas's status as a black lesbian as part of what makes her gaze different from that of white male artists in history.

Thomas's subjects are virtually always women of color; a means to portray and empower the women and celebrate their culture and beauty—sometimes by incorporating them into iconic Western paintings. As a member of, and inspired by, the Post-Black Art movement, Thomas' work redefines perceptions of race, gender, and sexuality. Thomas blurs the distinction between object and subject, concrete and abstract, real and imaginary. Her subjects often look directly at the viewer, challenging the dominance of the male gaze in art. This assertive portrayal indicates that the models are at ease in their own skin, thus challenging the stereotype of the silent and inferior woman objectified by the viewer's gaze. In addition, seemingly insignificant decisions (like not straightening the figures' hair) have the important effect of encouraging women of color to accept themselves as they are and not conform to a particular ideology of beauty imposed by society.

Thomas's work is also distinctive in its foregrounding of queer identity; she is a queer woman of color representing women of color in a way that emphasizes their agency and erotic beauty. By emphasizing the women's striking presence and sensuality along with their assertive gazes, Thomas empowers these subjects, representing them as resilient, stunning women who command the spectator's attention. The sitters have the control and power of the gaze, and when this exchange is between women, it subverts the traditional dominance of the male gaze in art and visual culture. Thomas's queer identity is foregrounded, for example, in her painting and print edition entitled Sleep: Deux femmes noires (2012 and 2013), in which we see two female bodies intertwined in an embrace, on a sofa, thus highlighting for her audience the femininity, beauty, and sexuality of women lovers.

Thomas has collaborated with the fashion house Dior on several occasions. Including designing handbags and her own design of the classic Dior Bar Jacket.

Thomas' work was included in the 2022 exhibition Women Painting Women at the Modern Art Museum of Fort Worth.

=== Le Déjeuner Sur l'Herbe: Les Trois Femmes Noires ===
Le déjeuner sur l'herbe: Les Trois Femmes Noires is a painting created by African-American visual artist Mickalene Thomas. The title of the painting translates from French as The luncheon on the grass: The Three Black Women. The painting is a contemporary take on Édouard Manet's 1863 painting entitled Le dejeuner sur l'herbe. Thomas' piece portrays three black women adorned with rich colors, vintage patterned clothing, and radiant Afro-styled hair. The women's positioning and posing is reminiscent of the subjects of Manet's piece, but the powerful gazes of all three women are fixed on the viewer. Thomas created the painting, her largest piece at the time, in 2010 after being commissioned by the Museum of Modern Art (MoMA) in New York City to create a display piece for 53rd street window of the museum's restaurant The Modern.

==== Description ====
Le déjeuner sur l'herbe: Les Trois Femmes Noires was created in three stages. First, Thomas photographed three models in the sculpture garden of the MoMA to make the piece "site-specific". Thomas then created a collage using the photograph as a base material and added other elements. This collage now hangs in the lobby of the P.S.1, an extension of the MoMA in Queens that houses unconventional contemporary artwork. The third, painted version was based on the original photograph but composed of collage-like painted segments on wood panels and rendered in acrylic, oil, enamel, and rhinestones.

The painting stands 10 feet tall and extends 24 feet wide. Thomas has stated that she chose the massive size of the painting to physically and symbolically "take up space" in spaces that were traditionally dominated by white male artists. The original installation of the painting was in the window of The Modern, MoMA's renowned restaurant. While on display here, the piece was visible every hour of the day because it could be seen by passersby on the street; this accessibility made Le déjeuner sur l'herbe: Les Trois Femmes Noires Thomas' most public piece yet.

The subjects of the painting are three rhinestone-studded, richly dressed women of color. The models who are the subjects of the original Le déjeuner sur l'herbe: Les Trois Femmes Noires photograph are all friends of Thomas which is common across many of her photographs. All three women are fully clothed– compared to the nude female subjects in Manet's version of the scene– in richly patterned dresses that Thomas herself designed, and they sit upon fabrics staged by the artists. Many vintage patterns are used throughout the work. Thomas claims that this juxtaposition of patterns serves to represent the "amalgamation of all of the different things we are as Americans." Behind the women in both the photograph and the painting sits a Matisse sculpture that was situated behind the women in the sculpture garden.

==== Influences ====
Le déjeuner sur l'herbe: Les Trois Femmes Noires is unmistakably based on Édouard Manet's 1863 painting Le Déjeuner sur l'herbe. Manet's piece, which caused intense controversy at the time of its creation, exhibits two undressed women who are sitting comfortably with two formally dressed men at a picnic. While one of the nude women is crouched in the background, the three other subjects lounge in the foreground. The female subject in the foreground is looking out, meeting the gaze of the viewer, while the two men next to her are casually looking around.

In Thomas' version of the painting, the three subjects in the foreground are all women of color who are fully clothed in colorful dresses with patterns reminiscent of the 1970s, and all three of the women's gazes confront the viewer. The woman in the background of Manet's scene is represented in Thomas' piece by a Matisse sculpture in front of which she positioned the models in the photograph taken in the MoMA sculpture garden. Paying homage to Matisse by using his sculpture as a figure in her piece is not anomalous for Thomas as she often includes allusions to the iconic artist in her works. Thomas has cited Romare Bearden as an influence. In addition to these explicit allusions, Le déjeuner sur l'herbe: Les Trois Femmes Noires, along with many of Thomas' other pieces, is inspired by Dada, cubism, and the Harlem Renaissance.

==== Response ====
The majority of critical responses to Le déjeuner sur l'herbe: Les Trois Femmes Noires address the piece's interaction with post-black and post-feminist ideas.

Thomas' work has received criticism common of post-black art claiming that, through the overtly sensual representation of her subjects, she is reveling "in the glittery spoils of success at the expense of meaningful social engagement."

Proponents of her work, however, believe that her approach to representing her subjects "reflects the shift in black art from didactic political narrative to post-black satire."

Regarding the way in which the subjects meet the viewer's gaze, Seattle Art Museum curator Catharina Manchanda remarked, "these women are so grounded and perfectly comfortable in their own space... While we might be looking at them, they are also sizing us up."

MoMA curator Klaus Biesenbach who originally commissioned the painting for the 53rd street window display explained that he requested Thomas largely because "her treatment of surfaces as complex layers of material, lacquer, rhinestone and paint corresponds with the libidinous nature of the contents she depicts."

Since the original installment of this painting wherein the piece was exhibited as a singular display, Le déjeuner sur l'herbe: Les Trois Femmes Noires has been included in a number of exhibits across North America including the Art Gallery of Ontario, the Seattle Art Museum, and the Baltimore Museum of Art.

=== Portrait of an Unlikely Space ===
Portrait of an Unlikely Space is an exhibition co-organized by Mickalene Thomas that was on display at the Yale University Art Gallery from September 8, 2023, to January 7, 2024. The multi-gallery installation depicts domestic surroundings reminiscent of a moment in U.S. history that had never before been explicitly represented in her work: the pre-Emancipation era. The exhibition featured a selection of early American portraits of Black women, men, and children—from miniatures and daguerreotypes to silhouettes on paper and engravings in books—hanging on walls, standing within cases, and resting atop furniture. Alongside these small-scale objects, a group of artworks by Thomas and other contemporary artists in a wide array of media were situated within a homelike environment.

=== All About Love ===
In 2025 Thomas' most recent exhibition titled All About Love will begin to travel between three sites. It begins at The Broad in Los Angeles and will travel to the Barnes Foundation in Philadelphia, and end at the Hayward Gallery in London. The exhibition travel too in Les Abattoirs, a museum in Toulouse.

== Film, music, and video art ==
In addition to her paintings, the Brooklyn-based Thomas works in the mediums of photography, collage, printmaking, video art, sculpture and installation art. Her works, in particular the Odalisque series (2007), have been interpreted as "investigating the artist-model relationship [...] but from an updated perspective of female inter-subjectivity and same-sex desire." (La Leçon d'amour, 2008) She has restaged themes and symbolism with a long lineage in Western art in her references to the odalisque representation of women in exotic settings. She experimented with institutional images in FBI/Serial Portraits (2008), based on mug shots of African-American women. In 2012, Mickalene Thomas: Origin of the Universe, her first major solo museum exhibition, opened at the Santa Monica Museum of Art and traveled to the Brooklyn Museum. This show, the title of which references Gustave Courbet's 1866 painting L'Origine du monde, showcased a series of recent portraits, landscapes and interiors.

Thomas has collaborated with musician Solange, creating the cover art for her 2013 EP True. The cover began as a portrait of Solange the artist herself commissioned. Thomas and Solange also collaborated on a trailer for the music video for the song "Losing You."

Her short film Happy Birthday to a Beautiful Woman, created for her exhibition at the Brooklyn Museum, is about Sandra Bush, her mother and longtime muse. In it, Sandra talks about careers, relationships, beauty, and her fatal illness. The film made its television debut on HBO on February 24, 2014, and has run regularly since.

== Commissions ==
In 2019, Rolls-Royce auctioned a custom-designed Phantom luxury car at Sotheby's to benefit the global AIDS-eradication charity (RED); the winning bidder had the opportunity to decorate the vehicle with a unique wrap made by Thomas.

In 2020, Thomas designed a version of Dior's signature 1947 bar jacket for a cruise collection show held in Marrakesh.

For Dior's haute couture show at the Musée Rodin in January 2023, the brand's creative director Maria Grazia Chiuri commissioned Thomas to create the stage design that served as the show's backdrop. Mounted on the walls surrounding the museum's runway floor were collaged black and white images of 13 Black and mixed-race female performers, including Josephine Baker, Diahann Carroll, Marpessa Dawn, Lena Horne, and Nina Simone. Their images, which were overlaid with pink and yellow forms, featured embroidered details produced by the Mumbai-based artisan group Chanakya ateliers and the Chanakya School of Craft.

== Recognitions and honors ==
Thomas has been awarded multiple prizes and grants, including the BOMB Magazine Honor (2015), MoCADA Artistic Advocacy Award (2015), AICA-USA Best Show in a Commercial Space Nationally, First Place (2014), Anonymous Was A Woman Grant (2013), Audience Award: Favorite Short, Second Annual Black Star Film Festival (2013), Brooklyn Museum Asher B. Durand Award (2012), Timehri Award for Leadership in the Arts (2010), Joan Mitchell Foundation Grant (2009), Pratt Institute Alumni Achievement Award (2009) and Rema Hort Mann Foundation Emerging Artist Grant (2007). In 2026, Thomas received the Torchbearer "Carrying Change" Awards' Legend Award.

Thomas has held residencies at Skowhegan School of Painting and Sculpture, Madison, Maine (2013) (resident faculty); Versailles Foundation Munn Artists Program, Giverny, France (2011); Anderson Ranch Arts Center, Snowmass Village, Colorado (2010) (painting faculty); Studio Museum in Harlem, New York (2003); Vermont Studio Center, Johnson, Vermont (2001); and Yale Norfolk Summer of Music and Art, Norfolk, Connecticut (1999).

== Notable works in public collections ==
- Panthera (2002), Studio Museum in Harlem, New York
- Instant Gratification (from Brawling Spitfire Wrestling series) (2005), Rubell Museum, Miami/Washington, D.C.
- Rumble (from Brawling Spitfire Wrestling series) (2005), Art Institute of Chicago
- Mama Bush II, Keep the Home Fires Burnin' (2006), Rubell Museum, Miami/Washington, D.C.
- Remember Me (2006), Yale University Art Gallery, New Haven, Connecticut
- Can't We Just Sit Down and Talk It Over? (2006–2007), Art Institute of Chicago; and Studio Museum in Harlem, New York
- A Little Taste Outside of Love (2007), Brooklyn Museum, New York
- Lovely Six Foota (2007), International Center of Photography, New York
- Madame Mama Bush in Black and White (2007), Brooklyn Museum, New York
- Sista Sista Lady Blue (2007), San Francisco Museum of Modern Art
- Oprah Winfrey (2007–2008), National Portrait Gallery, Smithsonian Institution, Washington, D.C.
- Din Avec la Main Dans le Miroir (2008), Pennsylvania Academy of the Fine Arts, Philadelphia
- Michelle O (2008), Baltimore Museum of Art; Museum of Fine Arts, Boston; and National Portrait Gallery, Smithsonian Institution, Washington, D.C.
- A Moment's Pleasure in Black and White (2008), Whitney Museum, New York
- Portrait of Qusuquzah (2008), Minneapolis Institute of Art
- A-E-I-O-U and Sometimes Y (2009), National Museum of Women in the Arts, Washington, D.C.
- Ain't I A Woman (Keri) (2009), Museum of Modern Art, New York
- I Learned the Hard Way (2010), Montreal Museum of Fine Arts
- Le déjeuner sur l'herbe: Les Trois Femmes Noires (2010), Baltimore Museum of Art
- Portrait of Mnonja (2010), Smithsonian American Art Museum, Smithsonian Institution, Washington, D.C.
- You're Gonna Give Me the Love I Need (2010), Allen Memorial Art Museum, Oberlin, Ohio
- Melody: Back (2011), National Gallery of Art, Washington, D.C.
- Qusuquzah, une très belle négresse 1 (2011), San Francisco Museum of Modern Art
- Portrait of Marie Sitting in Black and White (2012), Pennsylvania Academy of the Fine Arts, Philadelphia
- Sleep: Deux Femmes Noires (2013), Museum of Fine Arts, Boston
- Hair Portrait #20 (2014), Seattle Art Museum
- Racquel: Come to Me (2016), Whitney Museum, New York
- Resist #2 (2021), Baltimore Museum of Art
- Guernica (Resist #3) (2021), Crystal Bridges Museum of American Art, Bentonville, Arkansas

== Personal life ==
Thomas is an out lesbian. Her former partner, collaborator, and long-time artistic subject is Racquel Chevremont. With Chevremont, Thomas founded The Josie Club, a support network for queer female artists of color to help support, fundraise and sponsor their work. Thomas and Chevremont separated in 2020 after a decade together.
