= Kojo Griffin =

American artist

Kojo Griffin (born 1971 in Farmville, VA), is an American visual artist. He has had solo exhibitions in the US, including Two with the New York gallery Mitchell-Innes & Nash.

He has displayed his work extensively in group shows in the United States and in other parts of the world. Griffin has been invited to universities as a visiting artist. Some of these universities are; The Massachusetts College of Art & Design, University of Illinois at Chicago, SUNY-New Paltz, etc.

Griffin's work was described as "art that engages people in a personal (internal) dialogue". He usually features fantastic creatures in his artworks.

Griffin's artworks have been shown at the 2000 Whitney Biennial and the 2003 Corcoran Gallery of Art Biennial. His art is represented in the collections of the Whitney Museum of American Art, The Studio Museum in Harlem, and the Brooklyn Museum, and has appeared in Art in America and The New York Times.

== Career and education ==
Griffin was born in Farmville, Virginia in 1971. However, he grew up in Boston.

He got his B.A. Psychology, Morehouse College, Atlanta, GA.

The New York modern and contemporary art gallery, Mitchell-Innes & Nash presented the first solo exhibition in New York city for Griffin from September 6 through October 13, 2001. This art exhibition was Griffin's first solo exhibition in New York City.

Griffin's charcoal on paper artwork appeared in the Whitney Museum of American Art in 2000.

Griffin's works were exhibited in the Freestyle Exhibition at The Studio Museum in 2001.
