= Arnold J. Kemp =

American artist

- Born: Boston, Massachusetts
- Awards: John Simon Guggenheim Memorial Foundation Fellowship, Pollock Krasner Grant, Joan Mitchell Foundation Fellowship
- Website: www.a-j-kemp.com

Arnold J. Kemp is an American artist who works in painting, print, sculpture, and poetry. After graduating from Boston Latin School, Kemp received a BA/BFA from Tufts University and the School of the Museum of Fine Arts Boston, and an MFA from Stanford University.

From 1991 to 2005, Kemp lived and worked in San Francisco, CA, where he showed works independently and was a curator at Yerba Buena Center for the Arts. More recently, he was chair of the MFA in Visual Studies at Pacific Northwest College of Art PNCA in Portland, Oregon. He also served as Painting and Printmaking Chair & Associate Professor at the School of the Arts, Virginia Commonwealth University. Currently he is Dean of Graduate studies at School of the Art Institute of Chicago and Professor of Painting and Drawing.

== Work ==
In 2001, he first showed work in New York at the Studio Museum's Freestyle Exhibition. The "Freestyle" exhibition was discussed in the context of the post-black art movement, a moment where black artists confronted and abandoned the label of being 'black' artists. In 2022 Kemp exhibited new work at both M. LeBlanc Gallery and the Neubauer Collegium in Chicago, IL. For both exhibitions the work continued the themes of masking and the use of aluminum foil.

Significant works of Kemp's are in the collections of the Metropolitan Museum of Art, The Studio Museum in Harlem, The Berkeley Art Museum, The Portland Art Museum, The Tacoma Art Museum, the Fine Arts Collection at the University of California, Davis, and the Frances Lehman Loeb Art Center at Vassar College.

In 2012, Kemp was awarded a Fellowship from the John Simon Guggenheim Memorial Foundation. Kemp has also received awards from the Joan Mitchell Foundation, the Pollock-Krasner Foundation, Artadia, Art Matters, and Printed Matter, Inc.

== Content of Artwork ==
The aluminum foil has been a key material in Kemp's works. Many of the objects that Kemp has created with foil have taken the form of "masks"—expanses of fractalized sheet foil with holes that resemble eyes and mouths. At times, Kemp also produces the foils as color photographs. In this form, they fill their frames such that the only edges the viewer see become dark orifices; Kemp has produced these images in varying sizes, including some as tall as dressing mirrors.

== Exhibitions ==
- KSMOCA, Portland, OR 2019
- Fourteen 30 Contemporary, Portland, OR 2018
- May 68/Martos Gallery, New York, NY, 2018
- Biquini Wax, Mexico City, Mexico 2017
- Iceberg Projects, Chicago, IL 2017
- Cherry & Lucic, Portland, OR 2016
- Soloway, Brooklyn, NY 2015
- PDX Contemporary, Portland, OR (2009 & 2010)
- Patricia Sweetow Gallery, San Francisco (2009)
- Envoy, New York (2008)
- TBA Festival/ Portland Institute of Contemporary Art, Portland, Oregon (2007)
- Stephen Wirtz Gallery, San Francisco (2006)
- Quotidian Gallery, San Francisco (2002)
- Debs & Co., New York (2001)
- ESP, San Francisco (1998)
