= Jeff Sonhouse =

- Born: Jeffrey T. Sonhouse; 1968 (age 57–58); New York City, New York, U.S.
- Education: School of Visual Arts, Hunter College Marshall University
- Occupation: painter

Jeff Sonhouse (born 1968) is an American painter, known for his mixed media portraiture dealing with Black identity. He is African American.

== Biography ==
Sonhouse was born in 1968, in New York City, New York. He attended college the School of Visual Arts, where he received a B.F.A. degree in 1998; followed study at Hunter College, where he received a M.F.A. degree in 2001.

Sonhouse paints portraits, often of Black men which address topics of identity. Sonhouse stated, “I paint the black male figure because it’s mine” and “That’s who I am.” His portraits have embellishments and details such as jeweled suits, jewelry and masks; and Sonhouse will sometimes collages into the canvas using mixed media such as glitter, or beads. Some of his portraits are of political figures or reference historical jazz record covers. His painting, The Son of the Hypocrite (2008), references African history and culture.

In 2002, Sonhouse had his first solo exhibition, Tailored Larceny, at Kustera Tilton Gallery. His work was included in the three-part group exhibition, Legacies: Contemporary Artists Reflect on Slavery (2006), at the New-York Historical Society.

Sonhouse's work is included in public museum collections at the Studio Museum in Harlem, the Nasher Museum of Art, the Nelson-Atkins Museum of Art, and the Rubell Museum.

In 2010, Sonhouse had his first solo exhibition in Los Angeles, California at Martha Otero his exhibit was tilted, Better Off Dead, Said the Landlord.
