= Charles Bénézit =

French musician, writer, and music teacher

Marc Charles Constant Bénézit (French: [benezi]; 23 November 1815 – 10 July 1900) was a French musician, writer, and music teacher.

== Biography ==
Bénézit was born in 1819 in Rennes, Ille-et-Vilaine. He was a friend and publishing collaborator in Brittany of the young Leconte de Lisle, two years his junior, and the humourist M. Mille in Brittany. He later wrote the musical Jacquerie. Leconte's correspondence contains twelve letters to Charles, mainly from 1845 to 1847. With Leconte de Lisle's encouragement, M. Mille wrote the comic text and Charles Bénézit the music for two vaudevilles, Les Mémoires d'une puce de qualité (une puce de Napoléon Ier!) and L'Orphelin, roman musical.

Later he became a close friend of Victor Hugo. When Napoléon III seized power in 1851, many French were exiled to Jersey; Charles and his family, marked as being "from France" were recorded in the Jersey census in 1851, and still in the 1861 and 1871 censuses. Victor Hugo had gone first to Brussels, but in 1855 joined other exiles in Jersey. Bénézit became close and permanent friends with Hugo and maintained the friendship after Hugo returned to France in 1870.

In 1840, he married Euphrosine Marie Perrine Boulangé. They had eight children, including art historian Emmanuel Bénézit.
