= Benezit Dictionary of Artists =

French biographical dictionary (1911–1999)

The Benezit Dictionary of Artists (in French, Bénézit: Dictionnaire des peintres, sculpteurs, dessinateurs et graveurs) is an extensive publication of bibliographical information on painters, sculptors, designers and engravers created primarily for art museums, auction houses, historians and dealers. It was published by Éditions Gründ in Paris but has been sold to Oxford University Press.

== History ==
First published in the French language in three volumes between 1911 and 1923, the dictionary was put together by Emmanuel Bénézit (1854–1920) and a team of international specialists with assistance from his son the painter Emmanuel-Charles Bénézit (1887–1975), and daughter Marguerite Bénézit. After the elder Bénézit's death the editors were Edmond-Henri Zeiger-Viallet (1895–1994) and the painter Jacques Busse (1922–2004), the younger Bénézit having already left Paris and moved to Provence. The next edition was an eight-volume set published between 1948 and 1955, followed by a ten-volume set in 1976 and a 14-volume set in 1999. In 2006, an English-language edition was published for the first time. A 14-volume set, it has more than 20,000 pages, with over 170,000 entries.

As of 2024, the editor-in-chief is Valerie Cassel Oliver (from 2020). Since the move to Oxford University Press, advisory editors and editors-in-chief have been Stephen J. Bury (2011–14) and Kathy Battista (2015–2019).

== Online biographies ==
Since 2011, for a fee, the content of the Benezit can be accessed online at Oxford Art Online. Free access is available for members of some UK public libraries.

== Editions ==
=== French ===
- Benezit Dictionnaire des Peintres, Sculpteurs, Dessinateurs, et Graveurs. Oxford University Press. 2010. ISBN 978-0199773794. (14 volumes)
- Dictionnaire critique & documentaire des peintres sculpteurs dessinateurs & graveurs. Gründ/Hilmarton Manor Press. 1999. ISBN 9782700030105. (14 volumes)
- Dictionnaire critique et documentaire des peintres, sculpteurs, dessinateurs et graveurs de tous les temps et de tous les pays. Gründ. 1976. ISBN 9782700001495. (10 volumes)

=== English ===
- Benezit Dictionary of Artists. Oxford University Press. 2010. ISBN 978-0199773787. (14 volumes)
- Benezit Dictionary of Artists. Librairie Gründ. 2006. ISBN 978-2700030709. (14 volumes)
- The Benezit Dictionary of British Graphic Artists and Illustrators (Oxford University Press, 2012, two volumes)
