= Louis Cameron =

Australian cricketer (born 1992)

Personal information
- Full name: Louis Donald Buckley Cameron
- Born: 21 May 1992 (age 34); Belconnen, Canberra
- Batting: Right-handed
- Bowling: Right arm fast-medium

Domestic team information
- Years: Team
- 2012–13: Victoria
- FC debut: 2 August 2012 Victoria v NSW

Career statistics
Competition	FC
Matches	2
Runs scored	5
Batting average	1.66
100s/50s	0/0
Top score	4*
Balls bowled	228
Wickets	3
Bowling average	55.33
5 wickets in innings	–
10 wickets in match	–
Best bowling	3/61
Catches/stumpings	0/–
- Source: , 26 August 2022

Louis Cameron (born 21 May 1992) is an Australian former first class cricketer for the Victoria cricket team. He played as a right-handed batsman and a right arm fast-medium bowler.

== Career ==
Cameron made his Sheffield Shield debut in the 2012–13 season when he was awarded a rookie professional contract. Cameron finished with 3/61 from 19 overs on his debut against New South Wales at the Sydney Cricket Ground before also playing against South Australia but going wicket less.

== Post-playing career ==
Pursuing career in journalism, Cameron has worked for Cricket Australia's digital media team. Cameron has written for Cricket Network.
