= Lisa Dent Gallery =

Coordinates: 37.79056°N 122.4276°W

Lisa Dent Gallery was a contemporary art gallery located in San Francisco, California.

== History ==
Curator, dealer and gallerist, Lisa Dent founded her gallery in 2004. It was first located at 666 Mission Street, across from the Cartoon Art Museum and around the corner from SF MoMA. In September 2007 the gallery moved to 2101 Sacramento Street, around the corner from Anthony Meier Fine Arts. The gallery closed in 2008.

== Exhibitions ==
The gallery represented emerging American and international artists, including notable artists' first solo exhibitions. In 2004 the gallery exhibited one of Hank Willis Thomas's first solo shows. His show "Unbranded: Reflections in Black by Corporate America" was also featured at Lisa Dent Gallery in 2006. The series used photographs from magazine ads to parody the appropriation of black bodies for commercial use. In 2005, the gallery present the work of Japanese mixed-media artist, Makoto Aida in his first solo exhibition in the United States. The installation entitled "Drink SAKE Alone" included video, sculpture, and painting to examine themes of sexuality, terrorism, and modern-day Japanese culture as international export. In the fall of 2007, the gallery presented “Sicknesses of the Spirit,” a series of graphite drawings by Candice Lin. The work evoked 19th century ethnographic photography, combining historical record with the occult to critique our cultural understandings of race and gender.

== Represented Artists ==
- Makoto Aida
- Jon Brumit
- Thomas Chang
- Matthew Cusick
- Ala Ebtekar
- Marcia Kure
- Candice Lin
- Flo McGarrell
- Ryan Pierce
- Shane Aslan Selzer
- Maiko Sugano
- Tim Sullivan
- Hank Willis Thomas
- Basil Twist
- Robin Ward
