= Éditions Gründ =

French publishing company

- Parent company: Editis
- Founded: 1880
- Founders: Ernest Gründ and Émile Maguet
- Country of origin: France
- Publication types: Books
- Nonfiction topics: Art
- Official website: www.lisez.com/grund/29

Librairie Gründ, also known as "Les éditions Gründ", is a French publishing company. It was started in 1880 by Ernest Gründ and Émile Maguet as a bookstore in Paris, specializing in works about art. It joined the French publishing group Editis in 2007.

Gründ issued the Benezit Dictionary of Artists until 2007, when Oxford University Press began issuing the dictionary.

Benezit has been called "the definitive international directory of artists" by The New York Times.

Some of the authors published by this group include Pierre Augustin Caron de Beaumarchais, Sophie Rostopchine, comtesse de Ségur, Siri Reuterstrand, Jean-Francois Mesplède, Jean-Pierre Délarge, and classics by Rabelais, etc.
