= Adler Guerrier =

Haitian American visual artist

- Born: Port-au-Prince, Haiti
- Education: New World School of the Arts

Adler Guerrier (born 1975, Port-au-Prince, Haiti) is a visual artist working in photography, drawing, collage, and printmaking to comment on issues of place and identity. Guerrier lives and works in Miami, United States.

== Education and Career ==
Adler Guerrier holds a Bachelor of Arts from New World School of the Arts, Miami. He was an Artist in Residence at Oolite Arts, Miami, in 2018 and 2021, and currently has a studio at Bakehouse Art Complex, in the Wynwood neighborhood. In 2021, Guerrier was commissioned by For Freedoms to produce a billboard for the Miami Design District.

Guerrier's artistic practice combines walks and archival practice to expand on ideas of place and belonging. Publications about his work include Adler Guerrier: Scenes from a Verdant Place (2014), published by Name Publications; and Adler Guerrier: Formulating a Plot (2014), published by Pérez Art Museum Miami.

In 2014, Adler Guerrier presented his first mid-career survey at the Pérez Art Museum Miami. The exhibition Adler Guerrier: Formulating a Plot, showcased a large number of photographs, sculptures, drawings, prints, and collage work to contextualize Miami not only as a geographical site but also as a nuanced sociocultural territory through its arts production, politics, urban and natural landscapes.

== Exhibitions (selection) ==
Adler Guerrier have had the following solo exhibitions Adler Guerrier: Conditions and Forms for blck Longevity (2018) at the California African American Museum, Los Angeles; and Adler Guerrier: Formulating a Plot (2014) at the Pérez Art Museum Miami, Florida.

International group presentations include the 2008 Whitney Biennial, New York; and the XXIII Bienal Arte Paiz, in Guatemala, in 2023.

== Collections (selection) ==
- Pérez Art Museum Miami, Florida
- Institute of Contemporary Art Miami, Florida
- Museum of Contemporary Art, North Miami
- Studio Museum in Harlem, New York
- Walker Art Center, Minneapolis
