= Nyame Brown =

American artist

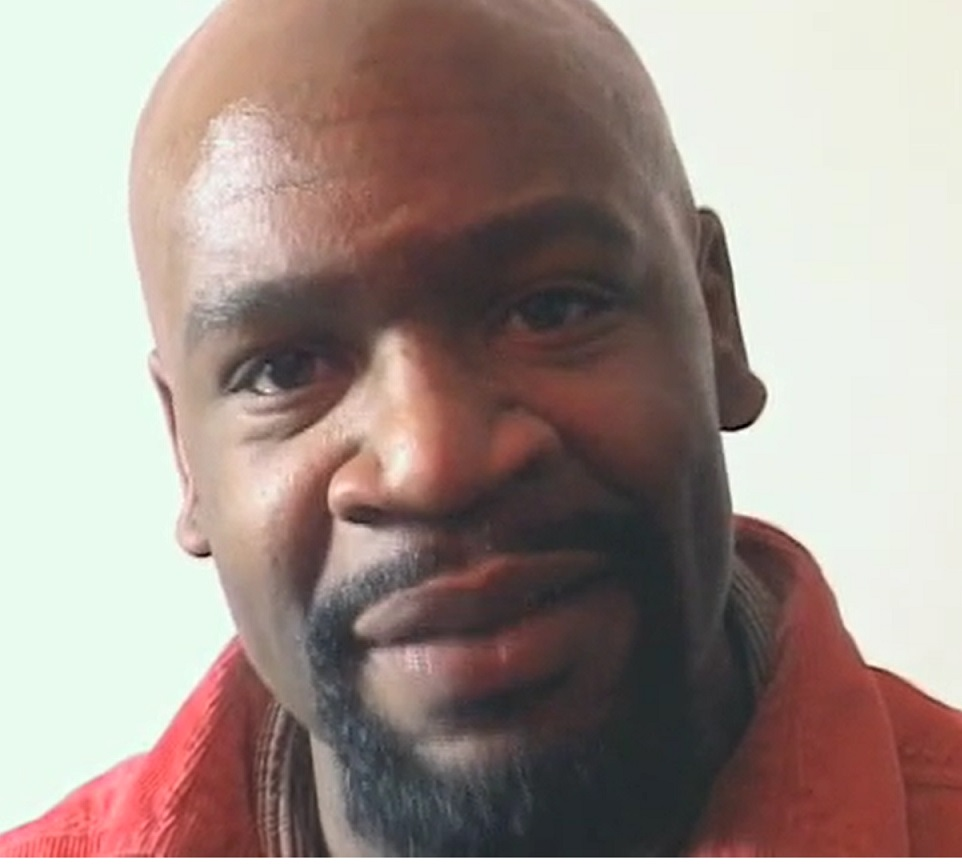
- Occupation: Artist
- Years active: The School of the Art Institute of Chicago, Yale University School of Art

Nyame Brown is an artist from San Francisco, CA whose multimedia work explores the intermingling of African-American pop culture and the larger African Diaspora. He received his BFA from The School of the Art Institute of Chicago and his MFA from Yale University School of Art in 1997. He is currently a faculty member at the Oakland School of the Arts and has previously held positions at St. Mary's College of California, Notre Dame University, Illinois State University, and The Art Institute of Chicago. He is the recipient of the Richard Driehaus Foundation Individual Artist Award (1997 & 2002) and the Joan Mitchell Foundation grant (2003). He was the Joan Mitchell Center Artist-in-Residence in Spring 2016.

Curator and art critic Julie Joyce wrote about his works for the 2006 "Frequency" exhibition at the Studio Museum in Harlem, stating that Brown "fuses multifarious time zones and cultures much like a DJ" and described Nyame Brown as a 21st-Century Griot for his use of history and mythology in his narrative art.

Nyame Brown has devoted much of his time to non-profit and educational programs for young people. In particular, he has worked for Anchor Graphics, which specializes in outreach to teach printmaking in the public schools, and Gallery 37 a City of Chicago program that provides artist mentorship programs for students in city schools.

== Selected exhibitions and residencies ==
- "Classroom in Nevérÿon" Oct 26, 2016-Jan 16, 2017, Emerging Artist Program, MoAD Museum of the African Diaspora, San Francisco, CA.
- "Indivisible: Spirits in the Material World" Nov 30-Dec 1 2016. PRIZM Art Fair, Miami, FL
- "Wonder Twin Powers" | Curated by James Jankowiak. Oct 7, 2016-Mar 2017. The West Wall, Chicago, IL
- Artist in Residence, Spring 2016, Joan Mitchell Center, New Orleans, LA
- "Pop Up Exhibition" Feb 24-March 23, 2014, Art Complex, Oakland, CA
- "Frequency" Nov 11, 2005-March 12, 2006. Studio Museum in Harlem, New York, NY
