= Senam Okudzeto =

American and British artist and educator (born 1972)

- Born: 1972 (age 53–54); Chicago U.S.A
- Education: Slade School of Fine Art Royal College of Art The Whitney Independent Study Program (ISP) Birkbeck College
- Occupations: Artist, writer, lecturer, curator

Senam Okudzeto (born 1972) is an American and British artist and educator who lives and works in Basel, London, and New York City.

== Life and work ==
Okudzeto was born in Chicago, to an American mother and Ghanaian father and grew up between London, Chicago and Lagos. She received a bachelor's degree from the Slade School of Fine Art in 1995 and a master's degree from the Royal College of Art in 1997. Okudzeto continued with post-graduate studies in the Whitney Independent Study Program (ISP) at the Whitney Museum of American Art, the Radcliffe Institute for Advanced Studies, Harvard University and earned a doctorate in the field of Humanities and Cultural Studies from the London Consortium and Birkbeck, University of London in 2022.

Her work incorporates writing, scholarly research and art practice within a wide range of mediums, including painting, film, installation and social sculpture to articulate her methodological practice of "Afro-Dada". It explores global connectivity, modernity, and the relationships between Africa, the diasporas, and the rest of the world. Her work forges narrative connections between unexpected vectors, an ongoing exploration of identity politics, material culture and critical responses to previously overlooked socio-economic and political histories. Her installations are designed to represent forgotten or unnoticed forms of material and architectural culture as carriers of lost or hidden histories, especially stories about the genesis of contemporary West Africa and its diaspora. Interwoven into these broader themes are ideas such as economics as an archive of social relations and readings of Lacan in relation to race, performance and the gendered body. Okudzeto's practice locates unexpected juxtapositions in the material culture of post-independence West Africa's modernist narratives and her identity as a West African who is also a European and of U.S. American descent.

Okudzeto has published a number of texts and peer reviewed essays and has served on the editorial board of the CAA publication Art Journal (2005–2009) and taught in a range of diverse fields, including African studies, art, architectural history at a wide range of institutions including The Kunsthistorisches Seminar, University of Basel (2015), at Harvard University (2004), Loyola University, Occidental College and the Hochschule für Gestaltung in Basel, Switzerland as well as institutions across Europe, West Africa and the USA.

She was the 2018–2019 Visiting Professor at L'École nationale supérieure d'arts de Paris-Cergy (ENSAPC), where she taught a theoretical graduate research seminar "Counter-Histories of a Continent; Making, Mapping, Recovering and Reviewing" which "instead of outlining an "African Art History" (asked) students (to) examine a history of Africa as constructed by artists, writers, musicians and filmmakers. This paradigm shift in research methodology attempts to "counter" stereotypes through an analysis of constructions of the image of Africa in the past 100 years, artifacts made both in and outside the geographical boundaries of the continent".

Since 1998, Okudzeto has developed the 'conceptual drawing' workshops incorporating practical and theoretical approaches to drawing, most recently taught at Ecole Nationale Supérieure d'Arts de Paris-Cergy (ENSAPC), The University of Nigeria, Nsukka and Yaba College of Technology as part of the international exchange program she organized as the ENSAPC visiting professor during 2018 and 2019.

She is the founder and administrative Director of the partially-dormant NGO Art in Social Structures (AiSS), a donor member society run and funded by artists with the aim of creating and supporting heritage initiatives in Ghana. As Director of AiSS she co-organised and chaired Across the Board, a two-year project by Tate Modern in Ghana (2013–2014) that "provides an organic and experimental platform for emerging artists and explores recent artistic practices in Africa and its Diaspora", realized in collaboration with curator Elvira Dyangani Osei and the Nubuke foundation Ghana. She also served as a board member on the Global Agenda Council for the Role of the Arts in Society at the World Economic Forum, Geneva (2012–2014). In 2023 She was awarded the Paul Boesch Prize, one of the highest endowed prizes in Switzerland for her "socio-politcally relevant work".

== Residencies and awards ==
Okudzeto has been artist in residence at the Studio Museum in Harlem (2000-2001) and the Stiftung Laurenz Haus in Basel (2002) and the BINZ39 residency in Zurich (2003). She was a fellow at the Radcliffe Institute for Advanced Study at Harvard University from 2003 to 2004. Okudzeto received a Pollock-Krasner Award in 2002 and was awarded the work-grant from Kunstkredit Basel-Stadt in 2005 and again in 2018

She was awarded the Edith Bloom/Jesse Howard Junior Rome Prize fellowship at the American Academy in Rome, 2015–2016, for her project "Afro-Dada Glossolalia". In 2017 she received a grant from the Graham Foundation for Advanced Studies for her project Geomancy, Modernity and Memory, Unofficial and Unrecognized Historic Civic Centers in Ghana.

== Exhibitions ==
- 2001: Freestyle, The Studio Museum in Harlem, curated by Thelma Golden, New York, USA
- 2001: For the Record: Julie Mehretu, Senam Okudzeto and Nadine Robinson, The Studio Museum in Harlem, NYC, USA
- 2003: Fiction ou Realite: Goddy Leye, Omer Fast, Senam Okudzeto, Kunsthalle Fribourg, Switzerland
- 2003: Black President: The Art and Legacy of Fela Anikulapo Kuti, New Museum, New York, USA, traveled to: Barbican Center, London (2004); Yerba Buena Center for the Arts, San Francisco (2004)
- 2005: Africa Remix, curated by Simon Njami, Marie-Laure Bernadac, Centre Pompidou, Paris, France
- 2006: Dak'art Biennale, Senegal (representing the US and Diaspora), Dakar, Senegal
- 2007: Senam Okudzeto, Portes-Oranges, International Project, PS1 MoMA, NYC, USA
- 2007: Art in Social Structures; Godfried Donkor, Lyle Ashton Harris, Senam Okudzeto, Hawa Nicole Olai, curated by Senam Okudzeto, Alliance Francaise, Accra, Ghana
- 2009: Capitalism and Schizophrenia, Kunstraum Lakeside, Klagenfurt, Austria
- 2011: Dance, Draw, Institute of Contemporary Art Boston, Boston, USA
- 2012: The Progress of Love, curated by Kristina Van Dyke, Bisi Silva and Susan Sutton, Menil Collection, Houston, USA
- 2014: The Politics of Food, Delphina Foundation, London, UK
- 2015: Saltwater: A Theory of Thought Forms, 14th Istanbul Biennale, curated by Carolyn Christov-Bakargiev, Istanbul, Turkey
- 2015: Nero Su Bianco, American Academy in Rome, Italy
- 2016: Cinque Mostre 2016 – Across the Board; Parts of a Whole, Ilaria Gianni with Saverio Verini, American Academy in Rome, Italy
- 2016: Shifting Views: People & Politics in Contemporary African Art, curated by Shannen Hill, with Kevin Tervala, Baltimore Museum of Art, Baltimore, USA
- 2016: Dada Afrika. Dialogue with the Other, Museum Rietberg, Zurich, Switzerland
- 2018: Black Value, curated by Janine Gäelle Dieudji and Justin Randolph Thompson, Fondazione Biagiotti Progetto Arte, Florence, Italy
- 2019: Counter Histories of a Continent, curated by Senam Okudzeto, Alliance Française de Lagos, Ikoyi, Nigeria
- 2019: Blind Date, Kunstkredit Basel-Stadt, curated by Elise Lammer, Kunsthalle Basel, Basel, Switzerland
- 2019: We Wanted the Object to be the Subject (Before We Wanted the Reverse), curated by Claire Hoffmann, Centre culturel suisse, Paris, France
- 2020: Exotic? Switzerland Looking Outward in the Age of Enlightenment, curated by Noémie Etienne, Claire Brizon, Chonja Lee and Etienne Wismer, Palais du Rumine, Lausanne, Switzerland
- 2021 Pathologically Social, curated by Scott Cameron Weaver, O-Townhouse Los Angeles, USA
- 2025: Event Horizons; work from private collections in Ghana and artist’s selection, Nubuke Foundation, Accra, Ghana.

== Writings and publications ==
- Senam Okudzeto, "Lyle Ashton Harris", in: Aperture, issue 218 (Queer), Spring 2015, Aperture Foundation, Inc., New York, pp. 76–83.
- Senam Okudzeto et al., "Feminist Time: A Conversation, Rosalyn Deutsch, Aruna D'Souza, Miwon Kwon, Ulrike Müller, Mignon Nixon, Senam Okudzeto", in: Grey Room, Spring 2008, No. 31, Inc. and the Massachusetts Institute of Technology, pp. 32–67.
- Senam Okudzeto, "Emotive Histories; The Politics of Remembering Slavery in Contemporary Ghana", in: Atlantic Studies, Vol. 9, Issue 3, Routledge, 2012, pp. 337–361.
- Senam Okudzeto, "Remembering African Cities: Rethinking Urban Conservation as Radical Public History", in: Historic Cities: Issues in Urban Conservation, Eds. Cody & Siravo, Readings in Conservation Series, The Getty Conservation Institute, Los Angeles, 2019.
- Senam Okudzeto "Refusing the Tautological Return", JSAH Roundtable: Constructing Race and Architecture (1400–1800), Part 2, Journal of the Society of Architectural Historians, (2021) Vol.80 (4): pp. 409–410
- Senam Okudzeto "Does the Plantation End When the Market Begins", in Nana Adusei Poku, (ed.) Reshaping the Field, Art of the African Diasporas on Display. Exhibition Histories 13. Published by Afterall in association with Asia Art Archive; the Center for Curatorial Studies at Bard College; and the Faculty of Fine, Applied and Performing Arts, University of Gothenburg. Cornerhouse, 2022
