= Jennie C. Jones =

American artist (born 1968)

- Born: 1968 (age 57–58); Cincinnati, Ohio, United States
- Education: School of the Art Institute of Chicago (BFA); Mason Gross School of the Arts, Rutgers University (MFA)
- Known for: Sound art, painting, sculpture
- Website: https://www.jenniecjones.com/

Jennie C. Jones (born 1968) is an American artist best known for her abstract works in painting, sculpture, and sound art. Much of Jones's work is inspired by minimalism and color field painting, along with jazz and avant-garde music.

As an artist, she connects most of her work between visual art and sound. Such connections are made with multiple mediums, from paintings to sculptures and paper to audio collages. Jones has won an array of prizes and grants for her work, including the Joyce Alexander Wien Prize in 2012.

== Early life and education ==
Jennie C. Jones was born in 1968 in Cincinnati, Ohio, and she grew up in the city. Her mother Sylvia Jones was an export logistics manager for Procter & Gamble, and her father Byron Paul Jones worked as a radio engineer for the Cincinnati–area station WLW after previously co–owning a jazz radio station in San Antonio. Growing up, Jones was exposed to a broad variety of music by her parents, particularly from her mother's record collection. Jones was made to take piano and violin lessons as a child by her parents; although she was able to play compositions immediately after hearing them, she refused to learn to read music and soon quit the lessons.

Jones received a BFA from the School of the Art Institute of Chicago in 1991. While an undergraduate, Jones became interested in abstract artists like Ellsworth Kelly, Agnes Martin, and Piet Mondrian. She was particularly inspired by seeing Kelly's minimalist paintings installed at the Art Institute of Chicago in 1989. She then attended the Mason Gross School of the Arts at Rutgers University, earning an MFA in 1996. In the summer of 1996, Jones was a participant at the Skowhegan School of Painting and Sculpture. After earning her graduate degree, Jones moved to Brooklyn, New York, eventually settling in Fort Greene.

== Life and career ==
=== 2000s ===
Jones was included in curator Thelma Golden's exhibition Freestyle in 2001, a group show at the Studio Museum in Harlem that helped introduce the concept of post-blackness and post-black art to a broader audience. She exhibited a wall piece titled Homage to an Unknown Suburban Black Girl featuring an image of a child with an afro, set within a grid similar to the art of Mondrian.

In 2006, the nonprofit gallery Artists Space in New York staged a solo exhibition of Jones's work, Simply Because You're Near Me. In addition to several abstract geometric collage drawings resembling microphones and speakers, Jones installed a sound work in the gallery playing from two different sources, featuring an edited version of jazz musician Dean Benedetti's distorted amateur recordings of various performances by musician Charlie Parker, whom Benedetti had come to obsess over. Jones was awarded a Creative Capital grant to support her work in 2008. She also received the William H. Johnson Prize the same year, a grant for African–American artists awarded by the William H. Johnson Foundation.

In 2009, Jones mounted a solo exhibition at the Atlanta Contemporary Art Center, Red, Bird, Blue. She exhibited several works on paper and sculptures referencing jazz musicians and abstract artists like Dizzy Gillespie and Ellsworth Kelly. One room in the exhibition included monochromatic wall paintings and a sound installation of collaged jazz performances mixed with the call of the northern oriole.

=== 2010s ===
Jones staged Electric in 2010, a solo exhibition at the gallery Sikkema Jenkins & Co in New York. Jones created a sound work for the show featuring one minute of the Miles Davis song "In a Silent Way" from the album of the same name, slowed down and extended to the length of John Cage's composition 4′33″, playing from iPods in two adjacent rooms. She also created sculptural installations of CD racks full of empty jewel cases and sculptures comprising tangled and stretched audio cables plugged into walls.

In 2011, Jones began her Acoustic Paintings series, minimalist monochromatic painted works made on fabric acoustic panels often used to dampen sounds or echoes in recording or performance spaces. The same year, she presented several of these paintings in the solo show Absorb/Diffuse at the art space The Kitchen in New York; many of the paintings also had bright strips of color embedded within the compositions but only visible from certain angles. She also presented the sound piece From The Low, a collage of samples from a variety of compositions including works by Charles Mingus, Sergei Prokofiev, Johann Sebastian Bach, Ray Brown, and Arvo Pärt. Many of the snippets are so-called micro-samples, or samples of individual notes or musical phrases rather than entire melodies. Writing for BOMB magazine, musician Stephen Vitiello suggested that the samples had been "given a new context, perhaps to be classified in a category of black minimalism".

The Hirshhorn Museum and Sculpture Garden in Washington, D.C., mounted Higher Resonance in 2013, Jones's first solo museum exhibition. In addition to thirteen new Acoustic Paintings and small sculptures, Jones created a new audio work, also titled Higher Resonance, featuring short samples of music by black classical composers and jazz musicians mixed together.

In 2014, Jones presented the sound work Piccolo Largo in a group exhibition at Wave Hill in New York. The piece features a high-pitched piccolo playing against a very low-pitched tuba. The same year, she mounted a solo exhibition at Sikkema Jenkins in New York titled Tone, where she exhibited a sound installation made of slowed-down snippets from performances by trombonist and arranger Melba Liston, as well as several new Acoustic Paintings.

Jones staged another solo exhibition with Sikkema Jenkins in New York in 2015, Amplitude, where she showed seven Acoustic Paintings along with a new sound work. The sound piece, Red, Cue, Disruption, was a reworking of a previous piece comprising collaged recordings of drummer Elvin Jones. In December 2015, Compilation, a 10-year survey of Jones's work curated by Valerie Cassel Oliver, opened at the Contemporary Arts Museum Houston. In addition to twenty two of her Acoustic Paintings, Jones showed a number of works on paper, sculptures, and an ambient sound installation titled Variant Static, a compilation of spliced recordings Jones sourced from a woman selling her father's record collection. She also installed a listening room for viewers to hear fourteen of her other audio works on a looped recording. Writing about the exhibition for the Houston Chronicle, Molly Glentzer called it "a little bit Barnett Newman meets Charlie Parker".

In February 2018 Jones opened a solo exhibition, alternate takes, at Patron Gallery in Chicago, her first solo exhibition in the city where she attended college. She showed several Acoustic Paintings and works on paper, as well as a site-specific painting and sound installation titled Final Take: Same Bridge on the Syncopated which featured a recording of a studio session by jazz pianist Ramsey Lewis, edited to only include the moments when Lewis was not playing. Jones created a site-responsive commission titled RPM (revolutions per minute) the same year for the Philip Johnson-designed Glass House in New Canaan, Connecticut. The installation included a sound piece produced in part with glass and singing bowls, along with several works on paper.

Jones also moved from Brooklyn to Hudson, New York, in 2018 after two decades in the city.

=== 2020s ===
In 2020, Jones staged a solo exhibition at the Germantown, New York, branch of the gallery Alexander Gray Associates, showing several geometric abstract paintings on fabric acoustic panels and canvas. The same year, she was included in the outdoor group exhibition Ground/work at the Clark Art Institute in Williamstown, Massachusetts. Jones's sculpture for the show, These (Mournful) Shores, consisted of a wall–height minimalist interpretation of an Aeolian harp with strings that audibly responded to the wind and weather. The work was inspired by several Winslow Homer paintings owned by the Clark as well as the experiences of enslaved people in the Middle Passage.

Jones mounted a solo exhibition at Alexander Gray's New York location in September 2021, New Compositions, presenting a range of new Acoustic Paintings, some of which featured architectural felt in addition to acoustic panel fabrics. Several of the paintings included bright strips or patches of color hidden behind the felt or acoustic panels that were only visible from certain angles. She also presented a number of musical score collages with abstracted musical notations. Jones participated in the fifth edition of the Prospect New Orleans triennial, also in 2021, exhibiting in a two-artist show with Glenn Ligon in an unused library annex in the Ogden Museum of Southern Art. Accompanying Ligon's neon artworks commemorating the dates of removal of Confederate monuments and memorials in New Orleans, Jones installed a sound piece comprising gospel choir recordings of the civil rights anthem "A City Called Heaven", often associated with Mahalia Jackson, set against an original composition by Jones of drone sounds, bells, and snippets of works by experimental composer Alvin Singleton.

In 2022 Jones staged Dynamics, a solo exhibition of new work at the Solomon R. Guggenheim Museum in New York, in tandem with a retrospective of abstract artist Wassily Kandinsky. She installed a series of Acoustic Paintings on the first two levels of the Guggenheim's spiral ramp along with several works on paper. Jones presented a sound installation on the top floor of the museum titled Oculus Tone, a largely ambient composition that filtered into the rest of the museum building.

Jones was commissioned by the Metropolitan Museum of Art in 2025 for the museum's annual roof garden installation. She created three red metal sound sculptures, collectively titled Ensemble, which were enlarged, geometric interpretations of historical instruments like the diddley bow, zither, and Aeolian harp. The works emitted distinct sounds as wind blew through their strings on the roof. The curator, Lauren Rosati, said the show was part of her aim to introduce viewers to art in mediums like sound and video.

In September 2025, the Pulitzer Arts Foundation in St. Louis staged a survey exhibition of Jones's work, A Line When Broken Begins Again.

== Style and analysis ==
Jones is a visual and sonic artist whose paintings, sculptures, and works on paper incorporate ideas around minimalism, abstraction, jazz, and Black history. Oliver noted in her “Outside The Lines” catalogue essay, that “working in painting as well as sound, she has mined the politics, culture and aesthetic innovations of the mid-20th century and has emerged with sharp criticisms and astute queries that are now embedded in the work. Jones's work challenges us to understand the frameworks of modernism, which embraced black musical forms but excluded black visual art from its canon".

In the book, Jennie C. Jones: A free and shifting tonal center, she states, "Achieving intimacy with the viewer is important; it happens through surfaces that invite looking - at sides, edges, and hums that are audible but visual".

The audio pieces are constructed using traditional sound editing methodologies and often have their origin in historic recordings. With the amalgamation of industrial acoustic materials, often used in recording studios and listening rooms, Jones's art focuses on building a bridge between two-dimensional works, architecture, and sound. Jennie has stated that "conceptualism allows these different media to occupy the same space.”

== Awards, fellowships, and residencies ==
=== Fellowships and residencies ===
- Rose Art Museum Perlmutter Artist-in-Residence, 2017
- Rauschenberg Residency, Captiva, Florida, 2014
- The Lower East Side Printshop Special Editions Resident, 2011
- Rockefeller Foundation Bellagio Study Center, Italy, 2008
- American Academy in Rome, Italy, Visiting Artist, 2008
- Liguria Study Center for the Arts & Humanities Fellowship in Genova, Italy, 2004
- Cité internationale des arts residency in Paris, 2002–03
- Lower Manhattan Cultural Council Residency World Trade Center, 1999

=== Awards ===
- Heinz Award, 2024
- Joan Mitchell Award Grantee, 2013
- The Joyce Alexander Wein Prize, 2012
- Art Matters Grant, 2012
- Pollock-Krasner Grant Recipient, 2000

== Works in public collections ==
- Walkman Compositions-Sanya (AM-FM) & the Sanyo M-G25 Radio #5 (2008–2009), Studio Museum in Harlem, New York
- Walkman Compositions-Sanya (AM-FM) & the Sanyo M-G25 Radio #9 (2008–2009), Studio Museum in Harlem, New York
- End Measure (2011), Los Angeles County Museum of Art
- Semitone–Bar (2011), Los Angeles County Museum of Art
- Components: Left Resonance (2012), Zimmerli Art Museum at Rutgers University, New Brunswick, New Jersey
- Shhh and Electric Clef (2012), Studio Museum in Harlem, New York
- Dark Gray with 1/2 Measure (2013), Solomon R. Guggenheim Museum, New York
- Higher Resonance (2013), Hirshhorn Museum and Sculpture Garden, Smithsonian Institution, Washington, D.C.
- Light Gray with Middle C (variation #2) (2013), Hirshhorn Museum and Sculpture Garden, Smithsonian Institution, Washington, D.C.
- Five Point One Surround (2014), Museum of Modern Art, New York
- Single Channel with Receiver (2016), Museum of Modern Art, New York
- Constant Structure (2020), Pérez Art Museum Miami
- Corner Measure with Red Bar (2023), Metropolitan Museum of Art, New York

== Publications ==
- Jones, Jennie C. (2014). "Jennie C. Jones: Artist Statement". Callaloo, A Journal of African Diaspora Arts and Letters. Vol. 37, no. 4. pp. 899–902. JSTOR 24265063.
- Jones, Jennie C. (2024). Jennie C. Jones: A Free and Shifting Tonal Center. Additional contributions by Deveney, Grace; and Hankins, Evelyn C. Santa Fe, New Mexico: Radius Books. ISBN 9781955161077. OCLC 1380459672.

== Citations and references ==
=== Cited references ===
- Oliver, Valerie Cassel, ed. (2015). Jennie C. Jones: Compilation. Houston / New York: Contemporary Arts Museum Houston / Gregory R. Miller & Co. ISBN 9781941366080. OCLC 936180155.
