= Susan Smith-Pinelo =

African-American artist

- Born: Laie, Hawaii, United States
- Known for: contemporary art, video

Susan Smith-Pinelo is an African-American artist noted for her work in video and performance. She lives and works in Washington, DC.

== Education ==
Smith-Pinelo received a B.F.A. from Oberlin College in 1991. She received a M.F.A. from Columbia University in 2000.

== Work ==
Susan Smith-Pinelo's work challenges conceptions of black identity and gender in rap music, and is particularly concerned with questioning the misogyny of the genre. For example, her 2001 Studio Museum in Harlem installation Sometimes has a close-up video of a black woman's breasts with a necklace saying "ghetto" around her neck dancing to music which sounds through the museum. Sometimes plays with form in order to "confront perceptions of black identity and femininity."

== Awards and fellowships ==
Among the honors which Susan Smith-Pinelo has earned are:

Joan Sovern Sculpture Award (1999)

== Selected exhibitions ==
Susan Smith-Pinelo’s work has been featured in exhibitions at numerous galleries and institutions including:

- Musée d'Art Moderne de la Ville de Paris, Paris, France Playback (2007)
- Zachęta National Gallery of Art, Warsaw, Poland black alphabet (2006)
- Bronx Museum of the Arts, New York City, USA Music/Video (2006)
- Museum Villa Stuck, Munich, Germany One Planet Under A Groove (2003)
- Longwood Arts Project, New York City, USA DL: The "Down Low" in Contemporary Art (2003)
- The Corcoran Gallery of Art, Washington, DC, USA Fantasy Underfoot - The 47th Biennial Exhibition (2002)
- Carnegie Museum of Art, Pittsburg, USA Forum - Hello, My Name Is... (2002)
- Bronx Museum of the Arts, New York City, USA One Planet Under a Grove: Hip Hop and Contemporary Art (2001)
- Los Angeles Contemporary Exhibitions, Los Angeles, USA "Third Annual Altoids Curiously Strong Collection" (2001)
- The Studio Museum in Harlem, New York City, USA Freestyle (2001)

== Collections ==
Smith-Pinelo's work is held in permanent collections including:

- Norton Family Foundation, Los Angeles, USA
- Altoids Curiously Strong Collection/New Museum of Contemporary Art, New York, USA
