= Deborah Grant (artist) =

Canadian-American artist (born 1968)

- Born: 1968 (age 57–58); Toronto, Canada
- Education: Columbia College Chicago (BFA); Tyler School of Art (MFA)
- Occupation: Artist
- Known for: Contemporary art, collage
- Awards: William H. Johnson Prize

Deborah Grant (born 1968) is a Canadian-born African-American artist noted for her work in painting and collage, particularly for her series "Random Select". She lives and works in Harlem, New York.

== Early life and education ==
Grant was born in Toronto, Canada, in 1968, and spent the first four years of her life in Canada. She was raised Catholic and on occasion created Catholic shrines in the abandoned lots of Brooklyn with her brother. Grant received a Bachelor of Fine Arts (BFA) in painting from Columbia College Chicago in 1996. She received a Master of Fine Arts (MFA) from Tyler School of Art in 1999.

After completing her MFA, Grant completed a summer residency at Skowhegan School of Painting and Sculpture in Madison, Maine. From 2002 to 2003, she was an artist-in-residence at the Studio Museum in Harlem.

== Work ==
Grant's works feature fabulist narratives in painting and drawing. Amalgamating images from a variety of sources, ranging from comics to art historical reference books, she creates imagistic stories that investigate cultural identity, race and politics. Ranging from explosive flurries of color and collage to simpler compositions that address singular concepts, Grant explores within her work: "...[T]he idea of constant information bombardment or the chaos in the back of our minds juxtaposed with what is happening physically in front of us."

== Awards and fellowships ==
Deborah Grant was awarded the William H. Johnson Prize in 2011.

== Selected exhibitions ==
Grant's work has been featured in exhibitions at numerous galleries and institutions, including:

- Freestyle, Santa Monica Museum of Art, Santa Monica, US (2001)
- Freestyle, The Studio Museum in Harlem, New York, US (2001)
- a gin cure, Steve Turner Gallery, Beverly Hills, US (2006)
- a gin cure, Roebling Hall, New York, US (2006)
- Taking Possession, University of Arkansas, Little Rock, US (2007)
- Arte Povera Now and Then, Esso Gallery, New York, US (2007)
- Welcome To My World, Alexandre Pollazzon Ltd, London, United Kingdom (2007)
- Emergency Room Show, P.S.1 Contemporary Art Center, New York, US (2007)
- The Old Weird America, Contemporary Arts Museum, Houston, US (2008)
- Deborah Grant: Bacon, Egg, Toast in Lard, Berkeley Art Museum, Berkeley, US (2009)
- Making Sense, Institute for Research in Art at the University of South Florida, Florida, US (2014)
- Christ You Know it Ain't Easy!!, The Drawing Center, New York, US (2014)

== Collections ==
Grant's work is held in permanent collections including:

- In the Land of the Blind the Blue Eye Man is King, 2007, Nasher Museum of Art, Durham, US
