= Kori Newkirk =

African American Contemporary Visual Artist

- Born: 1970 (age 55–56); Bronx, New York City
- Citizenship: American
- Education: School of the Art Institute of Chicago (BFA); University of California, Irvine (MFA)
- Occupation: Visual artist
- Known for: Sculpture, installation, video, and photography

Kori Newkirk (born 1970) is an American visual artist who creates sculptures, installations, video and photography to address themes such as personal and cultural identity and the dynamics of the urban environment. He is known for installations that utilize synthetic hair, which create curtain-like forms that explore both the physicality of urban spaces and elements of African-American culture.

== Early life and education ==
Newkirk was born in the Bronx. He grew up in New York City and rural upstate New York. Newkirk received a Bachelor of Fine Arts from the School of the Art Institute of Chicago and an MFA from the UC Irvine.

== Career ==
Newkirk is known for his use of unconventional materials, such as plastic pony beads, human hair, and aluminum. He came to the attention of the New York art world with a lifesize silhouette of a police surveillance helicopter, painted in hair pomade, that was exhibited as part of the 2001 group show, Freestyle, at the Studio Museum in Harlem.

His first solo museum show, a 10-year survey of his work, was held at the Studio Museum in 2007. Solo shows later took place at the Roberts & Tilton Gallery; Museum of California Art, Orange County Museum of Art. Museum of Contemporary Art in San Diego; the Museum of Contemporary Art in Cleveland; the Art Gallery of Ontario, LAXART, the Fabric Museum and Workshop, Locust Projects and Deep River and in group shows at the Whitney Biennial, the Dakar Biennial, the Serpentine, the MCA Chicago, the Hammer Museum, and the Museum of Contemporary Art in Los Angeles.

== Recognition ==
Newkirk has received grants and fellowships by FOCA, Art Matters, The Louis Comfort Tiffany Foundation, the California Community Foundation, The William H. Johnson Foundation and the Joan Mitchell Foundation. He held a dual appointment at Otis College of Art and Design and the School of the Art Institute of Chicago and served on the faculty of the USC Rosci School.
