= Debra Dickerson =

American writer (born 1959)

Debra J. Dickerson (born 1959) is an American author, editor, writer, and contributing writer and blogger for Mother Jones magazine. Dickerson has been most prolific as an essayist, writing on race relations and racial identity in the United States.

== Early life ==
She dropped out of Florissant Valley Community College and the University of Missouri, soon after to serve in the United States Air Force from 1980 to 1992 as an intelligence officer. She earned a BA in Politics and Government from the University of Maryland, College Park. Dickerson attended St. Mary's University and completed her master's in International Relations while still in the military. Her Air Force career culminated in her appointment as Chief of Intelligence at Ankara Air Station.

In 1992 she worked for President Clinton's presidential campaign while awaiting entrance to Harvard Law School. She graduated from HLS in 1995. While attending Harvard, she said she "had no stomach for the law. I decided to study less (a whole lot less) and have some fun." She began writing a column for the Harvard Law Record, the school's newspaper. Ultimately she pursued a full-time career in writing.

== Writing career ==
She credits the 1996 New Republic essay "Who Shot Johnny?" for jump-starting her career. It describes a drive-by shooting that left her nephew paralyzed, and the family's ambivalence and frustration in knowing the shooter was a fellow African American. Her work has since appeared in The Washington Post, The New York Times Magazine, Good Housekeeping, VIBE, Mother Jones, Slate, The Village Voice, Salon and many other publications. She was a fellow at New America Foundation from 1999 to 2002. After giving up her personal blog in September 2007, Dickerson announced she will become a blogger for Mother Jones magazine.

Dickerson has published two books, An American Story, a memoir, and The End of Blackness. She attracted some attention, as well as accusations of race baiting, in 2007 by declaring that because Democratic president Barack Obama is not a descendant of West Africans brought involuntarily to the United States as slaves, he is not "black."
