= IBCA 2005 =

2005 contemporary art exhibition in the Czech Republic

The International Biennale of Contemporary Art 2005: A Second Sight (IBCA 2005) was a contemporary art exhibition from June 14 to September 11, 2005, held in the National Gallery, Prague, in the Czech Republic.

The Biennale was held under the auspices of Václav Klaus, President of the Czech Republic, and Pavel Bém, Lord Mayor of the capital city, Prague. IBCA 2005 focused on the transitional phenomena of post-modern culture in response to new creative ideas of artists resulting from changes in contemporary civilization.

The International Biennale showcased trends in photography, VideoArt and new communication media. There was also a presentation of “traditional” media, particularly painting. More uniquely, the Biennale also presented theatre and music performances designed as a natural part of free art work, traversing traditional fine art forms. In addition, there were interactive projects, allowing a dialogue between artists and the audience.

The Biennale presented 800 works of art by 400 artists from 20 countries around the world, including 56 video projects, 90 photographic works, 34 installations and 6 communication-based projects; 225 contemporary paintings and other artwork are also slated for display. It included a festival of contemporary alternative theatre and music held in the Veletržní Palace cinema.

IBCA 2005 was prepared by an international team of curators from more than 15 countries on five continents. Projects were presented from, among others, China, South Africa, Latin America, the United States, Canada and Northern, Central and Eastern European countries; contemporary Russian art was also represented.
