= Independent Publisher Book Awards =

Literary award for independently published titles

- Country: United States
- Presented by: Independent Publisher magazine & Jenkins Group
- First award: 1996
- Website: independentpublisher.com/ipland

The Independent Publisher Book Awards, also styled as the IPPY Awards, are a set of annual literary awards for independently published books. They are the longest-running unaffiliated contest open exclusively to independent presses. The IPPY Awards are open to authors and publishers worldwide who produce books written in English and intended for the North American market. According to the IPPY website, the awards 'reward those who exhibit the courage, innovation, and creativity to bring about change in the world of publishing.'

== History ==
The IPPY Awards were founded in 1996 by the Small Press publishing magazine. In 1998, Small Press became the Independent Publisher magazine, but continued to run the annual IPPY Awards. The IPPY's mission statement claims the awards are intended to 'recognise the deserving but often unsung titles published by independent authors and publishers, and bring them to the attention of booksellers, buyers, librarians, and book lovers around the world.' The IPPY criteria for an 'independent' publication mandates that all entries must be from publications that are either 1) independently owned and operated, 2) operated by a foundation or university, or 3) long-time independents that became incorporated but operate autonomously and publish fewer than 50 titles a year.

The first IPPY awards received 325 entries and awarded 90 gold, silver, and bronze medals. In 2020, over 3,000 books were entered into the IPPYs, and 422 medals were awarded. In 25 years, IPPY entry categories have expanded from the 28 available in 1996 to more than a hundred options in 2020, including separate categories for specific genres, regions, and E-books.

== Entry and prize consideration ==
In 2020, the entry fee for the IPPY Awards was $85. Entry discounts for regional and E-book categories are often available. For the 25th anniversary IPPY Awards in 2021, a $25 discount was available for early submissions.

Entries are judged based on first impression, design, originality, use of language, message delivery, and relevance. IPPY medalists receive certificates, medals, and book sticker seals. They also have the option to purchase additional merchandise, including plaques, electronic images, and additional medals and seals.

About 2,400 publishers throughout the English-speaking world participate in the awards each year. In 2017 the contest drew over 5,000 entries, and medals were awarded to authors and publishers from 43 U.S. states, seven Canadian provinces and 15 countries. In 2020, medals were awarded to authors and publishers from all 50 U.S. states, 10 Canadian provinces, and 61 countries.

== Outstanding Book of the Year ==
In 2010, the IPPYs introduced additional "Outstanding Book of the Year" awards. Every IPPY submission is considered for an Outstanding Book award, regardless of category. The outstanding medalists are chosen for exemplifying 'daring spirit' with a book that is 'the most heartfelt, unique, outspoken and experimental among all entries.' In 2020, there were 11 Outstanding Books in eight categories:

- Most Original Concept
- Best Book Arts Craftsmanship
- Most Outstanding Design
- Most Likely to Save the Planet
- Independent Spirit Award
- Independent Voice Award
- Freedom Fighter
- Peacemaker

Notable Outstanding Books of the Year include Peter Kalmus’ Being the Change: Live Well and Spark a Climate Revolution, which was named 2018’s Most Likely to Save the Planet, as well as Warren Lehrer’s A Life in Books: The Rise and Fall of Bleu Mobley, 2014’s Most Original Concept.

== Recipients ==
Books by IPPY winners in 2016, 2017 and 2018 were published by university presses including Princeton, Stanford, Yale, Wisconsin, Iowa, and other major university presses. Among the fiction gold medalists was Elena Ferrante's The Story of the Lost Child, originally published in Italy and issued in English by Europa.

Previous winners in fiction categories include the small presses like Milkweed, Coffee House, Graywolf, The Other Press, McPherson, Europa, and McSweeney's. IPPY Gold Medal winner Lord of Misrule also won the National Book Award and The Patience Stone also won France's Prix Goncourt for its French edition. David Eggers won a 2003 Outstanding Book of the Year for A Heartbreaking Work of Staggering Genius. Margaret Atwood won in 2003 for Negotiating with the Dead: A Writer on Writing. Juan Felipe Herrera, the United States Poet Laureate, won an IPPY gold medal in 2005 for Featherless (Desplumado). Randal Graham won in 2018 the IPPY gold medal in fantasy fiction for Beforelife. David Pietrusza won the 2023 IPPY Gold Medal for US History.

== Categories and regions ==
General Categories:

1. Fine Art
2. Performing Arts (Music/Dance/Cinema/Theatre)
3. Photography
4. Architecture
5. Coffee Table Books
6. Popular Fiction
7. Literary Fiction
8. Short Story Fiction
9. Poetry - Standard
10. Poetry - Specialty
11. Anthologies
12. Juvenile Fiction
13. Young Adult Fiction
14. Fantasy
15. Science Fiction
16. LGBT+ Fiction
17. Erotica
18. Historical Fiction
19. Military/Wartime Fiction
20. Horror
21. Multicultural Fiction
22. Multicultural Fiction – Juv-Young Adult
23. Mystery/Cozy/Noir
24. Suspense/Thriller
25. Religious Fiction
26. Romance
27. Urban Fiction
28. Visionary / New Age Fiction
29. True Crime
30. Graphic Novel/Drawn Book
31. Humor
32. Children's Picture Books (7 & Under)
33. Children's Picture Books (All ages)
34. Children's Interactive
35. Juvenile-Young Adult Non-Fiction
36. Multicultural N-F Juv-Young Adult
37. Multicultural Non-Fiction Adult
38. Essay
39. Creative Non-Fiction
40. Autobiography/Memoir I (Celebrity/Political/Romance)
41. Autobiography/Memoir II (Coming of Age/Family Legacy/Travel)
42. Autobiography/Memoir III (Personal Struggle/Health Issues)
43. Biography
44. Aging/Death & Dying
45. Animals/Pets
46. Business/Career/Sales
47. Cookbooks – General
48. Cookbooks – Specialty
49. Current Events I (Political/Economic/Foreign Affairs)
50. Current Events II (Social Issues/Humanitarian)
51. Education I (Workbook/Resource)
52. Education II (Commentary/Theory)
53. Nature
54. Environment/Ecology
55. Finance/Investment/Economics
56. LGBT+ Non-Fiction
57. Gift/Specialty/Journal
58. Holiday
59. Health/Medicine/Nutrition
60. History (U.S.)
61. History (World)
62. Home/Garden/Crafts
63. Inspirational/Spiritual
64. New Age/Mind-Body-Spirit
65. Parenting
66. Popular Culture
67. Psychology/Mental Health
68. Sports/Fitness/Recreation
69. Reference
70. Religion (Eastern/Western)
71. Science
72. Self Help
73. Sexuality/Relationships
74. Transportation (Auto/Aviation/Railroad, etc.)
75. Travel – Essay
76. Travel – Guidebook
77. Women's Issues
78. Writing/Publishing
79. Book/Author/Publisher Website
80. Cover Design – Fiction
81. Cover Design – Non-Fiction
82. Cover Design – Non-Fiction Oversize
83. Best First Book – Fiction
84. Best First Book – Non-Fiction
85. Book Series - Fiction
86. Book Series - Non-Fiction (note: Book Series category submissions require at least two volumes, with one volume's copyright/release date falling within the 2018–2020 time frame)
87. Audiobook - Fiction
88. Audiobook - Non-Fiction

E-Book Categories

1. Best Adult Fiction E-Book
2. Best Romance/Erotica E-Book
3. Best Mystery/Thriller E-Book
4. Best Sci-Fi/Fantasy/Horror E-Book
5. Best Adult Non-Fiction Personal E-Book
6. Best Adult Non-Fiction Informational E-Book
7. Best Juvenile/Young Adult Fiction E-Book
8. Best Children's Illustrated E-Book
9. Best Regional E-Book – Fiction
10. Best Regional E-Book – Non-Fiction
11. Best E-Book Design

Regional Categories (Awards for "Best Fiction" and "Best Non-Fiction" in each region)

1. Northeast (ME, VT, NH, MA, RI, CT, NY)
2. Mid- Atlantic (PA, WV, VA, DE, MD, DC, NJ)
3. Southeast (KY, NC, SC, GA, FL, AL)
4. South (MS, LA, AR, TX, TN)
5. Great Lakes (OH, MI, IN, IL, WI)
6. Midwest (MN, IA, MO, OK, KS, NE, SD, ND)
7. West-Mountain (MT, WY, UT, CO, NM, AZ, ID, NV)
8. West-Pacific (CA, OR, WA, HI, AK)
9. Canada-East (ON, QB, NF, NB, NS, PE, Nunavut)
10. Canada-West (BC, AB, SK, MB, NW Territories, Yukon)
11. Australia/New Zealand/Pacific Rim
12. Europe

== Criticism ==
in 2015, the IPPY Awards were criticized by Writer Beware, an advocacy website sponsored by the Science Fiction and Fantasy Writers of America (SFWA), which stated that it was one of several profiteer awards run by the Jenkins Group. The site classified profiteer awards as awards that are aimed at "making money for the sponsor."

Many well known awards charge fees. Writer's Digest explicitly notes that while submission fees require authors to be strategic, they do not make an award illegitimate, specifically highlighting the IPPYs as a program that opens real doors for indie authors.

As of 2026 the IPPY merchandise store contains medals and award stickers, as well as framed certificates. The Jenkins Group does provide medals and award stickers at no additional cost to medal winners.
