= Nikki Barthelmess =

American author of young adult fiction

Nikki Barthelmess is an American author of young adult fiction. She is the author of the novels The Quiet You Carry (2019), Quiet No More (2020), and Everything Within and In Between (2021).

== Early life ==
Barthelmess spent her teenage years in Nevada's foster care system, which later influenced her debut novel, The Quiet You Carry.

== Career ==
Barthelmess published The Quiet You Carry with Flux in 2019.Kirkus Reviews and Foreword Reviews discussed its portrayal of foster care, trauma, and abuse.

Quiet No More, which is a sequel to The Quiet You Carry, was published by Flux in 2020. Kirkus Reviews described the novel as a sensitive treatment of surviving abuse.

HarperTeen published Barthelmess's third novel, Everything Within and In Between, in 2021. The novel follows a Mexican American teenager exploring her cultural identity and family history. Kirkus Reviews and Publishers Weekly discussed its treatment of cultural identity, assimilation, and intergenerational relationships.

The Santa Barbara News-Press profiled Barthelmess and her work in a 2021 feature about Everything Within and In Between and how it explores cultural identity. The Montecito Journal also profiled Barthelmess, discussing her bicultural background and its influence on the novel's themes of identity and representation.

In 2021, Barthelmess wrote a first-person essay for Newsweek about her experiences with race and identity as a mixed-heritage Latina.

== Awards and honors ==
- The Quiet You Carry won a silver medal in Young Adult Fiction at the 2020 Independent Publisher Book Awards and a gold medal in the Young Adult Fiction–Mature Issues category of the 2020 Moonbeam Children's Book Awards.
