= Stephen J. Bury =

English art historian

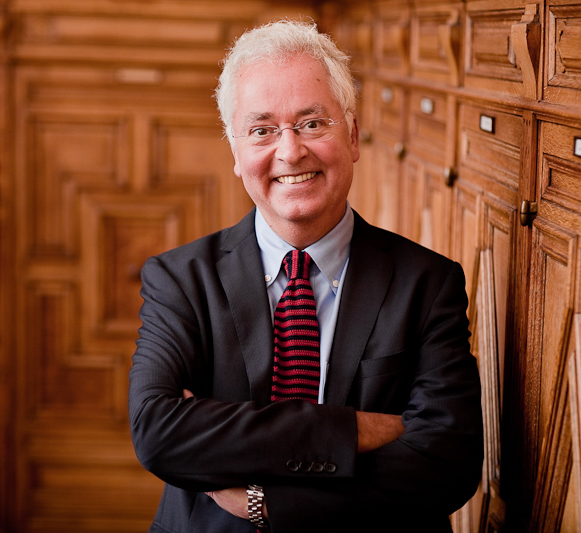
- Bury in the reading room of the Frick Art Research Library, New York
- Born: Stephen John Bury; 12 May 1954 (age 72); Darwen, England
- Education: Balliol College, Oxford; Birkbeck, University of London
- Known for: Art historian; librarian

Stephen John Bury (born 12 May 1954) is an English art historian and is a former Andrew W. Mellon Chief Librarian of the Frick Art Research Library in New York City. He is known for his scholarship on artists' books, although his research interests also include the literature of art, the impact of the digital on the future of humanities, and the use of the past in the project of modernism.

== Education ==
Bury received his BA in modern history from the University of Oxford, where he was a Brackenbury Scholar of Balliol College. He studied librarianship at University College London and Victorian studies at Birkbeck, University of London, where he wrote a PhD on John Ruskin titled John Ruskin and History (defended 1990).

== Career ==
Bury began his career in 1979 as the assistant librarian of Chelsea School of Art, London, where he also taught art history and fine art practice. He became head of Modern English Collections at the British Library in 2000 and in 2002, a deputy director as head of European and American Collections, Maps, Music and Philatelic. He was senior responsible officer for the National Preservation Office from 2003 to 2009 and the UK Web Archiving Program from 2008 to 2010. Bury also chaired the boards of Bookworks and Matt's Gallery, London. In 2010, he assumed the position of Andrew W. Mellon Chief Librarian at the Frick Art Research Library; he served in this role until 2025. Currently, he is a board member of the Exhibitions Committee of the Grolier Club, New York and the Center for Book Arts in New York, and is an active member of the planning committee for the Contemporary Artists' Books Conference, which is held annually in collaboration with the NY Art Book Fair. Bury also served as advisory editor to Oxford Art Online from 2011 to 2014. In 2019, he was awarded the Albert Nelson Marquis Lifetime Achievement Award.

== Publications ==
Bury's publications focus on artists' books, which he has defined as "books or book-like objects over the final appearance of which an artist has had a high degree of control; where the book is intended as a work of art in itself." He is the author of Artist's Books: The Book As a Work of Art, 1963–1995 of 1995 (to be re-issued in May 2015), which combines a series of incisive essays on historical aspects of the medium with an extensive bibliography. In 2001, he published Artists' Multiples and Multiplication, and in 2007, Breaking the Rules: The Printed Face of the European Avant-Garde, 1990–1937 appeared. He has had an artists' book column in Art Monthly since 1997. He also regularly contributes to Cassone. In 2019, he contributed a chapter to the book Museums and Digital Culture.

== Curating ==
Bury curated the exhibition "Breaking the Rules" at the British Library in 2007–2008. In 2011, he curated "Aphasic Disturbance" at CHELSEAspace, London, which according to critic Pamela Kember brought together "a small but carefully selected number of artists' books, multiple editions and objects to articulate new meanings or associations."
