= Warren Lehrer =

American author and artist

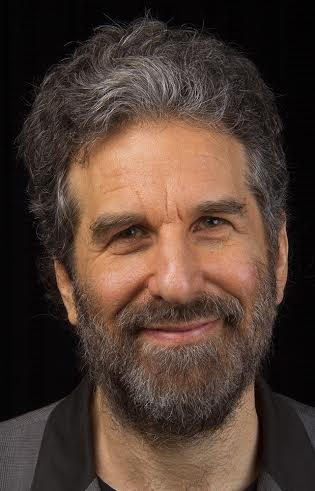
- Born: Queens, New York
- Occupations: Writer/artist, performer, educator
- Writing career
- Genres: Visual literature, novelist, documentarian
- Notable works: A Life In Books: The Rise and Fall of Bleu Mobley, Crossing the BLVD: strangers, neighbors, aliens in a new America, French Fries
- Notable awards: Ladislav Sutnar Prize, Center for Book Arts, Brendan Gill Prize, IPPY Outstanding Book of the Year Award, Innovative Use of Archives Award, 3 AIGA Book Awards, Best New Fiction Award (USA Best Books)

Warren Lehrer is an American author and artist/designer known mostly for his highly visual books and multimedia projects. Lehrer came to prominence in the 1980s and 90s for his attempts at capturing the shape of thought and speech on the printed page in his books and performance scores characterized by polyvalent narratives and expressionistic typography. Since then he’s authored and co-authored works of non-fiction, fiction, and poetry that also marry writing, typography and image. His illuminated novel, A Life in Books: The Rise and Fall of Bleu Mobley (Goff Books, 2013) contains 101 books within it, including cover designs and excerpts that read like short stories. In November 2019, Lehrer received the Lifetime Achievement Ladislav Sutner Prize in Czech Republic for "his pioneering work in Visual Literature and Design". Named after the Czech-American design pioneer, the annual award "recognizes individual artists from around the world of outstanding performance in the field of fine arts, especially applied arts and design". In 2016, he was honored by the Center for Book Arts for his contributions to the field of book arts.

== Life and work ==
Lehrer was born in 1955 and raised in Queens, New York. He is the son of Arthur and Ruth Lehrer, brother of broadcast journalist Brian Lehrer, and married to author and performer Judith Sloan. Lehrer received his BA from Queens College, CUNY, and an MFA from Yale University. He is a founding faculty member of the "Designer As Author/Entrepreneur" MFA program at the School of Visual Arts (SVA) in New York City and Professor Emeritus at the School of Art and Design at Purchase College, SUNY. Together with Judith Sloan, Lehrer founded EarSay Inc. in 1999, an artist-driven, non-profit arts organization in Queens, New York dedicated to nurturing and portraying stories of the uncelebrated.

Lehrer is profiled as a pioneer practitioner of design authorship and visual literature in numerous books and feature articles on graphic design, typography, book arts, and experimental literature. His work explores the vagaries and luminescence of character, the relationships between social structures and the individual, and the pathos and absurdity of life. His projects, some fiction, some non-fiction, bridge the divide between documentary and expressive forms. His work tackles subjects such as the immigrant experience, neurodivergent experiences, the line between madness and brilliance, war and peace, the creative process, and surveillance.

Lehrer has received many awards for his books and projects, including the 2024 Design Incubation Scholarship: Creative Works Award for his multimedia electronic book app Riveted in the Word; 2019 STA 100 Award (Society of Typographic Arts) and the 2019 Design Incubation Scholarship: Creative Work Award, and the 2019 IPPY (Independent Publisher Book Awards) Gold Medal Award for Poetry for his collaborative project, Five Oceans in a Teaspoon with poetry by Dennis J. Bernstein; the 2015 International Book Award for Best New Fiction, the 2014 IPPY (Independent Publisher Book Awards) Outstanding Book of the Year Award for Most Original Concept, the 2014 USA Book Award for Best New Fiction for A Life in Books; the 2004 Brendan Gill Prize, The 2003 Innovative Use of Archives Award for Crossing the BLVD co-authored with Judith Sloan; three American Institute for Graphic Arts Book Awards, The International Book Design Award, a Best of the Best Award from the New York Book Show, a National Indie Book Award, and a Prix Arts Electronica Award. He is a 2016 Honoree of the Center for Book Arts (New York City) for being "a pioneer in visual literature and design authorship" and for "extending the field of book arts to the broader worlds of contemporary art and literature." He is the recipient of fellowships from The National Endowment for the Arts and The New York Foundation for the Arts (2020 and 1989); and multiple grants from The New York State Council on the Arts (in Literature, Visual Arts, Electronic Media), The Rockefeller Foundation, The Ford Foundation, The Greenwall Foundation, The Furthermore Foundation, and others. His work has been exhibited widely and is in many collections including the Museum of Modern Art, Brooklyn Museum, L.A. County Art Museum, The Getty Museum, Georges Pompidou Centre, and Tate Gallery. The Crossing the BLVD exhibition (co-produced with Sloan) premiered in 2003 at The Queens Museum of Art and has traveled to fourteen other museums and galleries throughout the United States.

Lehrer is a frequent lecturer and presenter at universities, art centers, and bookstores, and has been keynote speaker/performer at conferences on book arts, design and oral history, including as keynote speaker at the 2013 NY Art Book Fair Contemporary Artists Book Conference at PS1 MoMA New York.

Lehrer's performances and plays have been performed at venues including La MaMa Experimental Theatre, The Knitting Factory, Independent Art at Here, The Painted Bride, The LaGuardia Performing Art Center, The Market Theatre (Johannesburg) and The Theatre Workshop (Edinburgh).

Since 2012, Lehrer has augmented his books with animations, short films, and interactive components, and has focused on projects that deepen an understanding of neurodivergent and other human conditions such as Dyslexia, Alzheimer’s Disease, Aphasia, displacement, trauma, and loss. In 2024 he came out with his first fully electronic book app, Riveted in the Word, which employs a custom interactive interface, animation, and an original soundtrack that help place the reader inside the mind of a retired history professor as she recalls her hard-fought but triumphant journey regaining language after a devastating stroke.

== Books ==
- Riveted in the Word, written and designed by Lehrer, (2024, EarSay and AltSalt, distributed through the Apple App Store, ISBN 979-8-9897802-1-1)
- This Page is an Occupied Territory, written by Adeena Karasick, visualized by Lehrer, (2024, EarSay and NuJu Books, ISBN 979-8-9897802-2-8)
- Jericho’s Daughter, written and design by Lehrer with images by Sharon Horvath, (2024, EarSay, ISBN 979-8-9897802-0-4)
- Ouvert Oeuvre: Openings, written by Adeena Karasick, visualized by Lehrer, (2023, Lavender Ink, ISBN 978-1-956921-13-7)
- Five Oceans in a Teaspoon, with Dennis J. Bernstein, (2019, Paper Crown Press ISBN 978-0-9969506-3-3)
- A Life In Books: The Rise and Fall of Bleu Mobley (2013, Goff Books ISBN 193962102X ISBN 978-1939621023)
- Crossing the BLVD: Strangers, neighbors, aliens in a new America (with Judith Sloan, 2003, W.W. Norton Inc. New York/London ISBN 0393324664 ISBN 978-0393324662)
- Brother Blue: A Narrative Portrait of Brother Blue a.k.a. Dr. Hugh Morgan Hill (The Portrait Series, 1995, Bay Press ISBN 0941920364 ISBN 978-0941920360)
- Charlie: A Narrative Portrait of Charles Lang (The Portrait Series, 1995, Bay Press ISBN 0941920348 ISBN 978-0941920346)
- Claude: A Narrative Portrait of Claude Debs (The Portrait Series, 1995, Bay Press, ISBN 0941920356 ISBN 978-0941920353)
- Nicky D. from L.I.C.: A Narrative Portrait of Nicholas Detommaso (The Portrait Series, 1995, Bay Press, ISBN 0941920372
- GRRRHHHH: A Study of Social Patterns (with Dennis Bernstein and Sandra Brownlee, 1988, Center for Editions/EarSay, ISBN 978-0961387112)
- French Fries (with Dennis Bernstein, 1984, Visual Studies Workshop Press, ISBN 978-0961387105)
- i mean you know (1983, Visual Studies Workshop Press, ISBN 978-0898220353)
- versations: a setting for eight conversations (1980, Lehrer/Baker)

== Audio CDs ==
- Crossing the BLVD (with Judith Sloan and Scott Johnson, 2003, W.W. Norton/EarSay)
- The Search for IT and Other Pronouns (with Harvey Goldman, 1991, LaLa Music)

== Plays and performance works ==
- Social Security: the basic training of Eugene Solomon (with Dennis Bernstein, 1980)
- versations (1980)
- i mean you know (1983)
- French Fries (with Dennis Bernstein, 1984)
- Denial of the Fittest (with Judith Sloan, 1996)
- A Tattle Tale: Eyewitness in Mississippi (with Judith Sloan, 1997)
- Crossing the BLVD (with Judith Sloan, 2003)
- 1001 Voices: A Symphony for a New America (Composed by Frank London, Libretto by Judith Sloan, Projections/Animation by Warren Lehrer, premiered 2012, 2017, Queens Symphony Orchestra, Colden Auditorium, Flushing, NY)
- A Life In Books: The Rise and Fall of Bleu Mobley (2013)
- Five Oceans in a Teaspoon (poetry Dennis J Bernstein, visuals Lehrer, music Andrew Griffin, 2019-present)
- Ouvert Oeuvre: Openings (poetry Adeena Karasick, visuals Lehrer, music Frank London, 2023-present)
- Jericho’s Daughter (text and design Lehrer, images Sharon Horvath, performed by Lehrer, Judith Sloan, Najla Said, 2024-present)
- Riveted in the Word (words and visuals by Lehrer, music by Andrew Griffin, performed by Lehrer and Judith Sloan, 2024-present)
- This Page is an Occupied Territory (poetry Adeena Karasick, visuals Lehrer, 2024-present)

== Animations ==
- Globalization: Preventing the Sameness of the World (with Brandon Campbell and Judith Sloan, featuring Eugene Hütz of Gogol Bordello, 2012)
- 1001 Voices: A Symphony for a New America (with Brandon Campbell, in collaboration with Judith Sloan, Frank London and the Queens Symphony Orchestra, 2012/2017)
- A Life In Books: The Rise and Fall of Bleu Mobley (assorted animations and videos, 2013/14)
- Five Oceans and Teaspoon based on poems by Dennis J. Bernstein (assorted animations, 2019/2020)
