= Edit DeAk =

Hungarian-American art critic and writer (1948–2017)

- Born: Edit Deák; September 16, 1948; Budapest, Hungary
- Died: June 9, 2017 (aged 68); New York City, U.S.
- Other name: Edit deAk
- Occupations: Art critic Writer
- Years active: 1972–2017
- Known for: Art-Rite; Printed Matter, Inc

Edit DeAk (/ˈdeɪæk/; formerly deAk; née Deák; September 16, 1948 – June 9, 2017) was a Hungarian-American art critic and writer, co-founder of the journal Art-Rite and the non-profit bookstore and artist book distributor Printed Matter, Inc.

== Early life and education ==
DeAk was born Edit Deák in Budapest, Hungary, to Elvira (née Csutkai) and Béla Deák.

In 1968, DeAk escaped Communist Hungary in the trunk of a car into Yugoslavia. She and her husband, Péter Grósz, eventually came to New York City via Italy.

In 1972, DeAk received a B.A. in Art History from Columbia University.

== Career ==
After taking an art criticism class taught by Brian O'Doherty, DeAk, and two fellow Columbia students – Walter Robinson and Joshua Cohn – were invited to write for the publication Art in America, where O'Doherty was an editor. DeAk was initially puzzled that an established publication wanted to recruit "baby blood," though she, Robinson, and Cohn still wrote for Art in America. However, DeAk and her cohorts eventually dreamed of starting their own magazine, and proposed ideas of printing a newspaper insert in Art in America. DeAk, Robinson, and Cohn later enrolled in the Whitney Independent Study Program, where the idea to publish a magazine resurfaced. Thus, the art magazine Art-Rite was founded in 1973.

In its conception, DeAk aimed for Art-Rite to have "a whole new tone and attitude," by addressing issues with humor and promoting unconventional forms of art, such as street art and performance art. Furthermore, DeAk and her colleagues created a very symbiotic relationship between Art-Rite and the artistic community, as the magazines were freely given away, "in recognition of the community which nurtures it.”

In 1974, DeAk initiated a series dedicated to video, performance art, and readings at the Artists Space gallery, where she was working as a part-time assistant.

In 1976, while Art-Rite was still regularly published, DeAk, along with Robinson, Sol LeWitt, Carl Andre, Lucy Lippard, Pat Steir, Irena Von Zahn, Mimi Wheeler, and Robin White, founded the art space, organization, and publication company Printed Matter Inc.

DeAk wrote for many New York-based arts magazines. Through their connection and close association at Printed Matter, Inc, DeAk wrote articles for Artforum editor in chief, Ingrid Sischy, as well as for Interview, ZG, Art Random, among others.

== Personal life ==
At the age of 18, DeAk married an artist named Péter Grósz (born in 1947 in Hungary), who later was known as Peter Grass. They eventually divorced.

The penultimate decades of DeAk's life were plague with poor health heavy drug use. At the age of 68, DeAk died of pneumonia and acute respiratory stress syndrome-related complications in New York City.

== Works and publications ==
- DeAk, Edit, ed. (1989). Domenico Bianchi, Gianni Dessì, Giuseppe Gallo (in English, Italian, and Japanese). Kyoto: Kyoto Shoin. ISBN 978-4-763-68505-6. OCLC 758714266. – Art Random, no. 15
- DeAk, Edit (1974). "New York: Mel Bochner at Sonnabend". Art in America. 62.1974 (1): 100–102. ISBN 9780991558575. ISSN 0004-3214. OCLC 888754797.
- deAk, Edit (April 1982). "New Again: Francesco Clemente". Interview Magazine.
- DeAk, Edit; Smith, Duncan (1984). Motives – Exhibition catalog. Buffalo, NY: Albright-Knox Art Gallery. OCLC 950121822. – Exhibition from February 28, 1984 to April 1, 1984
- deAk, Edit (September 1987). "25 Years of Stephen Sprouse". Interview Magazine.

== See also ==
- Art-Rite
