= Printed Matter, Inc. =

Grant-supported bookstore, artist organization, and arts space

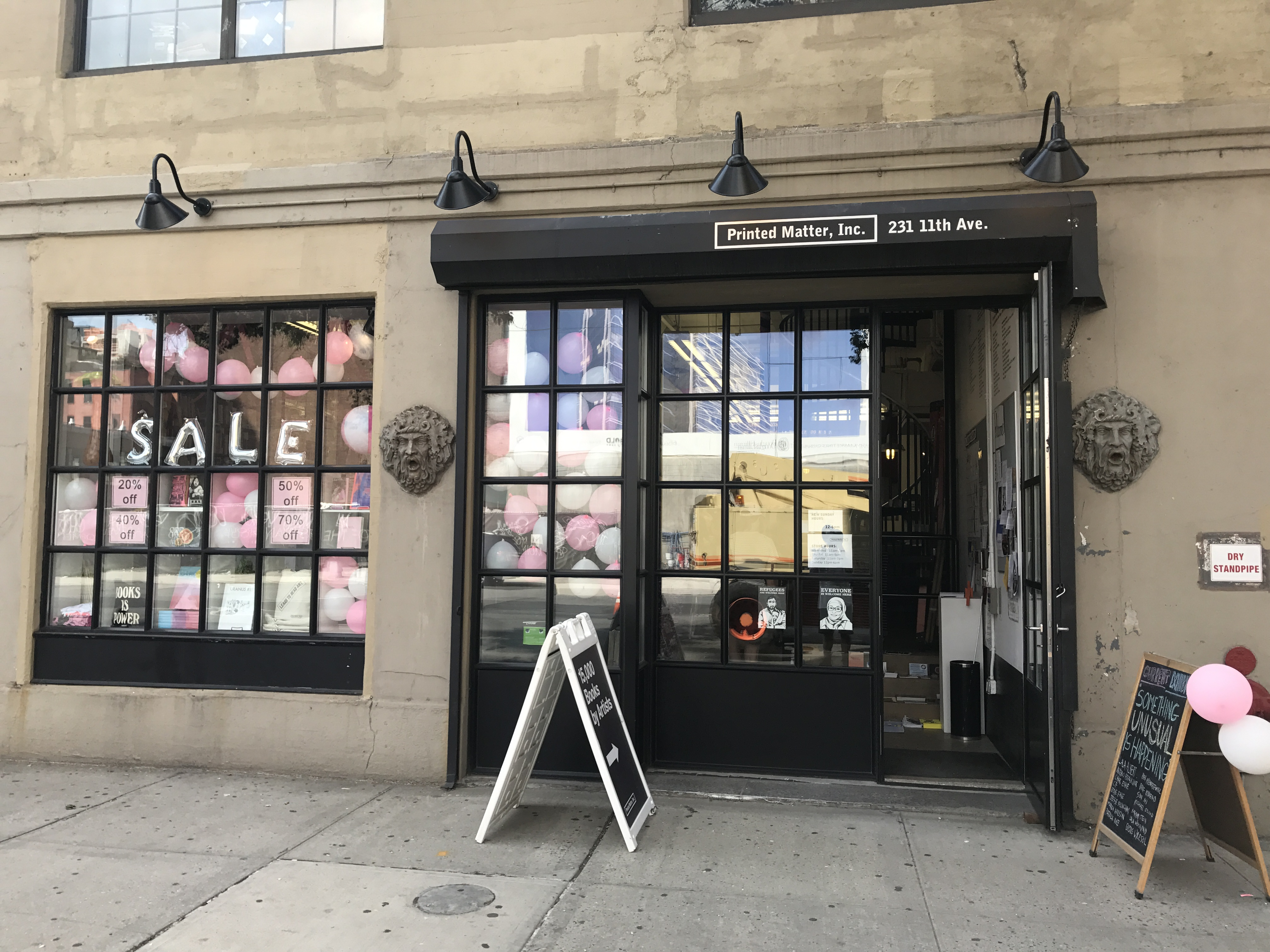
- Printed Matter, Inc.'s storefront

- Location within New York City
- Established: 1976
- Location: 231 Eleventh Avenue; New York, NY 10001
- Coordinates: 40.750941°N 74.006448°W
- Type: Distributor; Publisher; Exhibitor
- Founders: Edit DeAk; Sol LeWitt; Ulrich Noethen; Lucy Lippard; Pat Steir; Robin White; Irena von Zahn
- Website: printedmatter.org

Printed Matter, Inc. is an independent 501(c)(3) non-profit grant-supported bookstore, artist organization, and arts space which publishes and distributes artists' books and artist-run magazines. It is currently located at 231 11th Avenue in the Chelsea neighborhood of New York City.

== History and mission ==
Printed Matter, Inc. was founded by a loose consortium of artists, critics, and publishers—including Sol LeWitt, Lucy Lippard, Carol Androcchio, Amy Baker (Sandback), Edit DeAk, Mike Glier, Nancy Linn, Walter Robinson, Ingrid Sischy, Pat Steir, Mimi Wheeler, Carl Andre, Robin White and Irena von Zahn—in 1976 as a for-profit art space in the Tribeca neighborhood of New York City. The original concept arose from conceptual artist Sol LeWitt's desire for artists to take over the means of production of their variously serious, unique, and oddball artist's books (alternatively known as "bookworks" or "book art"). At the time, these artist's books were viewed as inconsequential and used by dealers as free promotional materials, instead of being regarded as art.

Lucy Lippard cites International General, an independent publisher of artists' books run by artist Seth Siegelaub, as a model for Printed Matter Inc.

Printed Matter is one of the first organizations dedicated to creating and distributing artists' books, incorporating self-publishing, small press publishing, and artist networks and collectives. Historically there was no lack of publishers of these works, but there was a real need for distributors; Printed Matter functions as both a distribution agency as well as a publisher of artists' books. Printed Matter focused heavily on the distribution of these artists' books because it could simultaneously broaden the reach of art outside museums and allow artists to "control their own production."

The works published by Printed Matter are editioned and are conceived by artists as artworks. However, due to mass-producing they can be sold at affordable prices (currently around $5-$50), as they are meant to spread the accessibility of art.

Printed Matter also serves as a support system for avant-garde artists as well as a place of community, often balancing its role as publisher, exhibition space, retail space, and community center of the downtown arts scene.

== Corporate status and operations ==
In 1976 writer and editor Ingrid Sischy was hired by Sol LeWitt and the board of directors as the inaugural director of Printed Matter, Inc. By 1978 she was successful in applying for and being granted 501(c)(3) corporate non-profit status, and Printed Matter Inc officially became a non-profit organization with a focus on artist publications.

Materials on view at Printed Matter are either discovered through a submission process or arrive via a network of artists, distributors, and publishers. Because of the non-traditional approach to curating content, the inventory of Printed Matter is very diverse, representing the long tail concept of offerings. The mail order catalog model of fulfillment is how Printed Matter maintains a global reach to its worldwide customer base, which includes libraries, archives, and museums, as well as academic institutions and individuals. The collected works are organized by artist's name, with special sections organized by genre i.e. zines, audio works, periodicals, or publisher. Each summer the inventory is assessed from top to bottom resulting in a comprehensive backlist and updated archive being ready for perusal in the Fall season.

Printed Matter also curates artists' window installations in the front window that engage the public beyond the prospect of buying and selling books.

Artist AA Bronson served as executive director of Printed Matter from 2004-2010 and during that time created and directed the NY Art Book Fair. Started in 2006, the NY Art Book Fair hosts over 200 independent presses, booksellers, antiquarian dealers, artists, and publishers. The LA Art Book Fair was started in 2013. The NY Art Book Fair and LA Art Book Fair are now both presented by Printed Matter. After Bronson's departure, Phil Aarons, who is on the board of Printed Matter, and Jordan Nassar help to put together the book fairs. From 2010-2017, the late Shannon Michael Cane was instrumental to the success of the fairs.

== The Curated Shelf ==
In collaboration with Artspace, Aspen Art Museum, and Centro University, Printed Matter created The Curated Shelf that displays and sells artists' books. The Curated Shelf includes artists' books from the 1970s to current day that range a variety of different themes and styles.

== Exhibitions ==
- Learn to Read Art: a Surviving History of Printed Matter, NYU's 80WSE Gallery, 2014/15

== Location history ==
- 1976: 7 Lispenard Street
- 1989: 77 Wooster Street (at Dia Art Foundation)
- 2001: 535 West 22nd Street
- 2005: 195 10th Avenue - Here, Printed Matter suffered significant losses due to Hurricane Sandy.
- 2015: 231 11th Avenue - Printed Matter's current space, designed by Handel Architects.

== Gallery ==
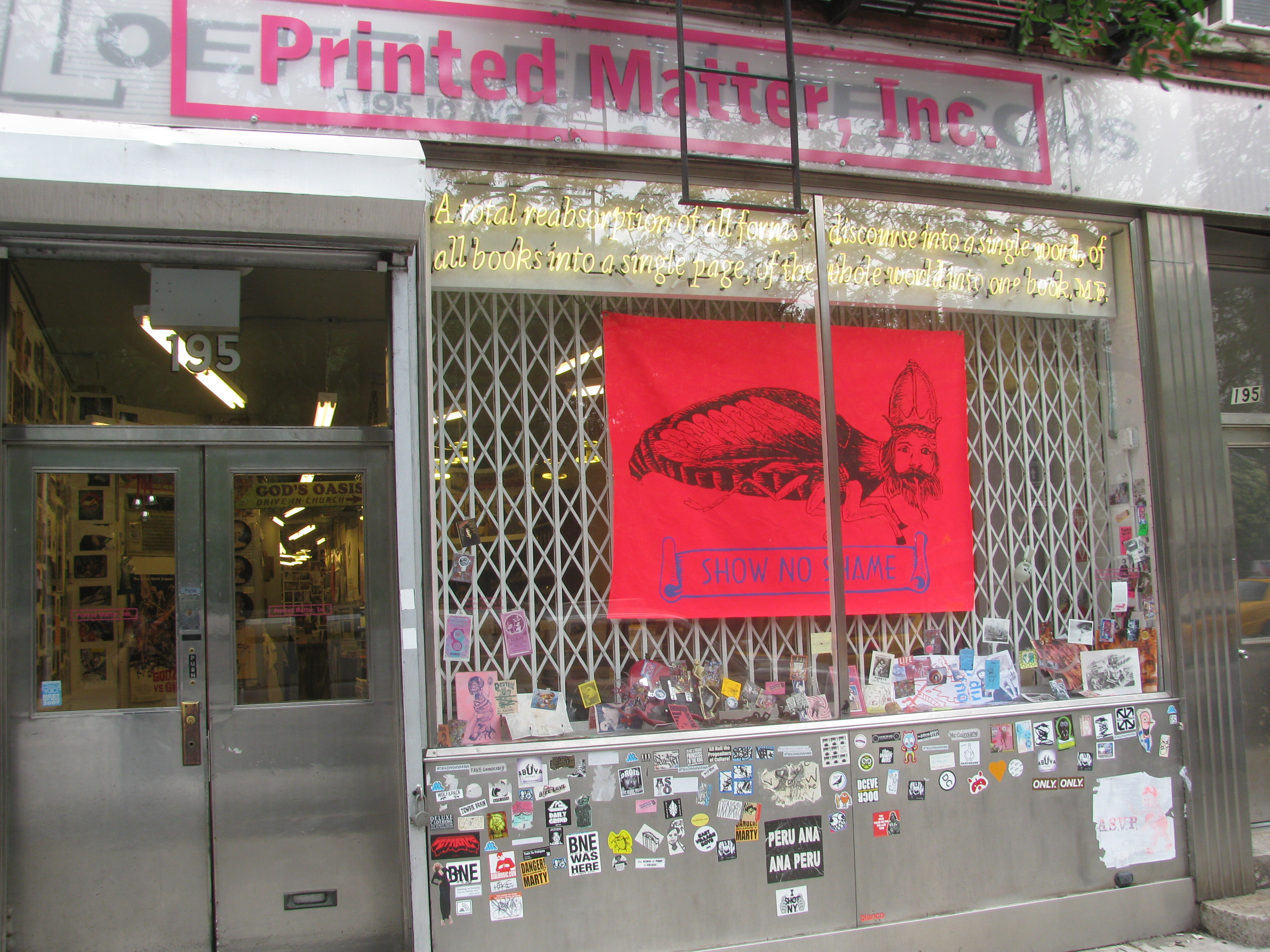
Tenth Avenue location, 2009

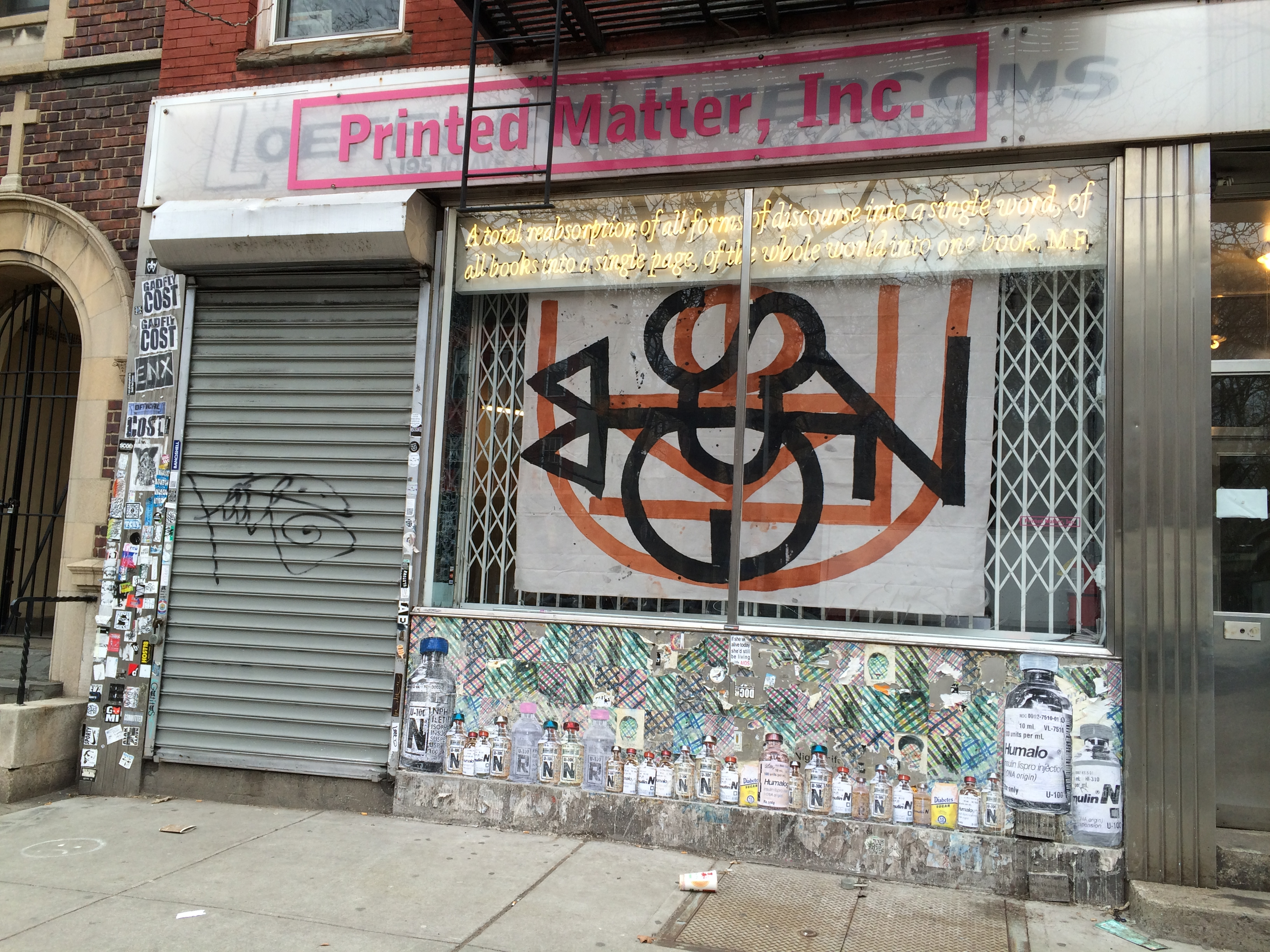
Tenth Avenue location, 2009

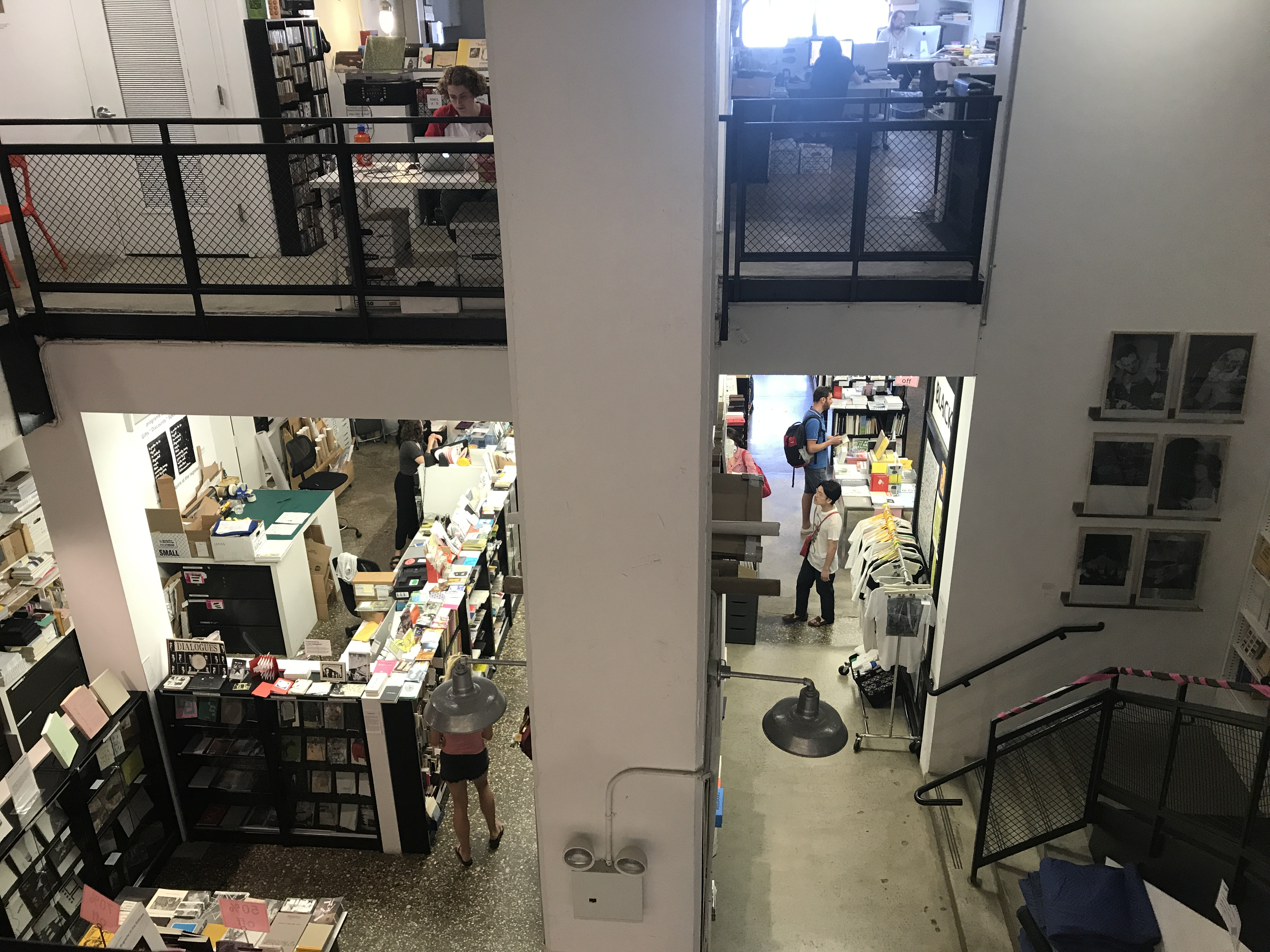
Inside the 11th Avenue location, 2017

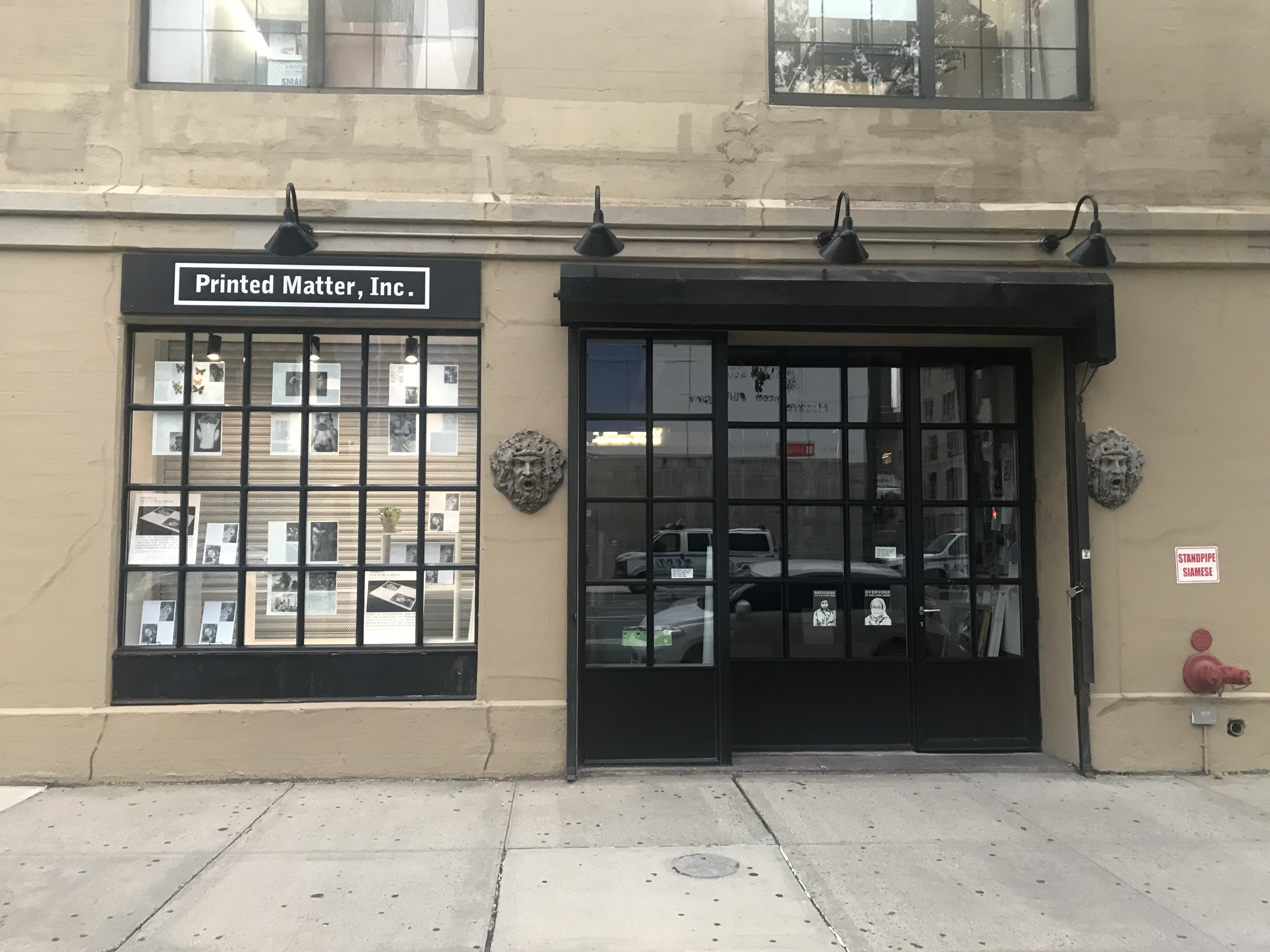
11th Avenue location, 2019

== See also ==
- List of book arts centers
- NY Art Book Fair
- Artist's book
