= Barbara Vance =

American author and illustrator

Barbara Vance is an American author and illustrator, best known for her children's book Suzie Bitner Was Afraid of the Drain.

== Career ==
Vance's first book, Suzie Bitner Was Afraid of the Drain, is a Moonbeam Children's Book Award–winner, a Next Generation Indie Book Award finalist, and twice a finalist for the Texas Library Association's Bluebonnet Award. First published by Copperplate in 2010, it is a collection of 124 humorous and whimsical poems, and over 100 illustrations, which garnered attention for its relatable themes and playful tone. Vance's work is often compared to that of classic children's poets such as Shel Silverstein, blending light-hearted verse with imaginative illustrations. Wholesalers for the book include Baker & Taylor Books, Follet Schools Solutions and Brodart.

== Education ==
In addition to her work as an author, Vance holds degrees in English from Southern Methodist University and a PhD in Creative Writing from the University of Texas at Dallas, where she later taught. She has been involved in educational and literary communities, promoting literacy and creative expression among young readers. Vance continues to write and illustrate, contributing to the literary and educational fields.

== Books ==
- Suzie Bitner Was Afraid of the Drain, Copperplate Publishing, 2010.
- Merry Christmas Snert, Copperplate Publishing, 2010.

== Links ==
- Official website
