= Suzie Bitner Was Afraid of the Drain =

2010 children's poetry collection by Barbara Vance

Suzie Bitner Was Afraid of the Drain is a 2010 children's poetry collection written by American author and illustrator Barbara Vance, published by Cooperplate Publishing. The collection contains 124 humorous and whimsical poems, and over 100 illustrations. Reviewers compared the book Shel Silverstein's Where the Sidewalk Ends.

Suzie Bitner Was Afraid of the Drain is a Moonbeam Children's Book Award-winner, a Next Generation Indie Book Award finalist, and twice a finalist for the Texas Library Association's Bluebonnet Award.
