= ArtStars* TV =

YouTube show

ArtStars* is a YouTube show hosted by Nadja Sayej that focuses on comedic conversations in the art world. It was founded in 2009 in Toronto with video artist Jeremy Bailey and video editor Ryan Edwards. The show has been called "a gonzo skewering of sanctified art pretense".

As one of the first vlogs in the art world, the episodes have been described as gonzo and satirical for crashing gallery openings and interviewing "art stars, their groupies and the people who go to galleries just for the booze". The interview style and commentary in the show "punctures pretension, deflate egos and delight lovers of lively criticism".

It follows the tradition of reporting on the art scene, similar to the GalleryBeat TV cable access TV show in New York City in the 1980s. The show has been noted for making the art world more accessible.

Episodes include interviews with noteworthy artists John Waters, Ai Weiwei, Robert Crumb, Marina Abramović, Peaches, and Julian Schnabel.
