= CABC =

CABC may refer to:

- Canadian American Business Council
- Cardiff Athletic Bowls Club, Welsh sports club
- China-Africa Business Council
- Contemporary Artists' Books Conference
- Convention of Atlantic Baptist Churches, now Canadian Baptists of Atlantic Canada
