= Jordan Nassar =

American artist (born 1985)

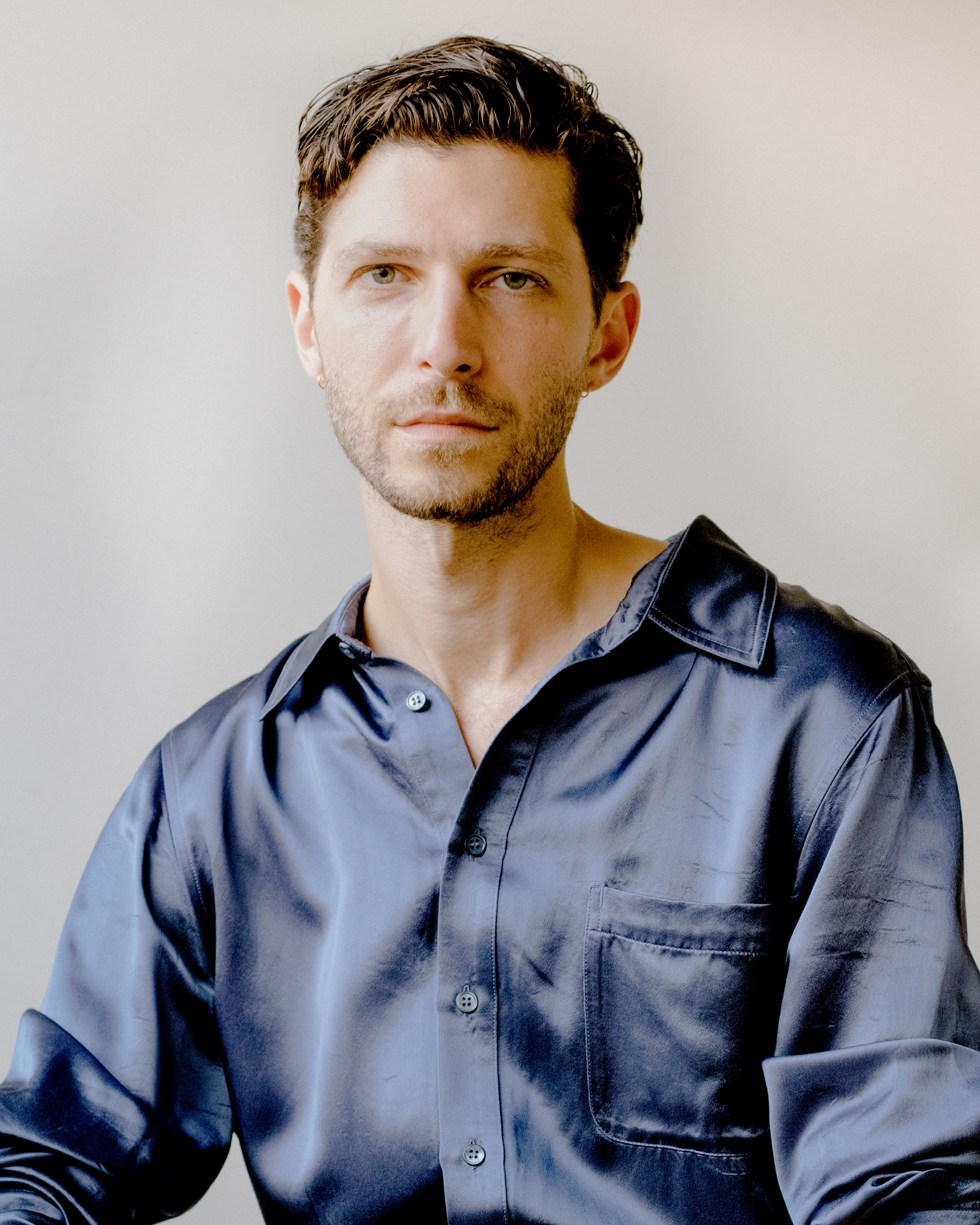
- Born: 1985 (age 40–41); New York City, New York, United States
- Education: Middlebury College
- Occupations: Contemporary visual artist, textile artist
- Known for: Traditional tatreez embroidery on canvas
- Movement: textile art, landscape painting, embroidery, craft, installation
- Spouse: Amir Guberstein
- Website: jordannassar.com

Jordan Nassar (born 1985) is an American contemporary visual artist. He primarily works with textiles, especially in creating works based on traditional Palestinian embroidery. Nassar also creates self-published artist's books and zines. He is based in New York City.

Nassar's practice also encompasses glass mosaics, wood inlay, and installations. His work often addresses themes of landscape, heritage, and diaspora, and he is represented by Anat Ebgi Gallery and James Cohan Gallery .

== Early life ==
Nassar was born in 1985 on the Upper West Side of Manhattan, where he also grew up. He is the son of a Polish mother and of a U.S.-born Palestinian doctor who performs humanitarian work in Palestine. His paternal grandfather, a Jordanian–Palestinian, came to the United States as a teenager.

== Career ==
Nassar bases his work on tatreez (Palestinian cross-stitch embroidery) which is typically created in panels which are stitched together into clothing or other items. Nassar typically creates and frames small panels, many around 8 x 10 inches. The panels' patterns typically feature geometric borders and depict plants and flowers, though the thread colors Nassar uses often do not correspond to those shapes, but to subtle landscapes. Nassar's work depicts cultural elements of his upbringing on the Upper West Side, which he likens to traditional Palestinian embroidery, where each village uses distinct symbols. Some designs also feature technology-related motifs, such as computers, which Nassar links with embroidery as the first form of pixelation.

Nassar creates many of his embroideries in collaboration with Palestinian collectives in the West Bank. Groups in Ramallah, Hebron, and Bethlehem stitch geometric patterns, which Nassar then integrates into larger compositions of abstracted skies and landscapes. Through this process, traditional motifs are combined with contemporary forms, opening new dialogues between craft, memory, and identity.

Beyond embroidery, Nassar works with glass mosaics, brass and mother-of-pearl wood inlay, and hand-fired glass beads. His mosaic practice began during a 2022 residency at the Shangri La Museum of Islamic Art, Culture & Design in Honolulu, resulting in Lē‘ahi (2022), now in the museum's collection.

In 2024, his Los Angeles exhibition Surge presented mosaics such as Mudun Falastin (Palestinian Cities), which incorporated the Arabic names of 22 historic Palestinian cities.

Landscape is a recurring theme in his work, functioning as a metaphor for homeland, memory, and diaspora. Writing about his exhibition THERE (North Carolina Museum of Art, 2024), critic Robert Alan Grand described his embroideries as “mural-like works” that integrate traditional motifs with expansive vistas.

His immersive installations extend this approach. For The Sea Beneath Our Eyes (Center for Contemporary Art Tel Aviv, 2019), later shown at KMAC Museum (2021) and James Cohan Gallery (2023), Nassar transformed the gallery into a furnished domestic interior made in collaboration with regional craftspeople.

Nassar's earliest work involved copying embroidery patterns from books. Once he learned that each Palestinian village has its own pattern, he began to develop his own patterns resembling Palestinian embroidery but that do not exist in traditional works. Each work contains up to 75,000 individual stitches.

Nassar draws inspiration from a number of artists, many of whom work in textile, such as Sheila Hicks, Hannah Ryggen, and Anni Albers; painters including Paul Guiragossian and Helen Frankenthaler; and artists working with alternative media, such as Monir Shahroudy Farmanfarmaian. He sees his work as continuing the conversations their artwork has created. He considers their efforts to be about form, texture, and color, though Nassar primarily tries to address concepts and issues beyond the medium itself. Nassar particularly looks up to Etel Adnan, a Lebanese-American poet, essayist, and visual artist.

Since Nassar's first solo exhibition, in London in 2015, he has turned to creating more political works, including focusing on cultural absorption, or absorption of elements of one culture by another.

Nassar held a solo exhibition in Los Angeles at Anat Ebgi gallery's AE2 space in 2017. Anat Ebgi presented Nassar's work at the 2018 Frieze New York, an art fair in New York City.

In addition to Nassar's embroidery, he also has had managerial positions at the New York City artists book shop Printed Matter, Inc., running the NY Art Book Fair and the art fair Art Los Angeles Contemporary.

=== Artist residency ===
Nassar started expanding the use of traditional symbols in his work upon spending significant time in the port city of Jaffa, where he stayed for a five-week artist residency in 2017. Arab and Israeli friends, as well as Nassar's husband had advised against the residency, due to the organization's acceptance of financing from supporters of illegal Jewish settlements in Palestine. Nassar decided that boycotting the program would not be impactful, and was impressed that the residency's website was inclusive through its Arabic, Hebrew, and English language versions. The residency included an apartment, studio, stipend, and reimbursement of production funds. Nassar used the funds to visit the West Bank, where he purchased embroideries made by elderly craftswomen.

== Personal life ==
Jordan Nassar is married to the Israeli-born artist, Amir Guberstein. The two met while living in Berlin, and their decision to live in New York was spurred by the ruling in United States v. Windsor (2013), the Supreme Court case that overturned the Defense of Marriage Act.

Nassar lives and works in New York City.

== Exhibitions ==
Selected solo exhibitions:

- "THERE”, North Carolina Museum of Art, Winston-Salem (2024)
- "Surge”, Anat Ebgi Gallery, Los Angeles (2024)
- "The Field Is Infinite”, KMAC Museum, Louisville (2021)
- "Fantasy And Truth”, ICA / Institute for Contemporary Art Boston (2022)
- “To Light The Sky”, James Cohan Gallery, New York City (2022)
- "A Sun To Come", Anat Ebgi Gallery, Los Angeles (2022)
- "I Cut The Sky In Two", James Cohan Gallery, New York City (2020)
- "We Are The Ones To Go To The Mountain", Anat Ebgi Gallery, Los Angeles (2020)
- "Night", ADAA: The Art Show with James Cohan Gallery, New York City (2020)
- "The Sea Beneath Our Eyes", The Center for Contemporary Art, Tel Aviv (2019)
- "Between Sky And Earth", Princeton Art Museum, New Jersey (2019)
- "For Your Eyes", The Third Line, Dubai (2019)
- "Spirits Rebellious", Frieze Art Fair (New York) with Anat Ebgi Gallery (2018)
- "Dunya", Anat Ebgi, Los Angeles (2017)
- "Jaffa: New Works", Artport Tel Aviv (2017)
- "No Secret with Mika Horibuchi", LVL3 Gallery, Chicago (2016)
- "And a Night", Evelyn Yard, London (2015)

He was included in group exhibitions at the Whitney Museum of American Art, (Making Knowing: Craft in Art, 1950–2019), Asia Society, Princeton University Art Museum, Katonah Museum of Art, the Laband Art Gallery at Loyola Marymount University, the Abrons Art Center,MOCA Los Angeles, and Supportico Lopez in Berlin.

== Residencies ==
- 2022 – Shangri La Museum of Islamic Art, Culture & Design, Honolulu, Hawaii
- 2017 – Artport Tel Aviv, Israel
- 2016 – ACE AIR, Ace Hotel, New York City

== Collections ==
Nassar's work is included in the collections of the Whitney Museum of American Art (New York), Los Angeles County Museum of Art (Los Angeles), Museum of Contemporary Art, Los Angeles, Institute of Contemporary Art, Boston, Rhode Island School of Design Museum (Providence), Rollins Museum of Art (Winter Park, Florida), Dallas Museum of Art, Des Moines Art Center, Buffalo AKG Art Museum, the Israel Museum (Tel Aviv), the Marciano Foundation (Los Angeles), and Fundación Medianoche (Singapore), among others.

== Awards ==
In 2022, Nassar received the United States Artists Fellowship in Craft.

== Publications ==
Nassar has self-published a number of artist's books and zines, including:

- A Whole New World (2016)
- We Were Here First (2016)
- Bellevue (2016)
- Any Other Rose (2016)
- Messenger of the Gods (2016)
- Kahlil Gibran (2016)
- When It's Naked (2015)
- Ma Rose Apocalypse (2015)

== See also ==
- Islamic embroidery
- Palestinian handicrafts
- Palestinian Americans
