= Art-Rite =

New York arts magazine from the 1970s

- First issue: 1973
- Final issue: 1978
- Country: New York City, New York U.S.
- Language: English
- ISSN: 0736-8755
- OCLC: 27231034

Art-Rite magazine cover by Alan Suicide for issue no. 13, 1977

Art-Rite was a cheaply produced newsprint art magazine that was published from 1973 to 1978. Located in downtown New York City, it was distributed freely there. Its editors were Mike (Walter) Robinson, Edit DeAk, and Joshua Cohn. Cohn dropped out of Art-Rite relatively early.

== Formation and Trajectory ==
DeAk, Robinson, and Cohn met in 1972 in an art criticism class taught by Brian O'Doherty at Barnard College in New York. Based on this experience, the magazine took an agglomerative ground-level view of the art world. The editors often wrote anonymously, reflecting a collaborative process. Indeed, Art-Rite had a collaborative relationship with the art world (particularly with its own generation) and had a close relationship with the post-minimal and post-conceptual downtown art community that was in the process of moving away from formalism and towards an art of appropriation.

Art-Rite appeared irregularly; according to a subscription flier, there were to be four to nine issues per year. Some appeared out of sequence, and #16 was never published. The magazine ceased publication in 1978. A facsimile edition published in 2019 includes the complete collection of twenty issues of the underground arts magazine.

== Covers ==
The magazine was famous for its covers, made by such artists as Alan Suicide, Carl Andre, Dorothea Rockburne, William Wegman, Christo, Vito Acconci, Pat Steir, Joseph Beuys, Judy Rifka, Robert Ryman, Rosemary Mayer, and Ed Ruscha.
