= Crossing the BLVD =

Book by Warren Lehrer and Judith Sloan

- Author: Warren Lehrer, Judith Sloan
- Publisher: W.W. Norton
- Publication date: 2003

Crossing the BLVD: strangers, neighbors, aliens in a new America is a book by Warren Lehrer and Judith Sloan published in 2003 by W.W. Norton that focuses on the cultural experiences and stories of first-generation immigrants in the Queens borough of New York. It was the winner of the 2004 Brendan Gill Prize.

It documents the lives of 79 immigrants living in Queens, each with a story to tell. The first-person narratives are drawn from audio-taped interviews, while the book's ever-changing graphics and typefaces mirror the rich pastiche of religion, language and tradition that coexists in the borough. Among the subjects: a Nigerian Pentecostal "prophetess," public school teachers recruited from Austria, a lawyer from Columbia who delivers food and six exiled Chinese women who practice the gentle exercises of Falun Gong in a schoolyard.

The book was developed into an exhibition and performance which toured throughout the United States from 2004 through 2012 after opening at the Queens Museum of Art, in Flushing Meadows Park, Queens, NY.

- NPR: https://www.npr.org/2004/06/01/1918185/crossing-the-blvd-a-poem-to-a-haitian-brother
- review: reading room https://web.archive.org/web/20080905131347/http://www.communityarts.net/readingroom/archivefiles/2006/04/street_cred_two.php
- review: http://www.forward.com/articles/6885/
- NPR: https://www.npr.org/2004/03/15/1767484/crossing-the-boulevard-cargo-man-from-the-congo
