= Peter Brant II =

American socialite and model

- Born: Peter Mark Brant Jr. December 30, 1993 (age 32); New York City, U.S.
- Education: Bard College
- Occupations: Socialite; model
- Parents: Peter Brant (father); Stephanie Seymour (mother)

Peter Mark Brant Jr. (born December 30, 1993) is an American socialite and model.

== Life and career ==
Peter Mark Brant Jr. was born December 30, 1993, and raised in Greenwich, Connecticut. He is the son of art collector Peter M. Brant and model Stephanie Seymour. His paternal grandparents were Bulgarian Jewish immigrants.

In 2011, Brant publicly came out as gay.

In 2014, Brant was quoted in a Harper's Bazaar profile of him, his brother Harry and mother, Stephanie, about enjoying his clan's notoriety, "We had to do a report about our parents: where they were born, what they did, and all that. Everyone else had to do theirs as homework, but I finished mine before class ended using Wikipedia."

Brant attended Bard College in Annandale-on-Hudson, New York.

In 2015, Peter along with his younger brother Harry, in collaboration with Mac Cosmetics, launched a unisex cosmetics line aimed at the gender fluid youth movement.

In March 2016, Brant was arrested at John F. Kennedy International Airport after a "drunken ruckus", during which he assaulted a police officer. Brant's lawyer referred to him as an "idiot."
