= Stephanie Seymour =

American model and actress

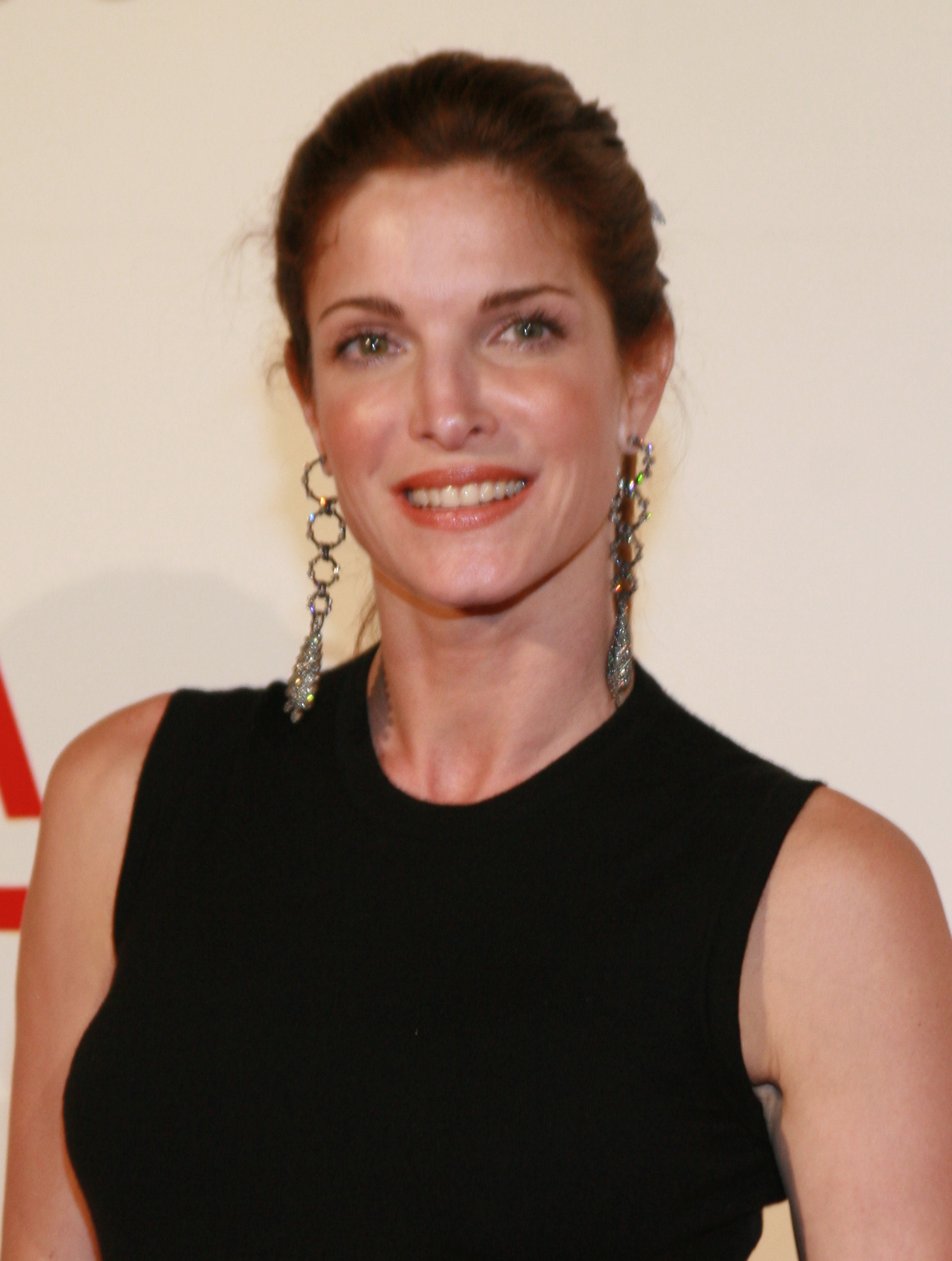
- Seymour in 2008
- Born: July 23, 1968 (age 58); San Diego, California, U.S.
- Occupations: Model; actress
- Years active: 1983–present
- Spouse: Tommy Andrews (m. 1989; div. 1990) Peter Brant (m. 1995)
- Children: 4; including Peter II
- Modeling information
- Height: 5 ft 10 in (1.78 m)
- Hair color: Brown
- Eye color: Blue/Gray
- Agency: IMG Models (New York, Paris, Milan, London, Sydney)

Stephanie Michelle Seymour (born July 23, 1968) is an American model and actress. During the 1980s and 1990s, she was one of the most popular supermodels, being featured in the Sports Illustrated Swimsuit Issue and on the cover of Vogue, as well as being a former Victoria's Secret Angel. She had a book published about beauty tips and has participated in advertising campaigns for clothing and cosmetic products. In 2017, Seymour launched her own line of lingerie. She has ventured into acting with one appearance in each medium of film, television, and video games.

== Early life and career ==
Born in San Diego, California, the middle child of a California real estate developer father and hairstylist mother, Seymour started her modeling career working for local newspapers and department stores in her hometown. In 1983, at 15, she was a finalist at the inaugural Elite Model Management Look of the Year modeling contest (now called Elite Model Look).

In the late 1980s and early 1990s, Seymour appeared in numerous issues of the Sports Illustrated Swimsuit Issue and on the cover of Vogue as well. During the same period, Seymour was a primary lingerie and hosiery model for the relatively new Victoria's Secret company in its mail-order catalogs and retail stores. In March 1991, and again in February 1993, Seymour posed for Playboy. She was one of the most famous supermodels of the 1980s and 1990s along with Kate Moss, Naomi Campbell, Linda Evangelista, Christy Turlington, Helena Christensen, Cindy Crawford, and Claudia Schiffer. Vanity Fair would later have several of these models appear on the cover of an issue photographed by Mario Testino, called "A League Of Their Own".

In the 2006 book In Vogue: The Illustrated History of the World's Most Famous Fashion Magazine, the editors cite the "original supermodels" and Seymour when quoting Vogue editor-in-chief Anna Wintour, who said, "Those girls were so fabulous for fashion and totally reflected that time ... [They] were like movie stars." The editors name famous models from previous decades, but explain that, "None of them attained the fame and worldwide renown bestowed on Linda Evangelista, Christy Turlington, Cindy Crawford, Naomi Campbell, Tatjana Patitz, Stephanie Seymour, Claudia Schiffer, Yasmeen Ghauri, and Karen Mulder in the late 1980s and early 1990s. These models burst out beyond the pages of the magazines. Many became the faces of cosmetics brands and perfumes, had their own television programs and physical-fitness videos and their own lines of lingerie. Their lives, activities, influences, and images were the subjects of all types of sociological and historical analysis."

In 1998, Seymour wrote Stephanie Seymour's Beauty Secrets for Dummies. In 2000, Seymour was ranked #91 on the North American FHM 100 Sexiest Women of 2000 list. In 2006, she appeared in a campaign for Gap with her children.

Salvatore Ferragamo's creative campaign for its fall/winter 2007/2008 collection featured Seymour and Claudia Schiffer, shot on location in Italy with Mario Testino. In the promotional photos, the supermodels play film stars protected by bodyguards and pursued by the paparazzi. Seymour was joined by other fellow supermodels Naomi Campbell, Kate Moss, Linda Evangelista, Daria Werbowy, Christy Turlington, and Amber Valletta for the September 2013 issue of Interview magazine titled "Model".

In 2014, Seymour was named a global spokesmodel for Estée Lauder.

Seymour co-founded and launched the lingerie line Raven & Sparrow in 2017. The line features high-end, vintage-inspired pieces designed for comfort, ranging from camisoles and rompers to silk robes and nightgowns. It is available exclusively at Barneys New York.

=== Acting ===
Seymour's first acting role was as explosives expert Cynna Stone in the video game Hell: A Cyberpunk Thriller. She played the unusual part of a live actor in a game whose characters and scenery were nearly all CG renders.

In 2000, Seymour played Helen Frankenthaler in the movie Pollock. In 2002, she played the role of Sara Lindstrom in the "Crazy" episode of Law & Order: Criminal Intent.

== Personal life ==
At the age of 14, she began dating 40 year old John Casablancas, the head of Elite Model Management, who was, at the time, married to model Jeanette Christiansen. They began their relationship when Seymour was 16.

From 1989 to 1990, she was married to guitarist Tommy Andrews. They have a son together named Dylan.

By mid-1991, she had become involved with Axl Rose, the lead singer of Guns N' Roses. She appeared in two music videos by Guns N' Roses: "Don't Cry" and "November Rain". The couple were engaged, but they broke up in February 1993. In August 1993, Rose sued Seymour, claiming she assaulted him and stole more than $100,000 worth of jewelry. Seymour countersued stating that he was physically abusive. Seymour subpoenaed Erin Everly, Rose's ex-wife, to testify that she was also abused by him. The lawsuits were eventually settled.

In 1993, Seymour began dating businessman Peter Brant, who was married and the father of five children. She gave birth to the couple's first son, Peter II, in December 1993. After his divorce was finalized, Seymour and Brant married in July 1995 in Paris. Seymour gave birth to a second son, Harry, in 1996, and a daughter in 2004. In March 2009, Seymour filed for divorce after almost 14 years of marriage, but the couple reconciled in 2010. In January 2021, their son Harry died at age 24 from an accidental prescription medication overdose, after struggling with addiction for several years.

== Filmography ==
Video game
| Year | Title | Role | Notes |
|---|---|---|---|
| 1994 | Hell: A Cyberpunk Thriller | Cynna Stone | |
Film
| Year | Film | Role | Notes |
| 2000 | Pollock | Helen Frankenthaler | |
Television
| Year | Title | Role | Notes |
| 2002 | Law & Order: Criminal Intent | Sara Lindstrom | Episode: "Crazy" |
