= Peter Brant =

American businessman (born 1947)

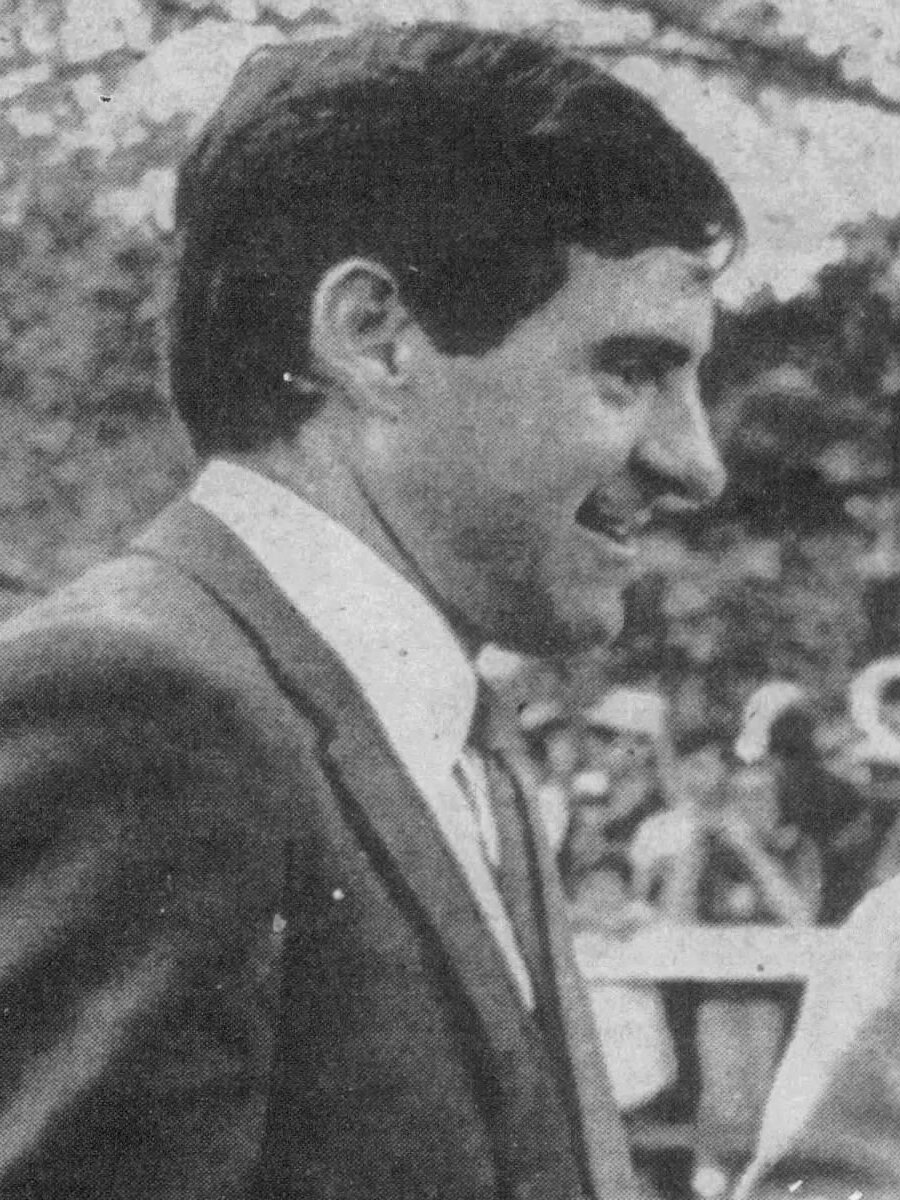
- Brant, c. 1984
- Born: Peter Mark Brant; March 1, 1947 (age 79); New York City, U.S.
- Education: University of Colorado Boulder
- Occupation: Chairman of Brant Foundation
- Spouses: Sandra Brant (m. 1969; div. 1995) Stephanie Seymour (m. 1995)
- Children: 8, including Peter

Peter Mark Brant (born March 1, 1947) is an American industrialist and art collector. He was also a magazine publisher until 2018 and a film producer and polo player. He is married to model Stephanie Seymour.

== Early life and education ==
Brant was raised in Jamaica Estates, Queens, the son of Lily and Murray Brant. Both parents were Jewish immigrants from Bulgaria. Brant's father co-founded the paper converter (primarily converting paper into newsprint) Brant-Allen Industries with his brother-in-law (father of H. Joseph Allen). He has one sister, Irene Brant Zelinsky. Brant was a childhood friend of U.S. president Donald Trump.

He attended the University of Colorado but did not graduate; rather, he left school to work for his father's company.

== Career ==
=== Newsprint ===
Brant went to work at Brant-Allen Industries, a paper conversion company co-founded by his father. In the early 1970s, Brant and his cousin, H. Joseph Allen — the son of Murray Brant's business partner — led the company into the manufacturing side of the business and expanded the company into paper mill (converting pulp into paper) ownership purchasing a mill in Rivière-du-Loup, Quebec and partnering with the Washington Post and Dow Jones to purchase a mill in Ashland, Virginia.

In the early 2000s, as paper demand continued to decline, Brant embarked on a buying spree purchasing a second Quebec mill in 2004 for $205 million (from Enron) and a third Quebec mill in 2006 for $135 million. In 2008, he bought out his partner and changed the name of the company to White Birch Paper Company. Also in 2008, he purchased SP Newsprint Co for $305 million, a newsprint manufacturer with operations in Oregon and Georgia. The purchase gave Brant control of 22% of the North American newsprint market, second to AbitibiBowater with 43%. Brant expanded SP Newsprint into paper recycling operating 23 recycling facilities through its SP Recycling unit.

In a court filing around 2007, Brant said the ailing newsprint market and the recession had slashed his net worth to less than $500 million from $1.4 billion that year.

In February 2010, White Birch Paper restructured under Chapter 11 proceedings, due to excessive debt and declining demand for newsprint. The company emerged from bankruptcy in January 2012 and closed its main pulp and paper mill in Quebec City, sending home more than 600 workers. White Birch owns two other mills in Quebec, Canada and one in Ashland, Virginia. In 2012, Brant pledged a portion of his art collection as security to purchase White Birch Paper out of bankruptcy in partnership with Black Diamond Capital Management LLC for $94.5 million in cash and $78 million in debt. Brant remains as CEO of White Birch Paper.

In November 2011, SP Newsprint Co filed for Chapter 11 bankruptcy due to excessive debt and declining demand for newsprint. SP Newsprint operates two mills in Dublin, Georgia and Newberg, Oregon and 23 recycling facilities. In September 2012, SP Newsprint was purchased out of bankruptcy by SP Fiber Technologies LLC for an undisclosed amount.

In May 2016, Brant, as Art Media Holdings, merged the magazine Art in America with its principal competitor ARTnews. Artnet reported his company announced that ARTnews would go to a quarterly publication schedule, down from monthly. The latter had run an article asking whether the Brant Foundation was a tax scam or an art investment vehicle.

In May 2017, White Birch Paper announced that it would idle paper making operations at its Bear Island newsprint mill in Ashland, Virginia. The mill produced 240,000 metric tons of newsprint annually.

In 2018, Penske Media Corporation, the parent company of Variety magazine, acquired ARTnews and Art in America from Brant.

=== Brant Publications, Inc. ===
Brant was the owner and chairman of Brant Publications, Inc., located in New York City, founded in 1983. BPI published various magazines:

- Interview was founded by artist Andy Warhol and John Wilcock in late 1969. For a brief period in the 1970s, Brant and his wife Sandra Brant invested in Interview. Brant Publications acquired Interview from Warhol's estate in 1989. In 2018, a company owned by Brant, Singleton LLC, purchased Interview magazine out of bankruptcy.
- Art in America was acquired by Brant Publications in 1984.
- The magazine Antiques is a monthly arts publication that focuses on architecture, interior design, and fine and decorative arts. Regular monthly columns include news on current exhibitions and art-world events, notes on collecting, and book reviews. The magazine was founded in 1922 and underwent a complete redesign in 2009.
- Modern, was launched in 2009 and is a magazine devoted to design, decorative arts and architecture.

=== Film producer ===
Brant's interest in art also led him to film production. He was a producer of the films L’Amour (1972) directed by Paul Morrissey, and Andy Warhol's Bad (1977) directed by Jed Johnson. Brant invested $800,000 in Bad, and when the film was a commercial failure it caused a rift in their friendship. Brant blamed Warhol for "not giving his all to the project, and proceeded to put five big Warhols up for auction at Sotheby’s in 1978." In September 1981, Warhol stated in his diary: "I had to meet Peter Brant for lunch at the office. ... He picked out some prints, and now we're all settled with him on the money he invested in Bad and he never has to come back. Good."

Brant was an executive producer of the award-winning films Basquiat (1996) and Pollock (2000). He was also co-producer of the Peabody- and Emmy Award-winning PBS documentary, Andy Warhol: A Documentary (2006). Brant was also a producer of The Homesman (2014).

== Art collection and the Brant Foundation ==
Brant is one of the world's Top 200 art collectors. He bought his first pieces of art after turning an $8,000 investment into several hundred thousand dollars as a young man. His first purchases according to The New York Times, included "a couple of Warhols and, later, a major Franz Kline.” In 1970, his painting Campbell's Soup Can With Peeling Label (1962) by Andy Warhol sold for $60,000 at an auction, making Warhol the most expensive American artist alive at the time. In 1976, Brant commissioned Warhol to paint his cocker spaniel, Ginger. Warhol made two paintings of Ginger, as well as drawings. Brant is one of the largest collector's of Warhol's art.

Brant is a member of the Advisory Council of the Andy Warhol Museum in Pittsburgh. The Museum of Contemporary Art in Los Angeles named Brant to its board of trustees in December 2009. He has also served on the Board of Trustees at the Guggenheim Museum, as well as the Chairman's Council at the Museum of Modern Art.

Brant's collection is on display to the public at the two locations of the Brant Foundation Art Study Center, in Greenwich, Connecticut and the East Village neighborhood of Manhattan. His collection includes numerous works by Warhol, Jean-Michel Basquiat, Jeff Koons, Dan Flavin, Glenn Ligon, and Cady Noland. Brant is one of Basquiat's major collectors. In 2020, he sold his Basquiat painting Boy and Dog in a Johnnypump (1982) to Ken Griffin for more than $100 million.

== Kentucky Derby and polo ==
Brant was a member of the partnership who owned Classic winner Swale, who won both the 1984 Kentucky Derby and Belmont Stakes and was American Champion Three-Year-Old Colt that year. In addition, Brant was responsible for bringing stallion Mr. Prospector to Claiborne Farm in Paris, Kentucky. Mr. Prospector, who began his stud career in Florida in 1975, went on to be one of the most influential sires in the American Stud-Book since the first of his progeny began racing in 1978. Brant was the breeder of 1995 Kentucky Derby winner Thunder Gulch. Thunder Gulch is the son of Gulch out of the mare Line of Thunder, who were both owned and bred by Brant.

Brant is also a polo player and at one time was the highest-rated amateur player in the U.S. Brant is the co-founder of the Greenwich Polo Club, the Saratoga Polo Association, and the Bridgehampton Polo Club.

== Personal life ==
=== Marriages ===
Brant's first marriage was to Sandra "Sandy" Simms, whom he met while attending the University of Colorado. They married in 1969 and their divorce was finalized in 1995. She later married writer Ingrid Sischy.

On July 14, 1995, Brant married model Stephanie Seymour outside of Paris, with gallery owner Tony Shafrazi serving as best man at the ceremony. In 2009, the couple filed for divorce, but subsequently reconciled in 2010.

=== Children ===
Brant had eight biological children with his two wives, and one stepchild.

Brant and Sandra Brant had five children together. Four of their children have worked for Brant companies:

- Ryan (1971–2019) as director of Brant Publications. He also founded Take-Two Interactive at age 21. He was CEO until 2001, and left the company in 2006. He died in March 2019 at the age of 47, due to cardiac arrest caused by aspiration.
- Lindsay (born 1973), an artist and nurse, has not worked for a Brant company
- Christopher (born 1980) as president of White Birch
- Kelly (born 1980) as online director of Brant Publications
- Allison (born 1980) as director of the Brant Foundation, and manager of her father's art collection

Brant and Stephanie Seymour had two sons and one daughter together, and Brant is stepfather to Seymour's son:

- Peter Brant Jr. (born December 30, 1993)
- Harry (1996–2021), who died in January 2021 at the age of 24 as a result of a prescription drug addiction.
- Lily (born October 27, 2004).
- Dylan Andrews is Seymour's son from first marriage to guitarist Tom Andrews.

=== Tax evasion ===
In 1990, Brant was investigated for tax evasion resulting from having his company pay for $1 million in personal expenditures. He pleaded guilty to charges of failing to keep records and was sentenced to three months in a federal prison and $200,000 in fines.
