= Sandra Brant =

American business executive (born 1947)

- Born: Sandra Simms; June 16, 1947 (age 78)
- Spouses: Peter Brant (m. 1969; div. 1995) Ingrid Sischy (m. 2015)
- Children: 5

Sandra J. Brant (née Simms; born June 17, 1947) is an American former business executive. Brant was the chief executive, president and publisher of Brant Publications. Brant and her husband Peter Brant purchased Andy Warhol's Interview magazine in 1989. She resigned in 2008, and alongside her partner Ingrid Sischy, she was an editor of the international editions of Vanity Fair and Vogue.

== Biography ==
Sandra "Sandy" Simms was born in Arcadia, California on June 17, 1947. She met her husband Peter Brant while attending the University of Colorado in Boulder, Colorado, but neither of them graduated. They married in 1969 and moved to Manhattan.

Sandy Brant worked as the director of advertising for Andy Warhol's Interview, and for a period in the 1970s, they invested in the publication. Peter Brant was a producer of Andy Warhol's films L’Amour (1972) and Bad (1977).

Sandy Brant was a close friend of Warhol's partner Jed Johnson who directed Bad. They collaborated on decorating Peter Brant and Joe Allen's office building in Greenwich. In the late 1970s, the Brants purchased a house with Johnson in Vail, Colorado. Johnson also decorated their White Birch Farm home in Greenwich in 1983.

As a guest curator with Elissa Cullman, she organized the exhibitions Andy Warhol's Folk and Funk (1977) and Small Folk: A Celebration of Childhood In America (1980) at the American Folk Art Museum.

Peter and Sandy Brant acquired Antiques magazine in 1983 and Art in America in 1984 through their privately held venture, Brant Publications. In 1989, Brant Publications Inc. acquired Interview magazine from the estate of Andy Warhol for $10 million.

In January 2008, Brant sold her 50 percent share of Brant Publications to co-owner, former husband Peter Brant. She resigned from her role of chief executive, president and publisher of Brant Publications in February 2008. Following this decision, her longtime partner Ingrid Sischy, who had been Interview's editor-in-chief since 1990, also resigned. Shortly after Brant and Sischy became international editors of Italian Vanity Fair, German Vanity Fair, and Spanish Vanity Fair. In 2009, they were named international editors of German Vogue and Russian Vogue.

In 2015, Brant married Sischy, who died from breast cancer later that year on July 24, 2015. They were both godparents to Elton John's son, Zachary.

Sandy Brant and Peter Brant had five children. Take-Two Interactive was founded by their son, Ryan, who was born in 1971. In March 2019, he died from aspiration-induced cardiac arrest.
