= GalleryBeat TV =

American documentary television series from 1993 to 2003

GalleryBeat TV was a public access television show covering the art scene in New York City from 1993 to 2003. The show was hosted by Paul Hasegawa-Overacker (also known as Paul H-O). The show, which produced over 130 episodes, covered art openings in Manhattan art galleries by speaking with gallery-goers and talking to artists, including Julian Schnabel, who said on camera that the show was "idiotic." The show also featured cooking segments, an interview with The New York Times art critic Roberta Smith, Brice Marden, Spencer Tunick, recorded street protests by the Guerrilla Girls and a visit to the Gramercy Art Fair. The show was noted for having "a gonzo, nobody’s-watching-anyway spirit" and one of the goals of GalleryBeat TV was to question the art beyond "whatever’s in the press release." Kathy Lebowitz and New York artist Walter Robinson were also a correspondents for the show.

== Documentary ==
The show was turned into a documentary film made in 2008 called Guest of Cindy Sherman, where Paul H-O documents his life as the boyfriend of New York artist Cindy Sherman. The film has been called "a requiem for a time before big money ruined the art world."
