= Walter Robinson (artist) =

American painter (1950–2025)

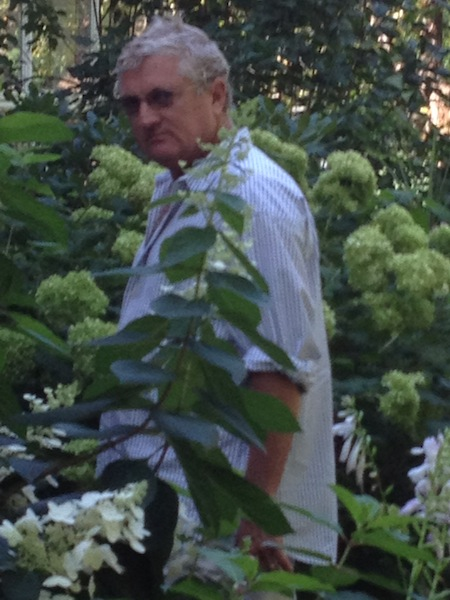
- Robinson in 2012
- Born: Walter Rossiter Robinson III; July 18, 1950; Wilmington, Delaware, U.S.
- Died: February 9, 2025 (aged 74); New York City, U.S.
- Other name: Mike Robinson
- Education: Columbia University
- Occupations: Painter; publisher; art curator; art writer

Walter Rossiter Robinson III (July 18, 1950 – February 9, 2025), also known as Mike Robinson, was an American painter, publisher, art curator, and art writer, based in New York City. He was called a Neo-pop painter, as well as a member of the 1980s Pictures Generation. Robinson was the subject of the 632 page book A Kiss Before Dying: Walter Robinson – A Painter of Pictures and Arbiter of Critical Pleasures by Richard Milazzo published in 2021 with an Italian translation by Ginevra Quadrio Curzio. In 2025, Robinson was bestowed a posthumous doctorate degree in Fine Art from the New York Academy of Art, who also created The Walter Robinson Scholarship in his name.

== Background ==
Robinson was born in Wilmington, Delaware, on July 18, 1950, and was raised in Tulsa, Oklahoma. He moved to New York City to attend Columbia University in 1968. Subsequently, he graduated from the Whitney Independent Study Program in 1973. He lived in SoHo in the 1970s and on Ludlow Street on the Lower East Side in the 1980s and 1990s, and lived uptown with a studio in Long Island City in Queens.

== Painting career ==
Robinson was a postmodern painter whose work features painterly images taken from covers of romance novel paperbacks as well as still lifes of cheeseburgers, French fries, and beer, and pharmaceutical products such as aspirin and nasal spray. He also made and exhibited large-scale spin paintings in the mid-1980s, in advance of his colleague Damien Hirst.

A 2014 touring exhibition of Robinson's paintings included more than 90 works dating from 1979 to 2014. It premiered at the University Galleries at Illinois State University in Normal, Illinois, and subsequently appeared in Philadelphia at the Moore College of Art. The show's final stop was at the Jeffrey Deitch Gallery in New York City in September 2016.

Robinson's works have been exhibited at several New York galleries since the 1980s, including Semaphore Gallery and Metro Pictures Gallery. An exhibition of his paintings, paired with a poem by Charles Bukowski, "There's a Bluebird in My Heart", was on view in Spring 2016 at the Owen James Gallery in Greenpoint, Brooklyn. In 2026, Robinson received posthumously a retropective art exhibition at Gallery Jeffrey Deitch in New York City.

== Art criticism and other activities ==
Robinson began writing about art in the 1970s, when he co-founded with Edit DeAk the art zine Art-Rite in New York's SoHo art district.

Robinson subsequently served as news editor of Art in America magazine (1980–96) and founding editor of Artnet magazine (1996–2012). In 2013–14, he was a columnist for Artspace.com, where his seminal essay on "Zombie Formalism" appeared. He also served as art editor of the East Village Eye in the early 1980s.

Robinson was also active in Collaborative Projects (aka Colab) in the early 1980s, acting as president for a short time and participating in The Times Square Show.

In the 1990s, he was a correspondent for GalleryBeat TV, a public-access television show.

== Personal life and death ==
Robinson was married four times; his second wife, Beatrice Smith, was sculptor Tony Smith's daughter. She died from AIDS-related complications in 1988, and after her death, Robinson adopted her daughter. At the time of his death, he lived in Manhattan with his fourth wife, Lisa Rosen.

Robinson died from liver cancer (also reported as esophageal cancer) at home on February 9, 2025, at the age of 74.
