= Contemporary Artists' Books Conference =

New York librarians event

The Contemporary Artists' Books Conference (CABC) was started in 2008 by a volunteer group of librarians belonging to the New York Chapter of the Art Libraries Society of North America (ARLIS/NY). It has been held annually during the New York Art Book Fair as part of its special programming since 2009.

== History ==
The Contemporary Artists’ Book Conference (CABC) presents in-depth talks, panels, and conversations to further the critical dialog surrounding artists’ books. The CABC committee is made up of historians, art librarians, artists, and professionals in the field and sessions cover a range of lively topics presented by artists, scholars, and other leading figures.

Initiated in 2008 by a volunteer committee of art librarians from the New York area, the Contemporary Artists' Book Conference held its first conference at the Museum of Modern Art with a keynote interview of Hans-Ulrich Obrist interviewing Joseph Grigely & Rirkrit Tiravanija. James Mitchell, formerly of the Metropolitan Museum of Art; Jennifer Tobias, Milan Hughston and David Senior of the Museum of Modern Art Library; Deirdre Donohue and Matthew Carson of the International Center of Photography; Ryan Haley of the New York Public Library; Deirdre Lawrence of the Brooklyn Museum Library; and Tony White of the Maryland Institute College of Art. Stephen J. Bury of the Frick Art Reference Library joined the committee in 2010.

Beginning in 2009, the conference was organized in partnership with Printed Matter's New York Art Book Fair as part of the Fair's public programming. The CABC was also included in Printed Matter's LA Art Book Fair beginning in 2014.

In 2020 Center for Book Arts assumed administrative responsibility for CABC in collaboration with the CABC committee while continuing the program partnership with Printed Matter and the New York Art Book Fair.

== Programming ==
Although the programming for the conference varies from year to year, all conferences are united by their focus on emerging practices and issues within art-book culture. In addition to organizing the annual conference, CABC's planning committee commissions a new artists’ book as part of its program. Previously commissioned artists include James Hoff, Eve Fowler, Dexter Sinister, David Horvitz, Triin Tamm and Emily Roysdon, and the assembled magazine Adventures, produced by Aaron Flint Jamison.
