= Ingrid Sischy =

South African-American writer and editor (1952–2015)

- Born: Ingrid Barbara Sischy; March 2, 1952; Johannesburg, Transvaal, South Africa
- Died: July 24, 2015 (aged 63); New York City, U.S.
- Citizenship: South Africa; United States
- Occupations: Writer; art critic; editor
- Years active: 1978–2015
- Known for: Artforum (1979–1988); The New Yorker (1988–1996); Interview (1989–2008); Vanity Fair (1997–2015)
- Spouse: Sandra Brant (m. 2015)

Ingrid Barbara Sischy (/ˈsɪʃi/; March 2, 1952 – July 24, 2015) was a South African-born American writer and editor who specialized in covering art, photography, and fashion. She rose to prominence as the editor of Artforum from 1979 to 1988, and was editor-in-chief of Andy Warhol's Interview Magazine from 1989 to 2008. Until her death in 2015, she and her partner Sandra Brant edited the Italian, Spanish and German editions of Vanity Fair.

== Early life ==
Sischy was born in Johannesburg to Ben Sischy, a family doctor who became an expert in radiation oncology, and Claire Sischy, a speech therapist. She had two older brothers, Mark Sischy, a lawyer who lived in Scotland, and David Sischy, a doctor. Her family was of Lithuanian-Jewish origins and had immigrated from the Pale of Settlement in then Lithuania.

In 1961, when Sischy was nine years old, the Sischy family left apartheid-era South Africa after the Sharpeville massacre and moved to Edinburgh, Scotland, where Dr. Sischy re-trained as a radiologist. The family had had to leave South Africa because Sischy's mother was in danger of being arrested for her involvement in an activist group, the Black Sash, that non-violently protested apartheid. In 1967, the family moved to Rochester, New York, where Sischy's father became the head of radiation oncology at Highland Hospital.

While in Scotland, Sischy attended George Watson's Ladies College. In Rochester, she graduated from Brighton High School. Sischy started college at Sarah Lawrence College. She also took writing classes with Grace Paley. Sischy graduated from Sarah Lawrence in 1973.

She received an honorary PhD in the humanities from the Moore College of Art in 1987.

== Career ==
After graduating from college, Sischy took a series of odd jobs and entry-level positions in the art world, including at galleries. She became the circulation coordinator at Print Collector's Newsletter, an art world industry resource, and was promoted to the role of editor, contributing reviews of art shows New York City. She was hired, and almost immediately fired, by the Guggenheim Museum in New York, where the dress code and atmosphere made her feel untrue to herself. She then worked at Printed Matter, Inc, a nonprofit book publisher that introduced her to artists like Sol LeWitt, Jenny Holzer, and many emerging artists.

=== Museum of Modern Art ===
In 1978, Sischy interned at The Museum of Modern Art (MoMA) under a National Endowment for the Arts curation grant focusing on photography exhibits, one called "In the Twenties: Portraits From the Photography Department", and another on photographer Ansel Adams. During this time, she was mentored by John Szarkowski, the Director of the Department of Photography at MoMA.

=== Artforum ===
In 1979, at the age of 27, Sischy was appointed editor-in-chief of Artforum magazine by businessman and publisher Anthony Korner and Amy Baker Sandback. Sischy tapped into the downtown art scene and advised on covers and content, often written by artists. Sischy edited Artforum for eight years. Sischy was profiled at length by the critic and journalist Janet Malcolm in The New Yorker.

=== The New Yorker ===
She left Artforum in 1988, to become a consulting editor at The New Yorker and work on the AIDS virus, which had begun to decimate the downtown artist community. From 1988–1996, she worked at The New Yorker, reporting on fashion and art.

=== Interview Magazine ===
In 1989, Sischy became the editor of Interview, a downtown magazine founded by Andy Warhol in 1969. During her tenure at Interview, covers of the magazine became noted by the press.

In 1996, she was named Artistic Director of the inaugural Florence Fashion Biennale, where she organized an exhibition that showed work in 20+ museums in the Florence, Italy area. Part of this exhibition was later presented at the Guggenheim Museum Soho.

In 2008, Sischy resigned from Interview magazine amidst much press and speculation after CEO and publisher Sandra Brant, Sischy's longtime partner, sold her 50 percent stake in its parent company.

=== Vanity Fair ===
Sischy was a contributing editor to Vanity Fair from 1997 until her death in 2015. Sischy and Brant were the international editor of Condé Nast, writing for the Spanish, French, and Italian versions of Vanity Fair, and the German and Russian versions of Vogue.

=== Other activities ===
Sischy was a member of an all-female art band called Disband, founded in 1978 by artists and writers. She was featured in the 2011 documentary film !Women Art Revolution, where she discussed her contributions to the feminist movement of female artists in the 1970s.

She was a widely published author on a range of cultural subjects and contributed to several periodicals, including The New York Times and Vanity Fair and was at one time the fashion and photography critic for The New Yorker.

In 2013, Sischy was given the "Fashion Scoop of the Year" Award (for her Vanity Fair piece on John Galliano) at the Fashion Media Awards by the photographer Bruce Weber.

== Personal life ==
Although she was in at least one long-term relationship with a woman from the time she was in college, it was in a New Yorker review of the photographer Robert Mapplethorpe's show "The Perfect Moment" that Sischy came out publicly as a lesbian in 1989.

Sischy described the chronic battles of her brother, Mark Sischy, with alcoholism in her interview with designer John Galliano, who was newly sober.

In 2015, Sischy married her longtime partner of over 25 years, Sandra Brant.

Brant was formerly married to Brant Publications' owner, Peter M. Brant, who was the publisher of Interview Magazine. Sischy and Sandra Brant lived in Greenwich Village and in Montauk in a cottage designed by Stanford White. They were godmothers to Elton John and David Furnish's son.

== Death ==
Sischy died on July 24, 2015, at Memorial Sloan Kettering Cancer Center in Manhattan from breast cancer at the age of 63. She is buried at Green-Wood Cemetery in Brooklyn, New York.

== Works and publications ==
=== Monographs ===
- Mapplethorpe, Robert, Ingrid Sischy, Richard Howard, and Richard Marshall. Robert Mapplethorpe. London: Secker & Warburg, 1991. ISBN 978-0-436-27361-2 OCLC 24668296
- Wegman, William, and Ingrid Sischy. Fashion Photographs. New York: Harry N. Abrams, Publishers, 1999. ISBN 978-0-810-92944-9 OCLC 41951322
- Sischy, Ingrid. Albert Watson: The Vienna album. Munich: Schirmer Mosel, 2005. ISBN 978-3-829-60215-0 OCLC 492588389
- Sischy, Ingrid. Donna Karan, New York. New York: Assouline, 2005. ISBN 978-2-843-23713-3 OCLC 71147754
- Sischy, Ingrid. Created Equal: Mark Laita. Göttingen: Steidl, 2008. ISBN 978-3-865-21709-7 OCLC 758790716
- Von Unwerth, Ellen, and Ingrid Sischy. Fräulein. 2009, 2015. ISBN 978-3-836-55556-2 OCLC 893896042

=== Selected feature articles ===
- Sischy, Ingred. "Photography White and Black." The New Yorker. November 13, 1989.
- Sischy, Ingrid. "Vintage Wintour." Interview. December 1993.
- Sischy, Ingrid and Gladys Perint Palmer. "Artful Dodger." The New Yorker. April 1, 1996.
- Sischy, Ingrid. "Koons, High and Low." Vanity Fair. March 2001.
- Sischy, Ingrid. "The Rebel in Prada." Vanity Fair. February 2002.
- Sischy, Ingrid. "Why We Love Fashion? It's Genius.; Alexander The Great." The New York Times. February 23, 2003.
- Sischy, Ingrid. "The Space Cadet." The New York Times. August 27, 2006.
- Sischy, Ingrid. "Calvin to the Core." Vanity Fair. April 2008.
- Sischy, Ingrid. "A Man of Darkness and Dreams." Vanity Fair. April 2010.
- Kuo, Michelle and Ingrid Sischy. "Open Book: Michelle Kuo Talks with Ingrid Sischy." Artforum. September 2012.
- Sischy, Ingrid. "Galliano in the Wilderness." Vanity Fair. July 2013.
- Sischy, Ingrid. "The Thriller at Vuitton." Vanity Fair. April 2014.
- Sischy, Ingrid. "The Boy Who Loved Chanel." Vanity Fair. July 2015.

=== Other works ===
- Granet, Ilona, Donna Henes, Ingrid Sischy, Diane Torr, Martha Wilson, Barbara Ess, Daile Kaplan, Barbara Kruger, and Cornelia H. Butler. Disband: 1978–1982. Los Angeles: 2008. (video recording) OCLC 828733411
- Disband. Disband New York, NY: Primary Information, 2009. (CD) OCLC 849685952
- Hershman-Leeson, Lynn, Kyle Stephan, Alexandra Chowaniec, Spain, Krista Lynes, Claire Daigle, and Fiona Summers. W.A.R. Women Art Revolution. New York: Zeitgeist Films, 2010. (documentary) OCLC 878431909
