= Negotiating with the Dead =

2002 nonfiction book by Margaret Atwood

- First edition cover
- Author: Margaret Atwood
- Publisher: Cambridge University Press
- Publication date: 2002
- ISBN: 0-521-66260-5

Negotiating with the Dead: A Writer on Writing is a non-fiction work by Canadian author Margaret Atwood. Cambridge University Press first published it in 2002.

Atwood edited six lectures she gave at the 2000 Empson Lectures at the University of Cambridge into a non-fiction work on writing. In her introduction, she describes the work as being not about how to write or about her own writing, but rather the position a writer finds him or herself in. The book is organized into six chapters drawn from each of the six lectures. Each chapter of the book addresses one question regarding the writer’s position and craft. The book also includes a prologue and an introduction entitled "Into the labyrinth" in which she describes the process of creating this particular work.

Atwood has also created other works of non-fiction from lecture series she has given. Strange Things: The Malevolent North in Canadian Literature was based on a lecture series given at Oxford University.

== Chapters ==
Introduction: Into the labyrinth

Prologue

1 Orientation: Who do you think you are?

What is "a writer," and how did I become one?

2 Duplicity: The jekyll hand, the hyde hand, and the slippery double

Why there are always two

3 Dedication: The Great God Pen

Apollo vs. Mammon: at whose altar should the writer worship?

4 Temptation: Prospero, the Wizard of Oz, Mephisto & Co.

Who waves the wand, pulls the strings, or signs the Devil’s book?

5 Communion: Nobody to Nobody

The eternal triangle: the writer, the reader, and the books as go-between

6 Descent: Negotiating with the dead

Who makes the trip to the Underworld, and why?

== Autobiography ==
Margaret Atwood includes some autobiography in her exploration of the role of the writer. Atwood writes about her childhood and parents, as well as her experiences in high school and at university. She also discusses her early writings, first publications and entry into the literary circle.

Atwood uses personal anecdotes from her own experiences as a writer to discuss the process of an author finding their role as a writer. She describes the less than positive reception of the first play she wrote at the age of seven, and the subsequent attempt to focus her talents on novels. She later describes her process of finding her own niche within the literary world while at university.

Atwood also recounts the books that she had read while growing up as well as her own literary attempts. She states that Edgar Allan Poe, E. Nesbit, and Sherlock Holmes were among her favorites as a child. She also states she had a "wide but indiscriminate" reading list until the age of sixteen that including Jane Austen, Moby Dick and Forever Amber as well as pulp science fiction and True Romance Magazines.

Atwood includes most of her autobiography within the chapter "Orientation." However, she also discusses her childhood and her first publication in her high school magazine in the chapter "Duplicity."

== Literary references ==
Throughout the work Atwood makes an extensive use of quotations and literary references. The book opens with an epigraph containing quotes from the Brothers Grimm, Geoffrey Chaucer and A. M. Klein. Each section of the work opens with epigraph that consists of a collection of quotations pertinent to the addressed topic.

Atwood also addresses many other works of fiction in Negotiating with the Dead. Reviews have noted that "The essays also cover a vast range of readings, as if they comprised an undergraduate survey of the best that has been thought and said in English, Canadian, and (sometimes) European literature." Examples of the works Atwood draws on range from Ian McEwan’s short story "Reflections of A Kept Ape" to The Epic of Gilgamesh. In "Temptation" Atwood spends most of the chapter drawing parallels between the position of the author and the Wizard of Oz from L. Frank Baum’s work, Prospero in Shakespeare’s The Tempest and Henrik Höfgen in Klaus Mann’s Mephisto. At the end of the book, Atwood includes a ten-page bibliography to document her extensive inclusion of literature.

Atwood also includes numerous other Canadian authors in her work. Some of these authors are Jay MacPherson, Al Purdy, Milton Acorn and Gwendolyn MacEwen. In the epigraph for the chapter "Orientation" Atwood includes five quotations addressing Canadian literature, suggesting the impact of her nationality on her writing.

== Reception ==
Negotiating with the Dead received positive responses from both Canadian and British media. The British publication Telegraph commented "Atwood offers a playful, informed and briskly sensible discussion of the writing life." The Canadian publication Quill and Quire's review of her work also comments on her humor within the work, stating, "Atwood’s style glistens with sharp details and sly wit."

The major critique of this piece of non-fiction is the lack of organization and obvious origins of the work as an oral and not a written form of communication. Atwood herself acknowledges these problems in her introduction. The Telegraph notes, "some of the cosy humor grates much more on the page than it would in a lecture theatre."
