= Harvey Goldman =

American artist (born 1951)

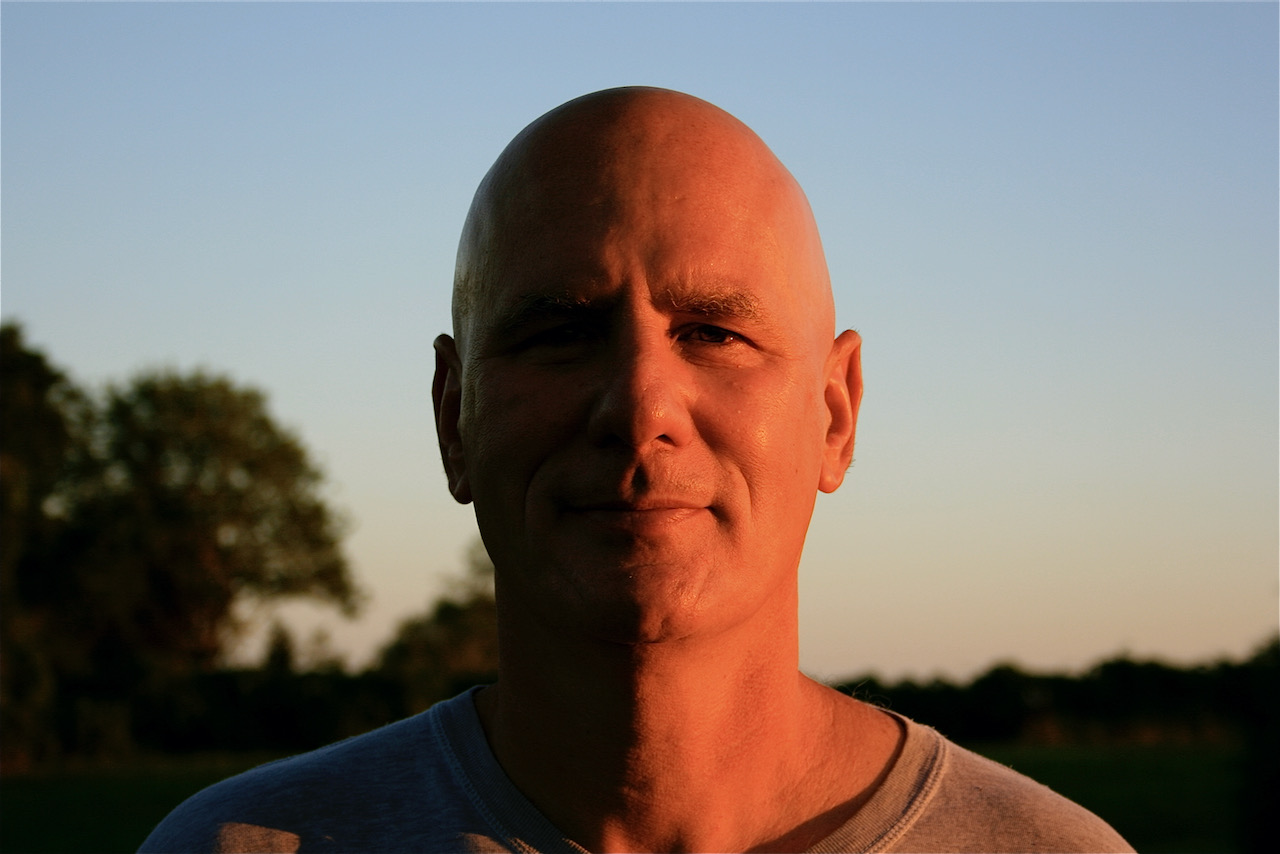
- Born: September 28, 1951 (age 74); Chicago, Illinois
- Occupations: artist, educator, gardner
- Known for: ceramics, digital art, experimental film and visual music

Harvey Goldman (born September 28, 1951) is an American artist and educator.

== Education ==
He received a BFA from the University of Illinois at Urbana–Champaign and a MFA from the University of Massachusetts, Amherst.

== Career ==
Goldman is best known for his work in the fields of ceramics, digital art, experimental film and visual music. Goldman's work is represented among many private and public art collections including the IotaCenter for Experimental Animation, Boston Museum of Fine Arts, Everson Museum of Art, DeCordova Museum and Sculpture Park, Currier Museum of Art, and the Crocker Art Museum. Goldman's work has been exhibited in a wide range of venues throughout the United States as well as Amsterdam, Austria, Australia, Britain, Canada, China, France, Germany, Israel, Italy, Japan, Spain, Romania, Russia, South Africa, and Turkey. He is the recipient of grants from the National Endowment for the Arts (Emerging Craftsman Award), The Ford Foundation and the Massachusetts Council on the Arts and Humanities. Goldman taught at the University of Massachusetts, Dartmouth from 1978-2015.

== Ceramics ==
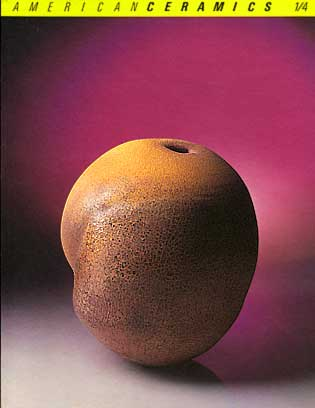
"Wooly Zuff", Ceramic Vessel by Harvey Goldman, 1981

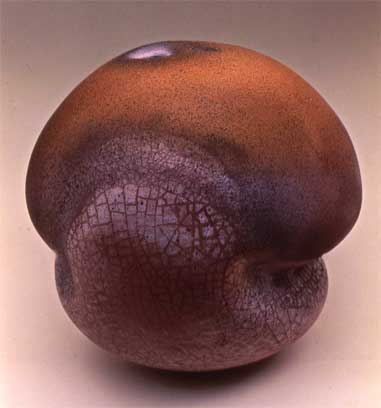
Ceramic Vessel, Harvey Goldman, 1982

Goldman's work in the area of ceramics ranges from approximately 1973–1987.The work is characterized by asymmetrical organic forms and rich multi-fired surfaces that reflect the effects of time and aging. His vessel "Wolley Zuff" was featured in Peter Lanes book Studio Ceramics and on the cover of American Ceramics Magazine. Goldman's ceramic work has been featured in many issues of Ceramics Monthly Magazine He has taught ceramic workshops at both the Penland School of Crafts and the Haystack Mountain School of Crafts. Goldman's ceramic work has been acquired by both public and private collections including the Museum of American Ceramics, Pomona California.

Goldman's work in the area of ceramics ranges from approximately 1973–1987. The work is characterized by asymmetrical organic forms and rich multi-fired surfaces that reflect the effects of time and aging. His vessel "Wolley Zuff" was featured in Peter Lanes book Studio Ceramics and on the cover of American Ceramics Magazine. Goldman's ceramic work has been featured in many issues of Ceramics Monthly Magazine He has taught ceramic workshops at both the Penland School of Crafts and the Haystack Mountain School of Crafts. Goldman's ceramic work has been acquired by both public and private collections including the Museum of American Ceramics, Pomona California.

== Digital Imaging ==
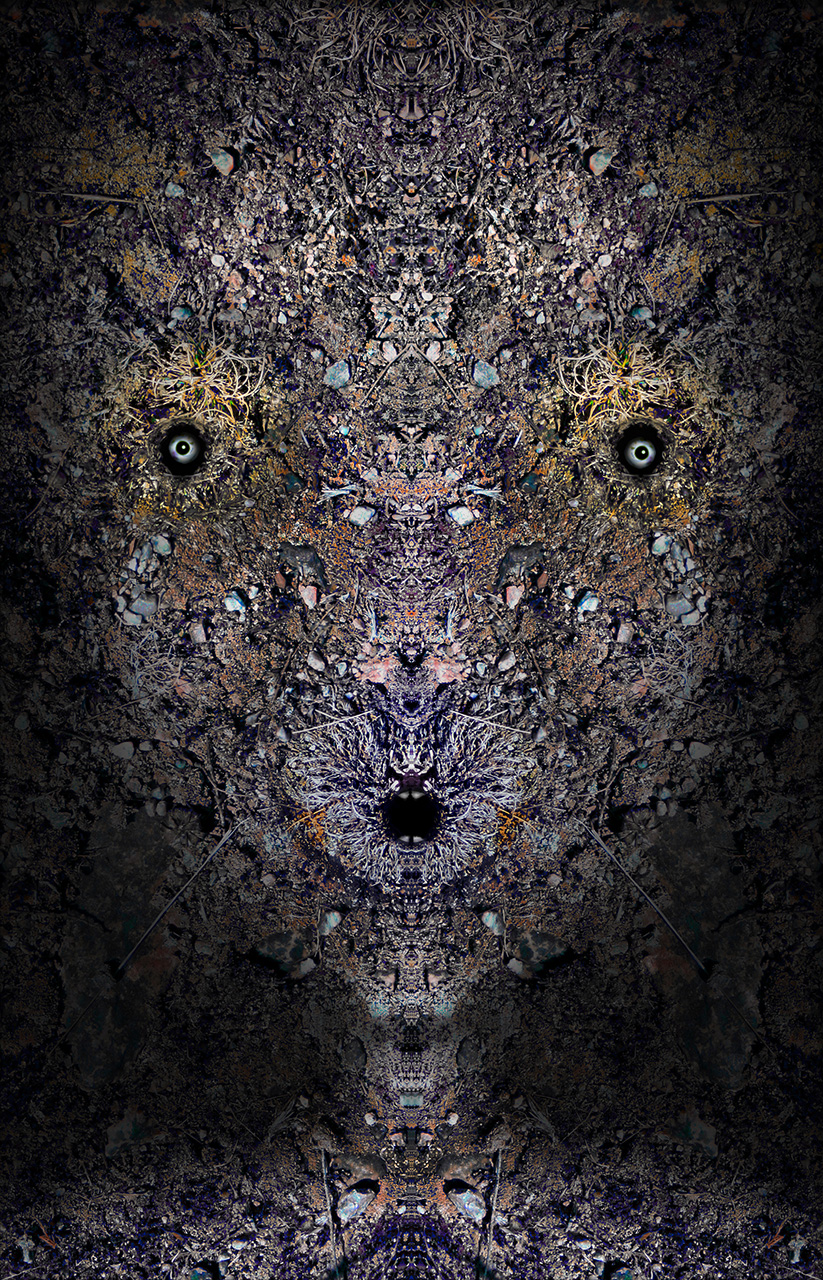
"Terra Vellum", digital print, Veiled Ancestors Series, Harvey Goldman, 2020

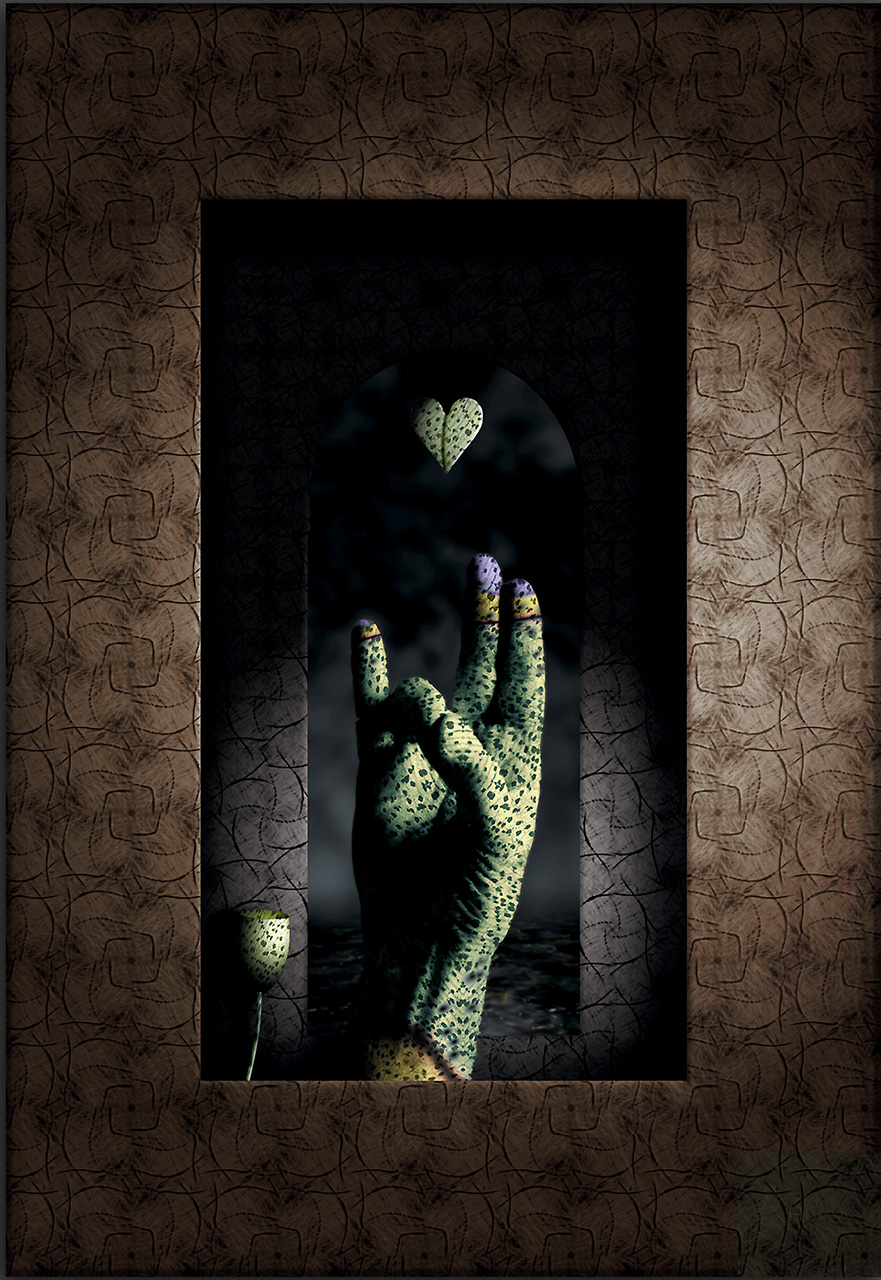
"Courage" digital Print, Harvey Goldman, 2014

Goldman's work in the area of digital imaging can be characterized by a rich use of the color, pattern and texture as well as a multi-layering of photographic elements. Art historian Dr. Thomas Stubblefield, has stated,"Utilizing digital photography to carefully layer graphic elements of the natural world, Goldman’s images blur the boundaries between still and moving images, painting and photography, realism and fantasy. These tensions form the basis of his Veiled Ancestors and Coincidentia Oppositorum series, a body of work that originates from the vast catalogue of photographs that the artist has collected from his daily walks in the woods. In this work the camera is called upon not to suspend or freeze time but to expand its reach, accumulating multiple moments within its frame" and "In his Extremities and Digits series, Goldman interrogates the inner workings of his primary tool, the hand. Despite never actually disclosing the artist himself, the work comprises a self-portrait of sorts. It is a meditation on the mystery of the creative process and the interconnectedness between the artist’s identity and his daily work."

== Experimental animation and visual music ==
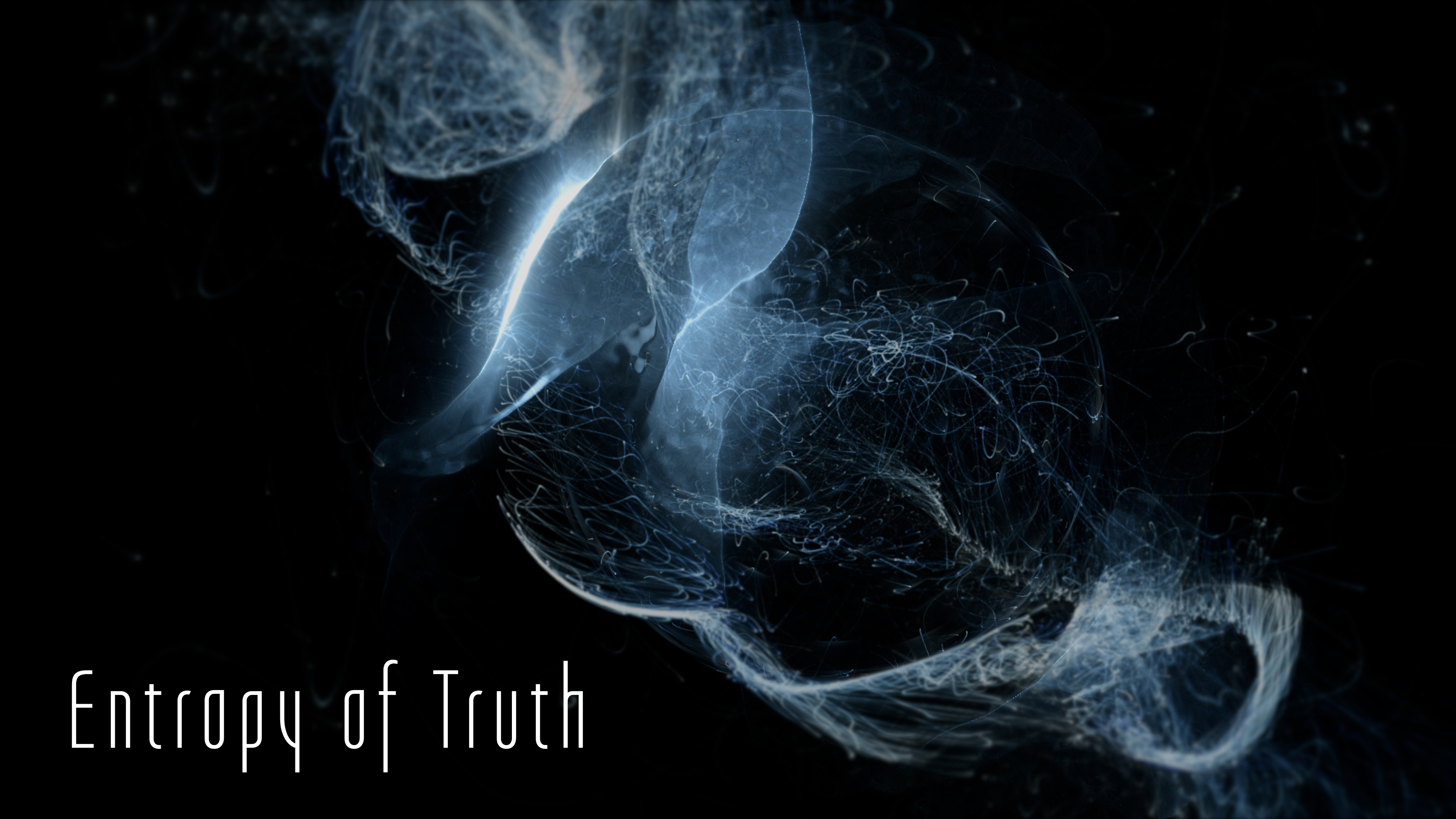
Still from experimental film "Entropy of Truth" Harvey Goldman and Jing Wang, 2023

Goldman's work in the field of animation can be catalogued under the categories of experimental film and visual music. Goldman"s work have been displayed in film festivals worldwide, including, the Smithsonian's Hirshhorn Museum and Sculpture Garden, the Corcoran Gallery of Art the White Box Museum, Beijing, China, Kyoto Museum, Japan and MuVi4, in conjunction with the Fifth International conference; Synaesthesia: Science and Art, Alcalà la Real, Jaèn, Spain. His animation "Sabinium" was created in collaboration with composer Ken Ueno. "Brahmanda", "Enigma" and "Passaddhi" have been created in collaboration with Chinese composer Jing Wang.

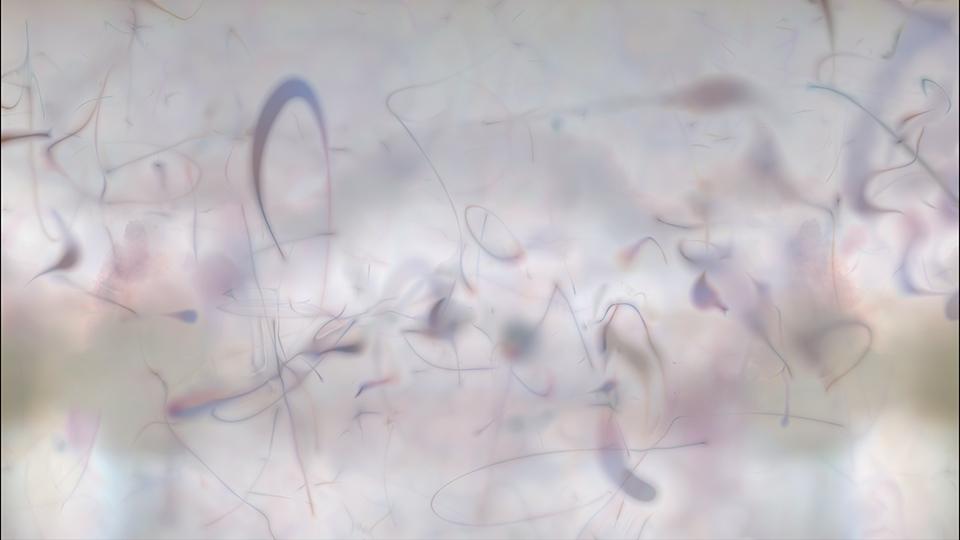
Still from "Passaddi" film 2015

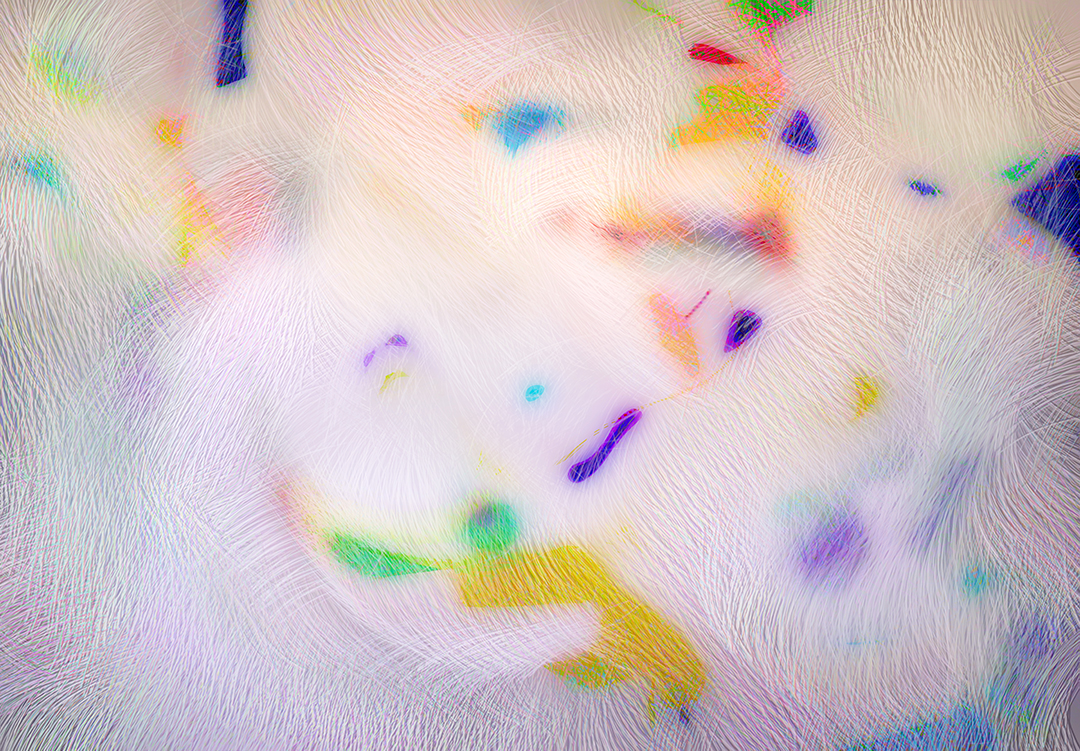
"Tropics 032", digital print, Harvey Goldman, 2016

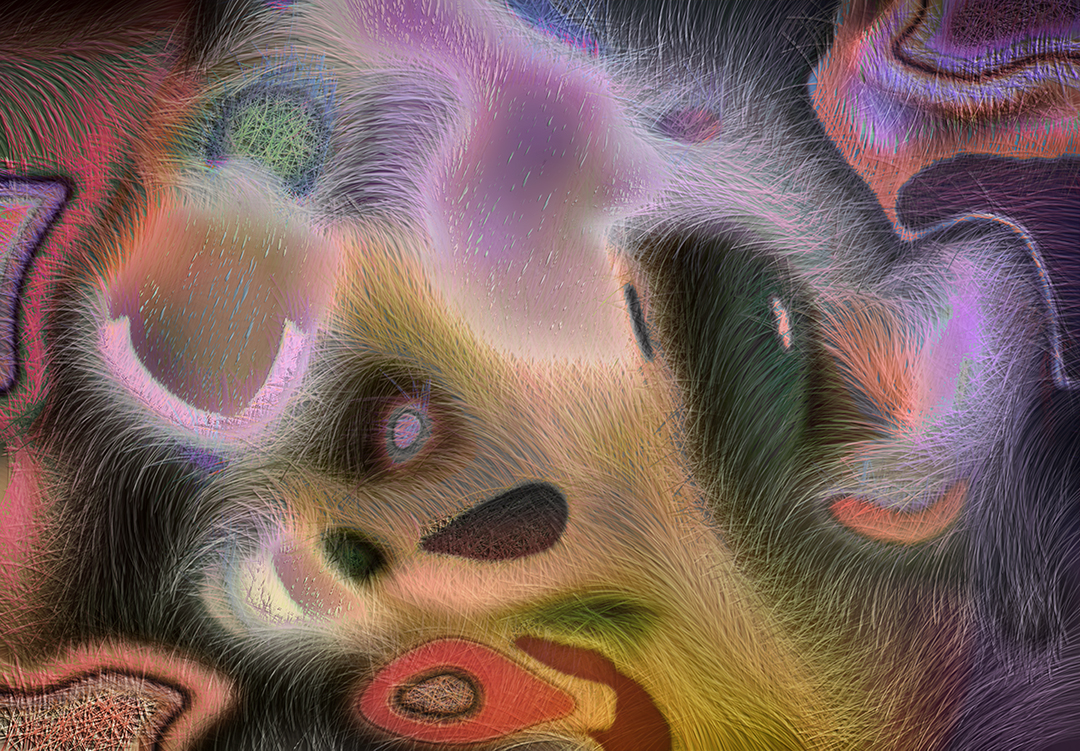
"Tropics 022" digital print, 2016, Harvey Goldman
