= NY Art Book Fair =

Yearly art book fair in New York City

The NY Art Book Fair (NYABF) is Printed Matter, Inc's annual event, held in various months ranging from September, October, or April. The fair is located right around the Printed Matter's bookstore. The NY Art Book Fair is the world's largest book fair for artists’ books and related publications, featuring over 370 exhibitors from 30 countries, and attended by over 39,000 visitors annually. Originally free, the now ticketed fair presents an active program of exhibitions, talks, workshops, book launches and performances, as well as many off-schedule events hosted by individual publishers.

The NY Art Book Fair was created under the direction of AA Bronson, a New York artist and former President of Printed Matter, Inc. (2004-2010). It was held at MoMA PS1 in Long Island City, New York from 2009 to 2019. In 2012, over 25,000 people attended the event. In 2013, the attendance rose to 27,000. From 2013 to 2017, the NY Art Book Fair was run and curated by Printed Matter's Shannon Michael Cane and artist Jordan Nassar, until Cane's death in November 2017.

Beginning in 2018, Printed Matter's Art Book Fairs, which includes the NY Art Book Fair, LA Art Book Fair, and Printed Matter's Virtual Art Book Fair (PMVABF), have been under the direction of Sonel Breslav who organized the fair with artist and curator Emmy Catedral between 2018 and 2021, and currently with Sanjana Iyer.

Printed Matter's NY Art Book Fair hosts over nearly 300 independent presses, zines, booksellers, antiquarian dealers, artists and publishers from over twenty countries, in addition to featuring special programming, such as the Contemporary Artists' Books Conference, The Classroom, and special exhibitions.
