= Jenkins Group =

American book publishing and marketing company

- Founded: 1988; 38 years ago (as Publisher's Design Service and Publisher's Distribution Service)
- Founder: Jerrold Jenkins
- Headquarters: Traverse City, Michigan, US
- Key people: Jerrold Jenkins (chairman & CEO); Leah Nicholson (book production manager); Yvonne Fetig Roehler (creative director); James Kalajian (COO)
- Website: jenkinsgroupinc.com

Jenkins Group, Inc. is a book publishing and marketing company based in Traverse City, Michigan, USA. It was established in 1988 as Publisher's Design Service and Publisher's Distribution Service, then was incorporated as Jenkins Group in 1995. It provides custom book publishing and marketing services and has founded several book awards programs.

== Awards programs ==
=== Independent Publisher Book Awards ===
A contest created in 1996 and nicknamed the "IPPY" Awards, this program is open to independently published titles written in English. According to its website, the awards seek to "reward those who exhibit the courage, innovation, and creativity to bring about change in the world of publishing." Entrants can choose from 88 general awards categories as well as e-book categories and regional categories in North America, Europe, and Oceania.

=== Moonbeam Children's Book Awards ===
This award was founded in 2006 and with its 40+ categories aims to recognize children's books that may otherwise have been overlooked by larger, more general contests. Since 2010, the awards ceremony has been held as part of the Traverse City Children's Book Festival.

=== Axiom Business Book Awards ===
Established in 2007, this program targets new and innovative works in the business world across 23 categories.

=== Living Now Book Awards ===
Living Now medals have been awarded to "lifestyle, homestyle, world-improvement and self-improvement" books since 2008, with a new digital media category introduced in 2021. In 2016, they also introduced the Evergreen Book Medals for titles created in the new millennium that contribute to "positive global change".

=== eLit Book Awards ===
This contest began in 2009 and awards 66 categories of electronic publishing. It includes not only books, but also publications such as author websites and book trailers.

=== Illumination Book Awards ===
The newest of Jenkins Group's award programs, Illumination was started in 2013 to recognize leading authors in Christian publishing.

=== Criticism ===
The awards established by Jenkins Group were criticized by Writer Beware, an advocacy blog sponsored by the Science Fiction and Fantasy Writers of America, listing them among others that purportedly benefit the organizer more than the winners and noting that "even among profiteers, however, Jenkins is unusual in the amount of extra merchandise it hawks to winners." The Alliance of Independent Authors also gave all six Jenkins awards its worst rating, reserved for "contests with more serious concerns". Notes for some of the contests included "relentless marketing and upselling" and "the site's FAQ notes that judges may not even read the books".

== Podcasts ==
=== Concept to Cover ===
Established in 2023, Concept to Cover is a podcast hosted by Leah Nicholson that features editors, writers, and ghostwriters, and more leaders in the book industry.

=== Behind The Cover ===
Established in 2023, Behind The Cover is a podcast hosted by Amy Shamroe that features award-winning authors and a look behind the scenes with those in the book industry.
