= Black Male: Representations of Masculinity in Contemporary American Art =

American art exhibition

Black Male: Representations of Masculinity in Contemporary Art was a landmark exhibition held at New York's Whitney Museum of American Art from November 10, 1994 until March 5, 1995. Organized by curator Thelma Golden, Black Male was a survey of the changing representations of black masculinity in contemporary art from the 1970s to the 1990s. The show included almost seventy works by twenty-nine artists of varying race, gender, and ethnicity. It also featured an extensive film and video program that explored representations of blackness in Hollywood, the independent cinema, video, and television. Black Male was widely labelled controversial and heavily criticized for its "political" subject matter.

== Overview ==
Black Male featured works that varied in their methods of engagement with stereotypes and falsities of black masculinity that have saturated popular culture for centuries. The exhibition illustrated the tradition of stereotype and caricature, widely encountered in both high and popular art but most widely visible in the production of mass culture that has characterized the representation of black masculinity in modern times. Art historian Huey Copeland stated that ... "the exhibition was not about offering a mirror or image of black masculinity, but providing a context to comprehend how a black male might be produced visually, and the many ways that one might work through that visual production."

According to Golden, ... "the impetus for the exhibition was the goal of creating a new model for understanding the complex aesthetics and politics at work in representations of African American men in the post-Civil Rights era." As a curator at the Whitney Museum, Golden was struck by institutional attitudes and exhibition making that excluded—or only very narrowly included—the work of black artists. The curator described feeling as if "a new language had to be invented" in order to interrogate the idea of cultural specificity in the museum, especially in relation to blackness. Golden cites one of the central guiding questions for the exhibition as "what would happen if I made an exhibition that completely lived in a world of Black—with a big B—art and artists: uncompromised, unapologetic, uninterested in the mainstream art world?" She drew from Lowery Stokes Sims' idea of "curatorial archaeology" --- curatorial representation of artists historically excluded from mainstream art exhibitions --- to establish a precedent for thinking about black artists and their work through a conceptual lens, and offer a path to canon revision.

On December 12, 2014, the Education department at the Whitney Museum presented Looking Back at Black Male, a public program to mark the twentieth anniversary of the exhibition. The event featured curator Thelma Golden in conversation with writer Hilton Als, who edited the exhibition catalogue, and Huey Copeland, art historian and critic, to discuss the exhibition and its impact on the contemporary art scene.

== Works ==
The exhibition features work across a variety of mediums, including photography, sculpture, drawing, painting, and video art. Among the works in the exhibition are:

- Fred Wilson's Guarded View (1991)—four headless, black mannequins dressed in typical museum guard attire.
- The video art piece Rodney King, Police Beating (1992) by Danny Tisdale, comprising nine still frames from the viral video that captured the police beating of Los Angeles resident, Rodney King Jr., a black man whose abusers were exonerated in a Simi Valley courtroom.
- Some of the Greatest Hits of the New York City Police Department: A Celebration of Meritorious Achievement in Community Service (1994) by Carl Pope, which consisted of a collection of trophies commemorating the homicides of black men in encounters with the New York City police.
- Marlon Riggs' 1989 documentary Tongues Untied.
- Leon Golub's paintings, including Four Black Men (1985).
- Barkley L. Hendricks' portrait painting Tuff Tony (1978).

== Participating artists ==
Exhibited artists included:

- Robert Arneson
- Jean-Michel Basquiat
- Nayland Blake
- Mel Chin
- Robert Colescott
- Renee Cox
- Dawn Ader DeDeaux
- Kevin Everson
- Leon Golub
- David Hammons
- Lyle Ashton Harris
- Barkley L. Hendricks
- Byron Kim
- Jeff Koons
- Glenn Ligon
- Robert Mapplethorpe
- Adrian Piper
- Carl Pope
- Tim Rollins + K.O.S.
- Alison Saar
- Andres Serrano
- Gary Simmons
- Lorna Simpson
- Danny Tisdale
- Christian Walker
- Carrie Mae Weems
- Pat Ward Williams
- Fred Wilson
- X-PRZ

== Reception ==
Black Male was met with mixed, predominantly negative reviews. New York Times reviewer Michael Kimmelman wrote, "The result? 'Black Male' will almost certainly be remembered for the debates it provokes, which may be considerable and important. The Whitney is proud of the breadth of issues it tackles, and not altogether wrongly so. It's paradoxical, then, that with 'Black Male,' it succumbs to such chic and narrow thinking."

Black Male traveled to the Hammer Museum in Los Angeles after its opening show at the Whitney. The exhibition at the Hammer Museum included a comment book in which visitors could express their responses to the show; a total of five spiral-bound notebooks were filled during the run of the exhibition.
