= Nick Gentry =

British artist from London (born 1980)

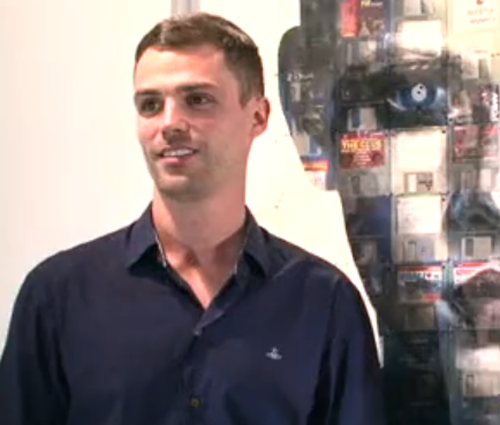
- Nick Gentry, at the Collective Memory exhibition in Miami
- Born: 29 May 1980 (age 46); London, England, UK
- Education: Central St Martins College of Art and Design
- Known for: Painting, Collage, Found Object, Social Art, Environmentalism
- Notable work: Design of Desire, Digital Montage Number 3, BIOS

Nicholas James Gentry (born 29 May 1980) is a British artist from London. Much of his artistic output has been generated with the use of contributed artefacts and materials. He states that through this process "contributor, artist and viewer come closer together". His art is influenced by the development of consumerism, technology, identity and cyberculture in society, with a distinctive focus on obsolete media.

Drawing on recycled and obsolete technological materials as the grounds for his paintings, London-based artist Nick Gentry creates a conversation between digital and analog processes. Gentry constructs his painting supports out of materials such as film negatives, VHS cassettes, X-rays, and floppy disks. "These objects are no longer in the spotlight," the artist has said of floppy disks, "but by placing them there for a second it becomes easier to comprehend the speed and extent of the changes that are taking place today." Gentry often incorporates elements of these materials into his figures. The magnetic circles of floppy disks, for example, often serve as eyes in his portraits. He tries to avoid identifying age, gender and race and said his portraits are 'like a void to be filled' which enable people to bring their own identities to his work.

Such artistic works of social commentary have been featured in galleries in the UK, USA and in cities throughout the world. His work has been exhibited alongside established contemporary Young British Artists Mark Quinn, Damien Hirst, and Tracey Emin and also with notable street artists, such as Banksy, Shepard Fairey and Blek le Rat. As a result, he has been linked with both the Contemporary art and Urban art scenes in London.

== Early life ==
Nick Gentry was born in Hampstead, London and grew up in the nearby market city of St Albans. He spent much of his childhood drawing and sketching. He attended Parmiter's School in Garston, Hertfordshire. He continued to study art at Ridge Street Art School and the University of Hertfordshire. During this time he was inspired by a visit to the exhibition Sensation at the Royal Academy of Art, signalling the arrival of the Young British Artists. He was later refused admission to Liverpool College of Art when he first applied, but attended the college after a subsequent application a year later. From there he progressed to graduate from Central Saint Martins in London in 2006.

== Works ==
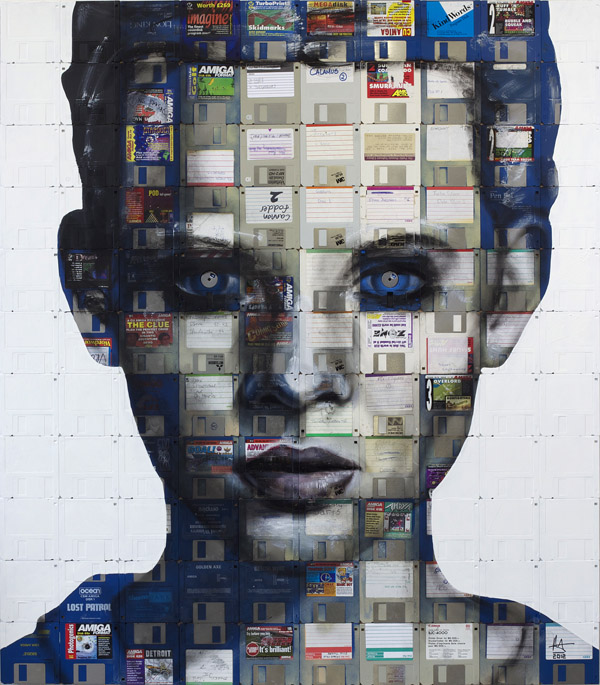
Nick Gentry Digital Montage Number 2.

=== Film Negative and X-ray Artworks ===
A series of portraits created from used film negatives and X-rays which have been contributed by members of the public. The negative selection process is based on tone and by layering the film he creates the contrast and shape of the faces. Gentry has also used X-rays for the darker tones, noticeably in the hair section of the images which are back lit with LED. The use of these materials alludes to a collective identity that can be viewed from both emotional and biological perspectives. He observes that "today we go to great lengths to create a digital identity in addition to the actual lives we live, with the belief that these online records are only growing in importance and will outlive us".

=== Floppy Disk Paintings ===
A series of Generation X portraits on supports made from used computer disks, whose metal hub serves as the subject's profoundly un-humanlike eye. Adding to his haunting renderings are the handwritten labels, along with the disks' original blue, black, or grey colour contributing to the composite form. The disks are sourced entirely from public donation and this series represents Gentry's first foray into what has been described as 'social art'.

=== VHS Tape Paintings ===
In a body of assemblage paintings for the exhibition "Skin Deep," the London-based artist used crowd-sourced VHS tapes for his realistic portraits of cyborg sensations. Offspring of Metropolis (1927 film) and Ex Machina (film), Gentry’s wide-eyed people, who wear informational histories on their skins, tell us as much about the future as they do about the past.

=== Sculptures and Public Displays ===
From 29 June until 6 September 2015 a commissioned sculpture by Gentry was publicly displayed in the Barbican Centre in London. Inspired by the Nucleic acid double helix form, a series of 21 giant sculptures were customised by artists and designers including Ai Weiwei and Zaha Hadid. The sculptures were auctioned at Christie's on 30 September 2015 to raise funds for Cancer Research UK and to help complete the construction of the Francis Crick Institute, a new biomedical research facility at London’s King’s Cross.

In the summer of 2018, Gentry created a rhino sculpture as part of the Tusk Rhino Trail. The project aimed to draw attention to the severe threat of poaching to the rhino. Each of the 21 rhinos were customised by artists such as Jonathan Yeo, David Mach and Marc Quinn. The works of art were put on public display at iconic London sites before being auctioned by Christie’s, raising funds for Tusk Trust conservation projects protecting rhino and other African species.

On World Lion Day 2021 Gentry's customised life-sized lion sculpture 'Wild Roots' went on public display, alongside another lion by Gavin Turk in London's Trafalgar Square. A total of 45 sculptures across the world formed part of a fundraising campaign for conservation charity Tusk Trust.

=== Collaborations ===
In June 2017 Gentry was one of six international artists invited to participate in a collaboration with World Wide Fund for Nature and Tiger Beer in an effort to highlight the harmful effects of illegal tiger trade, a cause of the shrinking tiger population. Gentry visited the Mondulkiri Protected Forest in Cambodia in search of wild tigers, but thanks to poaching, there has been no sighting of tigers for the past decade. Instead, he only saw animal snares. "It’s 8,000 sq km of forest and it was once perfect for tigers, there are more (tigers) in captivity than in the wild now." recalled Gentry. Supporters uploaded selfies, then created and shared AI-generated artworks using one of the six artists' tiger-themed artworks. The images symbolise pledgers' collective fight against illegal tiger trade. The physical artworks were displayed at Clarke Quay Singapore and the interactive showcase travelled to various cities worldwide.

In 2021 Gentry added to his longstanding WWF collaborations with a series of portraits titled 'Protectors of the Amazon'. The images depicted faces of Brazil's indigenous people, overlaid with images of devastation of the Amazon rainforest. Gentry states that through the work he "wanted to show that there is ancient wisdom and resilience in both the people and the land, but also a ghostly vulnerability. More than ever, we need to stand with the Amazon’s people and listen to their knowledge and wisdom."

=== Street Artworks ===
Little is known about the street activity of Gentry. In earlier years before gallery representation the artist would often leave paintings in the streets for passers-by to pick up as gifts. This 'free art' practice draws comparison to the early activity of fellow London-based artist Adam Neate.

== Career ==
In 2010 Gentry's first show took place in a small studio space in Soho, London at Studio55 Gallery. The show was titled Auto-Emotion and consisted of a series of floppy disk portraits. At the end of the year, Gentry took up a two-month art residency at Pantocrator Gallery in Barcelona, Spain. The residency culminated in a solo exhibition and live performance by Petra Flurr and Lola Von Dage.

In 2011 Gentry had his first solo exhibition in the US at Robert Fontaine Gallery in Miami. Later that year Gentry had a solo exhibition at Whisper Gallery in London, titled Dataface. Selfridges featured a pop-up show of Gentry's works, titled Artefacts. Members of the public were invited to donate their obsolete technology to contribute to future artworks by the artist.

In 2012 Gentry took part in a large scale urban art group show titled Urban Masters, in an East London warehouse. This was followed by a second solo show at Robert Fontaine Gallery titled Collective Memory.

In 2013 a group show titled The Many Faces of David Bowie took place at Opera Gallery in London, UK. Gentry created a replica of Bowie's red Fender guitar using original film negatives of David Bowie, although it remains unknown if the negatives were contributed by Bowie himself. This was followed by a third solo exhibition at Robert Fontaine Gallery in Miami. The show was titled X-Change, heavily featuring the film negative and X-ray works for the first time.

In 2014 Gentry appeared in the BBC Two documentary Making Art Work. Sitting in his studio surrounded by his artwork, Gentry explains how he re-uses outdated technology to create his artwork. He references inspiration by Marcel Duchamp and old footage of Duchamp’s work of a urinal is shown. He explains that Duchamp placed this object in a gallery and called it art, therefore artists should not be restricted by materials such as canvas but feel free to re-use materials. In November Gentry had a fourth solo exhibition at Robert Fontaine Gallery titled Synthetic Daydreams which consisted of works using 35mm film negatives. Gentry also took part in his first group show in New York at C24 Gallery. The show was titled YELL-O and also featured the work of Hellbent (J. Mikal Davis), Adele Mills and Ekaterina Panikanova. Gentry's work featured for the first time in Hong Kong at the group exhibition Urban Renewal at Opera Gallery alongside artists Seo Young-Deok, Olivier Dassault and Yves Krief.

In April 2015 Gentry had his first solo exhibition in Knokke, Belgium at Absolute Art Gallery. The show was titled Memoryscapes and featured a series of the lightbox film negative works.

In the summer of 2016, Gentry had his debut New York solo show at C24 Gallery. The exhibit, which marked his debut with the gallery, explored human connectedness, remembrance and nostalgia within the unrelenting, digitally oversaturated world of the present. The works, which mostly feature ethereal humanlike subjects, are constructed from sourced materials made by donors from around the globe that piece together a psychologically compelling narrative of human solidarity. In November and December Gentry's work was exhibited alongside a selection of rare works by Young British Artists Mark Quinn, Damien Hirst, and Tracey Emin at Opera Gallery in London. The show, titled 'BritARTnia' also presented the work of internationally established artists such as Julian Opie of the New British Sculpture movement; celebrity photographer and recipient of the Royal Photographic Society's Centenary medal Terry O'Neill (photographer) and Royal Academician and Turner Prize nominee sculptor David Mach.

September 2018 saw Gentry exhibit 15 new works at Opera Gallery in London alongside South Korean sculptor Seo Young Deok in a joint show titled Human Connection. Gentry used a combination of outdated media including crushed data CDs, floppy disks and film negatives to "communicate the feeling of time passing, which is a really difficult thing to describe" with words alone.

A solo show titled 'Face of London' was held at Opera Gallery in April 2019. Gentry launched his new project at the exhibition, taking photos of visitors to the show, which were then used to create modern-day selfie inspired portraits on vinyl LP record sleeves – another discarded piece of kit that he transformed into artistic data-rich time capsules of modern social history. Later that year Gentry continued to experiment with using record sleeves in his large scale montage portraits at his first solo show in Paris at Opera Gallery in the exhibition 'ID Merge'.

During lockdown in the spring of 2020, Gentry undertook at project to communicate the experiences of front line health care staff dealing with the COVID-19 pandemic. This new series of portraits used computer punched card from the 1960s and 1970s to tell the stories of frontline National Health Service workers.

Gentry returned to Robert Fontaine Gallery in 2023 for the 15th solo show of his career. The show was titled 'Skin Deep' and featured a series of technological portraits, broaching the artificiality of online identities. The artist invited questions that are uniquely contemporary, asking about performance and presentation on the internet, increasingly artificial standards of beauty, and the instability of memory over time.

== Publications ==
=== Books by Nick Gentry ===
- Skin Deep by Nick Gentry, 2023
- U by Nick Gentry, 2021
- Lifelike by Federica Beretta and Nick Gentry, 2018
- Psychic Compound by Paul Laster and Nick Gentry, 2016
- Synthetic Daydreams by Nick Gentry, 2014
- Collective Memory by Nick Gentry, 2013
- Artefacts by Nick Gentry, 2011
- Obsolete by Nick Gentry, 2010

=== Books featuring Nick Gentry ===
- Floppy Disk Fever, Onomatopee, 2022
- The Collage Ideas Book, Ilex Press, 2018
- Artaq 2011, Editions Suty, 2011
