= C24 Gallery =

Art gallery in Manhattan, New York

Coordinates: 40.74859°N 74.00479°W

C24 Gallery is a contemporary art gallery located on West 24th Street in Chelsea, Manhattan, New York City. The gallery was founded in 2011 by Emre and Maide Kurttepeli, together with Mel Dogan, and is currently owned by the founding partners.

C24 Gallery presents solo and group exhibitions of both local and international artists. In addition to its exhibition program, which includes collaborations with cultural institutions such as the Consulate Generals of Germany and South Africa, the ING Discerning Eye Exhibition, Goethe-Institut, Soho House, the German Academic Exchange Service, Galerie Deschler Berlin, A:D: Curatorial, Artis, Elizabeth Foundation for the Arts, and Field Projects, C24 Gallery regularly hosts panel discussions, performances and other events, and participates in major art fairs globally. With its increasingly diverse program, the gallery is focusing on more underrepresented artists and voices from a wide variety of communities.

== Artists ==
Artists exhibited by C24 Gallery are also featured in museum exhibitions and biennials, and are included in leading institutional collections. Artists represented by C24 Gallery are Gabriel Barcia-Colombo, Marion Fink, Coby Kennedy, Cal Lane, Eleen Lin, Cheryl Molnar, Ryan Sarah Murphy, İrfan Önürmen, Viktor Popović, Tammie Rubin, Roxa Smith, Brendan Lee Satish Tang, Marie Tomanova, and Christian Vincent.

In addition to the artists they represent, C24 Gallery has organized exhibitions featuring works by local and internationally based artists including Jane Corrigan, Mike Dargas, Liana Fink, Karen Finley, Skylar Fein, Nilbar Güreş, Tommy Hartung, Dil Hildebrand, Deborah Kass, Jane Kaplowitz, Ali Kazma, Pixy Liao, Katja Loher, Sven Marquardt, Adele Mills, Ekaterina Panikanova, Seçkin Pirim, Carl Pope, Brian Tolle, and Domingo Zapata.

== Exhibitions ==
David C. Terry served as Director and Curator of the gallery from 2019 to 2025. His extensive experience in the arts played a key role in shaping the gallery’s reputation for presenting critical and socially engaged work. C24 Gallery's first exhibition, Double Crescent: Art From Istanbul And New Orleans, was curated by Dan Cameron, one-time director of the Istanbul Biennial and former senior curator of the New Museum. According to Cameron, the show's goal was to "examine the art of two great port cities that have channeled European culture into unexpected colors and shapes." The show featured the work of New Orleans art collective Generic Art Solutions and Turkish artists Hale Tenger and Ali Kazma.

Additional exhibitions at C24 Gallery include Split Archives, a solo exhibition of work by Viktor Popovic; Transfigured with artists Jaishri Abichandani, Gabriel Barcia-Colombo, Andrea Dezso, and Sophie Kahn; Bust-Head; Word Up! co-curated with Sharon Louden, including work by Liana Fink, Karen Finley, Deborah Kass, Carl Pope, and other artists who incorporate text and written language in their artwork; Pool Party co-curated with Field Projects; Culture Keepers; Analogous Dimensions co-curated with AD: Curatorial; You Belong Here, a two-person show featuring Orit Ben Shitrit and Nirit Takele; The Seventh View, featuring selections from the ING Discerning Eye Exhibition; On the Inside: Portraiture Through Photography with artists Lisa Crafts, Laura Heyman, Pixy Liao, Sven Marquardt, and Marie Tomanova; Sites Unseen, a solo exhibition of collage-paintings by Cheryl Molnar; and Earthen Delights with works by Hinrich Kroger, Steven Montgomery, and Brendan Lee Satish Tang. Cal Lane and Roxa Smith’s two person exhibition, titled In Her Space was on view from January 13 through March 11, 2022.

Mythodical (March 17 to May 4, 2022) featured paintings by Eleen Lin and ceramics by Tammie Rubin. The work received praise from arts writers Charity Coleman in Artforum and Madison Ford in the Brooklyn Rail.

Gallery artist Irfan Önürmen’s fifth solo show, titled Everyday Heroes, which ran from May 12 to July 9, 2022, was distinct in its combination of traditional and digital artworks. Önürmen displayed a series of fifteen new monochromatic tulle wall hangings, as well as a series of NFTs based on traditional materials-based art, which he calls "NFTulle: Origins". The NFTs are 150 distinct digital works, which observe and reflect upon contemporary society through its complex system of codes and symbols.

From July 21 through Friday, September 23, 2022, C24 displayed a solo exhibition titled Structural Integrity, featuring reclaimed cardboard relief sculptures, by Ryan Sarah Murphy. Structural Integrity featured a group of landscapes resembling topographic maps, or cross sections of architectural buildings, each created through a meticulous process of transforming discarded pieces of cardboard that she finds throughout the streets of New York City.

From October 8 to December 23, 2022, the gallery collaborated with the German Consulate General in New York to present two solo shows, Expanding Orbits and Stageless: Second Act. Expanding Orbits featured monoprint portraits by C24 Gallery artist Marion Fink, while Stageless: Second Act exhibited photographic portraits by Sven Marquardt.

For their first show of 2023, the gallery presented paintings by Nigerian-born artist Abi Salami and Zimbabwe-born, Cape Town-based artist Micha Serraf. The exhibition was titled Impossible Things. The subsequent exhibition, No Vacancy, featured gallery artist Roxa Smith’s colorful paintings and collages inspired the interior spaces and furnishings from familial and cultural history.

Rites of Passage, which opened in May 2023, features gallery artists Cheryl Molnar and Christian Vincent. Both artists' work present narratives that address family dynamics, lived experiences, and personal milestones. Molnar's work incorporates photographic and digitally rendered images with painted elements. The paintings represent eastern Long Island topography merged with recognizable features of the mountains and deserts of southern California, as a means to reflect on her time growing up between the east and west coast. Vincent's large oil paintings are described as an "ode to blissful summer...where characters abandon themselves to their surroundings in several seaside landscapes of adventure." Simultaneously on view in the gallery's lower floor atrium is a solo exhibition titled Thinking of You by Turkish artist Fırat Neziroğlu, which features portraits that re-imagine Western mythology through a queer lens.

== Art fairs ==
In addition to their gallery exhibitions, C24 Gallery has displayed work by their artists in major international art fairs including the Armory Show, Art Miami, Art on Paper, Cape Town Art Fair, Contemporary Istanbul, and VOLTA.

At the VOLTA art fair in 2018, the gallery presented R.U.R. (Rossum’s Universal Robots), a mixed-media installation by Tommy Hartung which tells a dystopian, science-fiction narrative about a cheap workforce of manufactured humanoids who murder their human creators

At the 2020 Armory Show in New York, they organized an exhibition of works by Viktor Popović, which juxtapose archival images of the Croatian Coast prior to the Croatian War of Independence with contemporary photographs revealing the social, cultural, and economic effects of war.

In February 2023, C24 Gallery participated in the Investec Cape Town Art Fair in South Africa. They presented a booth featuring Zimbabwe born artist Micha Serraf. Serraf was awarded Honorable Mention for the Best Booth Award in the Tomorrows/Today section.
