= Yeast culture =

Yeast culture might refer to:

- A cultivated growth of the yeast organism
- Yeast Culture (company), a British film and digital media production company
- A yeast starter culture used in winemaking

== See also ==
- National Collection of Yeast Cultures
