= Dawn DeDeaux =

American visual artist

- Born: 1952 (age 73–74); New Orleans, Louisiana United States
- Education: Louisiana State University, University of Colorado, Newcomb College, Loyola University New Orleans
- Known for: Installation art, sculpture, photography, video, drawing, multimedia
- Awards: National Endowment for the Arts, Joan Mitchell Foundation, Robert Rauschenberg Foundation, American Academy in Rome,
- Website: Dawn DeDeaux

Dawn DeDeaux, Gulf to Galaxy, floor installation, two tons of shattered glass, first created in 2006; recreated for Transart Foundation for Art and Anthropology, 2021 (shown, two views).

Dawn DeDeaux (born 1952) is an American visual artist based in New Orleans, Louisiana whose practice has included installation art, sculpture, photography, technology and multimedia works. Since the 1970s, her work has examined social, political and environmental issues encountered at both the global and local level of her native Louisiana. In 2014, American Theatre wrote that she created "immersive, future-tense" work at the intersection of visual arts, electronically driven theatre and site-specific installation, with sculpture, drawings and digital technology "inspired by ancient myths, mathematical forecasts, symbols, visions of apocalyptic landscapes and utopian longings."

DeDeaux's work has been exhibited at the Whitney Museum of American Art, MASS MoCA, Hammer Museum, Aldrich Museum of Contemporary Art, New Orleans Museum of Art (NOMA), and Ballroom Marfa, among other venues. In 1996, she was one of eight artists selected to represent the American south at the Summer Olympics in Atlanta. She has received awards from the National Endowment for the Arts, Joan Mitchell Foundation, Robert Rauschenberg Foundation and American Academy in Rome, among other institutions.

== Life and career ==
DeDeaux was born in New Orleans in 1952, the eldest of six children. As a child, she lost two siblings to disease and from the age of eleven was raised by her grandmother, Hilda Warfield, on Esplanade Avenue next door to the Degas House. She learned to paint as a teen from a young New York painter, Laura Adams, who rented a room at her grandmother's house for three years. Between 1970 and 1973, DeDeaux studied art at Louisiana State University, University of Colorado and Newcomb College, followed by mass communications studies at Loyola University New Orleans (1975–6).

In the latter 1970s, DeDeaux turned from painting to socially oriented installations and street works that traveled New Orleans' communication systems and underserved communities, inspired in part by media theorist Marshall McLuhan’s concept of the global village. In 1976, she was part of the group of artists that founded the city's Contemporary Arts Center (CAC) and she started NOMA's Arts Quarterly publication, serving as editor for eight years. That same year, she also won the demolition derby held at the Louisiana Superdome, the only female contestant in a field of 35 drivers. In the 1980s, she established and directed a comprehensive arts program for a 6,000-inmate facility in Orleans Parish and began producing large-scale installations and immersive, synchronized media environments related to that work. These projects attracted wider attention, through exhibitions at the Whitney and Hammer museums, the Olympics, and CAC, among others.

Beginning in the latter 1990s, DeDeaux turned to environmental concerns linked to social justice in installations and multimedia works. In 1997, she purchased two small shotgun houses, one to live in and one a digital studio she named the "Art Shack"; New Orleans art critic D. Eric Bookhardt likened the latter to a "manic Louise Nevelson, with a texture like something a Creole Anselm Kiefer might have concocted… a sculpture posing as a house." In 2005, Hurricane Katrina collapsed the roofs of both homes; a year later a fire burned down a larger studio, destroying a third of her work. In response to these disasters, DeDeaux began making work out of the debris and with a more apocalyptic theme in exhibitions at the Blanton Museum of Art, CAC, NOMA, and New Orleans' Prospect international art biennials, among others.

== Work and reception ==
Throughout her career, DeDeaux has merged art with new technologies—electronic, digital and multimedia—seeking to reach wider audiences with work addressing class, race, justice and environmental issues. Her key themes include the frailty and impermanence of people and place, the interconnectedness of all people as well as other planetary life systems, and survival in the face of adversity. Despite her sociopolitical, often Cassandra-like focus, her work is regarded as hopeful and empathetic rather than didactic.

=== Early work ===
DeDeaux employed new media and democratic communication forms in her early work, seeking to encourage a sense of shared struggle across the racial and class divides she witnessed in New Orleans. For CB Radio Booths (1975–6), she installed CB radios in nine gutted outdoor telephone stands to create a pre-internet form of social media—a free, designated communication network linking random strangers across south Louisiana in anonymous conversations.

In the late 1980s and early 1990s, she produced portraits, installations and videos that developed out of her arts program in a local prison and the relationships she formed there. In works such as the installation America House (1989–90) and the guerrilla/documentary style videos Drive By Shooting and The Hardy Boys & Nancy Drew, she sought to give voice to the experiences of marginalized communities and the incarcerated.

The controversial traveling show Soul Shadows: Urban Warrior Myths (Contemporary Museum Baltimore, CCA, Los Angeles Photography Center, 1993) examined young African-American males within a catacomb-like, media-intensive "Sensurround"-like installation. The work featured a hallway indebted to Rodin's The Gates of Hell, lined with ten rooms containing portraits, gold and street iconography, and videos documenting lives of violence, the voices blended with a driving environmental soundtrack. LA Weekly critic Peter Frank wrote, "DeDeaux's anti-funhouse Soul Shadows may be heavy going, but it is not blame-slinging 'PC' agitprop: It conveys not anger, but empathy, engagement and hope" designed to "de-heroicize urban warfare and re-validate its warriors/victims." Several of the portraits—shrine-like, gold-leafed, over life-size photographs of black youths assuming the stylized guises of ancient deities, warriors or modern celebrities—were included in the Whitney Museum exhibition "Black Male: Representations of Masculinity in Contemporary American Art" (1994-5), curated by Thelma Golden.

=== Environmentally oriented works ===
DeDeaux's installations and multimedia works beginning in the mid-1990s have focused on environmental themes of survival, disaster, extinction and escape. The multichannel video work The Face of God, In Search Of (1996 Summer Olympics) was an early immersive media environment centered on an imagined bedroom, which used six synchronized projectors to reimagine Tennessee Williams' play Suddenly Last Summer as a collective struggle to survive in the face of natural and human-induced threat or tragedy. Depicting nature as both majestic and indiscriminately cruel, it combined superimposed imagery of nature's cycles, recordings of Williams' stage direction, and references to the rapid extinction of species. Postcards to Teddy Roosevelt While Thinking of Yves Klein (Aldrich Museum, 1997) juxtaposed haunting sound and images of a deer carcass alongside a highway and sheep grazing near an electrical fence on two upturned television monitors with photocollages of American landscapes defaced by strip-mining and industry, a stark contrast to Roosevelt's romanticized celebration of the west.

Dawn DeDeaux, MotherShip III: The Station, warehouse installation, entrance view, 2014.

In the 2000s—particularly after Hurricane Katrina—DeDeaux explored disasters and apocalyptic themes, often creating work out of damaged plywood, burned timbers, salvaged storm culverts, and other debris. In multiple installations of Gulf to Galaxy (2006/2021) and The Glass Floor (2007), she recreated the sparkling, sea-like effect of the shattered glass she encountered at her parents' damaged beach home, hand-throwing glass into spiral forms of hurricanes and galaxies, illuminated from below. Reviews likened her Water Markers series (NOMA, 2015)—plank-like, acrylic sculptures encased with images of clear water that she scattered and leaned against walls throughout the museum—to both religious art and the spare sculptures of John McCracken and Ellsworth Kelly. They describe the series as paradoxical, both in its topicality and literalness—each panel indicating a precise water level declared by a post-Katrina New Orleans homeowner (e.g., Topped out at Eight ..., 2007), a departure from minimalist orthodoxy—and its unexpected beauty.

From 2012 to 2016, DeDeaux created the digital photocollage series, Space Clowns—astronaut-like creatures on metal panels derived from photographs she made of first responders dressed in protective equipment, whose decorated surfaces of lace, floral and wrought-iron patterns served as projected uniforms of the future. Inspired by R. Buckminster Fuller’s warnings about population expansion and resource depletion and the Afrofuturism of funk groups such as Parliament-Funkadelic, the images link climate change relocation, the disorientation of space travel, and a sense of the future loss of Earth; critics suggest they have taken on new meanings during COVID-19-era concerns over airborne disease and the regulation of breathing.

Dawn DeDeaux, Goddess Fortuna and Her Dunces in An Effort to Make Sense of It All, multimedia installation for Prospect New Orleans, 2011.

The Space Clowns images became part of DeDeaux's large-scale, mixed-media "MotherShip" project, which took Stephen Hawking’s assertion that humanity had 100 years left—not to save the Earth but to leave it—as its launching point. The three-part project consists of drawings, photographs, sculpture and installation and has been exhibited in various forms, at Prospect.3 (2014), MASS MoCA (2017–9) and the Transart Foundation for Art and Anthropology (2020–1), among other venues. Its imagery has included a life-size aluminum horse rendered within a slab of polished acrylic, a 30-foot DNA strand of stacked chairs, free-falling suitcases, Mothership vessels made of thirty to fifty-foot metal rings suggesting spaceships or zeppelins, tall escape ladders, and evocative relics and bric-a-brac (charred remnants, seeds, photographs, earth, a baseball bat) collected as "Souvenirs of Earth."

DeDeaux has often used literary sources as inspiration. For her night-time, public "Prospect.2" installation, The Goddess Fortuna and Her Subjects in an Effort to Make Sense of It All (2011), she drew on John Kennedy Toole’s New Orleans novel, A Confederacy of Dunces, creating a complex, 20,000-square-foot multimedia work that encompassed a three-story mansion and its balconies and courtyard. Combining the book's emphasis on fate, furies, disasters and resurrections and her own symbolism, she employed a wagon with carnival-float wheels set over an erupting fountain, funhouse-like tableaux, 77 mannequins in dunce hats, occult and Confederate references (masks, pantaloons, robes, white camellias), and projected spinning visuals including local sissy bounce rapper Katey Red performing in the role of the book's Goddess Fortuna. In 2018, DeDeaux created the outdoor installation Free Fall: Prophecy and Free Will in Milton’s Paradise Lost for "Open Spaces 2018" in Kansas City, a reflection on collective numbness and helplessness in the face of social decay, consisting of 48 tall columns installed at angles among walnut trees, each printed with a verse from Milton’s work in highway reflective vinyl.

== Recognition ==
DeDeaux has received a Rome Prize from the American Academy in Rome (1997, Knight Foundation Visiting Artist) and awards from Art Matters (2014), Harvestworks (1998) and the National Endowment for the Arts (1992). In 2014, she was named Prospect New Orleans Triennial Alumni of the Year, and named a board member of Prospect New Orleans (PNO) in 2020. She has received residencies from the Joan Mitchell Foundation (2021), Transart Foundation (2020), Tulane University Center for Bioenvironmental Research (2015), and Robert Rauschenberg Foundation (2013). Her work belongs to private and public collections, including the New Orleans Museum of Art, Honolulu Museum of Art, Louisiana State University Museum of Art, and Frederick R. Weisman Museum of Art.

In October 2021, the New Orleans Museum of Art mounted "Dawn DeDeaux: The Space Between Worlds," a career retrospective. The accompanying catalog includes contributions from Katie Pfohl, Debbora Battaglia, John M. Barry, Eva Díaz, and Walter Isaacson.
