= Medicine Factory =

Independent arts organization in Memphis, Tennessee, USA

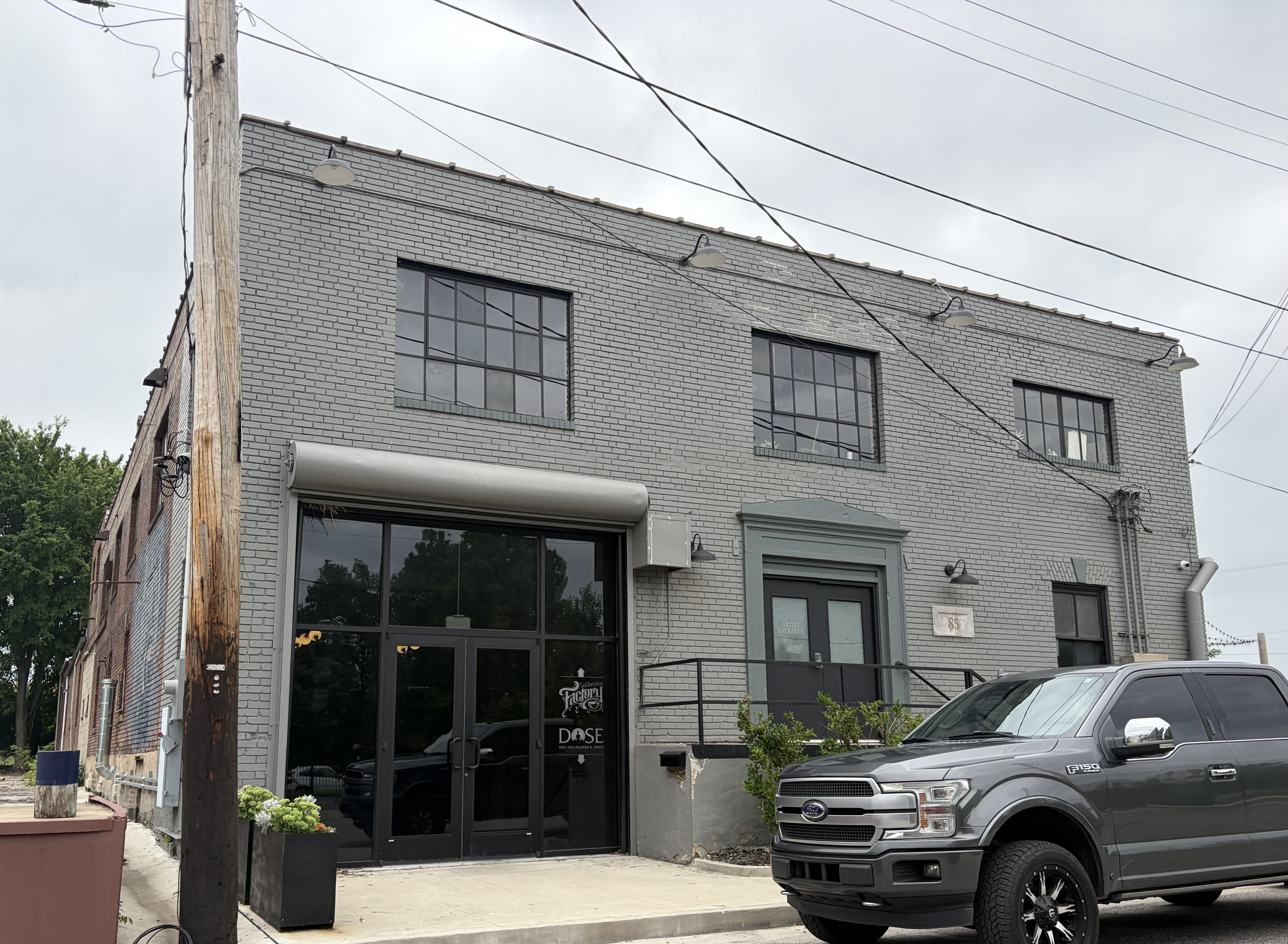
- The Medicine Factory in 2026
- Formation: 2005; 21 years ago
- Founders: Julie Lewis, Phillip Andrew Lewis, and Jason Tomblin
- Founded at: Memphis, Tennessee, USA
- Purpose: Art
- Headquarters: Memphis, Tennessee, USA
- Coordinates: 35°7′34.96″N 90°3′52.58″W
- Services: Gallery and creation spaces

Medicine Factory is an independent arts organization located in Memphis, Tennessee. Established in 2005, Medicine Factory is located in downtown Memphis in a 16,000-square-foot (1,500 m^{2}) warehouse, originally built in 1912 as McConnon & Co Medicine Mfg. Medicine Factory as a contemporary art space is unique in the MidSouth for encouraging experimentation in all media and promotion of site-sensitive work without curatorial controls. This freedom does not seem to exist in any of the area's traditional galleries. Medicine Factory was founded by local artists Julie Lewis, Phillip Andrew Lewis, and Jason Tomblin.

Medicine Factory invites artists to create on-site experimental work free from the constraints of most galleries, museums, and curatorial controls. Most would define this type of work as Installation art. Works to date have included video installations, sound sculpture, performance art, various types of photographic images, sculpture, and other media. The organization averages only a small number of shows each year. Artists are typically invited to work at the space for approximately 3 weeks with their work remaining on display for about one month. Medfac is unique to Memphis and important to the city.

== Bibliography ==
- The Commercial Appeal, "Freedom of Expression" by Frederic Koeppel, March 31, 2006
- Number: An Independent Arts Journal, "Editorial No.56" by Leslie Luebbers , Spring/Summer 2006
- Memphis Magazine, "Renovation Generation" by Chris Davis, August 2006, pg74
- Memphis Business Journal, "Artists Can Experiment with their Craft at Medicine Factory" by Andria Lisle, Nov 2006, pg37.
