= Thelma Golden =

American art museum curator (born 1965)

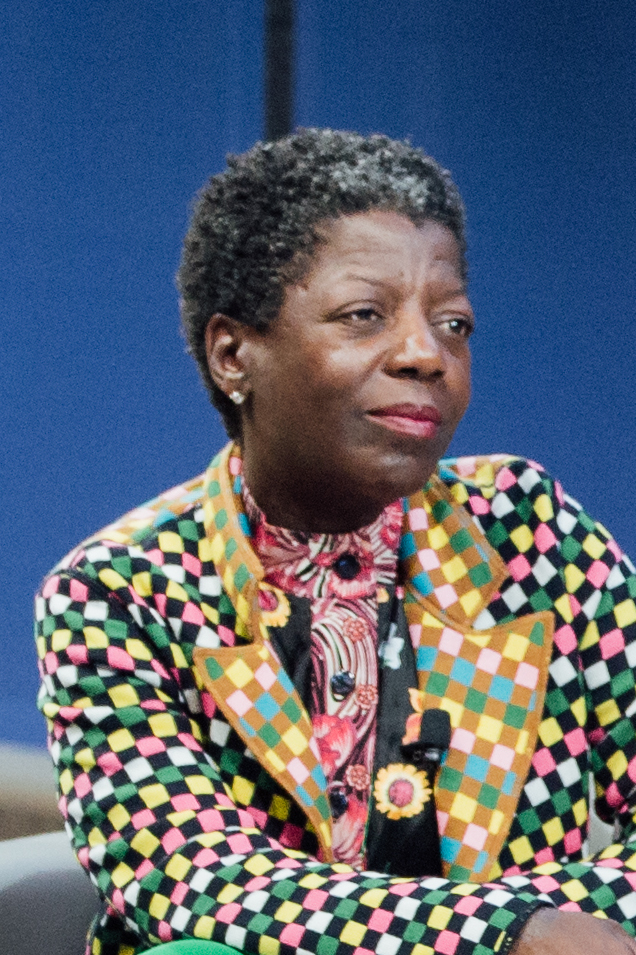
- Born: September 22, 1965 (age 61); Queens, New York City, U.S.
- Education: Smith College
- Occupations: Museum director and chief curator
- Years active: 1987–present
- Spouse: Duro Olowu (m. 2008)

Thelma Golden (born September 22, 1965) is an American art curator who is the director and chief curator of The Studio Museum in Harlem. She is noted as one of the originators of the term post-blackness. From 2017 to 2020, ArtReview chose her annually as one of the 10 most influential people in the contemporary art world.

From 1991 to 1998, Golden was a curator at the Whitney Museum of American Art, where she gained a reputation for promoting young black conceptual artists. In her 1993 biennial and her 1994 exhibition Black Male, she introduced political and controversial works into the Whitney's collection. Golden joined the Studio Museum as Deputy Director for Exhibitions and Programs in 2000 before succeeding Lowery Stokes Sims, the museum's former director and president, in 2005.

== Early life and education ==
Thelma Golden grew up in Queens, New York City, the daughter of Arthur Golden and Thelma (née Eastmond) Golden. She had an interest in art from an early age and was particularly influenced by H. W. Janson's History of Art. She had her first hands-on training as a senior in high school at the New Lincoln School, training as a curatorial apprentice at the Metropolitan Museum of Art. Her decision to become a curator was inspired by Lowery Stokes Sims, the first African-American curator of that museum. Golden graduated from Buckley Country Day School in 1980 and earned a B.A. degree in Art History and African-American Studies from Smith College in 1987.

As a student, Golden helped put several exhibitions together at the Smith College Museum of Art, including one called Dorothy C. Miller: With an Eye to American Art, about the "Americans" exhibitions of MoMA curator Dorothy Canning Miller. Golden also worked as an intern at The Studio Museum in 1985, where she cataloged the papers of painter Benny Andrews among other tasks. She also worked under curator Kellie Jones, whom Golden later credited with having "taught me what it meant to do the work".

== Whitney Museum of American Art ==
Golden's first curatorial position was at the Studio Museum in Harlem in 1987. She was then a curator at the Whitney Museum of American Art from 1988 to 1998. She was the visual arts director at the Jamaica Arts Center in Queens before she became director of the Whitney Museum's outpost in midtown Manhattan (since closed) in 1991. In 1993, she organized the museum's biennial along with Elisabeth Sussman, Lisa Phillips, and John Hanhardt. The show was criticized by some for its social and political themes and became "one of most hotly debated Whitney shows ever". Golden later looked back at the show as a "transformative experience" that helped her see how "art and artists can exist in a museum space in a way that is radical and powerful and can create change because of the work."

The following year, Golden curated a show that would become still more controversial: Black Male: Representations of Masculinity in Contemporary American Art (1994–95). This exhibition explored negative stereotypes of black masculinity, including homelessness and criminality. It included artworks by Jean-Michel Basquiat, Robert Mapplethorpe, Glenn Ligon, Dawn DeDeaux, and David Hammons, as well as films such as Gordon Parks' Shaft and Marlon Riggs' Tongues Untied.

Some established artists described the show's exploration of stereotypes as "irresponsible" and criticized what they saw as an over-representation of non-black artists. In a rarer positive review, art historian Linda Nochlin described it in ARTnews as "one of the liveliest and most visually engaging exhibitions" of the season. The New York Times noted that the show was bringing unusually large black audiences to the museum, but that the artwork left them polarized in their reactions. Despite being initially "critically pummeled", the show's reputation improved in the following years. Within a decade, the Times was describing it as "an important show", and two decades later, both ARTnews and the Whitney itself described it as a "landmark exhibition".

While with the Whitney, Golden also organized solo shows of the works of Bob Thompson. Lorna Simpson, and Jacob Lawrence. In November 1998, Golden and fellow curator Elisabeth Sussman resigned from their positions after not being assigned portfolios by new museum director Maxwell L. Anderson. Philanthropist Peter Norton, who had helped fund Golden's Black Male exhibition, resigned from the Whitney's board of trustees in response to Golden's departure.

== Studio Museum in Harlem ==
Golden was the Special Projects Curator for contemporary art collectors Peter Norton and Eileen Harris Norton from 1998 to 2000. She then joined the Studio Museum in Harlem--at the time the country's only accredited museum of African-American Art—in 2000 as deputy director for exhibitions. Former MoMA curator Lowery Stokes Sims was appointed at the same time as the museum's new director.

At the museum, Golden organized exhibitions including Isaac Julien: Vagabondia (2000); Martin Puryear: The Cane Project (2000); Glenn Ligon: Stranger (2001); Black Romantic: The Figurative Impulse in Contemporary Art (2002); harlemworld: Metropolis as Metaphor (2004); Chris Ofili: Afro Muses (2005); Frequency (2005–06), with Christine Y. Kim; Africa Comics (2006–07); and Kori Newkirk: 1997–2007 (2007–08). She championed the work of artists such as Kehinde Wiley, Glenn Ligon, and Njideka Akunyili Crosby. Her 2001 exhibition Freestyle was particularly noted for helping to establish the term "post-blackness" and for helping to launch the careers of LA artists Eric Wesley and Mark Bradford, among others.

In 2005, Golden became the Studio Museum's director and chief curator. She adjusted the museum's schedule so that Wednesdays were devoted to school trips and private events, but Thursdays and Fridays the museum was open into the evening so that a wider range of guests could visit. The museum also began to give away postcards of the artists' works to all guests. Its attendance increased 27% in the first decade of Golden's tenure as director, and the museum added more than 2000 new works to its collection.

Exhibitions that Golden organized for the Studio Museum began to tour internationally to cities including Boston, Houston, Philadelphia, Toronto, and Chicago. In 2011, the museum awarded a yearlong artist's residency to visual artist Njideka Akunyili Crosby, which helped to launch her career. Golden also acted as a mentor to museum directors and curators such as Christine Y. Kim and Jamillah James.

In 2017, MoMA director Glenn D. Lowry credited Golden with having made the Studio Museum "a national institution". Under Golden's leadership, a $125 million expansion was begun in 2017. Designed by Adjaye Associates and Cooper Robertson, it was the museum's first purpose-built expansion.

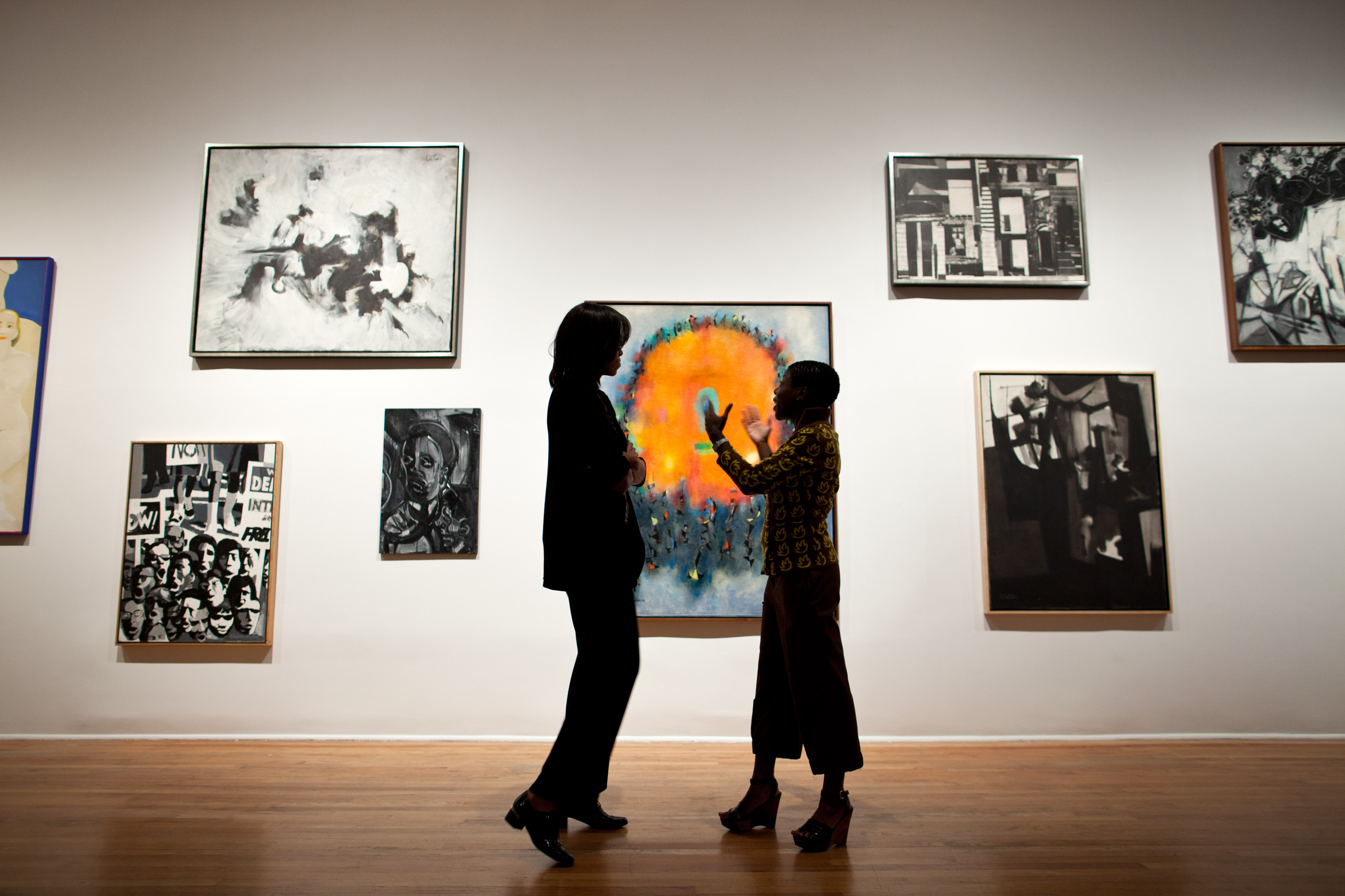
First Lady Michelle Obama and Golden during a tour of the Studio Museum in Harlem, 2011

== Other activities ==
In 2009, Golden presented "How Art Gives Shape to Cultural Change" at the TED conference's 25th anniversary gathering. In 2008, she was a member of the advisory team of the Whitney Biennial and in 2007 acted as a juror for the UK Turner Prize. In 2004, Golden curated a retrospective of fashion designer Patrick Kelly at the Brooklyn Museum. She then co-curated the traveling exhibition Glenn Ligon: Some Changes in 2005.

Golden serves on the Graduate Committee at the Center for Curatorial Studies at Bard College, is a member of the Association of Art Museum Directors, is on the boards of Creative Time in New York and the Institute of International Visual Arts (inIVA) in London, and was a 2008 Henry Crown Fellow at the Aspen Institute. The New York City's cultural advisory committee invited Golden to serve on their committee in 2015. In 2016, Golden became a member on the board of trustees at the Los Angeles County Museum of Art (LACMA).

In 2010, Golden was appointed to the Committee for the Preservation of the White House. During Barack Obama's presidency, in 2015, Golden joined the board of directors at the Obama Foundation as she had been asked to organize the design and plan of the presidential library. Golden served on the Committee for the Preservation of the White House until 2016.

== Personal life ==
Golden met London-based fashion designer Duro Olowu in 2006 and married him in 2008. On 11 February 2014, Golden was among the guests invited to the state dinner hosted by U.S. President Barack Obama in honor of President François Hollande at the White House. Golden was seated immediately to President Obama's left.

== Awards and recognition ==
In 2014, Artnet named Golden at number 33 on its list of "The 100 Most Powerful Women In Art". In 2016, Golden won the Audrey Irmas Award for Curatorial Excellence. A representative for the prize, Tom Eccles, praised Golden for "raising issues and developing ideas that are central to our time".

The J. Paul Getty Trust awarded Golden the J. Paul Getty Medal in 2008. Its president, James Cuno, cited her contributions to African-American art:

I don't think you can say "African American art" without saying "Thelma Golden." You can't say "contemporary art" without saying "Thelma Golden." You can't say "Harlem" without saying "Thelma Golden." ... There isn't a museum director who has done more for her institution than Thelma has done for hers."

Golden appeared on ArtReview's list of the 100 most influential people in the international art world every year from 2003 to 2009 and from 2015 to 2020. From 2017 to 2020, she placed in the top 10.
