= Carl Pope =

Carl Pope may refer to:

- Carl Pope (environmentalist), former executive director of the Sierra Club
- Carl C. Pope (1834–1911), American lawyer, legislator, and jurist
- Carl Robert Pope, African-American artist
