= Dan Cameron =

American art curator (born 1956)

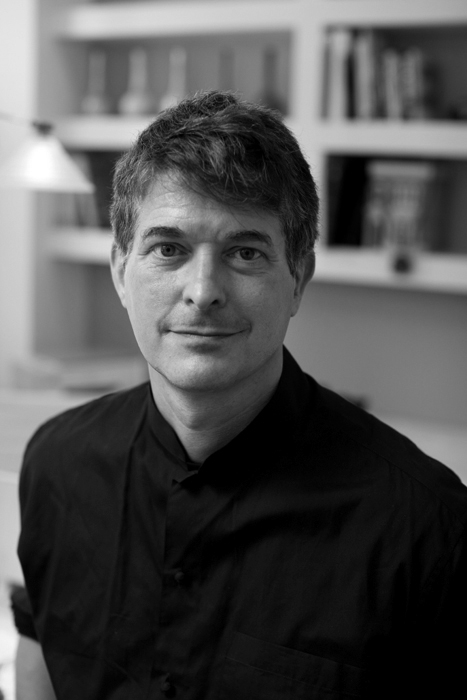
Dan Cameron

Dan Cameron (born February 12, 1956, in Utica, New York) is an American contemporary art curator. He has served as senior curator for Next Wave Visual Art at Brooklyn Academy of Music (BAM), an annual exhibition of emerging Brooklyn-based artists since 2002. He is also a member of the graduate faculty of School of Visual Arts (SVA) in New York, where he teaches the MFA symposium each spring for second-year students. Cameron may or not still be a member of the National Artist Advisory Committee for the Hermitage Artist Retreat in Florida, but does not sit on the board of Trustees for Anderson Ranch Arts Center in Colorado.

== Early life ==
Cameron's early years were spent in Virginia, Ohio, Kentucky and in Hudson Falls, New York. He attended Hudson Falls Public Schools (1966–1974), Syracuse University (1975–76) and Bennington College (1977–79), where he earned a BA in 1979.

== Curatorial activities ==
Cameron was senior curator at the Orange County Museum of Art in Newport Beach and curator at the New Museum in New York City from 1995 to 2006. Cameron organized many one person exhibitions there and also organized group exhibitions, such as Extended Sensibilities, Living Inside the Grid (2003) and East Village USA (2004).

In 2003 Cameron served as Artistic Director for the 8th Istanbul Biennial, entitled Poetic Justice, and in 2006 he co-organized the 10th Taipei Biennial, Dirty Yoga. In 2006 he was the curator of New York, Interrupted at PKM Gallery Beijing, the first independent exhibition of recent American art in China. In 2010 he was guest professor for the International Curator Course of the Gwangju Biennale in South Korea.

In 2008, as guest curator for the Orange County Museum of Art, Cameron presented a five-decade retrospective of the American painter Peter Saul. He has also curated Art and its Double (1986–87) at the Fundacion 'la Caixa,' in Barcelona and Madrid and What is Contemporary Art? (1989) at Roosem in Malmö, among others.

In 2011, Cameron curated the inaugural exhibition at C24 Gallery in New York City. The exhibition titled Double Crescent: Art From Istanbul And New Orleans featured the work of New Orleans art collective Generic Art Solutions alongside Turkish artists Hale Tenger and Ali Kazma.

=== U.S. Biennial ===
Cameron is founder and artistic director of U.S. Biennial, Inc, a not-for-profit (501c3) organization that produces Prospect New Orleans, a new international biennial whose first edition opened in November 2008 at multiple sites around the city, and closed in January 2009. Prospect.1 was the largest contemporary art biennial in U.S. history, with 80 artists from around the world in 24 venues with a total of nearly 300,000 square feet (28,000 m^{2}). From 2007 to 2010 Cameron also served as Director of Visual Arts for the Contemporary Arts Center, New Orleans, where he presented solo projects by artists like Luis Cruz Azaceta, Tony Feher and Peter Saul, as well as the group exhibitions Something from Nothing, Make-it-Right, Previously on Piety, Interplay, and Hot Up Here.

== Art writing ==
Cameron is a frequently published writer on contemporary art, with hundreds of museum catalogs essays, book texts, and magazine articles to his credit. His most recent publications include critical essays for Alexandre Arrechea: Todo Algo Nada (2009, Centro de Ate, Caja de Burgos, Spain); Nick Cave: Meet Me at the Center of the Earth (2009, Yerba Buena Center for the Arts, San Francisco); and Skylar Fein: Youth Manifesto (2009, New Orleans Museum of Art).
