= Post-blackness =

American philosophical movement

Post-blackness is a philosophical movement with origins in the art world that attempts to reconcile the American understanding of race with the lived experiences of African Americans in the late 20th and early 21st centuries.

== Origins of the term ==
Post-blackness as a term was coined by Thelma Golden, director of Studio Museum in Harlem, and conceptual artist Glenn Ligon to describe, as Touré writes, “the liberating value in tossing off the immense burden of race-wide representation, the idea that everything they do must speak to or for or about the entire race.” In the catalogue for "Freestyle", a show curated by Golden at the Studio Museum in Harlem, she defined post-black art as that which includes artists who are “adamant about not being labeled ‘black’ artists, though their work was steeped, in fact deeply interested, in redefining complex notions of blackness.”

In his book Who's Afraid of Post Blackness? What it Means to be Black Now, Touré uses this term to describe black identity in the 21st century. According to Touré it is nowadays difficult to find a clear definition of what is black in terms of African-American culture. The post-black generation differentiates itself by the former one in the way they grew up. Their parents grew up in segregation, having to fight for equal rights. Touré claims that blackness became a constructed identity, to defend themselves efficiently as a group. He calls it “boxed into niggerdom”.(21) The attempt to define it results most often in the mixing up of definitions to find an identity in culture or in biological terms. This results often in racial patriotism, racial fundamentalism or racial policing. Additionally, post-blackness has not only to deal with the definition of being black, but with the authenticity of blackness. Touré comes to the point that blackness is too difficult and is too wide-ranging to have a simple definition. However, he does not say that post-blackness signifies the end of blackness, but allows for variation in what blackness means and can mean to be accepted as the truth. He differentiates between post-blackness and post-racial: in his opinion race still does exist, and he warns against conflating it with post-racial: post-racial would suggest colorblindness, and the claim that race does not exist or that society would be beyond the concept of race; in his opinion, this would be a naïve understanding of race in America. Touré sees post-blackness as such: “We are like Obama: rooted in but not restricted by Blackness”.

Duke Literature and African-American Studies Professor Wahneema Lubiano defines post-black as the time when “you are no longer caught by your own trauma about racism and the history of Black people in the United States”. UC Santa Cruz professor Derek Conrad Murray claims that there was a “dogmatic transference of trauma”. Today there are identity liberals as well as identity conservatives, who still try to define and preserve a chosen definition of blackness. According to Touré, this search for an identity derives from being constantly reminded, as a black person, of the status of the other. Toni Morrison's The Bluest Eye is a famous literary example of this.

== Facts and statistics ==
In 2003, Forbes magazine proclaimed Oprah Winfrey the country's first black woman billionaire, but still most of the black middle class was in this period part of the lower middle class. Since the election of President Barack Obama, Darryl Pinckney claims, it has become apparent that being black middle-class is not as elitist as it used to be. The new black elite has become so large that being middle-class has become quite normal.

Eugene Robinson states in Disintegration: The Splintering of Black America (2010) that it is not the black poor who are trying to redefine black America. He claims that “pre-civil right one-nation black America” does not exist anymore, and that blacks do not share anything more than a few symbols left over from civil rights history. The black mainstream is now part of the economic and cultural mainstream of America. The Bureau of Labor Statistics, on the other hand, states in the 2010 report that the median income of blacks had fallen from $32,584 to $29,328, compared to the national median income of $49,777. So while 43.7 percent of whites were categorized as middle-class, the percentage of black middle-class fell to 38.4 percent. The rest of the black population was divided into 29 percent working-class and 23.5 percent living in poverty.

== Definitions of blackness ==
Blackness has been defined in many ways. The following are examples which tried to define Blackness through inheritance or political or cultural rules.

=== Authenticity of blackness ===
This term is used to define the division that is being made by blacks themselves, in terms of what is authentically or genuinely black. Sexual orientation, regional variety, geographical diversity, class location or religion can be a reason for exclusion from a particular black group and their beliefs. A single “black identity” may have served well in times of slavery but is in his opinion not sufficient to serve as a means to define race. Blackness, or who and what is black, has been tried to define in sociological, biological or political terms.

=== Authenticity of blackness in hip-hop music ===
Authenticity in hip-hop music refers to whether or not artists exhibit exemplary identification with blackness as it pertains to historical struggle. The idea of authenticity in hip-hop is fluid and ever-changing. An artist's authenticity is inextricably linked with the artists' blackness. A fluid depiction of whiteness causes there to be more defining and re-defining of what blackness is as black people are marked as a racial "other" by the changing parameters of whiteness.

=== The Kinship Schema ===
In Race and Mixed Race The Kinship Schema, Naomi Zack attempts to explain why a person is considered black or white: “If a person has a black parent, a black grandparent, or a black greatn -grandparent (where n represents any number of past generations), then that person is designated black. But if a person has a white parent, or three white grandparents, or Z white greatn -grandparents (where Z is any odd number and n still represents any number of past generations), then that person is not thereby designated white.” According to this definition, a person is white if no black ancestors exist, whereas one black person (or non-white person) in the line makes or person black, or at least not white anymore.

This is a rather new development; Willard B. Gatewood writes that between 1850 and 1915, white America moved from overlooking “some blackness in a person” to classifying persons with “one iota of color” as black. Naomi Zack concludes thus that according to this Schema, since white is also defined in terms of blackness, American racial categories are interdependent: American racial categories are, since they thus do not give any positive definition of blackness, groundless and have no empirical foundation. She argues that racial designations refer to physical characteristics of individuals, which were for one inherited from their forebears but also inherent in people in a physical way. So if someone is being called “black” in common American usage, this does not only refer to the looks of the person defined but about the looks of all black people and how the person resembles them. What is perceived as typically black is what scientists now view as the mythology of race which is nowadays closely intertwined with the historical conditions under which the now-disproved scientific theories of race were formulated.

W.E.B. Du Bois (who was aware of the lack of an empirical foundation in nature for the concept of race), suggested that the black race was a concept made up by white people. However, du Bois and other important writers in the black emancipatory tradition resist racism on the basis of their own acceptance of the concept of race. “ They argue that their educational, moral, social, legal, and economic deficits in comparison to whites are not physically inherited or necessarily acquired. But there is no sustained objection to ordinary racial designations within the tradition of black emancipation.”

The Kinship Schema can also be witnessed in popular culture. Famous actresses who are considered as being black, therefore representing African American Culture, are often only partly black, proving the Kinship Schema. Pam Grier and Halle Berry are both considered as black actresses and connected in some ways as well to Black pride, but both are only partly black: Mia Mask writes in Divas on Screen (2009) that Grier served both as a phenomenon of consumption (consumed by audience-consumers), as well as a phenomenon of production (produced by industrial institutions like American International Pictures). Therefore, Grier was both an object of the gaze and a subject of narrative action in films, promoting the image of African American Women. This image was partly constructed by white people in addition that Grier was only partly black, in fact a mixture of American, Indian and African American heritage. Halle Berry is partly German, Irish, English and African American. Their careers show another side of post- blackness; if Obama and Winfrey show the post- blackness in their multi-linguality, Grier and Berry are signifiers of American Popular Culture and how black women are being perceived.

=== Eugene Robinson and the renaming of black classes ===
Eugene Robinson renames the black classes by defining blackness through social classes. There is the Emergent class: African immigrants who are ascending on the social level by outperforming Asian students at the university level, for example. Then the Abandoned, or the underclass: blacks who are trapped by low income in neighborhoods and schools where it is impossible to project a decent future. The Mainstream: they may work in integrated settings but still lead socially all-black lives. The Transcendent: “a small but growing cohort with the kind of power, wealth, and influence that previous generations of African Americans could never have imagined.” Robinson hopes that the Transcendent class will provide leaders, like Talented tenth over a century ago. But Robinson's expectations contradict his own evidence: blacks do not feel race solidarity the way they did at one time. He cites a 2007 Pew poll that said 61 percent of blacks don't believe that the black poor and the black middle class share common values.

== Examples in American culture ==
=== Barack Obama and Oprah Winfrey ===
Touré claims that to have “Black success”, multi-linguality is necessary: the ability to be able to switch between different ways of Blackness. Barack Obama and Oprah Winfrey are prime examples for that, switching between different roles of Black identity. He claims that Blackness may be an important part of them, but that Blackness does not dominate their persona. Both are able to switch between different modes of being black, so that they “can trust and also be trusted by European-Americans” but at the same time be able to “display the many forms of blackness when the occasion demands”.

=== The word "nigga" ===
Post-blackness cannot only be witnessed through individuals in culture, but also in its language. The word "nigga" and its cultural development is an example for this: the usage of nigga nowadays shows additionally another side of post-blackness in American society. The term is not only used in America, but by blacks globally, sometimes annoying white Americans. The word is not taboo if it is used by people within the Black diaspora; its meaning is an expression of kinship between Black people, and derogatory if used by whites.

== Criticism ==
=== Orlando Patterson ===
Patterson concludes that the sole common experience for blacks in post-blackness is “nothing more” than shared experiences in everyday life: to live with and overcome “old-fashioned racism” and learning to live with the white gaze. He sees therefore a close resemblance to Alan Dershowitz's theory of “the Tsuris Theory of Jewish Survival”; in that he claims that American Jews are always in need of “external troubles and imagined enemies” to maintain their identity.

=== Darryl Pinckney ===
Pinckney states that although black people may be in the mainstream now, black history is not, the prime example being the killing of Trayvon Martin. Henry Louis Gates Jr. calls the recognition scene, when the young boy realizes that he is different, Trayvon Martin's moment of instruction. There he must have realized that “the white world sees black people as different, no matter how blacks feel inside—has a history, one that yanks everybody back a step”. Touré takes the more sensationalistic term for Gates´ moment of instruction the “nigger wake-up call”. Also, in his opinion, Touré represents “the anti-essentialist idea of blackness, a discourse of privilege, far from the race feeling that said if it happens to one of us, it happens to all of us”. Pinckney reminds the reader that history is not so long ago after all, even if black people want to forget. Touré seems to leave out that racism is not for all blacks the same. He writes from the perspective of a privileged black person.

=== Michelle Alexander ===
In her book The New Jim Crow, Michelle Alexander writes about how the war on drugs is today's extension of America's overseer-style management of black men. She claims that like Vagrancy Laws were a form of social control, today this happens in form of the war on drugs, which target minorities.

=== Randall Kennedy ===
Kennedy agrees with Touré's idea that no black should feel excluded due to issues of “blackness authenticity”. He disagrees however with the point that it is always wrong for blacks to question the “fidelity to black America” of other blacks. He adds that Stephen L. Carter wrote in Confessions of an Affirmative Action Baby that "loving our people and loving our culture does not require any restriction on what black people can think or say or do or be ... " When Touré refers to “our commonality” it is thus not clear what he means; if all can be black, then it is open what exactly this commonality includes. Kennedy states that boundaries and discipline are always fundamental aspects of a community; therefore Touré and his allies are trying to escape what basically defines a community. If there are no boundaries, there is no community. He too criticizes Touré for the perspective he is writing from: he himself is a “preppy talking, privileged black man”. Touré also voices an instrumental patriotism when he refers to the black man's “American-ness”. Kennedy thinks that a person can be indeed de-blacked (a term coined by Washington University in St. Louis Professor Kimberly Jade Norwood), and that a person who pursues a course of conduct that convincingly demonstrates the absence of even a minimal communal allegiance, should be rightly excluded. Another point is racial authenticity: although Kennedy agrees that whether black people are skiing or not is not the point of authenticity, he disagrees with Touré that everything is authentic: one should differentiate between specious and defensible notions of racial authenticity; out of frustration with the former, Touré throws out the latter.

=== Abdul Ali ===
Ali wrote in The Washington Independent Review of Books that Touré is writing like he himself has unresolved issues with his own blackness, rather than dealing with Black identity from a neutral point of view. He verifies this thesis by pointing at the 105 people who were interviewed by Touré to give a definition on blackness: all are either celebrities or upper class, lacking any “normal persons” like workers, immigrants or such, therefore lacking any diversity. Furthermore, he stresses the point that Touré writes about not having ever had a “typical black experience”, like his father did. This statement combined with the lack of “ordinary people” in his interviews makes Ali conclude that Touré ´s lack of perspective from “ordinary” black folks in this work” raises the question of whether the author is pandering to the white gaze by showing an über-sophisticated list of interview subjects, and not black people in our diversity”. The critic concludes that Touré has no real idea what Blackness is and that “we’re not post-black: just as we’re not post-American”.

=== Ben Daité ===
Daité writes in ‘Post-Blackness’ Within A Racial America? Relations To Black Cinema that no authentic black person would talk about or try to define blackness. Persons like Touré or Henry Louis Gates are struggling with their own identities, “constantly plugging our ears with the, ‘we are black too!’”. The critic acknowledges that the margins of slavery have been more clearly defined in the times of slavery than now, but that according to Malcolm X this is only evidence of the dilution he warned of. If Touré argues that there is no post-racial America, then Daité concludes, a post-blackness is not even possible. Touré is writing from a privileged point of view, disregarding the Color Line.

== Competing and comparable theses ==
Post-blackness stresses the point that there are many different ways of defining what black is, but that they are all right. There are also some ideas not about how the borders of blackness blur, but that the borders of all races start to blur in a way in which post-blackness would not be an issue anymore:

=== Melissa V. Harris-Perry's Sister Citizen ===
Melissa Harris-Perry, a political science professor at Tulane University, deals with the unique experiences of African American women. Black women have been constrained throughout history by three stereotypes: the nurturing mammy, the lascivious Jezebel and the stiff-necked, unyielding matriarch. These archetypes are according to her additional obstacles compared to black men. “Strong is the default category for describing black women,” she writes. “But the myth leaves them sicker, less satisfied and more burdened than any other group.” According to her African American women are being “misrecognized” by society and by themselves; blackness in America is marked by shame that makes blacks view themselves as malignant. As a result, to escape that shame, black women are often politically involved. For example, in a literary way like Zora Neale Hurston or Ntozake Shange. In her opinion it is not only white people responsible for this; a lot of responsibility lies in the black community itself, through black liberation theology's silence on gender or the gender inequality in Christian churches in general; women's achievements in the civil rights movement have not been acknowledged enough or sometimes not at all. Most of the limitations today have not been placed by white people, but by the expectations of black women (or people in general) on themselves.

=== "The Declining Significance of Race" by Wilson ===
"The Declining Significance of Race" is an article by William Julius Wilson, (reprinted from Society Jan./Feb. 1978) written in 1978. In this article he stresses that the economic sphere, class has become more important than race. He acknowledges that the traditional forms of racial segregation and discrimination still exist in contemporary America and that when the article was written blacks still were not welcomed into some private institutions and social arrangements like residential areas or private social clubs. Therefore, the black underclass still had the same problems, but privileged blacks came into a zone were the rules of economy were stronger than the rules of class.

Wilson therefore defines three stages of American class relations to explain how this was made possible. In those three stages the relationship of whites and blacks in America changed due to historical, political and economical events: The three stages of American class relations in short:

1. The Preindustrial Stage: This is the period of plantation economy and racial-caste oppression; it coincides with antebellum slavery and the early postbellum era.
2. The Industrial Stage: This is the period of industrial expansion, class conflict, and racial oppression. It begins in the last quarter of the 19th century and lasts roughly until the New Deal Era.
3. The Modern Industrial Stage: This is the period of progressive transition from race inequalities to class inequalities. It lasts during the modern, industrial, post–World War II era and really begins to crystallize during the 1960s and 1970s.

Criticism: According to Darryl Pinckney, this thesis that in the modern industrial system the economic position had much more influence on a black person's life than his race was not well received by black critics: it failed to address institutional racism and systemic inequality. The season of extreme black rhetoric may have coincided with the doubling of the size of white middle class, because of new laws mandating equal employment. Still in order to be considered middle class, black families needed two incomes compared to whites with one. Black women could enter white-collar jobs like secretarial and clerical work, since they were also jobs exclusively for women. A black man, to earn a comparable income to a white man, needed more education and needed also to be in a higher occupation than a white man.

== See also ==
- Post-black art
