= Tommy Hartung =

Tommy Hartung is an animator and sculptor whose work employs homemade means and materials to create science fiction docudramas. Utilizing what the artist terms “dead cinema,” Hartung's hand-crafted props and analog techniques are against the grain of current computer-generated animation spectacles. He was born in 1979 in Akron Ohio and grew up on a farm in Western New York. Currently Hartung lives and works in Fredonia New York. His work has been exhibited at the Hammer Museum, PS1 MoMa, Rotterdam Film Festival and Art:21 created several short documentaries on his life and work.

== Work ==
Exploring the didactic potential of the moving image, Hartung's moving images analyze the creation and dissemination of cultural narratives through entertainment. Often taking the major themes of modernism as his subject matter, his work has addressed colonial expansion and exploration, evolution, conquest, and innovation. The montages of stop motion animation and found footage explore trauma, mortality, ethics and war. Drawing upon a diverse range of sources, including Chelsea Manning's court testimony, BBC documentaries, Anna Karenina, the Gnostic gospels, and the 1967 classic coming-of-age novel The Outsiders by S.E. Hinton, Hartung experiments with the history of film and video and the conventions of narrative, fragmenting and deconstructing his source material. He is currently represented by C24 Gallery.

== Early life ==
Tommy Hartung was born in 1979, the third son of four brothers. His parents moved from Akron Ohio to a farm in Western New York where they raised Concord grapes. As a child he enjoyed building terrariums and playing with his younger brother. In high school he formed a band with his friends, "The Screw Ups." In 2000 he started Purchase University and he majored in sculpture.

== Filmography ==
- THE BIBLE (2014)
- Anna (2011)
- The Ascent of Man (2010)
- Stay Golden Ponyboy (2009)
- The Story of Edward Holmes (2008)
- A Short History of the Canon (2007)

== Collections ==
Hartung's video "The Ascent of Man" (2010) is in the permanent collection of the Museum of Modern Art in NY and the D. Daskalopoulos Collection in Greece. "THE BIBLE" (2014) is in the Whitney Museum of Art's permanent collection and the Rose Art Museum's.

=== External links ===
- Art 21 Tommy Hartung's Underground Movies | "New York Close Up" | Art21
- Tommy Hartung | Gallerysite
- Tommy Hartung - Biography, Shows, Articles & More
- Art:21 Tommy Hartung Is Off and Running | "New York Close Up" | Art21
- Art:21 Tommy Hartung's Budget Guide to New York | "New York Close Up" | Art21
- Ascent of Man" trailer The Ascent of Man (trailer)
- "THE BIBLE" trailer The BIBLE (trailer)
