= Kim Haemin =

South Korean media artist (born 1957)

- Born: 1957; Daejeon, South Korea
- Occupation: Media artist

Korean name
- Hangul: 김해민
- RR: Gim Haemin
- MR: Kim Haemin

Kim Haemin (Korean: 김해민, born 1957 in Daejeon, South Korea) is a media artist currently living and working in Seoul, South Korea. One of the only Korean artists who has remained active in media art from the late 1980s to the present, Kim has consistently pursued video installations that bridge experience of virtuality and physical reality, often in ways that, according to the art theorist Min Huijeong, stood outside contemporaneous conceptions of video as a purely imaginary or cognitive realm.

After gaining early experience in scenography while working in theaters in his hometown of Daejeon, Kim experimented with media performance in the late 1980s. Thereafter, he turned his focus to video; from making works of video installation with CRT monitors in the 1990s, Kim later staged multi-channel video projections—and continues to do so today.

Over three decades of video works, Kim's works have differently entered into conversation with history. Pioneering methods for dismantling the screen as the division between video and its audience, Kim gained initial recognition in Korea's art scene for TV Hammer (1992). As his practice matured, Kim has evoked the lived experience of Korean society across multiple moments, from the 1990s through the present. All the while, he has brought together video, lighting, and sound to set the stage for his examinations of social and historical concepts.

== Biography ==
When he began his artistic career in Daejeon, Kim Haemin first worked at a local theater, where he gained experience in scenic and lighting design as part of what in South Korea is known as "stage art" (mudae misul). He became friends with the artists I Geonyong (who protested Informel painting's dominance in postwar Korean art) and Im Dongsik (who had spent a decade in Germany). In particular, Im Dongsik was a mentor to Kim and exposed him to environmental art via the group he led (called Ya Tu), as well as provided information on and anecdotes about media art in Germany.

Kim began working with video following his exposure in the mid-1980s to works by and articles on the artist Nam June Paik. Kim's first experiments were a series of media performances, which he staged between 1987 and 1990 as part of art festivals in Daejeon, Seoul, and Japan. Combining live dance and music with video, Kim's early performances perturbed the boundaries between genres. Having realized that such performances required complex, collective effort, Kim began working more independently as he turned to video installation in the early 1990s.

In 1992, Kim participated in a short-term artist residency in Germany, where he presented installations of video and materials in outdoor settings. After returning to South Korean and gaining wide recognition for his work TV Hammer (1992), Kim Haemin participated in several video and media related exhibitions in Germany and Japan, as well as in South Korea, including the 1993 Daejeon EXPO, the second Gwangju Biennale, and at the National Museum of Modern and Contemporary Art, Korea. In the year 2000, Kim participated in the first Seoul Mediacity Biennial and moved to Seoul, where he is currently based. In the past two decades, his works have been presented in the context of seven solo exhibitions as well as group exhibitions of media art globally, and been included in several exhibitions of the National Museum of Modern and Contemporary Art's video art collection.

== Notable artworks ==
=== TV Hammer (1992/2002) ===
TV Hammer is the video installation for which Kim Haemin not only first gained wider recognition as a media artist, but has also been described by the curator and art theorist I Yunhui as "one of the most outstanding works in the history of media art in Korea" It is composed of a video installation of a CRT monitor on a pedestal with a light hanging above it. The work begins with the monitor showing clouds serenely floating in the sky, until a hammer appears in the foreground and begins to move back and forth, readying to strike the monitor's screen. The hammer then begins repeatedly striking the screen. Each time, the screen goes black, a loud "bang" resounds, and the plinth rocks back and forth. When the image flickers back, cracks appear on the screen.

Mining the basic relationship between video and the viewer, TV Hammer challenges audiences' perception of the video medium by seeming to break the boundary between the virtual realm of video and the physical realm the audience occupies. Furthermore, incorporating a device that responded to sound by rocking the pedestal back and forth, TV Hammer extended to kinetic art and facilitated live interaction between its elements. It also stands as an early instance in which Kim Haemin used humor to hook his audience, a tactic he would employ across several later works.

=== Sindoan (1994) ===
A video installation, Sindoan was named after the area south of Gyeryongsan that was once designated an early capital of the Joseon dynasty. The work presented several video monitors arranged throughout a gallery space (some stand against the walls, others are face-up on the floor). At the center is a brush that stands before an audio speaker, with a video camera recording their interaction. Over the course of work, the brush vibrates with the music emitted by the speaker—a recording of gayageum. The video camera records these movements, which are in turn displayed live upon the various monitors and look like a flickering candle flame.

Sindoan bridges conceptions of the brush as a tool for communication and the candle as a medium between man and the divine in religious and ritual practices. (monograph, 68) It also demonstrates Kim Haemin's early interest in shamanism—particularly in how an artist is akin to the shaman by mediating the real and the imaginary—which he continued to explore across many later works.

=== Unreasonable Alibi (1999) ===
Among Kim's first works to use projection instead of CRT video monitors, Unreasonable Alibi was a video installation of two screens with red and blue lightbulbs suspended between them. Over the course of the work, Kim Haemin appears wearing different costumes, from traditional robes of Confucian scholars and Buddhist monks to a modern-day suit and tie. Over the course of the work, these different versions of the artist appear to interact with each other across the screens and also respond to the lightbulbs that hang between them and turn on or off in concert with the figures' seeming interaction.

Carrying forward Kim's the staging techniques for multiple channels of video and use of light bulbs that Kim explored throughout the 1990s, Unreasonable Alibi staged a conversation of cultural symbolism across its different costumes and its red and blue lights (which allude to the dualities such as yin and yang as well as Korean flags). It also illustrated Kim's deep and longstanding interest in the worldviews that have fundamentally shaped modern-day Korean society. Created in the wake of the IMF crisis in South Korea and just before the turn of the millennium, Unreasonable Alibi is a self portrait of the artist that evokes the broader identity conflicts of its time.

=== 50-second Rendering (2003) ===
Kim Haemin composed 50-second Rendering by clipping television footage of North and South Korean families who reunited upon the 50th anniversary of the 1953 Armistice Agreement. The work stages these clips across two screens, adjoined at a right angle. Rapidly repeated, the clips of the families' emotional gestures of (such as waving or embracing) not only accentuates their effusive-yet-distraught reactions, but also the brevity of their long-awaited reunions. Similarly paradoxical, the work's running time is very short (only 50 seconds) despite the artist's labor-intensive editing process, which is underscored by the installation's soundtrack of what sounds like a whirring hard-drive.
