= Prospect New Orleans =

Contemporary art event

Prospect New Orleans is a multi-venue contemporary art event in New Orleans, Louisiana, USA.

== Prospect.1 ==
"Prospect.1 New Orleans" ran from November 2008 to January 2009. Conceived in the tradition of the international biennials, such as the Venice Biennale, São Paulo Biennial, Istanbul Biennial, it showcased new artistic practices of 81 leading international contemporary artists at over 24 venues across the city of New Orleans, and offered an array of cultural and educational programs for the local community.

Contemporary art curator Dan Cameron conceived of Prospect New Orleans during a visit to the Crescent City in early 2006, just months after Hurricane Katrina. During a public meeting with the New Orleans artists’ community, he witnessed the collective frustration about the slow pace of rebuilding the city, and wanted to help. In January 2007, Cameron founded a new nonprofit, U.S. Biennial, Inc., secured generous seed funding, enlisted the help of a volunteer board of directors, rented office space, and hired staff and consultants to assist him in realizing his vision.

== Prospect.2 ==
According to the press release, "Prospect.2 New Orleans", October 2011 to January 2012 invited 62 artists from around the world to participate in. Prospect.2 was once again curated by David Cameron and showcased the work of leading and emerging contemporary artists from around the globe. Slightly over half of the selected artists are based in the United States, including 10 based in New Orleans. Africa, Asia, Europe, and the Americas will be well-represented, with artists from over 20 nations participating including Sophie Calle, Nick Cave, Nicole Eisenman, An-My Lê as well as New Orleans artists Bruce Davenport Jr., Dawn DeDeaux, and Dan Tagu.

== Prospect.3 ==
"Prospect.3. Notes for Now" took place October 2014 - January 2015 Artists included Los Angeles artist Joe Ray (USA, b. 1944), who was born in Alexandria, Louisiana and his paintings were on view at the Contemporary Arts Center in New Orleans in 2014.

== Prospect.4 ==
Prospect.4, was on view November 2017 - February 2018 and included 73 artists in 17 venues and included Rashid Johnson, Hank Willis Thomas, and Njideka Akunyili Crosby.
