= Video installation =

Contemporary art form

Video installation is a contemporary art form that combines video technology with installation art, making use of all aspects of the surrounding environment to affect the audience. Tracing its origins to the birth of video art in the 1970s, it has increased in popularity as digital video production technology has become more readily accessible. Today, video installation is ubiquitous and visible in a range of environments—from galleries and museums to an expanded field that includes site-specific work in urban or industrial landscapes. Popular formats include monitor work, projection, and performance. The only requirements are electricity and darkness.

One of the main strategies used by video-installation artists is the incorporation of the space as a key element in the narrative structure. This way, the well-known linear cinematic narrative is spread throughout the space creating an immersive ambient. In this situation, the viewer plays an active role as he/she creates the narrative sequence by evolving in the space. Sometimes, the idea of a participatory audience is stretched further in interactive video installation. Some other times, the video is displayed in such a way that the viewer becomes part of the plot as a character in a film.

A pioneer of video installation was Korean/American Nam June Paik whose work from the mid-sixties used multiple television monitors in sculptural arrangements. Paik went on to work with video walls and projectors to create large immersive environments. Wolf Vostell is another pioneer of video installation. He showed his 6 TV Dé-coll/age in 1963 at the Smolin Gallery in New York.

Other Americans include Bill Viola, Gary Hill and Tony Oursler. Bill Viola is considered a master of the medium. His 1997 Survey at the Whitney Museum in NY, along with the 1994-95 Gary Hill survey created by the Henry Art Gallery, Seattle, and traveling to Philadelphia, New York, Los Angeles and Kansas City, amounted to a watershed mark in the history of video installation art marking both a period on the sentence of the first generation and a beginning of the next. Gary Hill, another master of the medium, has created quite complex and innovative video installations using combinations of stripped down monitors, projections and a range of technologies (from laser disk to DVD and new digital devices) so that the spectator can interact with the work. For instance in the 1992 piece Tall Ships, commissioned by Jan Hoet for Documenta 9, the audience enters a dark hall-like space where ghostly images of seated figures are projected onto a wall. The approach of a viewer causes a seated figure to stand up and move forward toward the viewer, creating an eerie effect of the dead in the underworld (rather suggestive of Odysseus' descent into the Underworld in The Odyssey). Tony Oursler's work exploited the technology developed in the early 1990s of very small video projectors that could be built into sculptures and structures as well as improvements in image brightness so that images could be placed on surfaces other than a flat screen.

David Hall and Tony Sinden exhibited the first multi-screen installation in Britain, 60 TV Sets, at Gallery House, London in 1972. Subsequently, British video installation developed a distinctive pattern following the seminal international Video Show at the Serpentine Gallery, London in 1975, and later thanks in part to the existence of regular festivals in Liverpool and Hull and public galleries such as the Museum of Modern Art, Oxford that routinely showcased the work. Sam Taylor-Wood's early installation pieces are good examples where specially filmed elements are shown as a series of serial projections.

== Artists working with video installation ==
- Vito Acconci
- Gustavo Aguerre
- Eija-Liisa Ahtila
- Doug Aitken
- Marsia Alexander-Clarke
- Madeleine Altmann
- Kutlug Ataman
- Matthew Barney
- Sylvie Bélanger
- Bull.Miletic
- Janet Cardiff & George Bures Miller
- Bruce Charlesworth
- Jordi Colomer
- Chris Cunningham
- Heiko Daxl
- Malaka Dewapriya
- Fred Forest
- Ingeborg Fülepp
- Frank Gillette
- Douglas Gordon
- Sigurður Guðjónsson
- Dan Graham
- David Hall
- Richard Hambleton
- Gary Hill
- Teresa Hubbard / Alexander Birchler
- Pierre Huyghe
- Runa Islam
- Amy Jenkins (artist)
- Joan Jonas
- Mike Kelley
- Kim Haemin
- Lennie Lee
- Gabriel Lester
- Katja Loher
- Anthony McCall
- Antoni Muntadas
- Bruce Nauman
- Dennis Oppenheim
- Valerio Rocco Orlando
- Tony Oursler
- Nam June Paik
- Slobodan Pajic
- Park Hyun-ki
- Philippe Parreno
- Kelly Richardson
- Sophy Rickett
- Pipilotti Rist
- Don Ritter
- David Rokeby
- Martha Rosler
- Stepan Ryabchenko
- Rose Schlossberg
- Lorna Simpson
- Michael Smith
- Jennifer Steinkamp
- Surekha
- Eve Sussman
- System D-128
- Diana Thater
- Steina and Woody Vasulka
- Bill Viola
- Minnette Vári
- Wolf Vostell
- Gillian Wearing
- Apichatpong Weerasethakul
- Robert Wegman
- Roger Welch
- Yeastculture

== See also ==
- Video Art
