= Yeast Culture (company) =

English media company

- Company type: Film making, animation and digital media
- Industry: Arts and Media
- Founded: 1999
- Headquarters: Camden
- Products: Documentary, drama, video installation, animation, dance, live VJing
- Website: yeastculture.org

Yeast Culture, sometimes spelt yeastCulture is a company engaged in film making and digital media, based in Camden, London. The company was started in 1999 by directors Nick Hillel and Marc Silver. Silver left the company in 2005 but Hillel remains as creative director and is supported by a team of film-makers, visual artists and animators. It embraces many diverse disciplines including documentary, drama, video installation, animation, dance, live VJing and touring exhibitions.

Yeast Culture shot and edited four, one-hour documentaries for Channel 4 and BBC 2; Naked Protest, Burning Man – Community or Kaos, Global Protest – The Battle of Prague and Big Chill in Cairo (1999).

Among their other clients have been work for Nitin Sawhney, Courtney Pine, Jamie Cullum, The Philharmonia Orchestra, Beastie Boys, Brian Eno, Michael Nyman, Dennis Rollins, Baaba Maal, the V & A, Serious, The British Council, Matthew Herbert, The Philharmonia Orchestra, Akram Khan and the National Film Theatre.
