= Byron Kim =

American painter (born 1961)

Byron Kim (born in 1961 in La Jolla, California) is an American contemporary artist. He is Korean American, and lives and works in Brooklyn, New York. In the early 1990s he produced minimalist paintings exploring racial identity. He graduated from Yale University in 1983 where he was a member of Manuscript Society.

== Works ==
Kim's work in the early 1990s consisted of monochrome canvases depicting the skin tones of friends and family. He gained early recognition for Synecdoche, his contribution to the 1993 Whitney Biennial. Synecdoche (1991–1992) is a grid of 400 small, monochromatic paintings. Each panel recreates the skin color of an individual who sat for Kim while he painted their portrait.

These monochrome canvases were followed by two or three-zoned canvases that color-sampled objects, sites, or people. Kim collaborated with artist Glenn Ligon on Black & White (1993), part of a series critiquing the prejudices of art materials, specifically the hues of "flesh"-colored tubes of paint. 46 Halsey Drive Wallingford CT (1995) records his family members' recollections of the color of a home Kim lived in as a child.

Kim also paints landscapes and makes photographic assemblages.

His work is in the permanent collection of the National Gallery of Art in Washington, DC.
