= Katja Loher =

Swiss visual artist (born 1979)

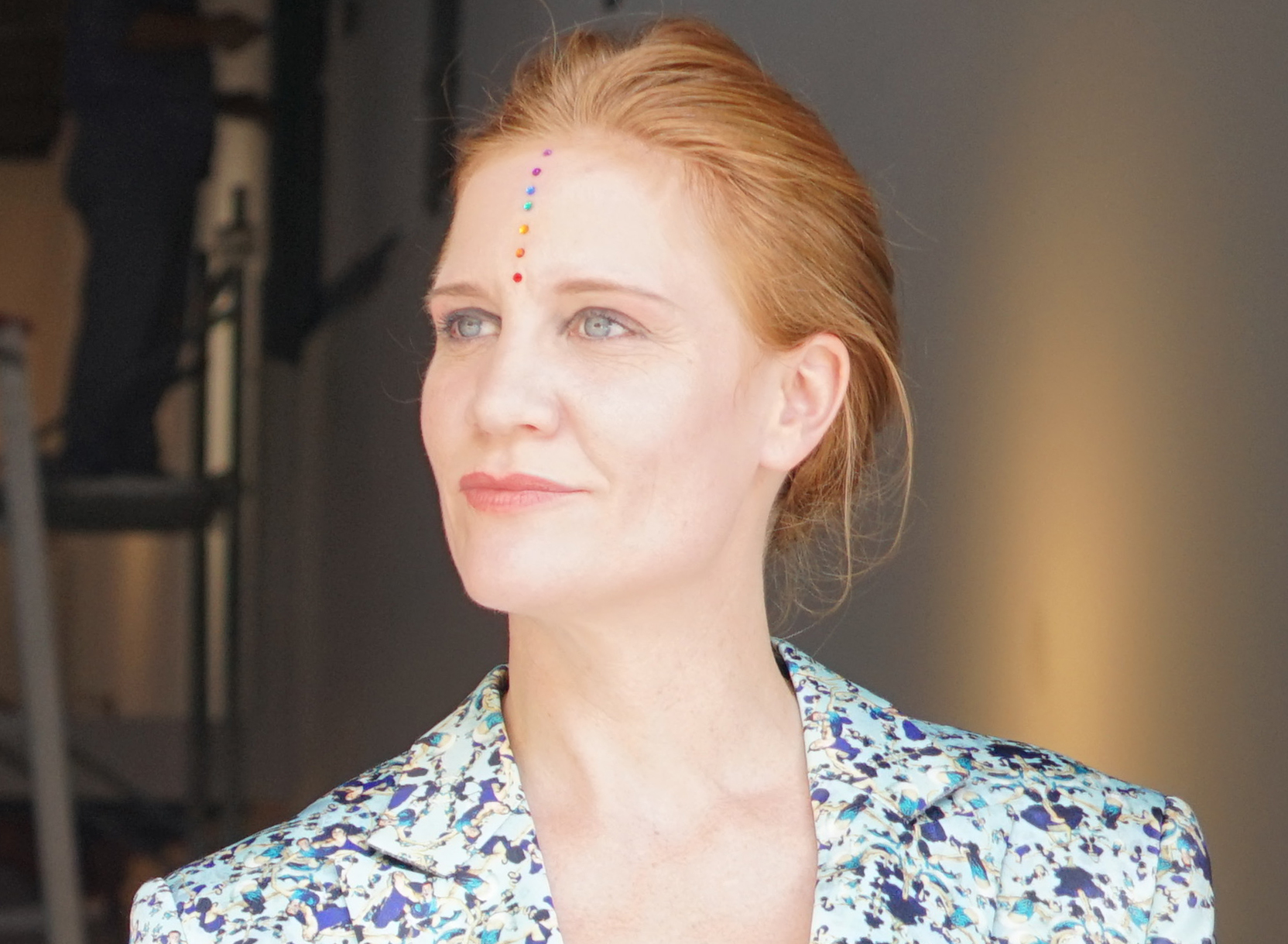
Katja Loher

Katja Loher (born 1979) is a Swiss visual artist, known for her video sculptures and installations. She often integrates organic, planetary, and moving choreographic elements into panoramic aerial perspectives. Her pieces are considered by critics as evocative of alternative dimensions where past, present, and future converge. Her works have been shown in art museums in many countries including Italy, Russia, China, and the US. Her art is also represented in the collections of institutions like Swissgrid AG, Perth Concert Hall Museum, and the New Britain Museum of American Art. Loher was born in Zurich in 1979.

== Education ==
Loher attended the École Supérieure des Beaux-Arts in Geneva (2000–2001), and the Hochschule für Gestaltung und Kunst in Basel, (2001–2004), where she respectively obtained a Bachelor of Arts and Diploma degrees in Art.

== Career ==
A year after finishing her studies, she participated as a collective exhibitor in the First Moscow Biennale of Contemporary Art (2005). Five years later, she exhibited her artwork in galleries in Rome, Zurich, Naples, Tel Aviv, and São Paulo. In 2013, Loher made her solo premiere in New York City at the C24 Gallery, where she also presented further solo shows in 2014, 2016 and 2018. Consecutive solo exhibitions of Loher's art have been held between 2013 and 2020 at the Anya Tish Gallery in Houston, TX, as well as at the Andres Thalmann Gallery, Zurich, Switzerland between 2013 and 2018.

Museums where Loher's artwork has been exhibited include: Kunsthalle Palazzo (Basel, 2007), MAXXI Museum (Rome 2010), Haus für Kunst Uri (2013), Figge Art Museum (Davenport, IA, US, 2014), Telfair Museum (Savannah, GA, US, 2015), State Hermitage Museum (St.Petersburg, Russia 2005), Today Art Museum (Beijing, China 2016), Bruce Museum (Greenwich, CT, US, 2017), Long Museum (Shanghai, China 2014), San Jose Museum of Art (San Jose, CA, US, 2014), and New Britain Museum of American Art (New Britain, CT, US, 2015).

Loher's audiovisual installations have been also displayed in many open air sites and festivals around the world, among them the Dublin Fringe Festival in 2006, the SURGE for the 798 Arts Festival 2007 in Beijing, The Prague Contemporary Art Festival in 2010, the Brooklyn Academy of Music Next Wave Festival in 2014, the PULSE Festival (Savannah, GA) in 2015, the India Art Fair (Swiss Embassy, New Delhi, 2018), and the Nou Le Morne Festival (Mauritius (2019).

Among awards, in 2004 Loher received the CreaTVty Award for new media from the TV Productioncenter Zürich; in 2008, she was granted a six-month Artist Residence in Berlin by the Cultural Department of her hometown Schaffhausen, and in 2010 she received the second Art Credit Award from the city of Basel.

Loher's oeuvre has been reviewed in art sources and newspapers, and is covered in a multi-volume book series published by Gallery Andres Thalmann.

== Works ==
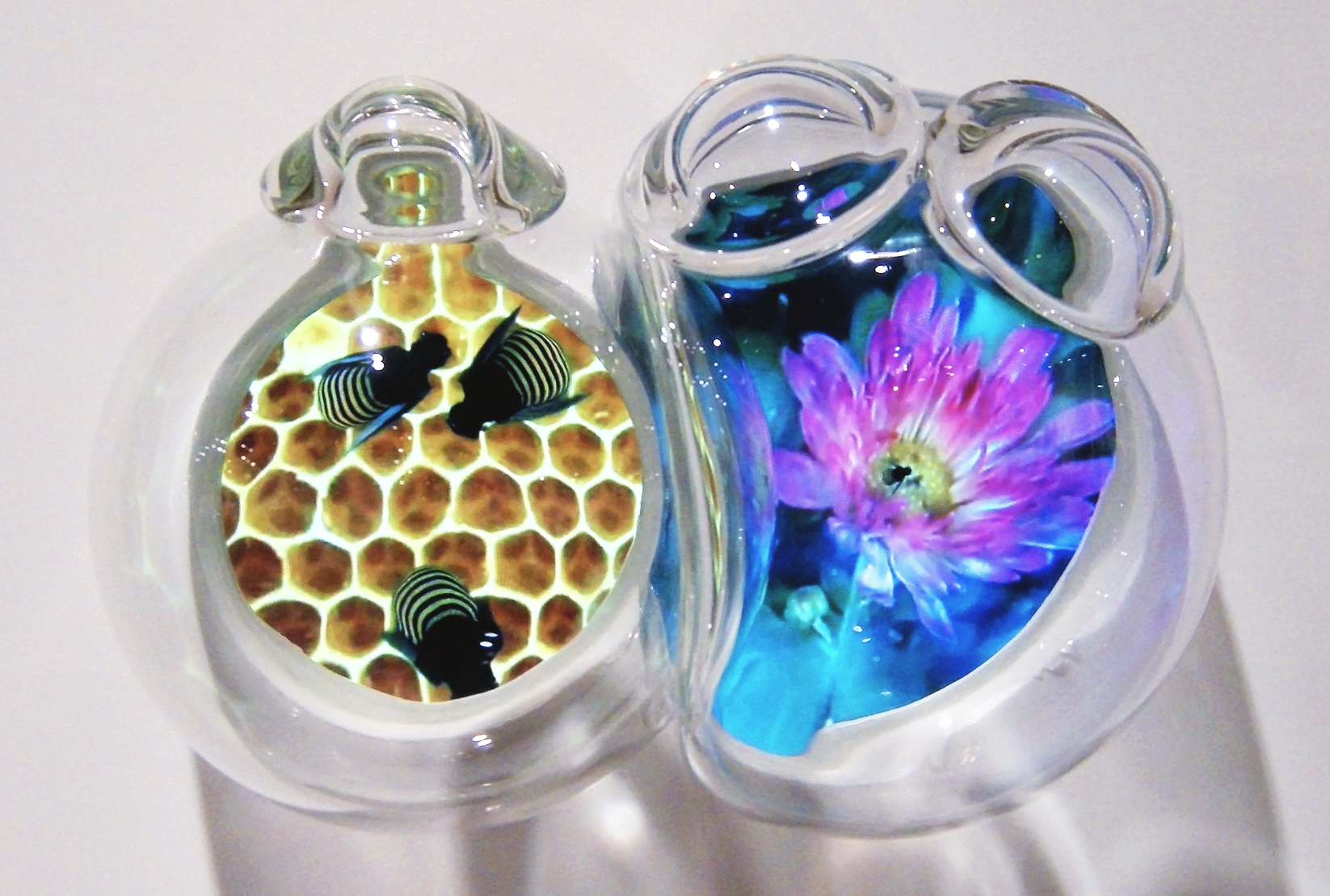
Beebubble, glass artwork by Katja Loher

Some of Loher's art installations in recent years have been:

- 2010 Bubbles - premiered at Andres Thalmann Gallery in Zurich, an installation based on soap bubble-like glass pieces on whose interior 3D video images were projected, showing luminously dressed, miniature dancers recorded from above, displaying kaleidoscopic patterns and ornaments, accompanied by poetic texts inspired by Chilean poet Pablo Neruda.
- 2012 Timebubble - premiered in New York, it features American composer and pianist Philip Glass as the master of time. This video-sculpture shows on one side dancers imitating the mechanized movements of a clock's various components that, like the sections of the orchestra, follow the direction of the composer. On the other side, a maze-like area is inhabited by creatures whose movements create positive and negative space.
- 2014 Bang Bang - shown at C24 Gallery in Chelsea, the installation consisting of choreographic video projections of costumed dancers in synchronized Busby Berkeley-style viewed from atop, accompanied by humorous or abstract existential questions.
- 2014 Videoplanet-Orchestra - shown at Figge Art Museum and C24 Gallery, video projections of performance art, music, and dance on hanging orbs, with interrogative elements addressing the balance between humans, nature and technology.

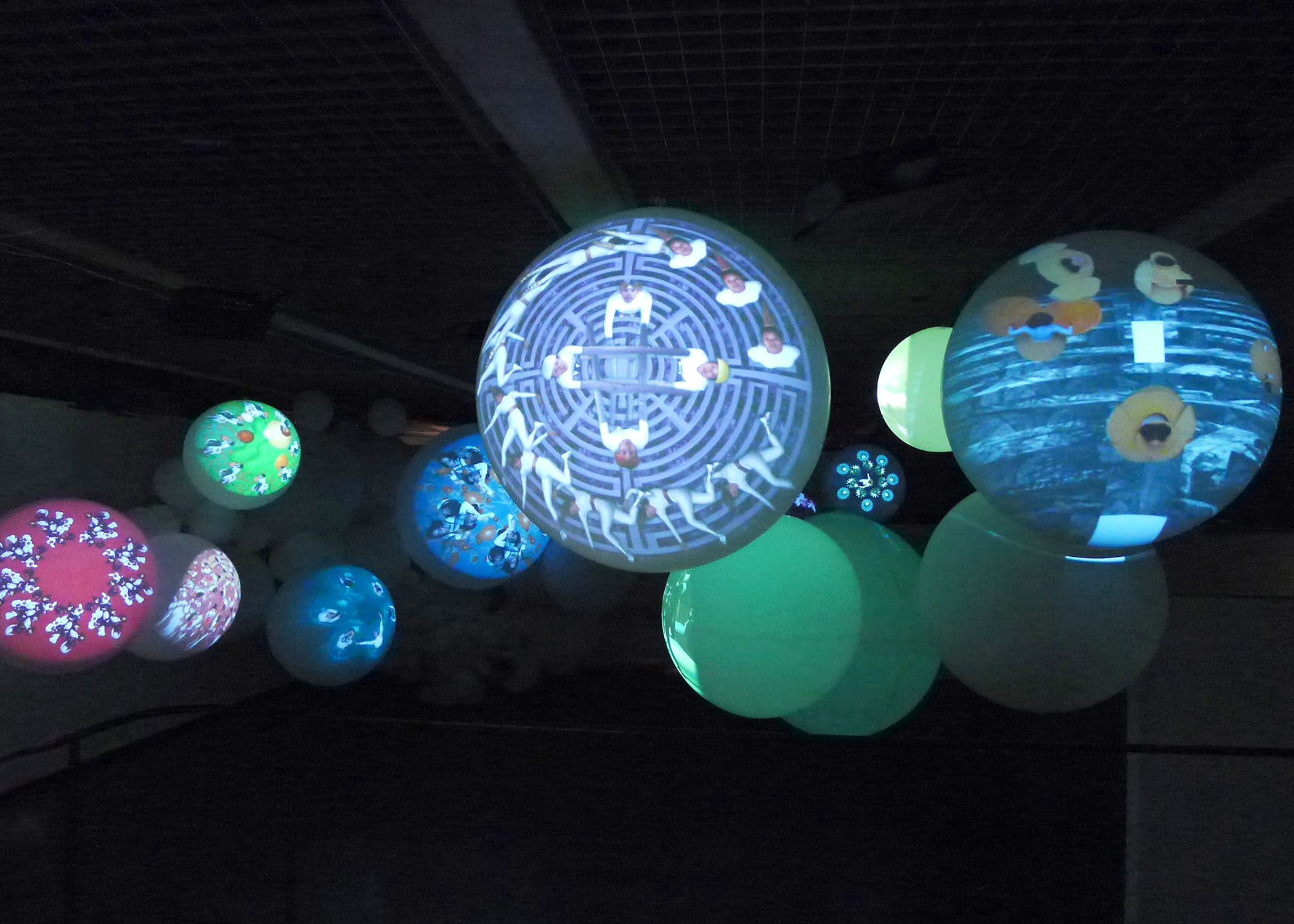
Videoplanets by Kaja Loher

- 2015 Beeplanet - shown at the Jepson Center for the Arts (Savannah, GA), showed hand-blown glass orbs as screens to watch environmentally-conscious videos.
- 2016 Vuela Vuela - shown at C24 Gallery in Chelsea, glass bubbles and rainforest resources were combined with projections of surreal creature choreographies that explored the four elements of nature, invoking the healer, his medicine and his plants.
- 2018 Where Does The Rainbow End? - permanently installed at the Swissgrid headquarters (Aarau), a seven-section video line where ant figures move along the elements of nature (water, earth, air, and fire) and then onwards into "dreams", inviting the viewer to philosophical questions contrasting against a technically complex working environment.
- 2019 Seeds of Life - produced at The House Collective, and presented at their sites in Hong Kong, Chengdu, Beijing and Shanghai (China), where Loher joined with Feng Shui designer Thierry Chow, fashion Designers Dirty Pineapple, Chinese ink painter Wu Hao and local creatives for large scale site-specific productions exploring the five traditional Chinese elements of nature (wood, fire, earth, metal, and water), integrating audiovisual resources and local traditions to bring together past, present, and future projected on kaleidoscopic video 'globes' in counterpoint to traditional architectural surroundings.
- 2020 What happens to the swallows that are late for spring? - exhibited at the Anya Tish Gallery, intricate images are projected onto large floating spheres and glass bubbles encased in bird nests, to show a universe of exotic planets where creatures, landscapes and textures harmonize, questioning the individual's role in the greater universe.
- 2021 Plankton Manifesto - premiered in Old Town Zurich, a video-sculpture made of flowing, luminous shapes allusive of sea plankton and its ecological value, accompanied by music, dancing, costumes and voices.
