= Ekaterina Panikanova =

Russian painter

Ekaterina Panikanova (born 1975 Saint Petersburg, Russia; resides in Italy) is a Russian surreal artist. She is known for her large installations of ink drawings, which she paints across the pages of vintage books. Reception for her work has been positive. In 2015, the Dutch wallpaper company NLXL licensed Panikanova's paintings to create a wallpaper.

== Education ==
Panikanova graduated from the Academy of Fine Arts of St. Petersburg.

== Bibliography ==
- 1, 2, 3, Fuoco. Mostra Personale di Ekaterina Panikanova (2013)
