= Hale Tenger =

Turkish artist (born 1960)

Hale Tenger (born 1960) is a visual artist based in Istanbul. She is known for her large-scale installations that explore identity, collective memory, and political violence.

Using sculpture, video, and sound, her work has been exhibited at numerous public institutions, including Arthur M. Sackler Gallery, Smithsonian Institution, Washington DC.; Martin-Gropius-Bau and Kunst-Werke, Berlin; Kunstmuseum Bonn, Bonn; Fridericianum, Kassel; New Museum, New York; Witte de With Center for Contemporary Art and Museum Boijmans Van Beuningen, Rotterdam; Palais des Beaux-Arts de Lille, Lille; Carré d'Art-Nimes Museum of Contemporary Art, Nimes; Thyssen-Bornemisza Art Contemporary, Vienna; Seoul Museum of Art, Seoul; Van Abbemuseum, Eindhoven; ZKM, Karlsruhe; Centre d'Art Contemporain Genève, Geneva; Nikolaj Contemporary Art Center, Copenhagen; Museum voor Moderne Kunst Arnhem, Arnhem; Istanbul Modern and ARTER, Istanbul.

== Early life and education ==
Tenger was born in 1960 in İzmir. She received an AA in Computer Programming from Bogazici University in Istanbul in 1981. After her undergraduate studies, she enrolled into Istanbul State Academy of Fine Arts where she obtained an MFA in 1986. The same year, she received a British Council Award and enrolled in the South Glamorgan Institute of Higher Education, Cardiff to receive another MFA in 1988. For both of her MFAs, she focused on ceramics. After her education, she started experimenting with bronze casting and welding. Tenger was an artist-in-residence at the New York State College of Ceramics at the Alfred University in 1994. She participated in the residency of Artpace in San Antonio in 1997.

== Selected works ==
The School of Sikimden Aşşa Kasımpaşa (The School of I don’t give a fuck anymore) (1990) is an installation with a large-scale galvanized iron pool filled with red-dyed liquid, placed underneath a set of Ottoman-era scimitars suspended from the ceiling. The work refers to the 1990 assassination of the academic and women's rights activist Bahriye Üçok, while suggesting a critique of Turkey's neo-Ottomanist tendencies, militarized nationalism, and religious devotion. It was most recently exhibited at Dream and Reality: Modern and Contemporary Women Artists From Turkey, organized at Istanbul Modern in 2012.

I Know People Like This (1992) is a wall installation with small found objects, including figures of god of fertility and Three Monkeys of See No Evil Hear No Evil, which evokes the elements of the Turkish flag. Following the exhibition of the work at the 3rd Istanbul Biennial curated by Vasıf Kortun in 1992, the artist was prosecuted for denigrating the Turkish flag. The defense argued that the artwork did not refer to the Turkish flag, and instead criticized patriarchy and male violence. Tenger was acquitted but has not shown the work in Turkey since 1992.

Produced in collaboration with the musician Serdar Ateşer, Decent Deathwatch: Bosnia-Herzegovina (1993) is an installation with 800 water-filled glass jars that feature images and texts about Bosnia, drawn from the international media. Placed on metal shelves, the water-filled jars create a laboratory-like setting that explores isolation and archiving at the same time.

We didn't go outside; we were always on the outside/We didn't go inside; we were always on the inside (1995) is an installation work that consists of a wooden hut, a guard booth surrounded by a barbed wire. This is a work she created for the fourth Istanbul Biennial curated by Rene Block in 1995. In the installation, the militaristic environment is juxtaposed with romantic landscape photographs and music coming from the radio placed in the hut, evoking a sense of confinement and isolation. The work offers "a memorial combining privacy with a sense of loss and entrapment." In 2015—twenty years after its first exhibition—the work was restaged in the basement of a historic building in New York, organized by Protocinema, a nonprofit arts organization based in Istanbul and New York.

The Closet (1997) is a three-room installation where the artist recreates a domestic setting against a background of the 1980s Turkey under a military dictatorship. Darkened with thick curtains, a dining room features a radio that narrates a football match and a news broadcast; a bedroom hosts a desk and schoolbooks of the period; and a closet presents a stack of vintage clothing. Suggesting a sense of disappearance, the piece creates the claustrophobic feeling of a particular era ridden by violence and fear. The installation was recreated for the exhibition How Did We Get Here (2015) at SALT Galata in Istanbul.

Beirut (2005–07) is a video work showing the facade of the Saint-Georges Hotel in Beirut—an abandoned building that was severely damaged during the civil war in Lebanon. The work depicts the movement of white fabrics floating at the windows, placed for a protest against the delay of renovation permission.

Produced in collaboration with the musician Serdar Ateşer—Tenger's long-term collaborator—Balloons on the Sea (2011) is a video piece that features balloons floating on the water, ready for a pastime activity of shooting. The work explores the latent violence while suggesting an act of resilience. The work was exhibited at the International Exhibition at the Biennale di Venezia in 2017, curated by Christine Macel.

I Know People Like This III (2013) is an installation that takes the form of a maze, where the walls feature images of mass street protests, police arresting people, devastation, and anger—all printed on x-ray film shown against light-box panels. The display of the archive suggests a look through the insides of a political body with illness.

Commissioned by Alserkal Programming in Dubai, Under (2018) is a public art installation where viewers walk in to a free-standing structure that hosts a tree with a net. The work refers to a traditional hunting trick, using nets to get birds accustomed to fly lower.

== Exhibitions ==
Tenger had her first solo exhibition at the Galeri Nev Istanbul in 1990. Her solo exhibitions include Where the Winds Rest, Galeri Nev, Istanbul (2019); We didn't go outside; we were always on the outside/ We didn't go inside; we were always on the inside, Protocinema, New York (2015); Swinging on the Stars, Galeri Nev, Istanbul (2013); Perspectives: Beirut, Smithsonian Institution, Washington (2011); Balloons on the Sea, Green Art Gallery, Dubai (2011); Never Never Land, Mannheimer Kuntsverein, Mannheim (2001); and The Closet, ArtPace, San Antonio, Texas (1997).

Her work has been featured at international institutions, including Centre Pompidou, Paris; Art Gallery of Western Australia; Arter, Istanbul; Neuer Berliner Kunsverein, Berlin; Boghossian Foundation, Villa Empain, Brussels; Istanbul Modern, Istanbul; Espace Culturel Louis Vuitton, Paris; Museum Boijmans Van Beuningen, Rotterdam; Thyssen-Bornemisza Art Contemporary, Vienna; Martin-Gropius-Bau, Berlin; Seoul Museum of Art, Seoul; Palais des Beaux-Arts de Lille, Lille; Carré d'Art-Nîmes Museum of Contemporary Art, Nîmes; Museum voor Moderne Kunst Arnhem, Arnhem; Van Abbemuseum, Eindhoven; Protocinema, New York; and New Museum, New York.

She participated in various biennials such as the 57th International Art Exhibition, Venice Biennale (2017); the 1st Haifa Mediterranean Biennial (2010); the 8th Havana Biennial (2003); Gwangju Biennale (2000); 2nd Johannesburg Biennial (1998); Manifesta 1, Rotterdam (1996); São Paulo Art Biennial (1994); the 3rd and 4th Istanbul Biennial (1992 and 1995).

== Collections ==
Tenger's work is part of public collections including:

- ARTER, Istanbul
- Art Gallery of Western Australia
- Centre Pompidou
- Istanbul Modern
- Linda Pace Foundation, San Antonio
- Museum Arnhem
- N. Eczacıbaşı Foundation
- Vehbi Koç Foundation
