= Carl Robert Pope =

Photo and video artist

Carl Robert Pope, Jr.
- Born: 1961 (age 64–65); Indianapolis, Indiana
- Education: Southern Illinois University
- Known for: photography, video
- Awards: Art Matters (2015)

Carl Robert Pope, Jr. is an artist, working primarily in the mediums of photography and video. His work address issues related to race in America, specifically the social conditions of African Americans. He has also made artworks that address the AIDS epidemic and other social and political issues in the US.

“We understand photography through advertising and through photojournalism, but the enriching way is the way that people take pictures of the people they love."

"I am dealing with the unconscious in that I don’t think about what I shoot, I just react to what I see. But I am only reacting to what I see and my thoughts about what I want to see. Before I go shoot I have made up my mind about some of the things I am interested in and what I hope to do. Then when I go out and shoot I have already programmed myself about some of the things I am interested in, but I leave myself open to see what happens. Later I think about what it is I have just seen and photographed and experienced."

“It will not be material assets,” he adds, “that will support us in the unknowable future we are about to face. It will be our ability to make innovative choices that will give us real stability and duration in our evolution as humans at this moment in history.”

== Personal life ==
Pope was born in 1961 in Indianapolis, Indiana,. He has a twin sister, named Karen.

Pope earned a Bachelor of Arts Degree in Cinema and Photography from Southern Illinois University.

== Exhibitions ==
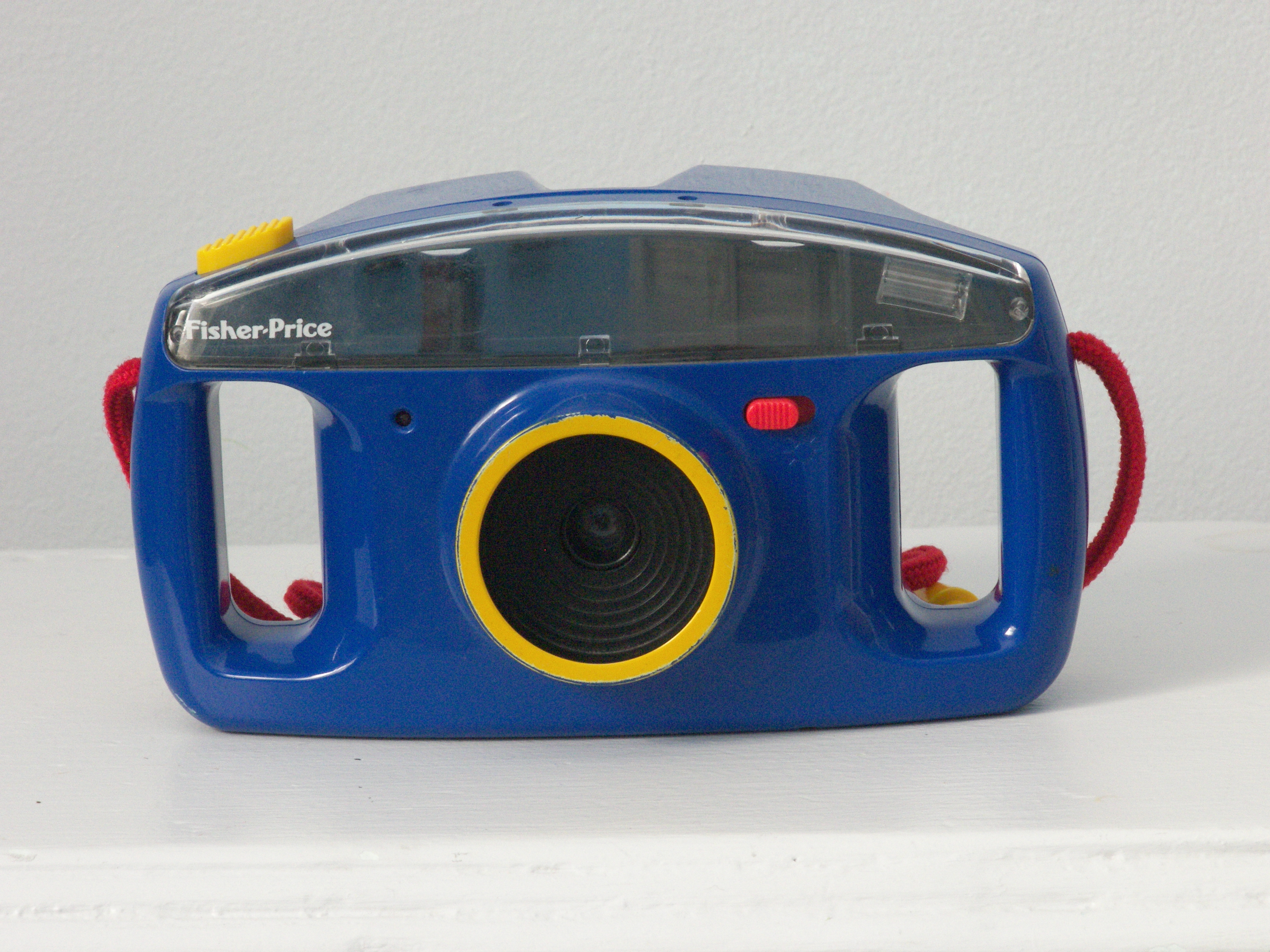
Fisher-Price toy camera

Toy Camera is a project that began in 1982. He began to photograph the black community in Carbondale, Illinois. He used a toy camera because it was less threatening to his subjects. The pictures have a homemade, worn look. They depict the life of poverty in the black community in Carbondale. The photographs were hand colored gelatin silver prints.

In 1999, Pope had an exhibition in Hartford, Connecticut called Palimpsest. In this video installation, “Pope posits his body and consciousness as the embodiment of society’s negative assumptions about race, gender and identity in all of its complexities”. The exhibition consisted of a video installation on a wall, with wall text written by his twin sister, Karen. The video showed Pope’s body being altered in ways to highlight how race is perceived as an intrinsic trait, rather than a superficial one. His body is intrinsic to the work. In fact, in the last segment of the video, Pope has a poem written by his sister tattooed across his entire body.

In 2000, Pope created a series of prints named Untitled. The prints contain quotes that are loosely related. One reads, "Tragedy over time equals comedy!"

== Artwork ==
- The New Georgia State Flag Project in 1994
- Men Women and Children in 1990
- Catharsis: A Ten Year Survey in 1991
- Some of the Greatest Hits of The New York City Police Department in 1994
- Silent Wishes, Unconscious Dreams, and Prayers… Fulfilled was a public piece commissioned in 1996. It consists of 17 slabs of brownstone, engraved with quotations of Hartford, Connecticut youth who died of domestic or gang violence, drug abuse, or AIDS.
- The Bad Air Smelled of Roses in 2006, Tennessee State University in 2010, Cleveland Institute of Art in 2018
- Clarity as Concept: A Poet’s Perspective in 2017, Located in the main Tube Factory gallery space, the exhibit was a co-curatorial project between Mari Evans, Carl Pope and Shauta Marsh. It consists of a commissioned installation piece by artist Carl Pope related to Evans’s photos, poetry and book of essays, “Clarity as Concept: A Poet’s Perspective.”
- Nashville Visionaries in 2019 at Tennessee State University

== Awards ==
Art Matters (2015)

== Selected collections ==
- Minneapolis Institute of Art, Minneapolis, Minnesota
- Whitney Museum of American Art, New York
