= Glenn Ligon =

American conceptual artist (born 1960)

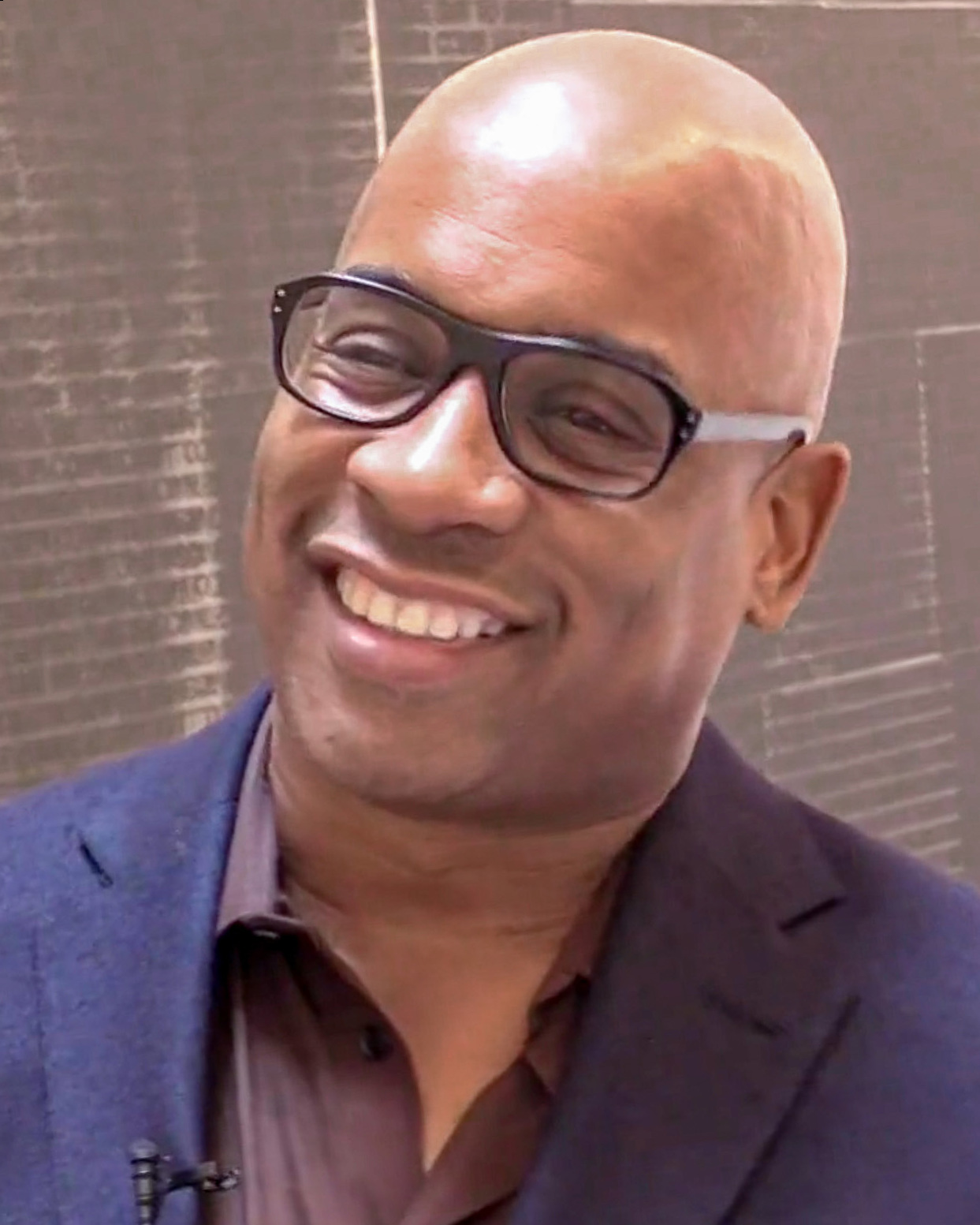
- Ligon in 2014
- Born: 1960 (age 65–66); Morrisania, Bronx, New York City, U.S.
- Education: Wesleyan University
- Known for: Conceptual art

Glenn Ligon (born 1960, pronounced Lie-gōne) is an American conceptual artist whose work explores race, language, desire, sexuality, and identity. Based in New York City, Ligon's work often draws on 20th century literature and speech of 20th century cultural figures such as James Baldwin, Zora Neale Hurston, Gertrude Stein, Jean Genet, and Richard Pryor. He is noted as one of the originators of the term Post-Blackness.

== Early life and career ==
Ligon was born in 1960 in the Forest Houses Projects in the south Morrisania, Bronx. When he was seven, his divorced, working-class parents were able to get scholarships for him and his older brother to attend Walden School, a high-quality, progressive, private school on Manhattan's Upper West Side. Ligon enrolled at the Rhode Island School of Design, where he spent two years before transferring to Wesleyan University. He graduated from Wesleyan with a B.A. in 1982.

After graduating, he worked as a proofreader for a law firm, while in his spare time he painted, working in the abstract Expressionist style of Willem de Kooning and Jackson Pollock. In 1985, he participated in the Whitney Museum of American Art's Independent Study Program. He continues to live and work in New York City.

While he started his career as an abstract painter, he began to introduce text and words into his work during the mid-1980s in order to better express his political concerns and ideas about racial identity. Most of the text that he used came from prominent African-American writers (James Baldwin, Zora Neale Hurston, and Ralph Ellison).

Ligon gained prominence in the early 1990s, along with a generation of artists including Janine Antoni, Renée Green, Marlon Riggs, Gary Simmons, and Lorna Simpson.

== Personal life ==
Ligon lives in Tribeca. He has served on the board of directors of the Foundation for Contemporary Arts (FCA). He currently serves on the Board of directors for the Robert Rauschenberg Foundation, The Pulitzer Foundation, and LAXART. His Brooklyn studio is near where artist friends Paul Ramirez Jonas and Byron Kim also work.

== Work ==
Ligon works in multiple media, including painting, neon, video, and photography-based works. His work is greatly informed by his experiences as a gay African American man living in the United States.

=== Text-based Works ===
Untitled (I Am a Man) (1988) at the National Gallery of Art in 2022

Although Ligon's work spans sculptures, prints, drawings, mixed media and neon, painting remains a core activity. He has incorporated texts into his paintings, in the form of literary fragments, jokes, and evocative quotes from a selection of authors, which he stencils directly onto the canvas by hand. These works usually feature a white or grey-toned ground, sometimes tinted with pigment. Ligon uses oil stick to transfer the words onto the surface. His source materials concern issues of the lives of black Americans throughout history.

In 1990, he mounted his first solo show, "How It Feels to Be Colored Me," in Brooklyn. This show established Ligon's reputation for creating large, text-based paintings in which a phrase chosen from literature or other sources is repeated continuously. Smudges and streaks from stenciled text layer until the repeated lines become obscured. Untitled (I Am a Man) (1988), a reinterpretation of the signs carried during the Memphis sanitation strike in 1968 — made famous by Ernest Withers's photographs of the march — is the first example of his use of text. In several other paintings, he overlaps repeating text to a point of illegibility, demanding the viewer's attention as they try to make out the obscured words. Ligon's Prologue Series #2 (1991) includes the opening text of Ralph Ellison's Invisible Man, stenciled in various shades of black and grey, the words becoming less discernible as they progress towards the bottom of the composition. He uses this same passage of text in Prologue Series #5 (1991), but obscures the words further, creating a further sense of abstraction and ambiguity about the subject.

In 1993, Ligon began his series of paintings based on Richard Pryor's groundbreaking stand-up comedy routines from the 1970s.

Stranger#21 (2005), from the Stranger series, at the Rubell Museum DC in 2022

In Ligon's Stranger series, he pursues a career long exploration of paintings based on James Baldwin's 1953 essay Stranger in the Village. This series began in 1996 with selected excepts rendered in Ligon's stenciling technique that gradually reduces the legibility of the text on the canvas. In 2021, Ligon culminates this series by presenting the essay in full in large scale text-based paintings.

Glenn Ligon's Debris Field series began with etchings in 2012. In 2018 he extended this series to paintings. These paintings are also made with stencils but they do not reference pre-existing texts, literature, or speech acts from cultural figures directly. Instead the Debris Field series uses stencils of letterforms that Ligon has created. The letterforms are arranged in all-over compositions on the canvas. Though recognizable as letters, the stenciled shapes also stack and layer on the canvas, furthering Ligon's career long engagement with issues of legibility, and tension between figuration and abstraction.

=== To Disembark (1993) and Runaways (1993) ===
In 1993, Ligon's To Disembark was presented at the Hirshhorn Museum and Sculpture Garden in Washington, D.C. The title references the title of a book of poetry by Gwendolyn Brooks. This show connected the legacy of American slavery to current racial injustices and evoked the recognition that African Americans are still coping with the remnants of slavery and its manifestation in racism. In the titular work of the exhibition Untitled (To Disembark) from 1993, Ligon created a series of packing crates modeled after the one described by ex-slave Henry "Box" Brown in his Narrative of Henry Box Brown who escaped from Slavery Enclosed in a Box 3 Feet Long and 2 Wide. Brown was a slave who escaped slavery by shipping himself from Virginia to freedom in Philadelphia via a box crate. To Disembark the exhibition centers around nine crates that Ligon constructed and dispersed throughout the gallery. Ligon also took note of how Brown was allegedly singing when he arrived in Philadelphia. To incorporate this element, Ligon placed speakers inside the crates quietly playing songs such as "Strange Fruit" sung by Billie Holiday and "Sound of da Police" by KRS-one. Each crate played a different sound, such as a heartbeat, a spiritual, or contemporary rap music. The juxtaposition of all of the songs, spanning a century, is an auditory element which creates a chorus across time, further exposing the lasting effects of slavery. "Strange Fruit" has been used by other black artists such as Hank Willis Thomas in his photography series of the same name.

Runaways (1993) at the National Gallery of Art in 2022

Also included in this exhibition is Runaways (1993) a suite of 10 lithographs. Ligon asked friends to describe him and then included these descriptions as text in a series of posters depicting himself as a runaway slave in the style of 19th-century broadsheets circulated to advertise for the return of fugitive slaves.

In another part of the exhibition, Ligon stenciled four quotes from a 1928 Zora Neale Hurston essay, "How It Feels To Be Colored Me", directly on the walls: "I feel most colored when I am thrown against a sharp white background," "I remember the very day that I became colored," "I am not tragically colored," and "I do not always feel colored." Ligon found Hurston's writing illuminating because she explores the idea of race as a concept that is structured by context rather than essence.

=== Notes on the Margin of the Black Book (1991–1993) ===
In Notes on the Margin of the Black Book (1991–1993), Ligon addresses Robert Mapplethorpe's photographs of black men from his 1996 book titled, Black Book. Ligon cut pages from Black Book and framed 91 photographs, installing them in two horizontal rows. Between them are two more rows of small framed typed texts, 78 comments on sexuality, race, AIDS, art and the controversy over Mapplethorpe's work that was launched by then-Texas Congressman Dick Armey. Ligon explicitly points out the problems of these visuals in Mapplethorpe's book with his row of textual placards between the rows of photographs. These images, because they were first published in Mapplethorpe's book, had a limited scope under which they were viewed. Ligon, however, made these pictures public in presentation, in a museum: Ligon forced viewers to look at these images in a room full of others. This act allows for open discussion of the images and the politics surrounding them.

=== Feast of Scraps (1994–1998) ===
In A Feast of Scraps (1994–1998), he inserted images of black men sourced from pornographic magazines, complete with invented captions ("mother knew," "I fell out" "It's a process") into albums of family snapshots including graduation photographs, vacation snapshots, pictures of baby showers, birthday celebrations, and baptisms. Some of the latter photos include the artist's own family. Photography is used as a way of representing multiple identities through the disruption of images, which expresses the fragmentation of black identity, specifically the artist's own identity. Ligon acknowledges that sexuality is something that is not necessarily visible, so it can be erased in photographs such as photos from his teenage years. The imagery causes the viewer to imagine other aspects of identity and narrative of those depicted in these photographs. This project draws from the secret histories and submerged meanings of inherited texts and images.

=== Coloring book series ===
Another series of large paintings is based on children's coloring on drawings of iconic figures in 1970s black-history coloring books. This series began when Ligon was an artist in residence at the Walker Art Museum in 1999–2000. There he worked with school children to color on the pages of found coloring books. The resulting works are a series of paintings and drawings made with silkscreen and paint on canvas and paper that are renderings of the children's interventions. Figures such as Malcolm X, Harriet Tubman, and Isaac Hayes are depicted in these works.

=== Neons ===
Warm Broad Glow II (2011) at the Whitney Museum in 2011

Since 2005, Ligon has made neon works. Warm Broad Glow (2005), Ligon's first exploration in neon, uses a fragment of text from Three Lives, the 1909 novel by American author Gertrude Stein. Ligon rendered the words "negro sunshine" in warm white neon, the letters of which were then painted black on the front. In 2008, the piece was shown in the Renaissance Society's group exhibit, Black Is, Black Ain't. It was installed in the lobby window of the Whitney Museum in 2011. Other neon works are derived from neon sculptures by Bruce Nauman. One Live and Die (2006) stems from Nauman's 100 Live and Die (1984), for example.

Ligon's large-scale installation A Small Band (2015) consists of three neon pieces illuminating the words "blues," "blood," and "bruise." Commissioned for the facade of the Central Pavilion at the fifty-sixth Venice Biennale, the work has been subsequently arranged in a new, site-specific formation at the Stony Island Arts Bank in Chicago, Illinois, the Pulitzer Arts Foundation in St. Louis, Missouri, and the Virginia Museum of Fine Arts in Richmond, Virginia and on the exterior facade of the New Museum in New York, NY as part of the exhibition Grief and Grievance. The three words of A Small Band reference composer Steve Reich's 1966 sound piece Come Out, which looped a fragment of the recorded testimony of Daniel Hamm, who was one of the Harlem Six, a group of young black men wrongly accused and convicted of murder in the mid-1960s.

Double America (2012) at the National Gallery of Art in 2022

Ligon has created other large-scale installations using neon. Des Parisiens Noirs (2019) is an installation depicting the names of 13 Black models from historic paintings which was presented on an interior facade of the Musée d'Orsay, in Paris. This solo project was presented alongside Black Models: From Géricault to Matisse an exhibition centering the models of African descent whose likenesses are presented in historic paintings and whose biographical details have largely been discovered through archival research. Laure who modeled for Manet's Olympia for example, is one of the thirteen names of black models that Ligon displays in neon. One of the 13 neons included in this work reads "nom inconnu" or name unknown to acknowledge the models whose names have not yet been traced.

In 2021, Ligon was commissioned to create Waiting for the Barbarians for the exhibition Portals organized by the Hellenic Parliament and NEON in the atrium of the former Public Tobacco Factory in Athens, Greece. Waiting for the Barbarians (2021), uses the final two lines of C. P. Cavafy's 1904 poem of the same title. In one translation, these final lines read: "Now what's going to happen to us without barbarians? Those people were a kind of solution." His neon installation consists of nine English translations, each different from the other revealing the variations in the translation's meanings and the othering role that the Barbarians were forced into. With Cavafy's verses, Ligon is addressing cultural supremacy and its dependency on othering relation, but the tense of the lines also suggest a time when othering as a solution has past.

=== The Death of Tom (2008) ===
In 2008, Ligon completed a short film entitled The Death of Tom. It is based on Thomas Edison's 1903 silent film Uncle Tom's Cabin. Playing the character of Tom, Ligon had himself filmed re-creating the last scene of Edison's movie, from which he took his title. But the film was incorrectly loaded in the hand-crank camera that the artist used, so no imagery appeared on film. Embracing this apparent failure, Ligon decided to show his film as an abstract progression of light and shadow with a narrative suggested by the score composed and played by jazz musician Jason Moran.

== Exhibitions ==
In 2011 the Whitney Museum of American Art held a mid-career retrospective of Ligon's work, Glenn Ligon: America, organized by Scott Rothkopf, that traveled to the Los Angeles County Museum of Art and the Modern Art Museum of Fort Worth. Important recent shows include: Grief and Grievance (2021), at the New Museum, where Ligon acted as a curatorial advisor; Des Parisiens Noirs at the Musées d'Orsay, Paris (2019); Blue Black (2017), an exhibition Ligon curated at the Pulitzer Arts Foundation in St. Louis, inspired by the site-specific Ellsworth Kelly wall sculpture; and Glenn Ligon: Encounters and Collisions (2015), a curatorial project organized with Nottingham Contemporary and Tate Liverpool. Ligon has also been the subject of solo museum exhibitions at the Camden Arts Centre in London, the Power Plant in Toronto, the Walker Art Center in Minneapolis, and the Studio Museum in Harlem, among others. His work has been included in major international exhibitions, including the Venice Biennale (2015 and 1997), Berlin Biennal (2014), Istanbul Biennal (2011, 2019), Documenta XI (2002), and Gwangju Biennale (2000).

== Notable works in public collections ==
- Untitled (I Am a Man) (1988), National Gallery of Art, Washington, D.C.
- Backlash, Backlash... (1991), Art Institute of Chicago
- I Feel Most Colored (1992), Blanton Museum of Art, Austin, Texas
- Untitled (1992), Baltimore Museum of Art
- Untitled series (1992), Minneapolis Institute of Art
- Untitled (Black Like Me #2) (1992), Hirshhorn Museum and Sculpture Garden, Smithsonian Institution, Washington, D.C.
- Untitled (I'm Turning Into a Specter before Your Very Eyes and I'm Going to Haunt You) (1992), Philadelphia Museum of Art
- Notes on the Margin of the Black Book (1991–93), Solomon R. Guggenheim Museum, New York
- Black & White (1993), by Glenn Ligon and Byron Kim, Smithsonian American Art Museum, Smithsonian Institution, Washington, D.C.
- Runaways series (1993), Addison Gallery of American Art, Andover, Massachusetts; Amon Carter Museum of American Art, Fort Worth, Texas; Birmingham Museum of Art, Alabama; The Broad, Los Angeles; Harvard Art Museums, Cambridge, Massachusetts; Metropolitan Museum of Art, New York; Mildred Lane Kemper Art Museum, St. Louis; Museum of Contemporary Art, Chicago; Museum of Modern Art, New York; National Gallery of Art, Washington, D.C.; Rhode Island School of Design Museum, Providence; St. Louis Art Museum; Tang Teaching Museum and Art Gallery, Saratoga Springs, New York; and Whitney Museum, New York
- White #15 (1994), Wadsworth Atheneum, Hartford, Connecticut
- Condition Report (2000), Tate, London
- Malcolm X, Sun, Frederick Douglass, Boy with Bubbles (version 2) #1 (2000), Walker Art Center, Minneapolis
- Self-Portrait at Eleven Years Old (2004), Museum of Modern Art, New York
- Untitled (If I Can't Have Love I'll Take Sunshine) (2006), Warwick Arts Centre, Coventry
- Rückenfigur (2009), Los Angeles County Museum of Art and Whitney Museum, New York
- Warm Broad Glow II (2011), Glenstone, Potomac, Maryland and Whitney Museum, New York
- Double America (2012), National Gallery of Art, Washington, D.C.
- Stranger #56 (2012), Musée National d'Art Moderne, Centre Pompidou, Paris
- Live (2014), Crystal Bridges Museum of American Art, Bentonville, Arkansas, and National Portrait Gallery, Smithsonian Institution, Washington, D.C. (jointly owned); and San Francisco Museum of Modern Art

In 2012, Ligon was commissioned to create the first site-specific artwork for the New School's University Center building, designed by Skidmore, Owings & Merrill, on the corner of 14th Street and Fifth Avenue in Greenwich Village. The work, For Comrades and Lovers (2015), features about 400 feet of text from Walt Whitman's Leaves of Grass rendered in violet neon light, running around the top of a wall in the center's first-floor café.

== Recognition ==
In 2003, Ligon was awarded a John Simon Guggenheim Memorial Foundation Fellowship. In 2005, he won an Alphonse Fletcher Foundation Fellowship for his art work. In 2006 he was awarded the Skowhegan Medal for Painting. In 2009, he received the Studio Museum's Joyce Alexander Wein Artist Prize. In 2010, he won a United States Artists Fellow award.

In 2009, President Barack Obama added Ligon's 1992 Black Like Me No. 2, on loan from the Hirshhorn Museum and Sculpture Garden, to the White House collection, where it was installed in the President's private living quarters. The text in the selected painting is from John Howard Griffin's 1961 memoir Black Like Me, the account of a white man's experiences traveling through the South after he had his skin artificially darkened. The words "All traces of the Griffin I had been were wiped from existence" are repeated in capital letters that progressively overlap until they coalesce as a field of black paint. At the annual Gala in the Garden at the Hammer Museum in 2018, he was honored by attorney and social justice advocate Bryan Stevenson.

In 2018, Ligon was awarded an Honorary Doctorate from The New School.

In 2021, Ligon was elected as a member of the American Academy of Arts and Letters.

== Art market ==
Ligon is represented by Hauser & Wirth in New York, Regen Projects in Los Angeles, Thomas Dane Gallery in London, and Chantal Crousel in Paris.

== See also ==
- African-American art
- African-American literature
- Conceptual art
- Glenn Ligon at the Minneapolis Institute of Art, Minneapolis, MN
