= Closing =

Closing may refer to:

== Business and law ==
- Closing (law), a closing argument, a summation
- Closing (real estate), the final step in executing a real estate transaction
- Closing (sales), the process of making a sale
- Closing a business, the process by which an organization ceases operations

== Computing ==
- Closing (morphology), in image processing
- Finalize (optical discs), the optional last step in the authoring process
- CLOSING, a TCP connection state

== Other uses ==
- Closing a letter or e-mail (see valediction)
- "Closing", a song by Enter Shikari from the album Take to the Skies

== See also ==
- Closing argument
- Closing Bell, CNBC television programs
- Closing credits
- Closing statement (disambiguation)
- Closing time (disambiguation)
- Close (disambiguation)
- Closed (disambiguation)
- Closure (disambiguation)
- Conclusion (disambiguation)
