= Close =

Close may refer to:

== Music ==
- Close (Kim Wilde album), 1988
- Close (Marvin Sapp album), 2017
- Close (Sean Bonniwell album), 1969
- "Close" (Sub Focus song), 2014
- "Close" (Nick Jonas song), 2016
- "Close" (Rae Sremmurd song), 2018
- "Close" (Jade Eagleson song), 2020
- "Close (to the Edit)", a 1984 song by Art of Noise
- "Close", song by Aaron Lines from Living Out Loud
- "Close", song by AB6IX from Mo' Complete: Have A Dream
- "Close", song by Drumsound & Bassline Smith from Wall of Sound
- "Close", song by Rascal Flatts from Unstoppable
- "Close", song by Soul Asylum from Candy from a Stranger
- "Close", song by Westlife from Coast to Coast
- "Close", song by French electronic group Telepopmusik and English vocalist Deborah Anderson, from their album Angel Milk

== Other uses ==
- Close area of land, Archaic English legal term for an area of private land enclosed by a hedge or wall, typically adjacent to an English manor or farmhouse, and distinct from otherwise surrounding medieval Open-field system common land
- Close (surname)
- Cathedral close, the area surrounding a cathedral, typically occupied by buildings associated with it
- Close (2019 film), an action thriller
- Close (2022 film), a Belgian drama film
- Close (street), an alley or cul-de-sac
- Close, old English term for an estate
- Close, a common stair or entryway in a Scottish tenement
- Close (system call), a system call in computer software
- Close, a character in Go! Princess PreCure
- Clifton College Close Ground, a cricket ground in Bristol known as "The Close"

== See also ==
- Clos (disambiguation)
- Closed (disambiguation)
- Closing (disambiguation)
- Klos (disambiguation)
- Klose, a surname
