= Natalie Westbrook =

American multimedia artist

- Born: Louisville, Kentucky
- Citizenship: United States
- Education: Cooper Union (BFA, 2002), Yale University School of Art (MFA, 2010), University of Louisville (MA, 2004)
- Occupation: Artist
- Years active: 2009-present
- Known for: Contemporary Art
- Website: nataliewestbrook.com

Natalie Westbrook (born 1980) is a multimedia artist whose work spans painting, drawing, printmaking and sculpture.

== Education and work ==
Westbrook was born in Louisville, Kentucky. She received an MFA in Painting from Yale University School of Art (2010), an MA in Critical and Curatorial Studies from the University of Louisville (2004), and a BFA from The Cooper Union (2002). Westbrook has lectured at Yale School of Art, Carnegie Mellon University, Cooper Union, Hartford Art School at the University of Hartford, the University of Wisconsin-Madison.

Between 2006 - 2012, Westbrook collaborated with The Paper Bag Players, the oldest operating children’s theater company in the United States. In 2017, Westbrook co-founded the periodic art journal Lookie-Lookie with artist and partner Johannes DeYoung, which included contributions and collaborations with artists Lisa Kereszi, Federico Solmi, Josephine Halvorson, Kenny Rivero, Jack Whitten, Martha Colburn, Mark Thomas Gibson, and William Villalongo amongst others.

Her own work uses both vibrant and monochrome palettes and addresses the complex relationship between humans and the natural environment, often using abstracted faces. Westbrook is represented by Reynolds Gallery, Richmond, VA, Keijsers Koning, Dallas, TX, Rarity Gallery, Mykonos, Greece. Her work can also be found in public collections including: The Markel Corporation, Redbank, New Jersey; the Art Bank Program, US Department of State, Washington, DC; Capital One, Richmond, VA; Haleakala Museum; Haleakala National Park, Maui, HI.
