= Kloser =

Kloser is a surname. Notable people with the surname include:

- Harald Kloser (born 1956), Austrian-born film composer, writer, and producer
- Heidi Kloser (born 1992), American freestyle skier
- Mike Kloser (born 1959), American mountain biker

== See also ==
- Kloner
- Klose
