= Closed =

Closed may refer to:

== Mathematics ==
- Closure (mathematics), a set, along with operations, for which applying those operations on members always results in a member of the set
- Closed set, a set which contains all its limit points
- Closed interval, an interval which includes its endpoints
- Closed line segment, a line segment which includes its endpoints
- Closed manifold, a compact manifold which has no boundary
- Closed differential form, a differential form whose exterior derivative is 0

== Sport ==
- Closed tournament, a competition open to a limited category of players
- Closed (poker), a betting round where no player will have the right to raise

== Other uses ==
- Closed (album), a 2010 album by Bomb Factory
- Closed GmbH, a German fashion brand
- Closed class, in linguistics, a class of words or other entities which rarely changes

== See also ==
- Close (disambiguation)
- Closed loop (disambiguation)
- Closing (disambiguation)
- Closure (disambiguation)
- Open (disambiguation)
