= Klos (surname) =

Klos or Kłos is the surname of the following people

- Elmar Klos (1910–1993), Czech film director
- Fabian Klos (born 1987), German football striker
- Felix Klos (born 1992), American-Dutch historian, political scientist and author
- Janusz Klos, Polish volleyball player
- Karol Kłos (born 1989), Polish volleyball player
- Oger Klos (born 1993), Dutch football midfielder
- Robert Kłos (born 1982), Polish football midfielder
- Stanley L. Klos (born 1954), American basketball player, businessman, and historical preservationist
- Stefan Klos (born 1971), German football goalkeeper
- Tomasz Kłos (born 1973), Polish football defender
- Vladimir Klos, Czech-born German ballet dancer
- Yashua Klos (born 1977), American visual artist
