= Laylah Ali =

American visual artist (born 1968)

- Born: 1968 (age 57–58); Buffalo, New York, U.S.
- Education: Williams College (BA); Washington University in St. Louis (MFA)
- Known for: Painting
- Notable work: The Greenheads Series
- Style: Gouache
- Awards: 2008 Joan Mitchell Foundation Painters and Sculptors Grant; 2007 United States Artists Fellowship; 2002 William H. Johnson Prize; 2001 Premio Regione Piemonte (Fondazione Sandretto Re Rebaudengo Per L’Arte, Turin, Italy); 2000 ICA Artist Prize (Institute of Contemporary Art, Boston, Massachusetts)

Laylah Ali (born 1968) is an American contemporary visual artist. She is known for paintings in which ambiguous race relations are depicted with a graphic clarity and cartoon-strip format. She lives in Williamstown, Massachusetts, and is a professor at Williams College.

== Early life and education ==
In her youth, Ali originally intended to be a lawyer or a doctor.

Ali received her B.A. degree (English and studio art) from Williams College, Williamstown, MA in 1991. She participated in the Whitney Independent Study Program at the Whitney Museum of American Art, New York City in 1992, and completed a residency at the Skowhegan School of Painting and Sculpture, Skowhegan, ME in 1993. Ali received her M.F.A. degree in 1994 from the Sam Fox School of Design & Visual Arts at Washington University in St. Louis.

== Work ==
In Ali's earlier work, she would draw or paint something violent. She focused more on the action than the violence itself. In her current work, there is not a lot of focus on the act; she is more attentive to what happens before and after. Laylah's work had a unique feature of including a level of emotion. She uses bright colors and cartoons to portray current events and socio-political ideas. She uses this unique approach of not using a specific event, so the audience can think through the art and have their own perception.

The works are small scale gouache paintings and drawings on paper. She is known to prepare for many months, planning out every detail so there is no room for mistakes. Ali's work is based on life experiences. Although one may not be able to tell, she says all of her work holds meaning and that what's in her mind transcends from her hands on paper. About the performative nature of her work, Ali says, "The paintings can be like crude stages or sets, the figures like characters in a play. I think of them equally as characters and figures."

Ali's work included an artistic lens of caricature. According to Charlotte Seaman, "Ali’s work is not grounded in the academic tradition, however it is informed by the rich history of caricature, especially as humorous or mocking social commentary". Ali used a unique idea of caricature, Seaman states "Ali uses the visual language of cartoons, comics, and to some extent caricatures. Notably, though, her work is opposed to racial caricature in that it does not exaggerate features of an individual – rather the opposite: it turns individuals into signs or ciphers of generalized (though still racialized) human experience"

=== The Greenheads Series ===
The subject of Ali's most well-known gouache paintings are Greenheads – characters designed to minimize, eliminate and interrogate categorical differences of gender, height, age, and, in some ways, race. Ali created more than 80 of these paintings between 1996 and 2005. Ali drew on imagery and topics from newspapers, such as images of protest signs or world leaders hugging, but tweaked the stories in order to create something distant and new. Ali designed the characters and images to be specific and yet vague. They have meaning from Ali herself but the viewer brings their own references to interpret the image as well. Ali designed the characters to look human-like but not quite human so that they would be removed from our world and social context. They have a socio-political meaning yet they exist outside of our world.

=== The Acephalous Series ===
Since 2015, Ali has been working on paintings she calls The Acephalous Series, featuring figures described as gender conscious, potentially sexual or sexualized, some of which have racial characteristics and some of which do not have heads. "They are on an endless, determined trek, a multi-part journey," she says, "It has elements of a forced migration."

=== Collaborations ===
In 2002, the Museum of Modern Art, New York, commissioned Ali to create a wordless graphic novelette. The artist collaborated with dancer and choreographer Dean Moss at The Kitchen in 2005 and at MASS MoCA in 2006 with figures on a field. They later premiered a performance titled Some sweet day at MoMA, New York in 2012. John Brown Song! was an online project launched by the Dia Art Foundation in 2013. Ali's outdoor billboard project for Walker without Walls at the Walker Art Center was documented on season 3 of the PBS series Art21: Art in the Twenty-First Century.

== Collections ==
Ali's works are included in the permanent collection of numerous public institutions, including the Studio Museum in Harlem; the Buffalo AKG Art Museum, Buffalo, NY; the Museum of Contemporary Art Chicago; RISD Museum, Providence, RI; the Walker Art Center, Minneapolis, MN; and the Whitney Museum of American Art and the Metropolitan Museum of Art in New York City.

== Exhibitions ==
=== Selected solo and group exhibitions ===
Laylah Ali has exhibited in both the Venice Biennale (2003) and the Whitney Biennial (2004). Other exhibitions include:

- 2024: Is anything the matter? Drawings by Laylah Ali, Marion Art Gallery, State University of New York at Fredonia, NY. January 23—April 14, 2024—traveling to University Museum of Contemporary Art, University of Massachusetts Amherst, MA. February 13—May 9, 2025; Colby College Museum of Art, Waterville, ME. October 21, 2025—April 19, 2026 (solo & catalog)
- 2021: Sweaty Concepts, Williams College Museum of Art, Williamstown, MA
- 2020: Never Done: 100 Years Of Women In Politics And Beyond, Tang Teaching Museum, Skidmore College, Saratoga Springs, NY
- 2019: Laylah Ali: The Acephalous Series, Silber Gallery, Goucher College, Baltimore, MD. January 29—March 16, 2019 (solo & catalog)
- 2018: Through-Line: Drawing and Weaving by 19 Artists, Steve Turner Gallery, Los Angeles, CA; Body / Parts, Mattatuck Museum, Waterbury, CT
- 2017: Laylah Ali: Paintings and Drawings, Hallwalls Contemporary Arts Center, Buffalo, NY. November 10—December 22, 2017 (solo & catalog)
- 2017: Laylah Ali: Not Self Portraits, curated by Lisa Jarrett and Harrell Fletcher, KSMoCA, Portland, OR. May—November, 2017
- 2016: Black Pulp! curated by Mark Thomas Gibson and William Villalongo, Edgewood Gallery, Yale School of Art, New Haven, CT. January 19—March 11, 2016—traveled to Print Center New York, NY. October 12—December 19, 2016; University of South Florida Contemporary Art Museum, Tampa, FL. June 2—July 20, 2017; Ezra and Cecile Zilkha Gallery, Wesleyan University, Middletown, CT. September 19—December 10, 2017; The African American Museum in Philadelphia, PA. February 2—April 29, 2018; Overgrowth, deCordova Sculpture Park and Museum, Lincoln, MA; Radio Imagination: Artists in the Archive of Octavia E. Butler, Armory Center for the Arts, Pasadena, CA
- 2015: The Acephalous Series, Paul Kasmin Gallery, New York, NY (solo)
- 2015: ASSISTED, curated by Jessica Stockholder, Kavi Gupta Gallery, Chicago, IL; Come as You Are: Art of the 1990s, Montclair Art Museum, Montclair, NJ—traveled to Telfair Museums, Savannah, GA. June 12—September 20, 2015; University of Michigan Museum of Art, Ann Arbor, MI. October 17, 2015—January 31, 2016; Blanton Museum of Art, University of Texas at Austin, TX. February 17—May 15, 2016
- 2014: Personal Histories, Seattle Art Museum, Seattle, WA; Up Every Evening, Season Gallery, Seattle, WA
- 2013: The Shadows Took Shape, The Studio Museum in Harlem, New York, NY (catalog); Ambiguous Histories: Selected Art from the Exit Art Portfolios, Art, Design, and Architecture Museum, University of California, Santa Barbara, CA; Laylah Ali & Gerald Cyrus, Pennsylvania College of Art and Design Gallery, Lancaster, PA; Direct Democracy, Monash University Museum of Art, Melbourne, Australia (catalog); Painting Between the Lines, Williams College Museum of Art, Williamstown, MA (catalog); Revelations: Examining Democracy, Broad Art Museum, Michigan State University, East Lansing, MI
- 2012: Laylah Ali: The Greenheads Series, Williams College Museum of Art, Williamstown, MA—traveled to Weisman Art Museum at the University of Minnesota, Minneapolis, MN. March 2—June 30, 2013; Herbert F. Johnson Museum of Art at Cornell University, Ithaca, NY. September 7—December 22, 2013 (solo & catalog)
- 2012: Thenceforward, and Forever Free, Haggerty Museum of Art, Marquette University, Milwaukee, WI; Under the Influence: The Comics, Lehman College Art Gallery, Bronx, NY; The Female Gaze: Women Artists Making Their World, Pennsylvania Academy of the Fine Arts, Philadelphia, PA (catalog); Voluntaries, MoMA, New York, NY, part of the “Some sweet day” series (collaborative performance with Dean Moss)
- 2011: The Air We Breathe, San Francisco Museum of Modern Art, San Francisco, CA (catalog); Painting Between the Lines, CCA Wattis Institute for Contemporary Arts, San Francisco, CA (catalog); Relatos extraordinarios: Laylah Ali and Abigail Lazkoz, Sala Parpalló, Valencia, Spain (catalog); Vivid: Female Currents in Painting, Schroeder Romero & Shredder, New York, NY
- 2010: Works on Paper from the MCA Collection, Museum of Contemporary Art Chicago, IL; Collected: Reflections on the Permanent Collection, The Studio Museum in Harlem, New York, NY
- 2009: Off the Beaten Path: Violence, Women and Art. Art Works for Change, Stenersen Museum, Oslo, Norway—traveled to University Art Gallery, University of California, San Diego, CA (2009–2010); Centro Cultural Tijuana and Museo Universitario del Chopo, Mexico City, Mexico (2010); Chicago Cultural Center, Chicago, IL (2011); Global Health Odyssey Museum, Atlanta, GA (2011); Prospect.2 New Orleans and Newcomb Art Museum, Tulane University, New Orleans, LA (2011); The Art Gallery of Calgary, Alberta, Canada (2013); Fundación Canal, Madrid, Spain (2013); Johannesburg Art Gallery, Johannesburg, South Africa (2013); Winnipeg Art Gallery, Manitoba, Canada (2014); Paper Trail: A Decade of Acquisitions from the Walker Art Center, Figge Art Museum, Davenport, IA; Massachusetts Review: Celebrating Fifty Years of Covers, University of Massachusetts Amherst, MA; If I Didn't Care: Generational Artists Discuss Cultural Histories, The Park School, Baltimore, MD
- 2008: Laylah Ali: Notes/Drawings/Untitled Afflictions, deCordova Sculpture Park and Museum, Lincoln, MA (solo & catalog)
- 2008: Beyond Drawing: Constructed Realities, Ohio University Art Gallery, Athens, OH; Fantastical Imaginings, The Delaware Contemporary, Wilmington, DE—traveled to Julio Fine Arts Gallery, Loyola University Maryland, Baltimore, MD (2009); Political Circus, Ritter Art Gallery, Florida Atlantic University, Boca Raton, FL; On the Margins, Mildred Lane Kemper Art Museum, Washington University in St. Louis, MO (catalog); Disguised, Rotwand Gallery, Zurich, Switzerland; Out of Shape, Frances Lehman Loeb Art Center, Vassar College, Poughkeepsie, NY (catalog); Taking Possession, University of Arkansas at Little Rock, AR; Perverted by Theater, Apexart, New York, NY; Pandora's Box, Dunlop Art Gallery, Regina, Saskatchewan, Canada (catalog); Quadrennial 2008, U-Turn Quadrennial for Contemporary Art, Copenhagen, Denmark (catalog); Text/Messages: Books by Artists, Walker Art Center, Minneapolis, MN
- 2007: the kiss and other warriors, Institute of International Visual Arts, London, England (solo & catalog)
- 2007: Drawings from the Typology Series, Pennsylvania Academy of the Fine Arts, Philadelphia, PA—traveled to University of Iowa Museum of Art, Iowa City, IA; University of Arizona Museum of Art, Tucson, AZ (solo & catalog)
- 2006: Alien Nation, Institute of Contemporary Arts, London, England—traveled to Manchester Art Gallery, Manchester, England; Sainsbury Centre for Visual Arts, Norwich, England (catalog); Cult Fiction, Hayward Gallery, London, England (catalog); Counterparts: Contemporary Painters and Their Influences, Virginia Museum of Contemporary Art, Virginia Beach, VA (catalog); Running Around the Pool, Florida State University Museum of Fine Arts, Tallahassee, FL (catalog); XXS, Sommer Contemporary Art Gallery, Tel Aviv, Israel; American Matrix, Harn Museum of Art, University of Florida, Gainesville, FL; Black Alphabet, Zacheta National Gallery of Art, Warsaw, Poland (catalog); Having New Eyes, Aspen Art Museum, Aspen, CO
- 2005: The Body. The Ruin, Ian Potter Museum of Art, University of Melbourne, Melbourne, Australia (catalog); Cut, Susanne Vielmetter Los Angeles Projects, Los Angeles, CA; Vivi-Seccion: Dibujo Contemporaneo, Museo de Arte Carrillo Gil, Mexico City, Mexico; 303 Gallery, New York, NY
- 2004: Laylah Ali: Types, Contemporary Art Museum St. Louis, MO (solo & catalog)
- 2004: Whitney Biennial 2004, Whitney Museum of American Art, New York, NY (catalog); Material Witness, Museum of Contemporary Art Cleveland, OH (catalog); The 10 Commandments, KW Institute for Contemporary Art, Berlin, Germany
- 2003: Crosscurrents at Century's End: Selections from the Neuberger Berman Art Collection, Henry Art Gallery, University of Washington, Seattle, WA—traveled to Norton Museum of Art, West Palm Beach, FL; Tampa Museum of Art, Tampa, FL; Chicago Cultural Center, Chicago, IL (catalog); Fault Lines: Contemporary African Art and Shifting Landscapes, Venice Biennale, Venice, Italy (catalog); me & more, Kunstmuseum Luzern, Lucerne, Switzerland (catalog); Splat! Boom! Pow! The Influence of Cartoons in Contemporary Art, Contemporary Arts Museum Houston, TX—traveled to ICA, Boston, MA; Wexner Center for the Arts, The Ohio State University, Columbus, OH (catalog)
- 2002: Projects 75: Laylah Ali, The Museum of Modern Art, New York, NY (solo & catalog)
- 2002: Comic Release: Negotiating Identity for a New Generation, Miller ICA, Carnegie Mellon University, Pittsburgh, PA—traveled to Contemporary Arts Center, New Orleans, LA; University of North Texas, Denton, TX; Western Washington University, Bellingham, WA (catalog); Fantasyland, D’Amelio Terras, New York, NY; First Person Singular, Seattle Art Museum, Seattle, WA; Painting in Boston, deCordova Sculpture Park and Museum, Lincoln, MA
- 2001: Laylah Ali: 2000 ICA Artist Prize, Institute of Contemporary Art, Boston, MA (solo & catalog)
- 2001: Paintings on Paper, Massachusetts Museum of Contemporary Art, North Adams, MA (solo)
- 2001: Against the Wall: Painting Against the Grid, Surface, Frame, Institute of Contemporary Art, University of Pennsylvania, Philadelphia, PA; Freestyle, The Studio Museum in Harlem, New York, NY (catalog); FRESH: 1998—2000, New Museum of Contemporary Art, New York, NY; Guarene Arte 2001, Palazzo Re Rebaudengo, Turin, Italy; A Work in Progress: Selections from the New Museum Collection, New Museum, New York, NY
- 2000: Art on Paper 2000, Weatherspoon Art Museum, University of North Carolina at Greensboro, NC
- 1999: Laylah Ali: Small Aggressions, Museum of Contemporary Art Chicago, IL (solo)
- 1999: Bizarro World! The Parallel Universes of Comics and Fine Art, Rollins Museum of Art, Winter Park, FL; Collectors Collect Contemporary, ICA, Boston, MA; The 1999 deCordova Annual Exhibition, deCordova Sculpture Park and Museum, Lincoln, MA (catalog); No Place Rather than Here, 303 Gallery, New York, NY
- 1998: Paradise 8, Exit Art, New York, NY; Posing, Boston Center for the Arts, Boston, MA; Selections Summer 1998, The Drawing Center, New York, NY; Telling Tales, Atrium Gallery, University of Connecticut, Storrs, CT

== Awards ==
Laylah Ali has been awarded a number of grants, residencies and awards, including Anonymous Was A Woman grant in 2026, the Joan Mitchell Foundation Painters and Sculptors Grant in 2008, the Joan Mitchell Foundation Residency in 2018, a 2006 United States Artists Fellowship, the 2000 ICA/Boston Artist Prize as well as invitations as artist-in-residence at Tamarind Institute (2019), Yaddo (2015), Dartmouth College (2012), Headlands Center for the Arts (2000), and Skowhegan School of Painting and Sculpture (1993).

== Bibliography ==
Selected artist books, exhibition catalogs, print editions and press:

- Is Anything the Matter? Drawings by Laylah Ali. Essays by Karen Kurczynski and Arisa White; interview with Romi Crawford, Marion Art Gallery, SUNY Fredonia, NY, 2024. ISBN 9798218308711
- Four letterpress prints (edition of 250) from “Self-Portraits with Nat Turner’s Vision” 1994 series, printed and published by Pellinore Press, Baltimore, MD, in collaboration with Goucher College, 2019.
- Laylah Ali: The Acephalous Series. Essays by Alex Ebstein, Tisa Bryant, Kaitlyn Greenidge; interview with Lillian-Yvonne Bertram, Silber Gallery, Goucher College, Baltimore, MD, 2019. ISBN 9781792300394
- Comfort with Rage. Silkscreen print (edition of 100) commissioned by Printed Matter for NY Art Book Fair, printed and published by Kayrock Screenprinting, Brooklyn, NY, 2018.
- Sixteen Drawings. Hallwalls Contemporary Arts Center, Buffalo, NY, 2017.
- Laylah Ali: The Greenheads Series. Essays by Julia Bryan-Wilson and Kevin Young; interview with Deborah Rothschild, Williams College Museum of Art, Williamstown, MA, 2012. ISBN 9780913697306
- Laylah Ali: Note Drawings. Essay by Dina Deitsch; interview with Kevin Young, deCordova Sculpture Park and Museum, Lincoln, MA, 2008. ISBN 9780945506591
- Laylah Ali: Typology. Essay by Alex Baker; interview with Kara Walker, Pennsylvania Academy of the Fine Arts, Philadelphia, PA, 2007. ISBN 9780943836300
- Notes with Little Illustration. Institute of International Visual Arts, London, book design by the artist and Nicole Parente, 2007.
- The Believer: The Visual Issue. Interview with Tisa Bryant, p. 79, Dec. 2005 - Jan. 2006
- Types. Contemporary Art Museum St. Louis, MO, 2005 ISBN 0971219567
- Untitled. Aquatint etching print (edition of 50) published by Wingate Studio, Hinsdale, NH, 2002. In the collection of the RISD Museum.
- Untitled. Graphic novelette published on the occasion of Projects 75 for The Museum of Modern Art, New York, NY, digital production by Nicole Parente, 2002.
- Laylah Ali: ICA Artist Prize 2000. Essays by Jessica Morgan and Suzanne Wise; interview with Rebecca Walker, ICA Boston, MA, 2001. ISBN 0910663610
