= Close (surname) =

Close is an English surname. Notable people with the surname include:

- Close (1817 cricketer), English first-class cricketer whose forename is unknown
- Alex Close, Belgian cyclist
- Brian Close, English cricketer
- Carl B. Close, American politician
- Charles Close, British geographer
- Chris Close, Australian rugby league player
- Chuck Close, American photorealist painter
- Del Close, American actor and theater director
- Elmer Close, American politician
- Eric Close, American actor
- Frank Close, British physicist
- Glenn Close, American actress
- Ivy Close, British beauty queen
- Joshua Close, Canadian actor
- Maxwell Henry Close, Irish geologist
- Nicholas Close, English priest
- Philippe Close, Mayor of Brussels
- Ray Close, CIA analyst
- Roberta Close, Brazilian transsexual model
- Sarah Close, English singer-songwriter
- Sasha Close, Australian actress
- Seamus Close, Northern Ireland politician
- Sigrid Close, Stanford University professor
- Thomas Close, English antiquarian and archeologist
