= Mark Thomas Gibson =

American visual artist (born 1980)

- Born: 1980 (age 45–46); Miami, Florida, US
- Education: Cooper Union (BA); Yale School of Art (MFA)
- Known for: Painting, printmaking
- Website: www.markthomasgibson.com/blog/

Mark Thomas Gibson (born 1980, Miami, Florida) is an American visual artist working in painting, print, ink, and watercolor. Gibson's work explores Black representation in the United States using the medium of comics.

== Education ==
Gibson received his B.F.A. from Cooper Union and his M.F.A. from Yale School of Art in painting and printmaking in 2013, where he received the Ely Harwood Schless Memorial Fund Award.

== Art ==
Gibson focuses on using the language of comic as a tool for social justice. His work involves graphic novels, consisting of black and white pen drawings, and colorful paintings developed from imageries chosen from his books. Gibson's artist statement describes his artistic choices and vision:

I look at American culture from a multipartite viewpoint as an artist—as a black male, a professor, an American history buff and comic book nerd. These myriad of often colliding perspectives fuel my exploration of American culture through the high and low visual languages of painting and comics to reveal a narrative that spells out our fabricated destruction. The black ink and strong color in my work create stark contrasts in which positive and negative space define the composition. I rely on a minimal aesthetic, playing off of both fine art and the comic book vernacular of sequential narrative. In all the works, I try to shine a light on the grim and gritty social realities of contemporary America.

His influences include artists Honoré Daumier, Robert Gober, Philip Guston, Kerry James Marshall, and Kara Walker. Comic creators Oliver Harrington, Dwayne McDuffie, and Jim Steranko, as well as film directors Stanley Kubrick and Alfred Hitchcock.

=== Some Monsters Loom Large (2016) ===
Some Monsters Loom Large is a narrative that features Mr. Wolfson, a wolf-man. Mr. Wolfson is first introduced basking in the sun on a desert island, slowly going insane. After a while, he discovers a mount-like structure with horns popping out of the ocean. He climbs inside and is presented with a small theatre production showcasing a brief history of Western colonialism and colonization of America. During this film, Mr. Wolfson learns that the cannibalism of Native Americans by pilgrims in the founding of America birthed an evil spirit named, "Manifest Destiny". The evil spirit infects anyone who comes in contact with it, transforming into them into wolf-men. Throughout the narrative, Mr. Wolfson is chased down and murdered by Manifest Destiny multiple times, which mark the endings of each volume. His solo exhibition, Some Monsters Loom Large, showed in Fredericks & Freiser, included installation of colorized reproductions of drawings found in the book as acrylic paintings.

=== Early Retirement (2017) ===
Early Retirement is a narrative that "revolves around Mr. Wolfson, a werewolf and Doomsday prophet in New York City's street prophecy scene, and The Drummer, one of the three heralds of the Apocalypse. One day, The Drummer learns that the Truth has been delivered to Mr. Wolfson. Things quickly spiral out of control, leading to a three-way standoff between the Will of the People, the Will of Government and the Will of God." This work was influenced by the American presidential election of 2016, and his question regarding quest for utopia, and ways to join forces to go against the adversity in the United States of America. His solo exhibition, Early Retirement, showed in Fredericks & Freiser, included installation of black and white ink drawings and colorized reproductions as acrylic paintings.

== Curation ==
=== Black Pulp ===
Black Pulp! is an exhibition co-curated by William Villalongo and Mark Thomas Gibson first shown at Yale University. The show gets its name from the term "pulp" which is a cheap paper that allowed ephemera such as newspapers, books, fliers, and posters to be printed inexpensively in the 19th and 20th centuries. The accessibility of pulp facilitated mass communication within and about the black community. Villalongo wishes the exhibition will highlight "historical efforts within the medium to rebuff derogatory image culture with exceptional wit, beauty, and humor, to provide emerging, nuanced perspective on black humanity."

The collection provides a perspective of black and non-black artists and publishers who work to draw attention to the black experience in American culture and history from 1912 to 2016 through contemporary works of art and historical printed media.

Black Pulp! consists of a wide range of works, ranging from comic books and historic texts and magazines, to digital prints, drawings, and media-based works by contemporary artists. With this eclectic collection, the exhibition draws connection from various Afrocentric movements of the 20th century and today. Black Pulp! features works by 21 artists from the Black diaspora: Derrick Adams, Laylah Ali, Firelei Báez, Nayland Blake, Robert Colescott, Renee Cox, William Downs, Ellen Gallagher, Trenton Doyle Hancock, Lucia Hierro, Yashua Klos, Kerry James Marshall, Wangechi Mutu, Lamar Peterson, Pope.L, Kenny Rivero, Alexandria Smith, Felandus Thames, Hank Willis Thomas, Kara Walker, and Fred Wilson.

== Teaching ==
Gibson is an Assistant Professor of Art & Design at Mason Gross School of the Arts, Rutgers - New Brunswick. Previously he was an associate professor at Tyler School of Art at Temple University. and prior to that he was a full-time lecturer and the assistant dean of student affairs at the Yale School of Art.

== Awards ==
Louis Comfort Tiffany Foundation Grant 2023, Guggenheim Fellowship 2022, Hodder Fellowship 2022, Pew Fellowship 2022, Ely Harwood Schless Memorial Fund Award 2013, Yale School of Art Yale Norfolk Assistantship 2012, awarded by Samuel Messer, Associate Dean
