= Try a Little Tenderness (disambiguation) =

"Try a Little Tenderness" is a 1932 song notably recorded by Otis Redding in 1966.

"Try a Little Tenderness" may also refer to:

- "Try a Little Tenderness" (The Jeffersons), a 1984 TV episode
- Try a Little Tenderness, a 1978 play by John Osborne
- Try a Little Tenderness, a 2017 art exhibition by Alexandria Smith
