= Induna.com =

Indian e-retail platform

Induna (India) Private Limited
- "Cinema Shop on the Net"
- Website type: Private
- Founded: 2007; 19 years ago
- Dissolved: 2023
- Headquarters: Kolkata, West Bengal, India
- Founders: Aadarsh Agarwal; Siddhant Agarwal
- Industry: Internet
- Products: Home video
- Services: E-commerce (online shopping)
- Website: Induna.com
- Current status: Defunct

Induna.com was Indian e-retail or e-commerce platform headquartered in Kolkata, India launched on 21 October 2007 by Agarwal brothers, Aadarsh and Siddhant. An online shop for Indian film DVDs, VCDs and audio CDs, it became the top three clicked websites of Kolkatta in its launch year as per the Google Zeitgeist 2008 report.

In March 2023, Induna announced its closure. The company informed customers via email and social media that it cease accepting orders after March 20.

== History ==
In 2009, the company added the Blu-ray format as well, for regional language films along with Bollywood and Bengali film titles, as well as a collection of Swedish films directed by Ingmar Bergman.

== Founders ==
Brothers Aadarsh Agarwal and Siddhant Agarwal, both commerce graduates from Kolkata University, decided to launch their own online company as they experienced the dismal state of many online stores when they ordered movies.

== Shut Down ==
The company was dissolved in March 2023.

== See also ==
- E-commerce in India
- Online shopping
