= Conclusion =

Conclusion may refer to:

== Media ==
- Conclusion (music), the ending of a composition
- Conclusion (album), an album by Conflict
- The Conclusion (album), an album by Bombshell Rocks
- "Conclusions" (A Touch of Frost), a 1992 television episode
- Baahubali 2: The Conclusion, 2017 Indian film
- "Conclusion", a song from Wu Tang Clan's Enter the Wu-Tang (36 Chambers)

== Law ==
- Conclusion of law, a question which must be answered by applying relevant legal principles
- Conclusion of fact, a question which must be answered by reference to facts and evidence

== Logic ==
- Consequent, the second half of a hypothetical proposition
- Logical consequence (or entailment), the relationship between statements that holds true when one logically "follows from" one or more others
- Result (or upshot), the final consequence of a sequence of actions or events
- Affirmative conclusion from a negative premise, a logical fallacy

== Other uses ==
- Conclusion (book), the concluding section of a book
- Conclusion of Utrecht, a synod of the Christian Reformed Church
- Statistical conclusion validity, a statistical test
- Sudler's Conclusion, a historic home in Puerto Rico, Somerset County, Maryland

== See also ==
- Closing (disambiguation)
- End (disambiguation)
- Final (disambiguation)
