= Old Town of Flushing Burial Ground =

Historic cemetery in Queens, New York

- The Olde Towne of Flushing Burial Ground
- U.S. National Register of Historic Places
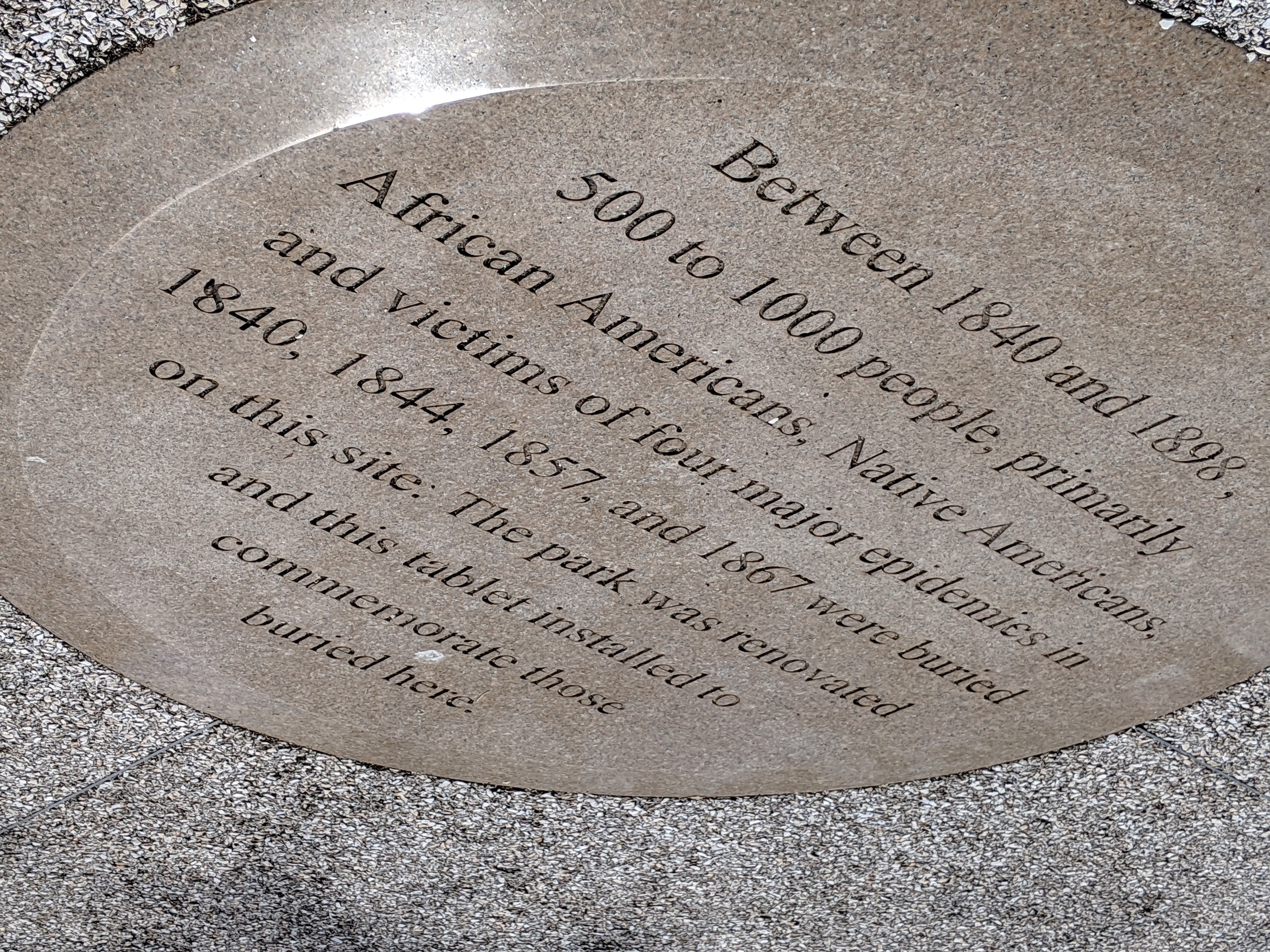
- Center stone at Plaza

- Location within New York City Location within New York Location within the United States
- Location: 165th St. and 46th Ave., Flushing, New York
- Coordinates: 40°45′15.06″N 73°48′8.94″W
- Area: 3.5 acres (1.4 ha)
- Built: 1840
- NRHP reference No.: 100002079
- Added to NRHP: February 2, 2018

Old Town of Flushing Burial Ground is a historic cemetery located in Flushing, Queens, New York City. It was established in 1840 and known as The Olde Towne of Flushing Burial Ground. It was the result of cholera and smallpox epidemics in 1840 and 1844, added by town elders north of Flushing Cemetery due to fears of contamination of church burial grounds. Once known as "Pauper Burial Ground", "Colored Cemetery of Flushing" and "Martin's Field", it was purchased by the New York City Department of Parks and Recreation on December 2, 1914, and renamed in 2009 to "The Olde Towne of Flushing Burial Ground".

It is co-located with a children's playground called "Martin’s Field". The cemetery's recognition and status as a Queens landmark was spearheaded by local community activist Mandingo Osceola Tshaka, who became interested in the cemetery when he discovered that members from the Macedonia African Methodist Episcopal Church of Flushing were buried there. It was placed on the National Register of Historic Places in 2018.

== Early history ==
George Washington, like other noted landowners, journeyed to Flushing, as the community was a center of scientific horticulture. The cemetery's floral and arboreal beauty have become a memorial to Flushing's status as a center of horticulture to this day.

The town of Flushing suffered a cholera epidemic circa 1840 and a smallpox epidemic in 1844. Fears that the infected corpses would contaminate the church burial grounds the town elders purchased the land from the Bowne family and created a separate burial ground to be used for the infected to be buried in. By 1854, medical science had progressed and improved hygiene helped ward off such diseases, fewer epidemics resulted in a lessened need for the separate unconsecrated graveyard and it fell into disuse.

In the latter decades of the 1800s it was set aside for use by the African American community. This was a result of editorials published in the Flushing Journal in the 1850s regarding the African Methodist Episcopalian (AME) church running out of burial space. From about 1880 to its closing in 1898 it became primarily a burial ground for African-Americans and Native Americans.

By 1914, the land was used as the "town commons" or "village green", and by 1930 it had been paved over and made into a park called "Martin's Field". In 1936, Robert Moses, NYC Commissioner of Parks, spearheaded the initiative to re-purpose the green into a recreational space for children.

As one of the many projects during the Works Progress Administration period, a modern children's playground was built on the site. It was during excavation that workers came across evidence of the previous usage as a burial ground. Found at the dig were remains which still had pennies over the eyes, an archaic practice that was also observed in excavation of the African Burial Ground in lower Manhattan.

By 1938, the new playground, with a wading pool, baseball field and swing sets opened to the public. The WPA's historical division conducted interviews with local citizens about the sites history as a burial ground for a permanent record. The only grave markers that remained was for the Bunn family, who were members of the AME church.

== Archeological dig ==
In 1990, local activist Mandingo Osceola Tshaka helped publicize the history of the green, resulting in a $50,000 archaeological study in 1996 commissioned by the Parks Department. Archeologist Linda Stone concluded that the site served as final-resting place for between 500 and 1000 individuals. Death records for the town of Flushing exist for the period 1881–1898, showing that during this period, 62% of the burials were African American or Native American, 34% were un-identified, and more than half were children under the age of five.

== 21st century ==
In 2004, Queens Borough President Helen Marshall and NYC Councilmember John Liu allocated $2.667 million in funding to renovate the park, the largest improvement since 1938. A paved area bears a central stone inscribed with the sites history, and a historic wall was recreated and engraved with the names from the only four headstones remaining in 1919. Mature oaks, as well as new trees and shrubs, serve as the natural link between the past and present.

The trees provide shade for the burial ground as well as the newly installed playground which was moved to the northern end of the site, above whose entrance is the designation, "Martin's Field". It was placed on a sill system foundation so as not to disturb the land, and is accessible from the 165th Street entrance. In 2009, a naming ceremony for the site was held and parks department signs were placed for "The Olde Towne of Flushing Burial Ground" and "Martin’s Field".

In 2018, Mayor Bill de Blasio, Queens Borough President Melinda Katz, and community members announced that $1.63 million in funding had been allocated to reconstruct a commemorative plaza at the site. The plaza would include a butterfly garden, new benches, and cardinal directions in the Lenape language. The burial ground was also added to the New York State and National Register of Historic Places. A memorial to the Africans and Native Americans interred at the burial ground was dedicated in November 2021.

In 2019, artist Alexandria Smith created an exhibition at the Queens Museum, Monuments To An Effigy, which sought to bring remembrance to the women who were buried at this site.

== Gallery ==
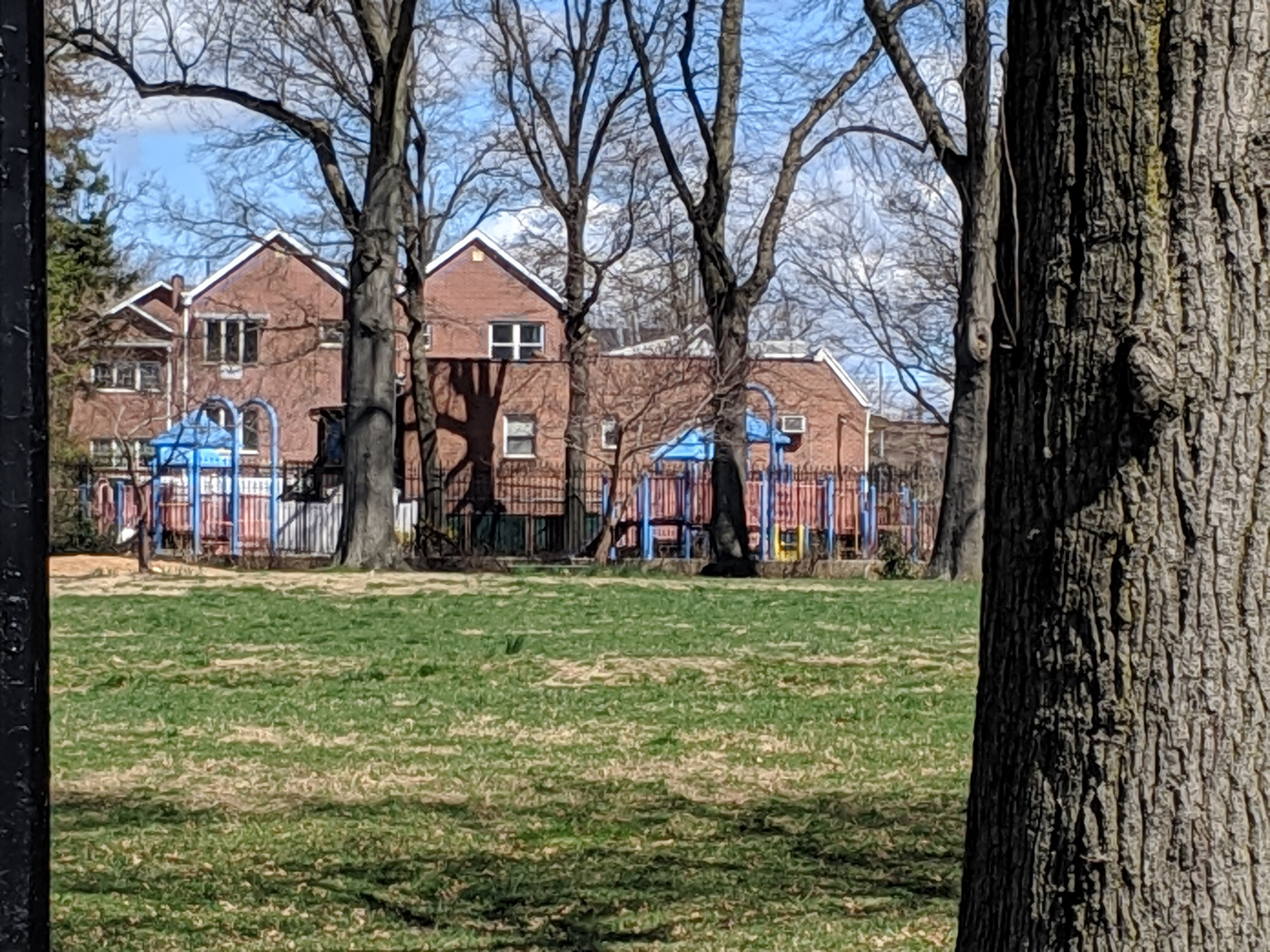
Martin's Field and playground

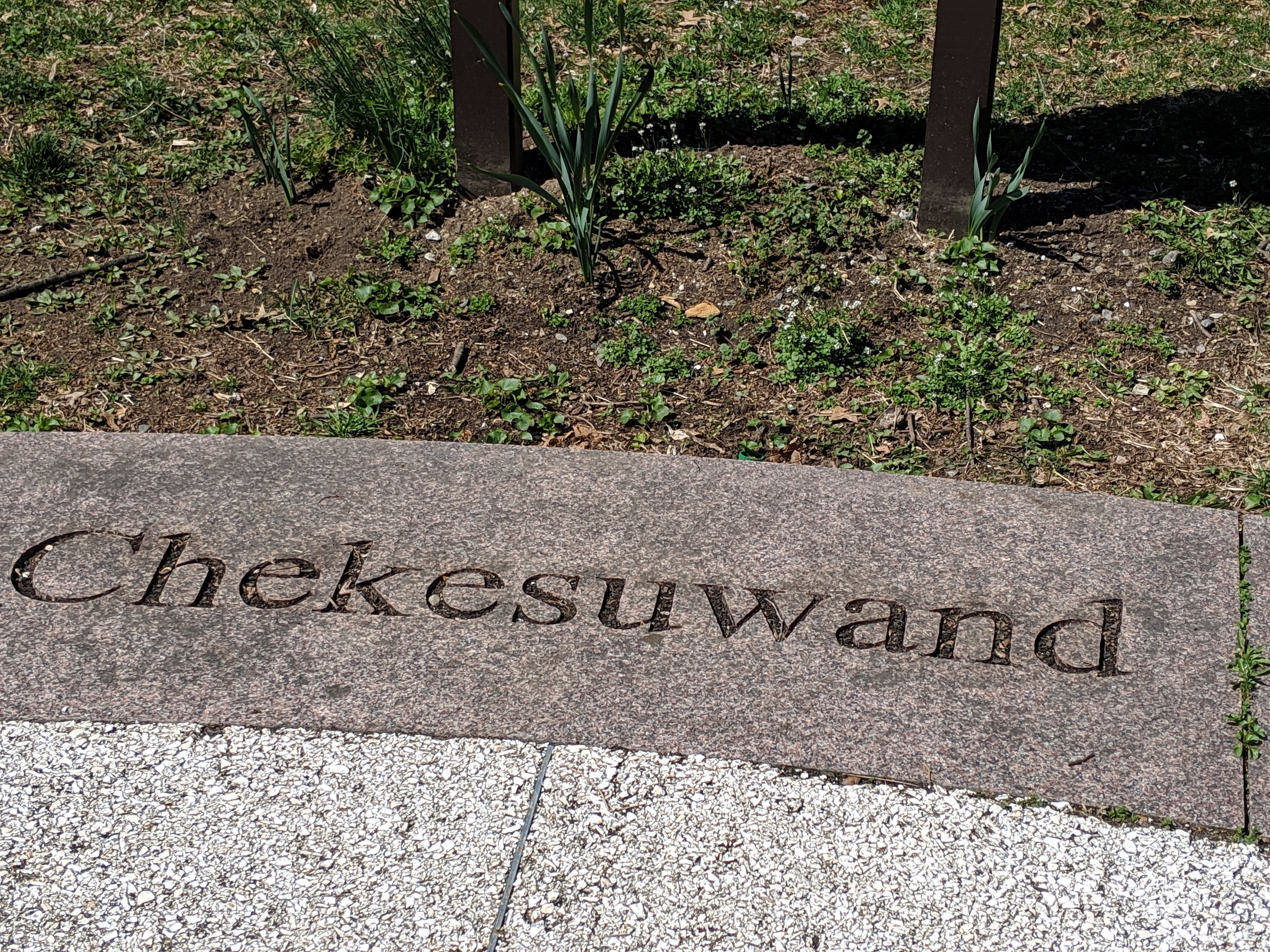
Chekesuwand

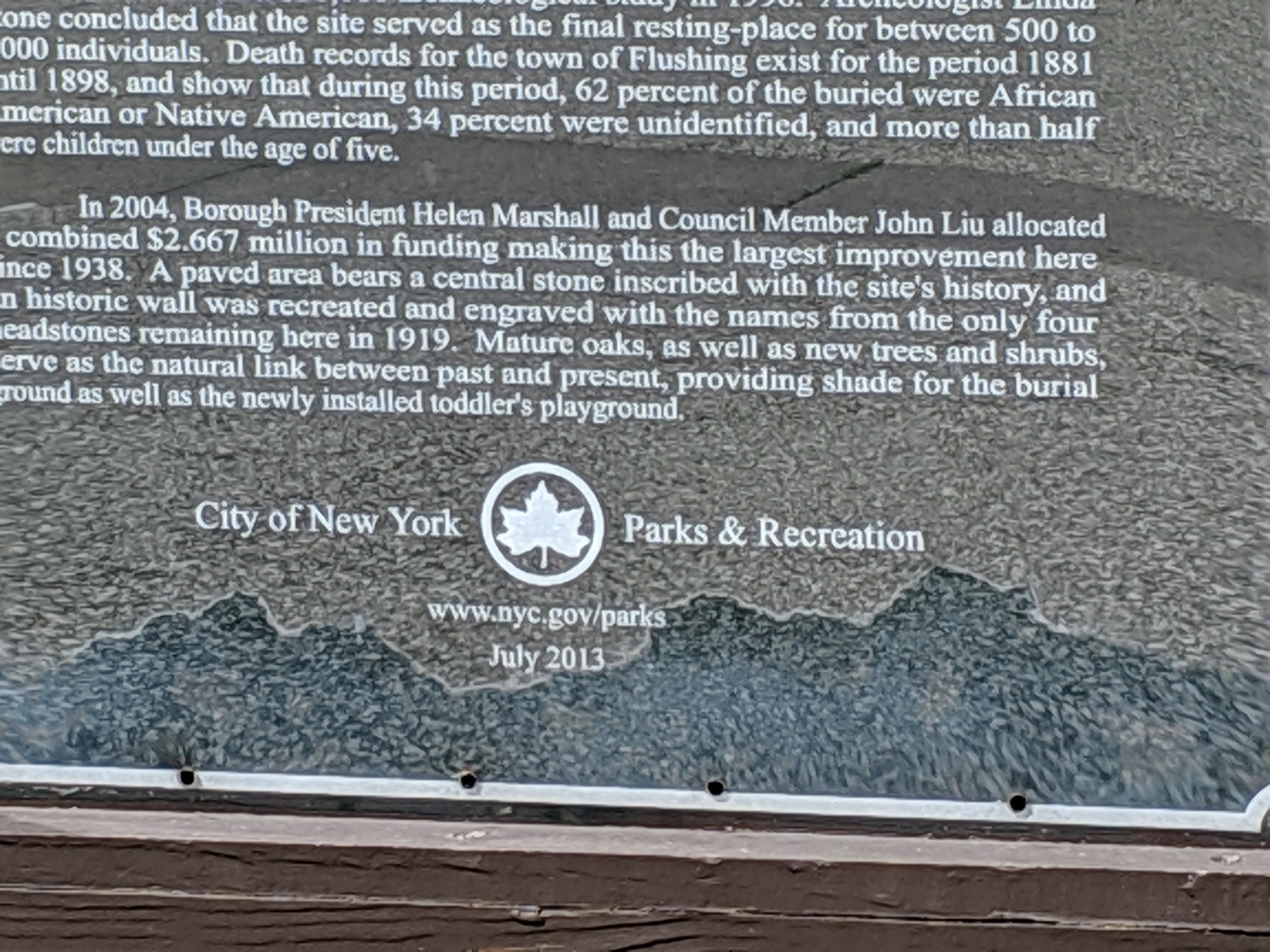
Sign detail

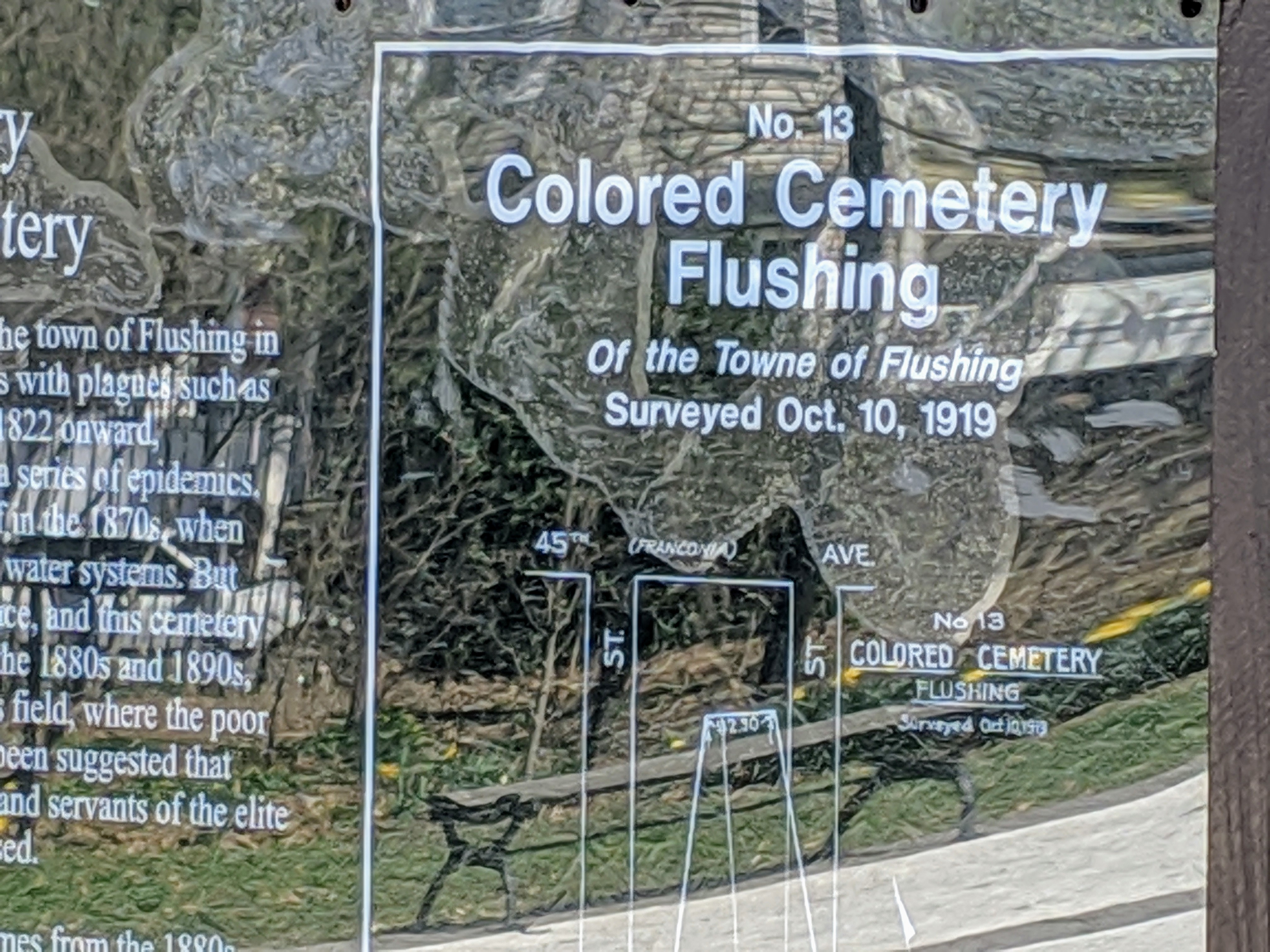
Detail of info sign

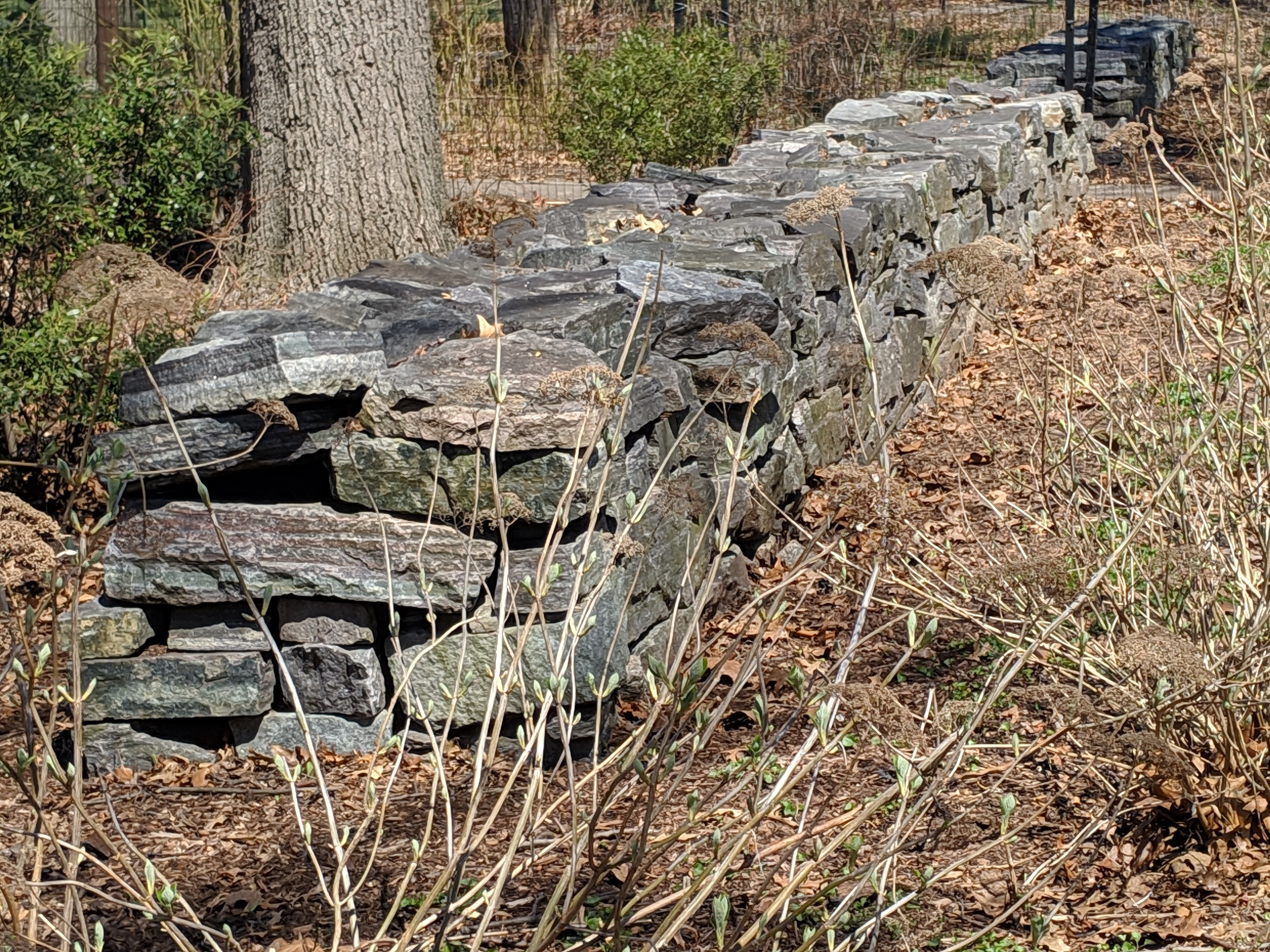
Cairn at OTFAABG

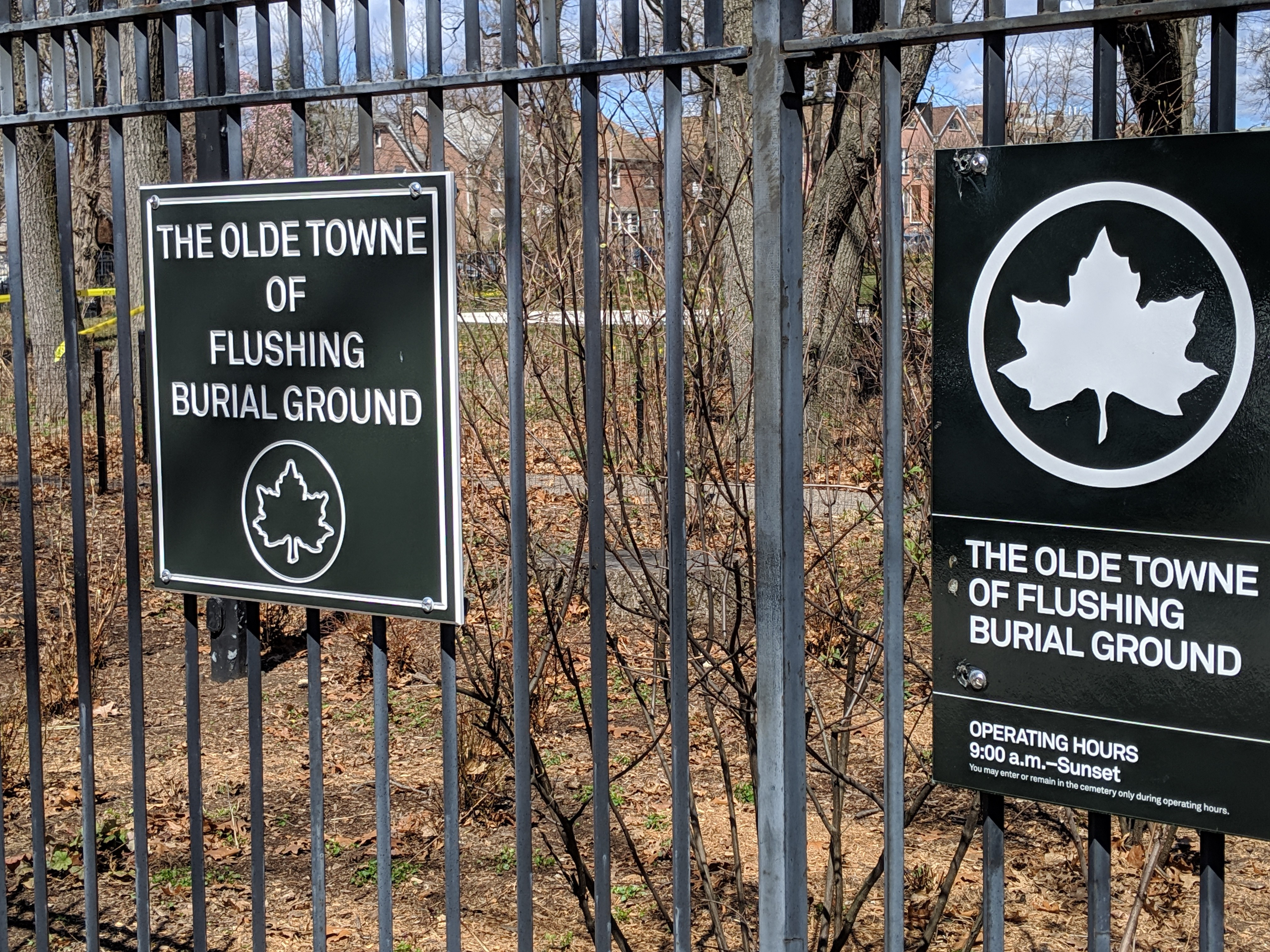
NYC Parks Dept fencing, signs, South of burial ground
