= Paper Bag Players =

The Paper Bag Players are a New York City based theatre troupe for children and was founded in 1958 by Judith Martin, Shirley Kaplin, Sudie Bond, and Remy Charlip. Their goal was to create a theater for children that would incorporate the experimental art scene of Manhattan's downtown.

== Awards ==
The company has won many awards, including several Obies and repeated grants from the National Endowment for the Arts and City of New York.

== Members ==
- Founding: Judith Martin, Shirley Kaplin, Sudie Bond, and Remy Charlip
- Acted or toured with: Betty Osgood, Irving Burton, James Lally, Jan Maxwell, Ted Brackett, Guy Gsell
- Musical director: Donald Ashwander
- Artists: Red Grooms, Natalie Westbrook, Jonathan Peck

== Music ==
A distinctive feature of the Paper Bag Players is their modern ragtime music, this is largely the work of Donald Ashwander, who worked closely with Judy Martin until Ashwander's passing in 1994.
