= Kloner =

Kloner is a surname. Notable people with the surname include:

- Amos Kloner (1940–2019), Israeli archaeologist
- Hymie Kloner (1929–2010), South African footballer

== See also ==
- Kloser
