= Kenny Rivero =

Dominican-American visual artist based in Bronx, NY

- Born: April 11, 1981 (age 45); Washington Heights, Manhattan, New York
- Education: Skowhegan School of Painting and Sculpture (2017); Yale School of Art (MFA, 2012); School of Visual Arts (BFA, 2006)
- Website: kennyrivero.nyc

Kenny Rivero (born 1981, Washington Heights, Manhattan, New York) is a Dominican-American visual artist who makes paintings, drawings, and sculptures that explore the complexity of identity through narrative images, collage and assemblage, language, and symbolism. Rivero is currently an assistant professor at Columbia University School of the Arts. He was previously a lecturer in Painting and Printmaking at the Yale School of Art and a visiting artist at The Cooper Union.

== Early life and education ==
Rivero was born to Dominican parents and raised in Washington Heights, Manhattan, NY. His Dominican-American identity and personal history is central to his work.

He received a BFA from the School of Visual Arts (2006), New York, NY, and an MFA in Painting and Printmaking from Yale University School of Art, New Haven, CT (2012). He attended the Skowhegan School of Painting and Sculpture in 2017.

== Work ==
Rivero is primarily a painter but also creates drawings, prints, and sculptures. His work engages the deeply personal. His paintings depict spaces and interactions between figures that appear fantastical, dangerous, foreboding, nostalgic, or tender. Figures in his work seem to be spirits, superhuman, or physical representations of psychological states. His paintings often include elements of assemblage, using objects of personal significance, often cherished mementos, or pieces of New York City, for instance, "Old cigarette packs salvaged from the Gramercy building where he worked as a doorman, dominoes fresh from a match: Each of his three-dimensional canvases are a layered "memory palette" [...]."

In an article for Hyperallergic, Benjamin Sutton describes the figures, symbolism, and mysticism in Rivero's painting titled Homage to the Three Three (PE NYK) (2015), "[it] has a ghostly head floating (or painted) on a brick wall. Around the corner flames shoot from a window, while a cluster of numbers apparently tagged on the wall tempt the viewer's inner cryptographer. [...] Rivero's piece is full of lovely painterly effects, from the thickening series of lines that make up the figure's fan-like hair to the precise, Op art-ish grid of brick outlines. The painting is full of opaque symbolism." And in the Brooklyn Rail, Alex Jen describes It Happened on the Corner (2014), on view in Lure of the Dark At Mass MoCA in 2019, "a man lies sick on the ground as pairs of scuffed oxfords walk past. The sidewalk is painted to look like board game tiles. A smoke-stained sliver filled with monsters projects out of his belly like a magnified microscope illustration, and combusts at the bottom in a brilliantly painted fire so thick and crusted it looks whittled." Jen continues by describing the symbolism in another painting, Ask About Me (2017), "A nervous, coded pictograph of one's personal interiors, little crosses mark graves in the dark among pyramids, faceted gems, and empty cars."

Rivero's work aims to capture the supernatural elements of everyday, real experience, intertwining the ways in which reality seem surreal, especially when related to violence, pain, and grief. As described by Paul D'Agostino for L Magazine, Rivero's work, "is full of surprises that are not exactly stunning, terrors that aren't really scary, notes of humor that aren't necessarily funny, fantastical figments that are actually just real, and barely nightmarish murmurs that hum, also, in tones of just-awoken awareness, such that the dream is at once active and over. [...] A wonderful walk through the fanciful normalities and quotidian strangenesses of dreams—or of the blurred focus and liminal discomforts of what it looks and feels like to be dreaming. [...] the works lure you in while lulling you deeply into some cognitive elsewhere."

== Exhibitions ==
=== Selected solo exhibitions ===
- 2025 - Ash on Everything, Charles Moffett Gallery, NY, NY
- 2024 - Posthumously Speaking: Dear Dear Summer Some Are, Morán Morán, Los Angeles, CA
- 2023 - This, That, and The Third Eye, No. 9 Cork Street, London, England
- 2022 - I'm Missing, Morán Morán, Mexico City, Mexico
- 2021 - Bad Picture of Me, Good Picture of Us, Matthew Brown, Los Angeles, CA
- 2021 - The Floor is Crooked, The Momentary, Bentonville, AR
- 2021 - Walk Wit Me, Hallwalls, Buffalo, NY
- 2021 - Palm Oil, Rum, Honey, Yellow Flowers, Brattleboro Museum & Art Center, VT
- 2020 - I Still Hoop, Charles Moffett Gallery, NY, NY
- 2019 - The Disappearing Man, Primary, Miami, FL
- 2018 - i see you with my eyes closed, Charles Moffett Gallery, NY, NY
- 2018 - Don't Look For Me, The Delaware Contemporary, Wilmington, DE
- 2017 - Hear, My Dear, Blackburn Gallery at the Elizabeth Foundation for the Arts, NY, NY
- 2016 - And I Will be the Same, Roswell Museum and Art Center, Roswell, NM
- 2015 - Sounds Familiar, Mariboe Gallery at the Peddie School, Hightstown, NJ
- 2015 - Supermane and the Hidden G, AC Institute, New York, NY
- 2014 - I Can Love You Better, Shin Gallery, New York, NY
- 2012 - S and 7 or 12, The Study at Yale, New Haven, CT
- 2010 - We'Il Take Manhattan, P.S.122 Classroom Gallery, New York, NY
- 2006 - We Fight but First We Dance, Go Fish Gallery, New York, NY
- 2004 - I Can Be A King, Home of the Artist, New York, NY

=== Selected group exhibitions ===
- 2025 - Beachum Family Collection, Yale Divinity School, New Haven, CT
- 2025 - Tomorrow is Already, Behind Us, Lyles & King, New York, NY
- 2025 - Longest Way Round, Charles Moffett Gallery, New York, NY
- 2024 - Personal Geographies, curated by Dulcina Abreu, Andrew Freeman Home, Bronx, NY
- 2024 - Personal Geographies, curated by Dulcina Abreu, Kilometro, San Juan, PR
- 2024 - Stop & Stare, curated by Genevieve Gaignard, UTA Artist Space, Atlanta, GA
- 2024 - Surrealism and US: Caribbean and African Diasporic Artists since 1940, Modern Art Museum of Fort Worth, Fort Worth, TX
- 2023 - Somos/We Are, Long Island Museum, Long Island, NY
- 2023 - Present '23: Building the Scantland Collection of the Columbus Museum of Art, Columbus Museum of Art, Columbus, OH
- 2023 - Dominicanx, Natura Ad Artem, Santo Domingo, RD
- 2021 - Un Estado De Gracia / A State of Grace, The Rudin Family Gallery at BAM, Brooklyn, NY
- 2020 - Laylah Ali and Kenny Rivero: Two Truths, Esther Massry Gallery at the College of Saint Rose, Albany, NY
- 2020 - Secret Storm, Winter Street Gallery, Edgartown, MA
- 2020 - This Sacred Vessel, Arsenal Contemporary, New York, NY
- 2020 - In The Time of, UTA Artist Space, Los Angeles, CA
- 2019 - Nostos, Matthew Brown Gallery, Los Angeles, CA
- 2019 - Painting is Its Own Country, The Harvey B. Gantt Center for African American Arts and Culture, Charlotte, NC
- 2019 - Downtown Painting, Curated by Alex Katz, Peter Freeman, Inc., New York, NY
- 2018 - You Are Who I Think You Think You Are, American Medium, New York, NY
- 2018 - The Lure of the Dark: Contemporary Painters Conjure the Night, MASS MoCA, North Adams, MA
- 2018 - Black Pulp!, African American Museum Museum at USF, Tampa, FL
- 2017 - Selections by Larry Ossei-Mensah, Elizabeth Dee Gallery, New York, NY
- 2017 - Uptown Triennial: Nasty Women, Bad Hombres, El Museo del Barrio, New York, NY
- 2017 - Spots, Dots, Pips, and Tiles: An Exhibition around the Game of Dominoes, Perez Art Museum, Miami, FL
- 2017 - Black Pulp!, Zikha Gallery at Wesleyan University, Middletown, CT
- 2017 - Black Pulp!, Contemporary Art Museum at USF, Tampa, FL
- 2016 - Spots, Dots, Pips, and Tiles: An Exhibition around the Game of Dominoes, Hunter East Harlem Gallery, New York, NY
- 2016 - Black Pulp!, Curated by William Villalongo and Mark Thomas Gibson, IPCNY, New York, NY
- 2016 - Self Portraits, Bravin Lee Programs, New York, NY
- 2015 - TXT: Art, Language, Media, Sugar Hill Children's Museum of Art & Storytelling, New York, NY
- 2015 - The Fire Next Time, Galerìa Leyendecker, Tenerife, Islas Canarias, España
- 2015 - Consequential Translations, Centro Cultural de España en Santo Domingo, Santo Domingo, Republica Dominicana
- 2015 - Long Story Short, curated by Karin Bravin, Trestle Gallery, Brooklyn, NY
- 2014 - Narratives of Self Exile/ Narativas del Auto Exilio, Curated by Miguel Luciano, Bronx Art Space, Bronx NY
- 2013 - La Bienal: Here is Where We Jump, curated by Rocio Aranda-Alvarado and Raul Zamudio, El Museo del Barrio, New York, NY
- 2012 - Eyes Off the Flag, Koki Arts and Motus Fort Gallery, Tokyo, Japan
- 2011 - Bosch Young Talent Show, co-curated by William Villalongo, Stedelijk Museum, s-Hertogenbosch, Netherlands
- 2009 - Octet, curated by Peter Hristoff and Susan Anker, Pera Museum, Istanbul, Turkey

== Awards and residencies ==
Rivero has been awarded a number of awards and residencies including Joan Mitchell Foundation Painters and Sculptors Grant (2018), Skowhegan School of Painting and Sculpture (2017), The Fountainhead Residency (2016), Rema Hort Mann Foundation Emerging Artist Grant (2015), Roswell Artist in Residence Program (2015–16), Lower Manhattan Cultural Council Workspace Program (2014–15), Robert Schoelkopf Memorial Travel Grant from Yale University (2011).
