= Klos =

Klos or KLOS may refer to:

- Klos (surname)
- Klos, Dibër, a town in eastern Albania
  - Harketari Klos KF, a defunct football club based in Klos, Dibër
- Klos, Elbasan, a village in central Albania
- Klos, Mallakastër, a village in south-central Albania
- Kłos, West Pomeranian Voivodeship, a village in Poland
- KLOS, a radio station in California
- Klos C – a ship used to smuggle arms
