= Closure =

Closure may refer to:

== Conceptual ==
=== Psychology ===
- Closure (psychology), the state of experiencing an emotional conclusion to a difficult life event
- Law of closure (Gestalt psychology), the perception of objects as complete rather than focusing on the gaps that the object might contain

=== Computer science ===
- Closure (computer programming), an abstraction binding a function to its scope
- Relational database model: Set-theoretic formulation and Armstrong's axioms for its use in database theory

=== Mathematics ===
- Closure (mathematics), the result of applying a closure operator
- Closure (topology), for a set, the smallest closed set containing that set

=== Philosophy ===
- Epistemic closure, a principle in epistemology
- Deductive closure, a principle in logic
- Cognitive closure, a principle in philosophy of mind
- Closure: A Short History of Everything, a philosophical book by Hilary Lawson

=== Sociology ===
- Closure (sociology)
- Closure, a concept in the social construction of technology

== Physical objects ==
- Closure (container) used to seal a bottle, jug, jar, can, or other container
  - Closure (wine bottle), a stopper
- Hook-and-eye closure

== Arts and entertainment ==
=== Film and television ===
- Straightheads, a 2007 British thriller film, US release title Closure
- Closure (2026 film), a 2026 documentary film
- "Closure" (8 Simple Rules episode), a 2005 television episode
- "Closure" (Agents of S.H.I.E.L.D.), a 2015 television episode
- "Closure" (Casualty), a 1986 television episode
- "Closure", a two-part episode, split between seasons 1 and 2 of Law and Order: SVU
- "Closure" (Raines), a 2007 television episode
- "Closure" (Shrinking), a 2023 television episode
- "Closure" (Tru Calling), a 2004 television episode
- "Closure" (The X-Files), a 2000 television episode

=== Music ===
- Closure (band), Canadian rock band
- Closure (video), a 1997 Nine Inch Nails video set

==== Albums and EPs ====
- Closure (Attila album), 2021 album by Attila
- Closure (Closure album), 2003 album by Closure
- Closure, 2004 EP by Everclear
- Closure (Integrity album), 2001 album by Integrity
- Closure (Spahn Ranch album), 2001
- Closure: Live, 2001 live album by Theatre of Tragedy

==== Songs ====
- "Closure", by Ab-Soul from These Days..., 2014
- "Closure", by Aly & AJ from Insomniatic, 2007
- "Closure", by Asking Alexandria from Reckless & Relentless, 2011
- "Closure", by Botch from The Unifying Themes of Sex, Death and Religion, 1997
- "Closure" (Cadet song), single by Cadet, 2017
- "Closure" (Chevelle song), by Chevelle from Wonder What's Next, 2002
- "Closure", by Chris Brown featuring H.E.R. from Breezy, 2022
- "Closure", by Divine Heresy from Bleed the Fifth, 2007
- "Closure", by Gabrielle from Always, 2007
- "Closure", single by Hayley Warner, 2015
- "Closure", by Hood from Outside Closer, 2005
- "Closure", by I Prevail from True Power, 2022
- "Closure", by Jack & Jack, 2018
- "Closure", by Maroon 5 from Red Pill Blues, 2017
- "Closure", by Opeth from Damnation, 2003
- "Closure", by PUP from Morbid Stuff, 2019
- "Closure" (Scarlett Belle song), single by Scarlett Belle, 2010
- "Closure", by Sonic Syndicate from Confessions, 2016
- "Closure", by The Story So Far from Under Soil and Dirt, 2011
- "Closure", by Taylor Swift from Evermore, 2020

=== Other arts and entertainment ===
- Closure (video game), a 2012 puzzle game
- Closure: A Short History of Everything, a philosophical book by Hilary Lawson
- Poetic closure, the sense of conclusion given at the end of a poem

== Other uses ==
- Closure or cloture, a motion in parliamentary procedure to bring debate to a quick end
- Closure (business), the process by which an organization ceases operations
- Closure (atmospheric science), a type of experiment in aerosol and cloud studies
- Google Closure Tools, a set of tools for web development

== See also ==
- "C7osure (You Like)", a 2019 song by Lil Nas X
- Clozure, an implementation of Common Lisp
- Clojure, a dialect of Lisp symbiotic with the Java platform
