= Clos =

Clos may refer to:

== People ==
- Clos (surname)

== Other uses ==
- CLOS (command line-of-sight), a method of guiding a missile to its intended target
- Clos network, a kind of multistage switching network
- Clos (vineyard), a walled vineyard; used in France, Germany and California
- Common Lisp Object System (CLOS)
