= Closing time =

Closing time may refer to:

== Books ==
- Closing Time (novel), a 1994 novel and sequel to Catch-22 by Joseph Heller
- Closing Time: The True Story of the Goodbar Murder, a 1977 book by Lacey Fosburgh
- "Closing Time", a short story by Neil Gaiman included in the 2006 collection Fragile Things

== Music ==
- Closing Time (album), a 1973 album by Tom Waits, or the title song
- "Closing Time" (Deacon Blue song), 1991
- "Closing Time" (Hole song), 1993
- "Closing Time" (Semisonic song), 1998
- "Closing Time", a song by Leonard Cohen from The Future, 1992
- "Closing Time", a song by Lyle Lovett from Lyle Lovett, 1986
- "Closing Time", a song by Tyler Joe Miller from Spillin' My Truth, 2023
- "Lounge (Closing Time)", a song by Modest Mouse from The Lonesome Crowded West, 1997

== Television ==
- "Closing Time" (Beavis and Butt-head)
- "Closing Time" (Doctor Who)
- "Closing Time" (Two Pints of Lager and a Packet of Crisps)

== See also ==
- Closing time effect
- Business hours
- Last call (disambiguation)
