= Closed loop =

Closed loop or closed-loop may refer to:

== Mathematics ==
- Loop (topology), topological path whose initial point is equal to its terminal point
- Closed curve, the image of a continuous mapping of a circle

== Technology ==
- Closed-loop controller, control law that uses knowledge of the state or output
  - Closed-loop transfer function, mathematical function describing the net result of the effects of a feedback control loop on the input signal to the plant under control
  - Electronic feedback loop
  - Proportional–integral–derivative controller (PID), type of feedback controller using three terms (P, I, and D)
- Closed ecological system, ecosystem that does not exchange matter with the exterior
- Closed-loop communication, communication technique in which every received message is confirmed by the sender
- Ecological sanitation systems (or ecosan), approach to sanitation provision which aims to safely reuse excreta in agriculture

== Other uses ==
- Circular economy, with materials recycled
- Closed time loop, a paradox of time travel
- Knot loop, in a knot
