= Closing statement =

Closing statement may refer to:

- Closing argument, or "summation", the concluding statement of each party's counsel in a court case
- Closing statement (real estate), a document describing a real estate transaction
- Closing statement (debate), the concluding statement in a debate
