= Elmer Close =

American politician

Member of the New Hampshire House of Representatives from the Cheshire 15th district
- In office 1972–1980

Personal details
- Born: July 16, 1937 Toledo, Ohio, U.S.
- Died: September 10, 2019 (aged 82) Peterborough, New Hampshire, U.S.
- Party: Republican
- Education: Harvard College (BA); Harvard Law School (JD)

Elmer Close (July 16, 1937 – September 10, 2019), also known as E.H. Close, was a Republican politician who served in the New Hampshire House of Representatives from 1972 to 1980 where he represented the Cheshire 15th district.
