= Felix Klos =

American-Dutch politician (born 1992)

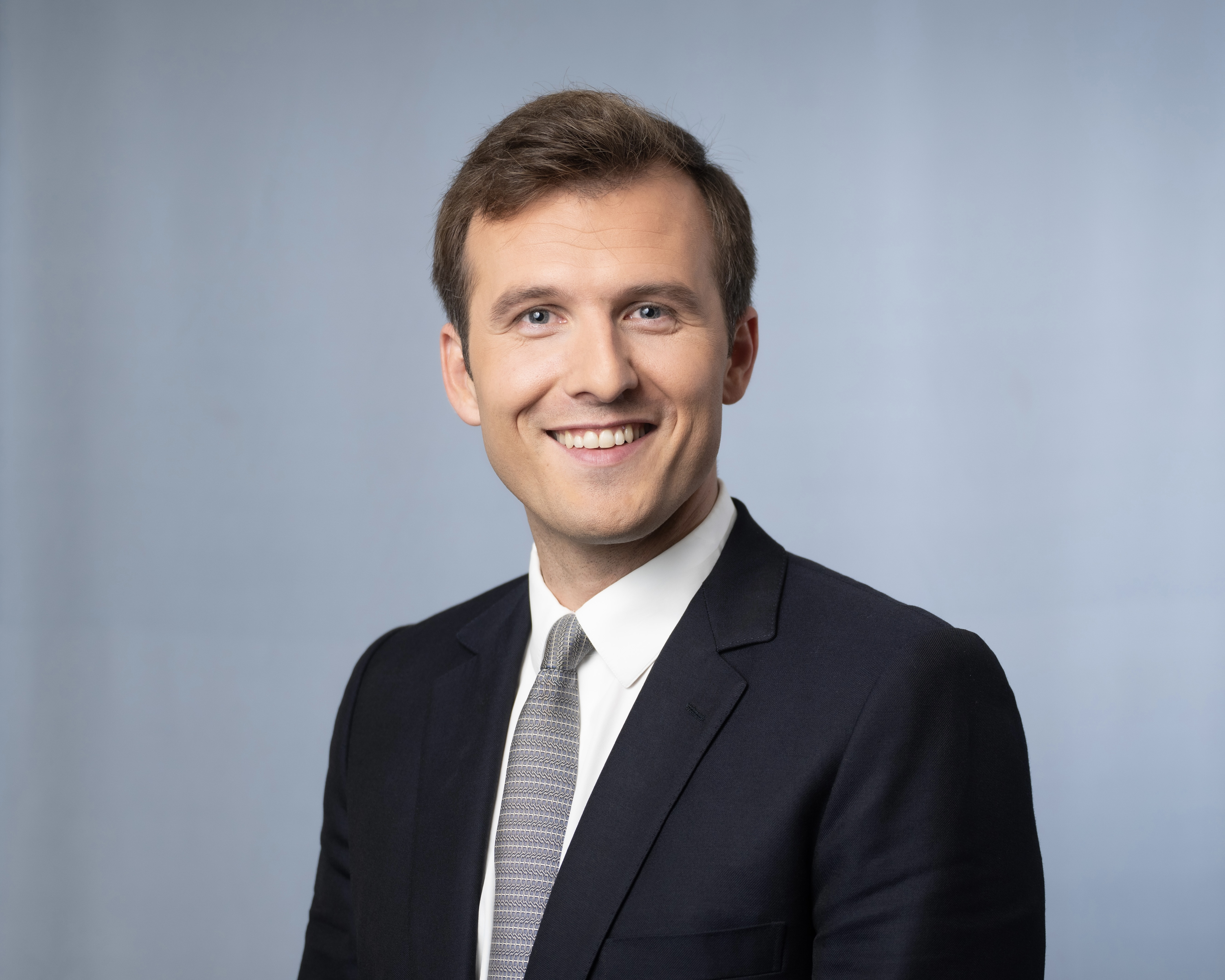

Member of the House of Representatives
- Incumbent
- Assumed office 12 November 2025

Personal details
- Born: Felix Constantijn Olivier Klos; 3 March 1992 (age 34) Deventer, Netherlands
- Citizenship: Netherlands; United States
- Party: D66 (since 2012)
- Education: Gemeentelijk Gymnasium Hilversum
- Alma mater: Lincoln College, Oxford; Middlebury College

Felix Constantijn Olivier Klos (3 March 1992) is a Dutch-American historian, political scientist, and politician of the Democrats 66 (D66).

== Education ==
Klos was educated at Lincoln College at the University of Oxford, and Middlebury College, Vermont. His academic work has focused on European integration. During his studies, he served as a Legislative Intern in the United States Senate, and as an International Office Intern for the Dutch social liberal party Democrats 66.

== Political career ==
In 2019, Klos was a candidate for D66 in the European Parliament elections. In the run-up to the elections he made a bid for delegation leader for D66, but was not elected. Sophie in 't Veld was chosen as delegation leader. He was a candidate for the party in the 2025 parliamentary election. D66's election victory secured his seat in parliament.

== Publications ==
Klos is the author of Churchill on Europe: The Untold Story of Churchill's European Project (London, IB Tauris, June 2016) and Winston Churchill – Father of Europe (Amsterdam, 2016, Hollands Diep). The Guardian described the book as "scintillating" and observed that it "shows very persuasively how Churchill supported a postwar union of European states and wanted Britain to play a leading part in it.". In addition to the books Klos published a number of newspaper and magazine articles regarding Churchill's European legacy in the perspective of the UK EU referendum in June 2016.
