= Thomas Close =

English antiquarian and archeologist

Thomas Close FSA (12 February 1796 – 25 January 1881) was an English antiquarian and archaeologist.

== Biography ==
Thomas Close was born in Manchester on 12 February 1796 to John Close, a merchant of the city, and his wife, Mary.

Close was a keen antiquarian and archeologist, engaging mostly in heraldic and genealogical research. Close created several illuminated pedigrees of royal and noble families, including some elaborate ones of the Tattershall and Wake families. He authored a work on the Saxon religious foundation, St Mary's Church, Nottingham, entitled St. Mary's Church, Nottingham: Its Probable Architect and Benefactors: With Remarks on the Heraldic Window Described by Thoroton (Nottingham, 1866). Close penned an unpublished work on Edward Hyde, 1st Earl of Clarendon's History of the Rebellion, which is now held at the National Art Library, in the Victoria and Albert Museum.

Close was the member of several societies and organisations. On 10 May 1855, he was made a Fellow of the Society of Antiquaries. In 1836, he was one of the founders and original members of the Reform Club - a London-based, Whig gentleman's club - and was the Grand Master of the Masonic province of Nottingham. Close was also a chevalier of the honorary Belgian Order of Leopold, and a member of several other foreign orders. Close was vice-president of his local Nottingham British Association for the Advancement of Science in 1866.

Close's wife died on 22 January 1881, and, three days later, on 25 January, Close died at his home in St James's Street, Nottingham. Close left less than £60,000 in his will.
