= Closure (atmospheric science) =

A closure experiment in atmospheric science is a combination of different measurement techniques to describe the current state of the investigated system as fully as possible, and to find inaccuracies in one or some of the methods involved. The comparison of different types of measurement often involves model calculations, which may also be tested in this process.

A common example for closure experiments are aerosol studies. Aerosols can be studied from space, from aircraft, and from the surface. The different properties of aerosols (chemical composition, particle size, particle number concentration, optical absorptivity, thermal emissivity, index of refraction, pattern of light scattering, etc.) require very different kinds of measurement techniques. Different instruments have been developed to perform each technique, and researchers usually specialize in one or a few of them. Due to the logistic efforts required to bring different groups of researchers with different measurement techniques together, such experiments stand out among routine experiments that are more focused on one or a few techniques and have fewer participants.

An aerosol closure experiment might look like this:

- Individual aerosol particles are sampled, and their size and shape are determined under an electron microscope;
- A lidar emits a laser beam into the aerosol plume and detects the backscatter signal;
- An aerosol flow is led through optical detectors that record the size distribution of the particles;
- The sunlight attenuated by the aerosol is measured by a Sun photometer, yielding the optical depth of the aerosol layer;
- the spectral absorption of sunlight, as well as the scattering properties of the aerosol are measured by spectrometers;
- The extent and total reflectivity of the aerosol plume are observed by a satellite radiometer.

Additionally, measurements can be performed within the plume or outside, by means of remote sensing, from the surface, from aircraft, and from satellites in space. Different viewing geometries again introduce complexity, which can be assessed in closure experiments.

Algorithms exist, for example, to predict the optical properties from a given particle shape, size distribution, and index of refraction. Closure is achieved if the predictions of such an algorithm agree (within the limits of measurement uncertainty) with the optical properties that have been derived from the independent radiation measurements; if the lidar information about the vertical distribution of the aerosol sums up to the total optical depth determined by the sun photometer; etc.
