= Mike Kloser =

American mountain biker

Personal information
- Born: December 31, 1959 (age 66) Dubuque, Iowa, U.S.

Cycling career
- Sport: Cycling
- Discipline: Mountain bike
- Role: Rider
- Rider type: Downhill
Medal record
Representing United States
Mountain bike racing
World Championships
Silver medal – second place	1990 Durango	Downhill

Mike Kloser (born December 31, 1959) is an American former professional downhill and cross-country mountain biker. He most notably finished second at the 1990 UCI Downhill World Championships. He also won the cross-country world championships in 1988 before it was recognized by the UCI.

After retiring from cycling, he competed in the duathlon and winter triathlon.

He was inducted into the Mountain Bike Hall of Fame in 2002.

== Personal life ==
He resides in Vail, Colorado with his wife, Emily, and their children Heidi and Christian.
