= Clos (surname) =

Clos is a surname. Notable people with the surname include:

- Dani Clos (born 1988), Spanish racing driver
- Dominique Clos (1821–1908), French botanist
- Joan Clos (born 1949), Spanish politician
- Paco Clos (born 1960), Spanish footballer
