= Klose =

Klose is a surname of German, Silesian, and West Slavic origins, and may refer to

- Adolf Klose (1844–1923), German railroad engineer and inventor
- Alfred Klose (1895–1953), German mathematician
- Anastasia Klose (born 1978), Australian artist
- Annika Klose (born 1992), German politician
- Bob Klose (born 1945), British musician and photographer
- Friedrich Klose (1862–1942), German composer
- Hans-Ulrich Klose (1937–2023), German politician (SPD)
- Harald Klose (1945–2025), German footballer
- Holger Klose (born 1972), German hammer thrower
- Hyacinthe Klosé (1808–1880), French composer and inventor of the Böhm clarinet system
- Jann Klose, German-born singer, songwriter, producer
- John Klose, American politician
- Josef Klose (born 1947), Polish football player
- Kai Klose (born 1973), German politician
- Kevin Klose (1940–2026), American public radio CEO
- Kirsten Klose (born 1977), German hammer thrower
- Margarete Klose (1899–1968), German opera singer (contralto)
- Miroslav Klose (born 1978), German footballer
- Samuel Gottlieb Klose, German Lutheran missionary - see German Australians#German missionaries
- Timm Klose (born 1988), Swiss footballer

== See also ==
- Kut Klose, R&B group
- Close (disambiguation)
