= Yashua Klos =

American visual artist (born 1977)

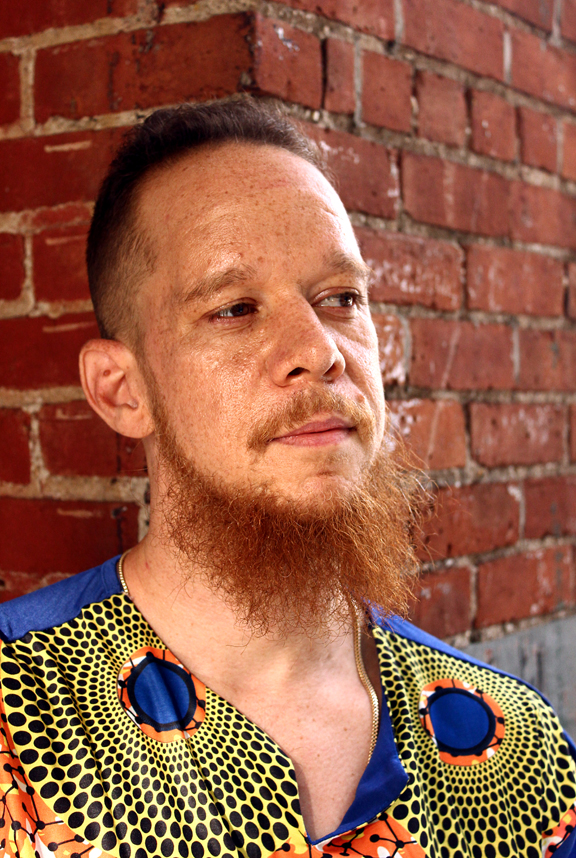
- Yashua Klos, 2018
- Born: 1977 (age 48–49); Chicago, Illinois, U.S.
- Education: Northern Illinois University (BFA), Atelier Neo Medici, Hunter College (MFA)
- Occupations: Visual artist, educator
- Known for: Printmaking, sculpture, collage
- Website: yashuaklos.net

Yashua Klos (born 1977) is an American visual artist and educator. He is known for his large-scale collage and woodcut works, which address issues of identity, race, memory and community. Klos lives in The Bronx, and has lived in Brooklyn in New York City.

== Early life and education ==
Klos was born in 1977, in Chicago, Illinois, where he grew up on Chicago's South Side and was raised by his single mother. Klos is biracial, his mother is white, and his father is black. Klos's artwork is influenced by his childhood neighborhood, and his family. In adulthood, he was reunited with his paternal family in Detroit after a genetic test was matched with his cousin.

He received a BFA degree in 2000 at Northern Illinois University. Klos then studied abroad in 2002 in Monflanquin, France, where he investigated renaissance painting techniques at Atelier Neo Medici. He received a MFA degree in 2009 at Hunter College in New York City.

== Art ==
His work commonly explores themes surrounding African-American identity in contemporary society. Through his large-scale collages, Klos challenges notions of marginalization, masculinity, and urban mythology. He paints portraits of people from Chicago's South Side, highlighting narratives of suppression, denial, and pain associated with the vulnerability experienced in black communities. There was a "stoicism" among the "black folks" Klos witnessed, an element he attempts to unpack by studying the behavioral nature of adapting and thriving. Overall, he challenges conventions often attached to the African-American man.

Klos teaches at Hunter College and Parsons School of Design in New York City. His work is in museum collections, including at the Studio Museum in Harlem.

=== Printmaking ===
In his earlier works, Klos was known for printing giant woodcuts on large stretches of muslin. His interest in the technique grew out of the many African-American activists who employed it during the mid-20th century, such as Charles W. White, Elizabeth Catlett, and Emily Douglas. By cutting and etching using a series of erratic, jagged marks, he imitates this "kinetic devotion to image-making" that grounds this element of humanity he desires to achieve.

=== Collage ===
Klos's collages derive from his practice as a printmaker. Using a personalized approach, he creates swatches and samples of textures by hand-carving and inking woodblock prints to create a library of source material. By piecing and arranging a selection of patterns, they are layered on top of a pencil blueprint to create a complete portrait. His ideas of memory and distortion are demonstrated by the manifestation of fractured impressions and angled perspectives. Klos views collage as more than just a technique, but more a "metaphor for the fragmentation of African-American identity".

=== Sculpture ===
Klos references earthly materials, physical mediums he views as strong yet vulnerable over the passage of time. He associates timelessness to ancient monuments, a concept he applies to his sculptures to communicate the "monumentality of a culture's identity and relationship to time". Often, he incorporates materials leftover from urban renewal, such as milk crates, bricks, and wooden beams. The use of these mediums suggest Klos' desire to construct an identity relevant to his background.

== Exhibitions ==
- 2018: Go Figure, The Pizzuti Collection, Columbus, Ohio
- 2017: Everyday Anomaly, WHATIFTHEWORLD, Cape Town, South Africa
- 2017: Art on the Vine, presented by The Agora Culture, Edgartown, MA
- 2017: Face to Face: Los Angeles Collects Portraiture, California African American Museum, Los Angeles, CA
- 2017: Give Us the Vote, ArtsWestchester, White Plains, NY
- 2016: Black Pulp!, The International Print Center, New York, NY
- 2016, September: Galerie Anne DeVillepoix, Blank Black, Paris, France
- 2016, September: Papillon Art, Yashua Klos: How to Hide in the Wind, Los Angeles CA
- 2015: To Be Young, Gifted, and Black, curated by Hank Willis Thomas, Goodman Gallery, Johannesburg, South Africa
- 2015: Broken English, curated by Kim Stern, Tyburn Gallery, London, UK
- 2015, September: Jack Tilton Gallery, As Below, So Above, New York, NY
- 2014, February: Carnegie Mellon University, Draw 2014 Symposium, Pittsburgh, PA
- 2014, November: Opa Locka ARC, In Plain Sight, Opa-Locka, FL
- 2013, March: Jack Tilton Gallery, We Come Undone, New York, NY
- 2012, October: Memphis College of Art, Singular Masses, Memphis, TN
- 2012: Weatherspoon Museum, Art on Paper, Greensboro, NC
- 2012, November: Studio Museum in Harlem, Fore, New York, NY
- 2012: Dodge Gallery, Bigger Than Shadows, New York NY
- 2011, June: Kravetz Wehby, Paperwork, New York, NY
- 2010, July: Scaramouche Gallery, Lush Life, New York, NY
- 2010, September: Tilton Gallery, ELSE, New York, NY
- 2010, October: Catskill Art Society, Utopia and Wallpaper, Livingston Manor, NY
- 2009, January: Museum of Science and Industry, Black Creativity 09, Chicago, IL
- 2009, June: Hunterdon Museum of Art, Up and Coming, Clinton, NJ
- 2008, February: Rush Arts Gallery, Garveyism, New York, NY
- 2008, August: Port Authority Bus Terminal, The Mt. Rushmore Drawings, New York NY
- 2006, February: The Abrons Art Center, Inner Visions, New York, NY
- 2006, September: Deitch Projects, Deitch Art Parade, New York, NY

== Awards and residencies ==
- NYFA Grant, 2015
- Joan Mitchell Fellowship, 2014
- Skowhegan School of Painting and Sculpture, 2005
- Bemis Center for Contemporary Arts
- Vermont Studio Center
