= Alexandria Smith =

American artist

- Born: Bronx, New York, U.S.
- Education: Parsons The New School for Design; New York University; Syracuse University
- Known for: Contemporary Art
- Website: www.alexandriasmith.com

Alexandria Smith is an American mixed-media visual artist based in London and New York City. She is currently the head of painting at the Royal College of Art.

Smith was a co-organizer of the collective Black Women Artists for Black Lives Matter from 2016 to 2017. The collective, which consists of more than 100 black women artists, held a public event at the New Museum in NYC in 2016. Smith was quoted as saying, "I was in the company of women who wanted to use their gifts to instigate change, to let our humanity be seen and heard despite what others may believe. I know our work is not done and that this collective will continue to bring about healing and work against the grain in other iterations at other institutions. I look forward to continuing to help carry that torch. Black Women Artists for Black Lives Matter has re-instilled in me a belief in our abilities as Black women artists to be nurturing, compassionate, genuine, and powerful by any means necessary."

Smith earned her BFA in Illustration from Syracuse University, her MA in Art Education from New York University and an MFA in Fine Arts from Parsons The New School for Design.

== Selected exhibitions ==
Throughout her career, Smith has had solo exhibitions at the Queens Museum, Boston University's Stone Gallery, and The Union for Contemporary Art in Omaha, NE. Monuments To An Effigy, Smith's 2019 exhibition at the Queens Museum, focused on the Old Town of Flushing Burial Ground, which was a cemetery for African Americans and Native Americans during the 1800s and paved over by the Park Department in the 1930s. Smith's project centered on remembering the women buried at this site through music, poetry and installation, as only four graves were marked, and all of them men. Try a Little Tenderness, Smith's 2017 exhibition at The Union, consisted of paintings about Black Identity and the female body.

Smith has an upcoming solo exhibition and site-specific commission for July 2021 titled Memoirs of a Ghost Girlhood: a Black Girl’s Window at the Courier Museum (Manchester, New Hampshire).

== Awards and residencies ==
- Queens Museum/Jerome Foundation Fellowship (2018/19)
- Pollock-Krasner Foundation Grant
- Virginia A. Myers Fellowship at the University of Iowa
- Fine Arts Work Center Fellowship (2013–2015)
- Fountainhead Residency
- MacDowell Colony (2018)
- Bemis Center (2018)
- Yaddo
- LMCC Process Space Residency
- Skowhegan School of Painting and Sculpture (2015)
