= Closure (business) =

Business closure is the term used to refer to when a business ceases operations. While the term is often associated with the failure of a commercial enterprise, businesses may also close because the owners have sold it at a higher value than what they invested in it. Entrepreneurs may close a business for personal reasons, such as retirement or moving into full-time employment themselves.

== Reasons for closure ==
Closure may be the result of a bankruptcy, where the organization lacks sufficient funds to continue operations, as a result of the proprietor of the business dying, as a result of a business being purchased by another organization (or a competitor) and shut down as superfluous, or because it is the non-surviving entity in a corporate merger. A closure may occur because the purpose for which the organization was created is no longer necessary.

While a closure is typically of a business or a non-profit organization, any entity which is created by human beings can be subject to a closure, from a single church to a whole religion, up to and including an entire country if, for some reason, it ceases to exist.

Closures are of two types, voluntary or involuntary. Voluntary closures of organizations are much rarer than involuntary ones, as, in the absence of some change making operations impossible or unnecessary, most operations will continue until something happens that causes a change requiring this situation.

The most common form of voluntary closure would be when those involved in an organization such as a social club, a band, or other non-profit organization decide to cease operating. Once the organization has paid any outstanding debts and completed any pending operations, closure may simply mean that the organization ceases to exist.

If an organization has debts that cannot be paid, it may be necessary to perform a liquidation of its assets. If there is anything left after the assets are converted to cash, in the case of a for-profit organization, the remainder is distributed to the stockholders; in the case of a non-profit, by law any remaining assets must be distributed to another non-profit.

If an organization has more debts than assets, it may have to declare bankruptcy. If the organization is viable, it may reorganizes itself as a result of the bankruptcy and continue operations. If it is not viable for the business to continue operating, then a closure occurs through a bankruptcy liquidation: its assets are liquidated, the creditors are paid from whatever assets could be liquidated, and the business ceases operations.

== Examples ==
Possibly the largest "closure" in history (but more closely analogous to a demerger) was the split of the Soviet Union into its constituent countries. In comparison, the end of East Germany can be considered a merger rather than a closure as West Germany assumed all of the assets and liabilities of East Germany. The end of the Soviet Union was the equivalent of a closure through a bankruptcy liquidation, because while Russia assumed most of the assets and responsibilities of the former Soviet Union, it did not assume all of them. There have been issues over who is responsible for unpaid parking tickets accumulated by motor vehicles operated on behalf of diplomatic missions operated by the former Soviet Union in other countries, as Russia claims it is not responsible for them.

Several major business closures include the bankruptcy of the Penn Central railroad, the Enron scandals, and MCI Worldcom's bankruptcy and eventual merger into Verizon.
