= William Villalongo =

American visual artist (born 1975)

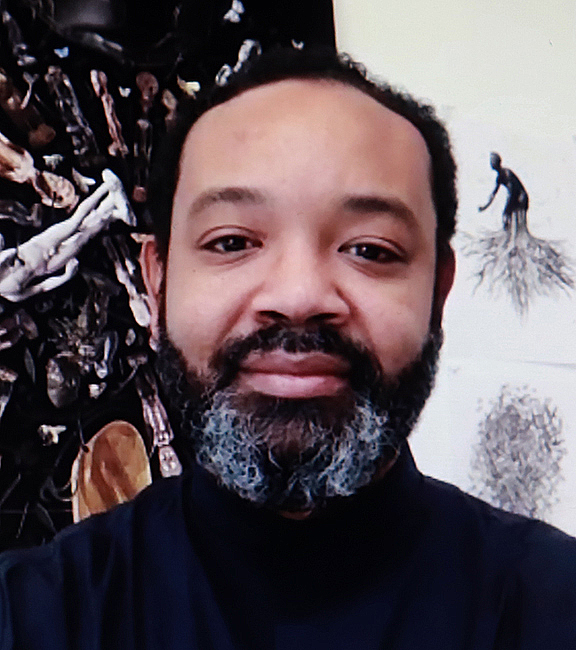
- Born: December 14, 1975 (age 50); Hollywood, Florida, U.S.
- Education: The Cooper Union, Tyler School of Art
- Known for: Painting, printmaking, sculpture, and installation art

William Villalongo (born 1975) is an American artist working in painting, printmaking, sculpture, and installation art. Based in Brooklyn, New York, Villalongo is an associate professor at the Cooper Union School of Art in New York.

== Early life and education ==
Villalongo was born in Hollywood, Florida, to a Puerto Rican father and African-American mother. His parents separated when he was a young child and he was raised in Bridgeton, New Jersey. Villalongo received his Bachelor of Fine Arts from The Cooper Union for the Advancement of Science and Art in 1999. He furthered his education by receiving his Masters of Fine Art from the Tyler School of Art at Temple University in 2001.

== Influences ==
Villallongo’s work typically focuses on the politics of historical erasure, with a particular focus on the artistic reassessment of Western, American, and African Art histories. The artist states that his intention toward these reassessments evolves in part from the West's histories of "taking African art objects and placing them on the side of the sofa to decorate, although that is not their purpose. We are obsessed with fitting a narrative, a story."

His work engages with the black body, examining the influence of socialization, history, dress and speech. Commenting on his reexamination of the power dynamics of history and representation, Villalongo has posited, "[The relationship is] problematic and interesting, and I wanted to think about how to use it and tell a story." In many of the artist's portraits, bodies emerge from "a tumult of white negative space cut out of black velour paper," in ways that evoke leaves, branches, feathers, or slashes.

== Professional career ==
Villalongo has exhibited throughout the United States. His solo exhibitions include the University of Connecticut Contemporary Art Galleries; Rosenwald-Wolf Gallery at University of the Arts Philadelphia; Scarfone-Hartley Gallery at the University of Tampa, Florida, and the Harvey B. Gantt Center for African-American Arts and Culture in Charlotte, North Carolina.

His work was included in a major gift to the permanent collection of the Studio Museum in Harlem in 2018 by collector Peggy Cooper Cafritz. Villalongo is one of 42 artists who contributed works to a record-setting Sotheby's auction in support of the construction of a new building for the Studio Museum, to be located on 125th Street. His work has been featured in group exhibitions at El Museo del Barrio in New York City; the Weatherspoon Art Museum in Greensboro, North Carolina; the Museum of Contemporary Art Cleveland; and, Elizabeth Foundation for the Arts, New York City. The artist’s work can be found in collections of the Baltimore Museum of Art; Denver Art Museum; Pennsylvania Academy of Fine Arts; Princeton University Art Museum; Rose Art Museum, Brandeis University; Studio Museum in Harlem, NYC; Toledo Museum of Art; Weatherspoon Museum of Art, Greensboro; Whitney Museum of American Art; and the Yale University Art Gallery among others. He has also had work published in ESOPUS 22.

Villalongo has completed residencies at Skowhegan School of Painting and Sculpture; The Studio Museum in Harlem, New York; Studio-f at the University of Tampa, Florida; the Hermitage Artist Retreat; and, the Fountainhead in Miami, Florida.

He is represented by Susan Inglett Gallery, New York.

=== Curatorial work: Black Pulp! ===
In 2016, Villalongo co-curated Black Pulp!, a traveling exhibition of nearly a century's worth of Black image production by Black publishers, Black artists and by non-Black artists, with fellow artist Mark Thomas Gibson. The exhibition was named for pulp, a cheap paper that was used to inexpensively print newspapers, books, leaflets, and other printed ephemera in the 19th and 20th centuries and consequently made mass communication possible. During these centuries, the images of African-Americans that appeared in pulp publications produced and distributed by white Americans were often racist. As a consequence, "black pulp" was used by black communities to combat these racist portrayals and to facilitate communication within and about black identity.

Black Pulp! presented black pulp media from the Harlem Renaissance and its succeeding decades that offered up "windows into the darker, erotic, satirical, and more absurd recesses of the Black popular imagination; while underscoring important debates around personhood and identity." The collection of works, wrote William Villalongo in the exhibition's catalogue, "highlight[ed] historical efforts within the medium to rebuff derogatory image culture with exceptional wit, beauty, and humor, to provide emerging, nuanced perspective on black humanity." In a 2016 interview for The Huffington Post, Villalongo expressed his hope that the exhibition would allow people to "see an expanded view of the Black subject in general, but also the complex and immense challenge of historical efforts of Black folk to own and steward their own image." A large portion of the historical works and print media displayed in the exhibition came from collections at the Schomburg Center for Research in Black Culture, the Library of Congress, the Stuart A. Rose Manuscript, Archives, and Rare Book Library at Emory University, EBay, and the personal collections of Villalongo and Gibson.

Black Pulp! garnered critical attention, particularly because of its focus and attention to black experience and identity.

== Awards ==
- 2005, Louis Comfort Tiffany Award
- 2006, Joan Mitchell Foundation Painters & Sculptor's Grant
- 2021-2022, American Academy in Rome Fellow
