= Wysing Arts Centre =

Arts centre in South Cambridgeshire

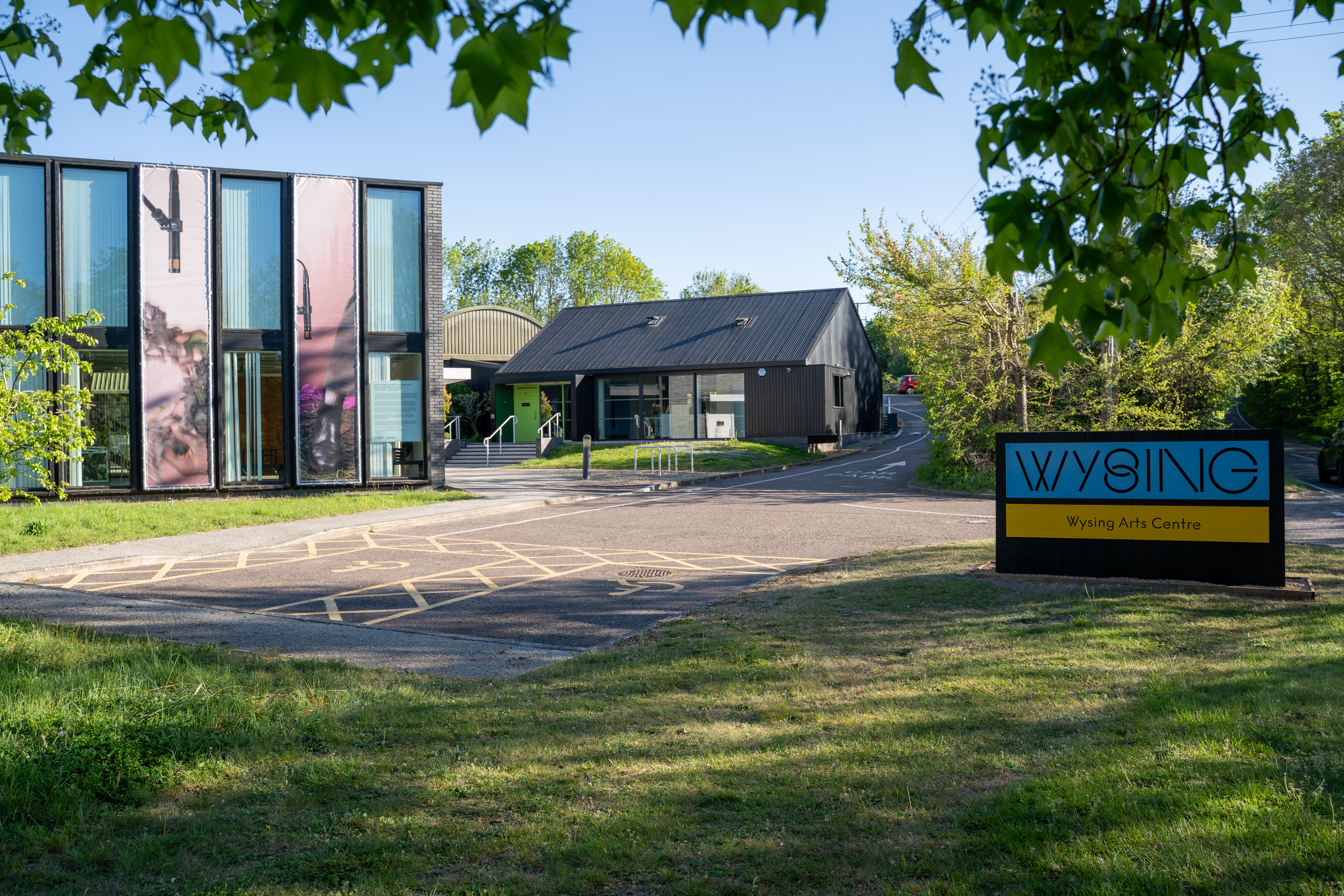
- Wysing Arts Centre, Cambridgeshire. Featuring 2026 Brooks Building commission 'Fox Road' by Appau Jnr Boakye-Yiadom (left). Photo: Wysing.

- Location within Cambridgeshire
- Established: 1989
- Location: Bourn, Cambridgeshire, England
- Coordinates: 52.18°N 0.07°W
- Director: Rosie Cooper
- Curator: Ruth Dorber
- Website: www.wysing.art

Wysing Arts Centre is a contemporary arts residency centre and campus for artistic production, experimentation and learning in South Cambridgeshire, England. The centre was established in 1989 and completed a £1.7 million capital development project in 2008. Across the eleven-acre site the centre holds ten buildings, including 24 low-cost artists' studios, a live-work space, specialist new media facilities, a large gallery, education facilities, a recording studio, a ceramics studio and a 17th-century grade II listed farmhouse which is used as accommodation for residencies and retreats. The main focus of the centre's activities is the international residency programme, but it also hosts temporary exhibitions, retreats, a programme for young artists, semi-permanent sculptural and architectural commissions and works on offsite projects with many other institutions nationally and internationally. It is a registered charity under English law.

In 2010 Wysing was invited to join Plus Tate; one of only two of the twenty organisations in the network whose work is focused on process and production rather than on the presentation of extant works. Alongside Plus Tate, Wysing has a number of partnerships in place with organisations including the Royal College of Art, the Royal Society of Arts, the British Council, the Contemporary Art Society, Anglia Ruskin University, Cambridge University and the Contemporary Visual Arts Network.

== History ==
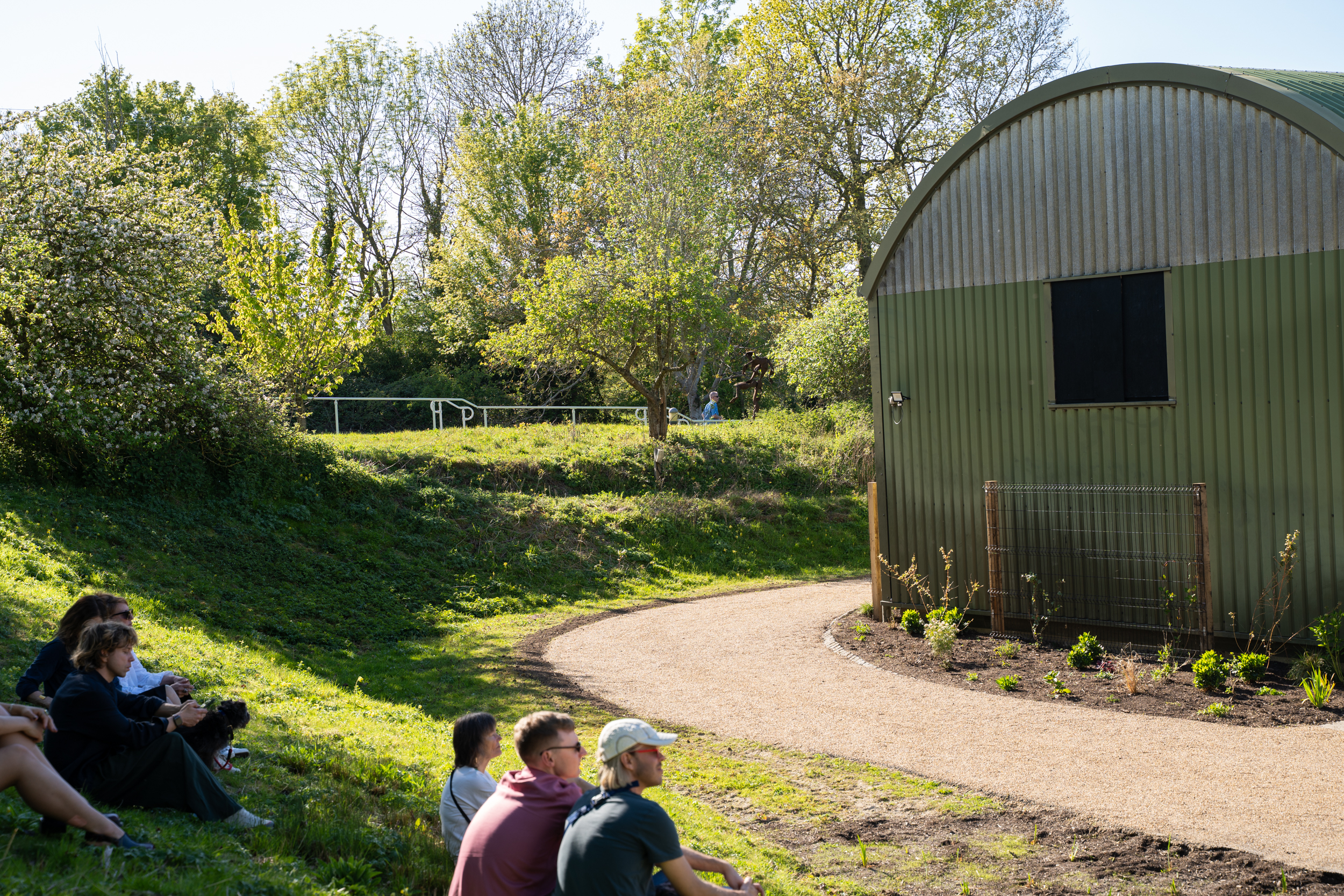
Wysing Arts Centre, site relaunch, April 2026. Photo: Wysing.

Wysing was created in 1989 by founders Jenny and Terry Brooks and artists Annie and Age Bunnetat.

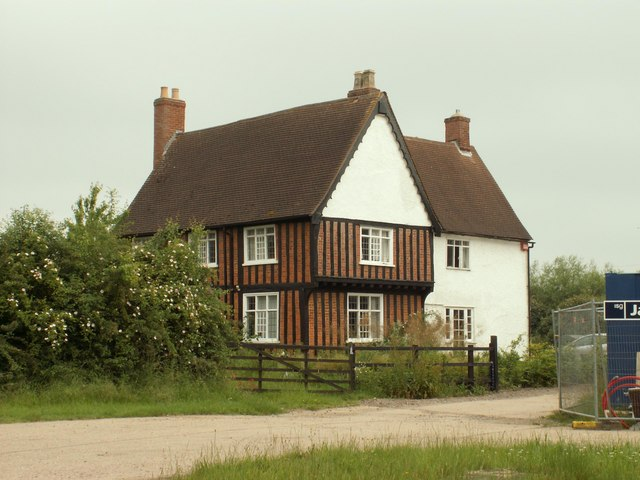
Wysing Grange Farmhouse, Wysing Arts Centre in 2007

The group had a vision of an organisation which would provide space, time, funding and a creative environment to support visual arts practice without pre-defined outcomes. They found a suitable site at a former dairy farm in Cambridgeshire, restored its 17th-century farmhouse, and transformed old farm buildings into studios and a gallery space.

== Selected Residencies 2009–2020 ==
- Convention T (2013) – including artists Anna Barham, James Beckett, Michael Dean, Cécile B. Evans, David Osbaldeston, Seb Patane, Charlotte Prodger and Florian Roithmayr
- The Forest (2012) – including artists Jonathan Baldock, Edwin Burdis, Emma Hart and Jess Flood-Paddock, and musician Luke Abbott
- The Mirror (2012) – including artists Ed Atkins, Nicolas Deshayes, Philomene Pirecki and Elizabeth Price
- The Cosmos (2012) – Salvatore Arancio, Flora Parrott, Nilsson Pflugfelder and Stuart Whipps
- The Department of Overlooked Histories (2011) – including artists An Endless Supply, Ruth Beale, Karin Kihlberg & Reuben Henry and Emma Smith
- The Department of Psychedelic Studies (2011) – including artists Mark Essen, Hilary Koob-Sassen, Kate Owens, Damien Roach
- The Department of Wrong Answers (2011) – including artists Rob Filby, Francesco Pedraglio & Laure Prouvost, Giles Round and Cally Spooner
- The Camp For Improbable Thinking (2010) – including artists Asli Cavusoglu, Andy Holden, Fabiano Marques, Julie Myers, Emily Rosamond and Bedwyr Williams
- Communities under Construction (2009) – including artists A Kassen, Folke Köbberling and Martin Kaltwasser, N55, Public Works, Townley and Bradby and Helen Stratford Wysing Polyphonic A specific annual residency was the Wysing Polyphonic also known as the Annual Music Festival, these included:
- Space-Time: the Multiverse (2015) including artists: The Fish Police, Ravioli Me Away, Joey Fourr, Bamboo and stage curated by Electra.
- 2016: David Toop with Sylvia Hallett, Elaine Mitchener & Roger Turner, Jenny Moore with Ela Barczewski, Kate Bones, Phil Brunner, Simon Clark, Mario D'Agostino, Andrew Kershaw, Sophie Mallet, Fay Nicholson, Sophie Ramsay, Heloise Tunstall-Behrens and Raimond Wong, Richard Dawson, Larry Achiampong and David Blandy
- Somerset House Studios (2019)
- The Ungoverned (guest curated by Anne Duffau) (2020) – including artists Maëva Berthelot, Whiskey Chow, CRYSTALLMESS, Tanaka Fuego, Hannah Catherine Jones, Rachel Long, LYZZA, mobilegirl, Coby Sey and audio research group AUDINT
- Under Ether (guest curated by Anne Duffau) (2021) - including artists CAMPerVAN, FAUZIA, Ignota: MJ Harding & Nisha Ramayya, Juliet Jacques, Marissa Malik & Yeshe Bahamon-Beesley, object blue, Space Afrika, YA YA Bones and Ain Bailey.

== Selected Exhibitions 2012–2013 ==
- Jonathan Baldock – A Strange Cross Between a Butchers Shop and a Nightclub, 2013
- Relatively Absolute – including artists Luke Abbott, Salvatore Arancio, Ed Atkins, Jonathan Baldock, Edwin Burdis, Patrick Coyle, Nicolas Deshayes, Jess Flood-Paddock, Emma Hart, Nilsson Pflugfelder, Flora Parrott, Philomene Pirecki, Elizabeth Price and Stuart Whipps, 2013
- Recollect including artists Better Futures Forever, Jackie Chettur, Phil Coy, Sean Edwards, Karin Kihlberg & Reuben Henry, Una Knox, Rosie Pedlow & Joe King, 2012
- The Starry Rubric Set – including artists Marjolijn DijkmAn, Ruth Beale, Nicholas Deshayes, Rob Filby, John Latham, Karin Kihlberg & Reuben Henry, Kate Owens, Laure Prouvost, Giles Round, 2012
- Slipped – including artists Aaron Angell, Caroline Achaintre, Lucy Conochie, Coco Crampton, Mark Essen, The Grantchester Pottery, Lawrence Leaman, Giles Round, Phil Root and Jesse Wine, 2012

== Funding ==
Wysing Arts Centre is one of Arts Council England's National Portfolio Organisations. Additional financial support for the programme comes from trusts and foundations including the Paul Hamlyn Foundation, the Henry Moore Foundation, The Leverhulme Foundation and The Ernest Cooke Trust.

== See also ==
- The Hepworth Wakefield
- Middlesbrough Institute of Modern Art
- Turner Contemporary
- Tate St Ives
- Baltic Centre for Contemporary Art
- Nottingham Contemporary
- Firstsite
- Kettle's Yard
