= David Medalla =

Filipino painter and political activist (1942–2020)

- Medalla c. 2013
- Born: David Cortez Medalla, Jr. March 23, 1942; Manila, Philippines
- Died: December 28, 2020 (aged 78); Manila, Philippines
- Notable work: Cloud Canyons; A Stitch in Time
- Movement: Kinetic art
- Partner: Adam Nankervis

David Cortez Medalla (23 March 1942 – 28 December 2020) was a Filipino international artist and political activist. His work ranged from sculpture and kinetic art to painting, installation, and performance art.

== Early life ==
David Cortez Medalla Jr. was born in Manila, Philippines to David Medalla Sr. and Juanita Angkay Cortez, both originally from Cebu. He was the second of five children, including an older half-sister. During World War II, the family evacuated Manila to the Sta. Ana Cabaret on the periphery of the city. The Medalla house was destroyed in the Battle of Manila. After liberation, Medalla Sr. built a new family home on Mabini St. in the Ermita district of Manila.

=== Education ===
==== Early education ====
Medalla attended kindergarten at Sta. Isabel College before transferring to Ermita Catholic School. He would transfer once more, this time to the Philippine Normal School, where he would graduate elementary in 1949. Afterwards, Medalla attended his first year of high school at the University of the Philippines, first on Padre Faura St. and then at the Diliman campus.

At the beginning of his second year of high school, Medalla's whereabouts were unknown for three weeks. When he eventually turned up back home, his family learned that he had snuck aboard the SS President Wilson, fallen asleep, and was discovered by its crew only after it had set sail for Hong Kong. The story was featured in the local news. Afterwards, Bessie Hackett, an American columnist with the Manila Bulletin, met with Medalla and his parents to discuss the education opportunity for him to attend the Episcopalian high school of St. Mary's in Sagada, high in the Cordillera Mountains. He attended the school for one year. In 1952, his parents sent him to Cebu to attend the high school of the University of San Carlos. He would attend the school for two days before quitting without telling his parents for several months.

==== Poetry beginnings ====
Medalla began writing poetry in 1953. He brought his poems to magazine and newspaper editors and was soon published on the front pages of The Campus Journal and The Philippine Collegian. Medalla requested that his author image be printed upside down, but the request was rejected. The next year, poet and journalist Francisco Arcellana, upon the recommendation of playwright Wilfredo Ma. Guerrero, both of whom were professors at the University of the Philippines, interviewed Medalla and wrote about him in the Saturday Morning Magazine. The article, published in 1954, was entitled "A Boy with Feelings for Words." Medalla spent this time "meandering from one newspaper office to another."

==== Further education ====
In 1954, the University of the Philippines invited Medalla to lecture. He met the president of the university, Vidal Tan, who evaluated Medalla's "mental abilities as approaching genius." Despite lacking a high school diploma, Tan allowed Medalla to enroll in the university's College of Liberal Arts. Soon after, Medalla was recommended by Tan to the George Jonas Foundation for their gifted writers program Camp Rising Sun. The international, full-scholarship program accepted Medalla. After receiving a travel grant from the Commission for Free Asia, Medalla left for New York on July 7 of the same year.

After the program finished, Medalla stayed in New York and met Mark Van Doren, then a faculty member at Columbia University. Van Doren recommended Medalla's admission as a special student to Columbia in September 1954. Medalla attended a philosophy class under John Randall, a modern drama class under Eric Bentley, a literature class under Lionel Trilling, a Greek drama class under Moses Hadas, and a poetry workshop under Léonie Adams. During his time in New York, Medalla became acquainted with New York-based Filipino artists, including poet José García Villa and painter Alfonso Ossorio. After returning to Manila, Medalla attended art lectures under Fernando Zóbel de Ayala.

== Career ==
On returning to Manila in March 1955, Medalla transformed his family home in Ermita into an art studio and salon that he called La Cave d'Angley. There he painted, taught, and hosted intellectual social gatherings. Visitors to La Cave d'Angley included the Catalan poet Jamie Gil de Biedma who was then working for Campañía General de Tabacos de Filipinas.

During the 1960s in Paris, the French philosopher Gaston Bachelard introduced Medalla's performance of Brother of Isidora at the academy of Raymond Duncan. Later, Louis Aragon would introduce another performance, and Marcel Duchamp honoured him with a "medallic" object.

His work was included in Harald Szeemann's exhibition 'Weiss auf Weiss' (1966), 'Live in Your Head: When Attitudes Become Form' (1969), and in the documenta 5 exhibition in 1972 in Kassel, Germany.

During the early 1960s Medalla moved to the United Kingdom and in 1964 co-founded the Signals London gallery, which presented international kinetic art. He was editor of the Signals news bulletin from 1964 to 1966. In 1967 he initiated the Exploding Galaxy, an international confluence of multi-media artists, significant in hippie/counterculture circles, particularly the UFO Club and Arts Lab. From 1974 to 1977 he was chairman of Artists for Democracy, an organisation dedicated to 'giving material and cultural support to liberation movements worldwide' and director of the Fitzrovia Cultural Centre in London.

Residing at the George Washington Hotel on Lexington Avenue in New York City, in 1994, he founded the Mondrian Fan Club with Adam Nankervis as vice-president.

Between 1 January 1995 and 14 February 1995 Medalla rented a space at 55 Gee Street, London, where he lived and exhibited. He exhibited seven new versions of his biokinetic constructions of the sixties (bubble machines; and a monumental sand machine). These machines were constructed from Medalla's original designs, by the English artist Dan Chadwick. The exhibition also featured large-scale prints of his New York 'Mondrian Events' with Adam Nankervis, and five large oil paintings on canvas created by Medalla in situ at 55 Gee Street. Another important feature was a monumental animated neon relief entitled 'Kinetic Mudras for Piet Mondrian' constructed by Frances Basham using argon and neon lighting after Medalla's original idea and designs. Medalla also invited artists to perform at the space.

Medalla lectured extensively, including at the Sorbonne, the École des Beaux-Arts in Paris, the Museum of Modern Art of New York, Silliman University, the University of the Philippines, the Universities of Amsterdam and Utrecht, the New York Public Library, Simon Fraser University in Vancouver, Canada, the Universities of Oxford, Cambridge, Canterbury, Warwick, and Southampton in England, the Slade School of Fine Art, and St. Martin's.

He was the founder and director of the London Biennale in 1998, a “do-it-yourself” free arts festival, which hosts work by Mai Ghoussoub, Mark McGowan, Deej Fabyc, Marko Stepanov, Adam Nankervis, James Moores, Dimitri Launder, Fritz Stolberg, Salih Kayra, Marisol Cavia, and many others.

In 2010 Medalla participated in a residency in Brazil and - in collaboration with Adam Nankervis - exhibited at the show “The Secret History of Mondrian Fanclub - Homage to Hélio Oiticica, Lygia Pape and Lygia Clark”, curated by Adriano Casanova at Baro Galeria. During this period he also produced the artwork Cosmic Pandora Micro-Box, published in 2018 in the book by James Cahill "Flying Too Close to the Sun: Myths in Art from Classical to Contemporary", Phaidon.

Medalla won awards from the New York Foundation for the Arts and the Jerome Foundation.

In 2017 Medalla's seminal participatory work "A Stitch in Time" was included in the 57th Venice Biennale curated by Christine Macel.

David Medalla is represented by his extensive archives as private collection, another vacant space. Berlin Germany 2011 to the present.

== Death ==
Medalla died in Manila on December 28, 2020. He is survived by his partner, curator Adam Nankervis, who reported that Medalla "passed away gently in his sleep."

== Style and works ==
=== Major series ===
==== Cloud Canyons ====
One of the sculptures from the Cloud Canyons series on display at the Museum of Contemporary Art Chicago. It consists of plastic tubes that emit soap bubbles, thus the sculpture constantly changes due to the many shapes that the foam forms.

In the September 1964 issue of Signals Newsbulletin, Medalla included images of his bubble machines, later called Cloud Canyons. Medalla considered it a scientific and philosophical challenge, his attempt in achieving the concept of an expanding and continuously changing sculpture. Despite little mainstream appraisal upon its initial presentation to the public, the Cloud Canyons series is considered a pioneering example of kinetic art.

The work draws inspiration from and acts as a response to the auto-destructive sculptures of Polish artist Gustav Metzger, a contributor to the Signals Newsbulletin, who called Medalla "the first master of auto-creative art." Other contemporary admirers of the bubble machines include the artist Hans Haacke as well as scientists Werner Heisenberg and J. D. Bernal. Photographs of Medalla's early bubble machines would go on to inspire Marcel Duchamp's Medallic Object sculpture.

One of the early bubble machines created, Cloud Canyons No. 3, was first exhibited in 1964 at Signals Gallery, was re-created in 2004 for the exhibition Art & The 60s: This Was Tomorrow at Tate Britain, which acquired the work in 2006. As a result, Medalla became the first Filipino to have his work as part of the Tate's permanent collection. The sculpture was later included in the Tate Britain exhibitions Migrations: Journeys into British Art in 2012 and Queer British Art 1861–1967 in 2017.

In 2016, Medalla presented a new version of the bubble machines in an exhibition at The Hepworth Wakefield for the inaugural Hepworth Prize for Sculpture. The sculpture, called Cloud Canyons No. 31, was later exhibited at the 14th Biennale of Lyon, bought by Sotheby's S2 gallery, before being sold and then permanently installed for public viewing by the Philippine bank BDO at their Corporate Center in Ortigas.

Sculptures from the Cloud Canyons series are found in the permanent collections of Tate Britain, the Queensland Art Gallery, and the Auckland Art Gallery, while papers with initial sketches and plans for a bubble machine are part of the permanent collection of the Museum of Modern Art.

==== A Stitch in Time ====
The participatory art work A Stitch in Time was first staged in 1968 and has been reimagined multiple times afterwards. The installation features a suspended stretch of cloth with bobbins hanging above. Participants are invited to stitch small objects and designs onto the cloth. Early stagings of the installation were produced at exhibitions such as documenta 5, curated by Harald Szeeman, and A Survey of the Avant-Garde in Britain, both in 1972, as well as at the poorly-received POPA at MOMA at the Modern Art Oxford in 1971.

== Awards and honors ==
In 2012, Medalla was given the Gawad Tanglaw ng Lahi award from Ateneo de Manila University, which recognizes those who have pursued Filipino identity through any channel of culture. The awarding coincided with an exhibit of Medalla's work at the Ateneo Art Gallery.

In 2016, Medalla was shortlisted for the inaugural Hepworth Prize for Sculpture alongside Phyllida Barlow, Steven Claydon, and Helen Marten.
