= Valeria Napoleone =

Italian art collector, patron, and philanthropist

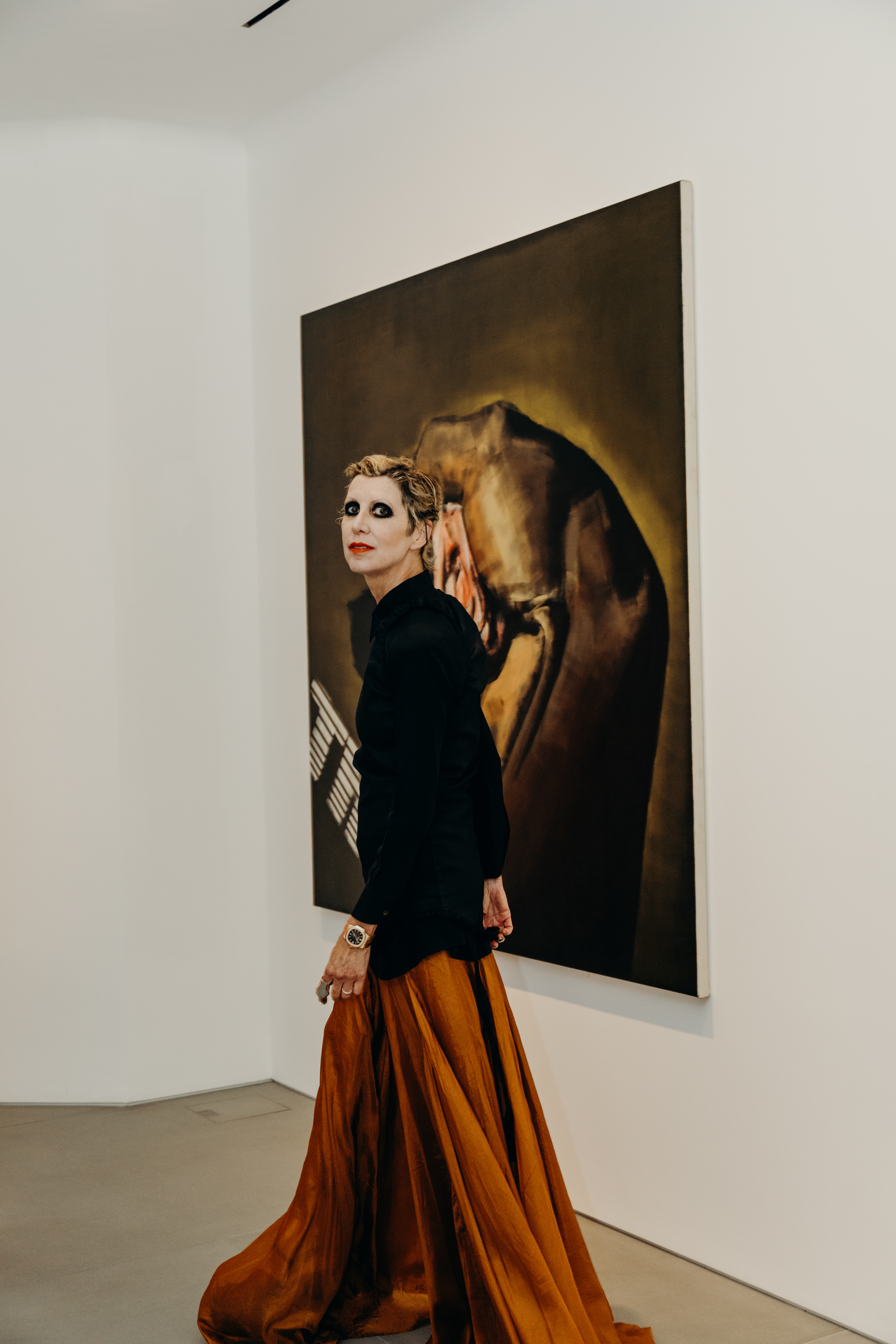
- Valeria Napoleone standing in front of an art piece from her collection
- Born: 1965 (age 60–61)
- Occupations: Art collector, patron, and philanthropist
- Known for: her contemporary art collection focuses exclusively on female artists for VNXX, VNXXCAS, and VNXX SculptureCenter
- Spouse: Gregorio G. Napoleone

Valeria Napoleone (born 1965) is an Italian art collector and patron. Valeria has been a collector for 28 years since 1997, focusing exclusively on the work of female contemporary artists working internationally.

== Early life ==
Valeria grew up in Busto Arsizio, a town near Varese in the Lombardy region of northern Italy. She is the daughter of a plastics-and-resins industrialist, who played an important role in her life as a mentor. She is the twin sister of accessories designer Stefania Pramma.

== Career ==
Napoleone has provided support to the careers of artists including Nicole Wermers, Nicole Eisenman, Phyllida Barlow, Daria Martin, Andrea Büttner, Haegue Yang, Lily van der Stokker, Lisa Yuskavage, Ghada Amer and Margherita Manzelli. Napoleone and her husband Gregorio Napoleone have also donated two works by Somaya Critchlow to the British Museum in 2021.

In the UK, she is a trustee of the Contemporary Art Society and a trustee at NYU London. She is also on the advisory board of the Association of Women in the Arts, and 2010 until 2022 she was chair of Studio Voltaire's Development Committee. Napoleone has been a supporter of UK-based institutions such as Camden Art Centre, Modern Art Oxford, South London Gallery, Nottingham Contemporary, ICA London, Milton Keynes Gallery, Glasgow International, and Chisenhale Gallery, among others.

In the U.S., Napoleone is on the board of trustees at the NYU Institute of Fine Arts, is a Vice-Chair of NYU’s President’s Global Council, is on the board of trustees at the Renaissance Society in Chicago and is an Advisory Board member of A.I.R. Gallery in NYC.

Also, in 2012, Napoleone published her first book, an art cookbook, Valeria Napoleone’s Catalogue of Exquisite Recipes, with contributions from 50 female artists, and gave the majority of the profits to Down Syndrome Education International.

== Valeria Napoleone XX ==
In 2015, Napoleone set up Valeria Napoleone XX, an umbrella platform for projects and initiatives that work towards increasing the representation of female artists in major public institutions.

Named to highlight both collaboration and the female chromosome, this platform now has four ongoing initiatives: Valeria Napoleone XX Contemporary Art Society, Valeria Napoleone XX SculptureCenter, Valeria Napoleone XX Institute of Fine Arts and Valeria Napoleone XX Artists.

== Valeria Napoleone XX Contemporary Art Society ==
Valeria Napoleone XX Contemporary Art Society (VNXXCAS) is a joint initiative of Napoleone and the Contemporary Art Society. Established in 2016, the scheme purchases and donates a significant work by a living woman artist to a UK museum each year. VNXXCAS acts as a focal point for debate on and action against gender inequality in the arts. It intends to provoke an examination of collecting practice and the wider effect beyond the acquisition of the awarded work. In 2019, Napoleone was the recipient of the Montblanc Art Patronage Award for the initiative Valeria Napoleone XX in partnership with the Contemporary Art Society.

Art donations include:

- A Pilot For A Show About Nowhere, Martine Syms (2015) donated to Leeds Art Gallery (2017)
- Susan, Aarti, Keerthana and Princess, Sunday in Brooklyn, Aliza Nisenbaum (2018) donated to Norwich Castle Museum & Art Gallery (2018)
- Untitled (Red) , 1998 and In wake of, 2014 Berni Searle donated to Manchester Art Gallery (2018/19)
- The Antepartum, 1973, Mary Kelly donated to Brighton Museum (2020)
- The Doctor, 2020, Alexandra Bircken donated to Huntarian Museum in Glasgow (2021)
- Goldenhot Buttetfly Queen, 2015, Stacy Lynn Waddell donated to the Bristol Museum & Art Gallery (2022)
- Private Quarter (Midnight-Midday), 2021 by Maryam Hoseini donated to York Art Gallery (2023)
- The disorder of desire, 2022, Frieda Toranzo Jaeger donated to Scottish National Gallery of Modern Art, Edinburgh (2024)

== Valeria Napoleone XX SculptureCenter ==
Napoleone and SculptureCenter set up VNXXSC in 2015. VNXXSC is a commitment to underwrite the production of a major commission by a female artist every 12 to 18 months at the New York-based nonprofit art institution dedicated to sculpture. It is an initiative that ensures female artists’ voices are heard and celebrated, and that they are given opportunities to create monumental new work within a solo exhibition in New York.

Art projects include:

- Anthea Hamilton: Lichen! Libido! Chastity, special commission Project for door (After Gaetano Pesce), 20 September 2015- 4 January 2016
- Carissa Rodriguez, The Maid, new video commission, Sculpture Center, New York, 28 January - 2 April 2017
- Fiona Conor, Closed for Installation, bronze pieces installation, accompanied by performative activities - perpetual window cleaning in a nearby apartment in Long Island City, 28 April - 29 July 2019
- Rindon Johnson, Law of Large Numbers: Our Bodies, a new commission: Coeval Proposition #1: Tear down so as to make flat with the Ground or The *Trans America Building DISMANTLE EVERYTHING, Sculpture Center, New York, 25 March - 2 August
- Lydia Ourahmane, Tassili, first institutional solo exhibition in New York, Sculpture Center, New York, 12 May – 1 August 2022
- Tolia Astakhishvili, between father and mother, New York, Sculpture Center, New York, 7 May- 12 August

== Valeria Napoleone XX Institute of Fine Arts NYU ==
Valeria Napoleone XX IFA is a commitment to underwrite the Great Hall Exhibition series at the NYU Institute of Fine Arts with two solo exhibitions a year focusing on the work of mid-career female artists.

Exhibitions include:

- Martha Friedman, Some Hags, IFA NYU, Institute’s James B. Duke House, New York, exhibition dates 16 October - 1 December 2016.
- Lucy Kim, Rejuvenate and Repeat, IFA NYU, Institute’s James B. Duke House, New York, 11 April- mid September 2017.
- Judith Hopf, solo show, IFA NYU, Institute’s James B. Duke House, 19 October 2017- mid January 2018.
- Jamie Isenstein, Universe of Logs, IFA NYU, Institute’s James B. Duke House, 2 May - 1 October 2018.
- Elaine Lustig Cohen, Graphic Objects: Elaine Lustig Cohen’s Sculptural Works, IFA NYU, Institute’s James B. Duke House, 19 October 2018 - 24 February 2019.
- Amy Yao, Authorized Personnel, IFA NYU, Institute’s James B. Duke House, 25 March - 15 September 2019.
- Sarah Peters, Glossolalists, IFA NYU, Institute’s James B. Duke House,15 October 2019- mid February 2020.
- Xaviera Simmons, Posture, IFA NYU, Institute’s James B. Duke House, opening 25 February 2020.
- Cauleen Smith, H-E-L-L-O: To Do All At Once IFA NYU, Institute’s James B. Duke House.
- Avital Meshi: Subverting the Algorithmic Gaze, IFA NYU, Institute’s James B. Duke House. Online opening: March 28, 2022.
- Mónica Félix, Estelio, IFA NYU, Institute’s James B. Duke House. Online opening: March 24, 2023.
- Maia Ruth Lee: Once we leave a place is it there, IFA NYU, Institute’s James B. Duke House. Opening: February 22, 2024, On View: February 23 to May 16, 2024.

== Valeria Napoleone XX Artist (VN XX A) ==
Valeria Napoleone XX Artists was launched in September 2024 as an ongoing initiative dedicated to supporting female artists closely associated with the collection, by funding the production of artworks, publications, and exhibitions.

Projects include:

- Nancy Dwyer’s solo exhibition at Kunsthalle Winterthur in Switzerland Hot Mess, September 7, 2024 - 1st, 2024.
- Margherita Manzelli’s solo exhibition, Le Signorine, at Centro Pecci in Prato, December 13th 2024- May 11, 2025.

== Valeria Napoleone Linda Nochlin Professorship and Fellowship in Modern and Contemporary Art ==
Established and endowed by Valeria Napoleone in 2024, The Valeria Napoleone Linda Nochlin Professorship and Fellowship in Modern and Contemporary Art at the Institute of Fine Arts, NYU, is an initiative aimed to create opportunities for talented scholars and individuals dedicated to advancing knowledge that makes a difference.

Catherine Quan Damman is the first incumbent of this newly established faculty position.

At the Institute, Quan Damman currently offers courses and advises graduate students on feminist and queer theoretical approaches to global modern and contemporary art.

== Personal life ==
Valeria and her husband Gregorio, co-founder of the European mid-market private equity firm Stirling Square Capital Partners, have three children, and are currently based in New York.
