= Chisenhale Gallery =

Non-profit art gallery in London

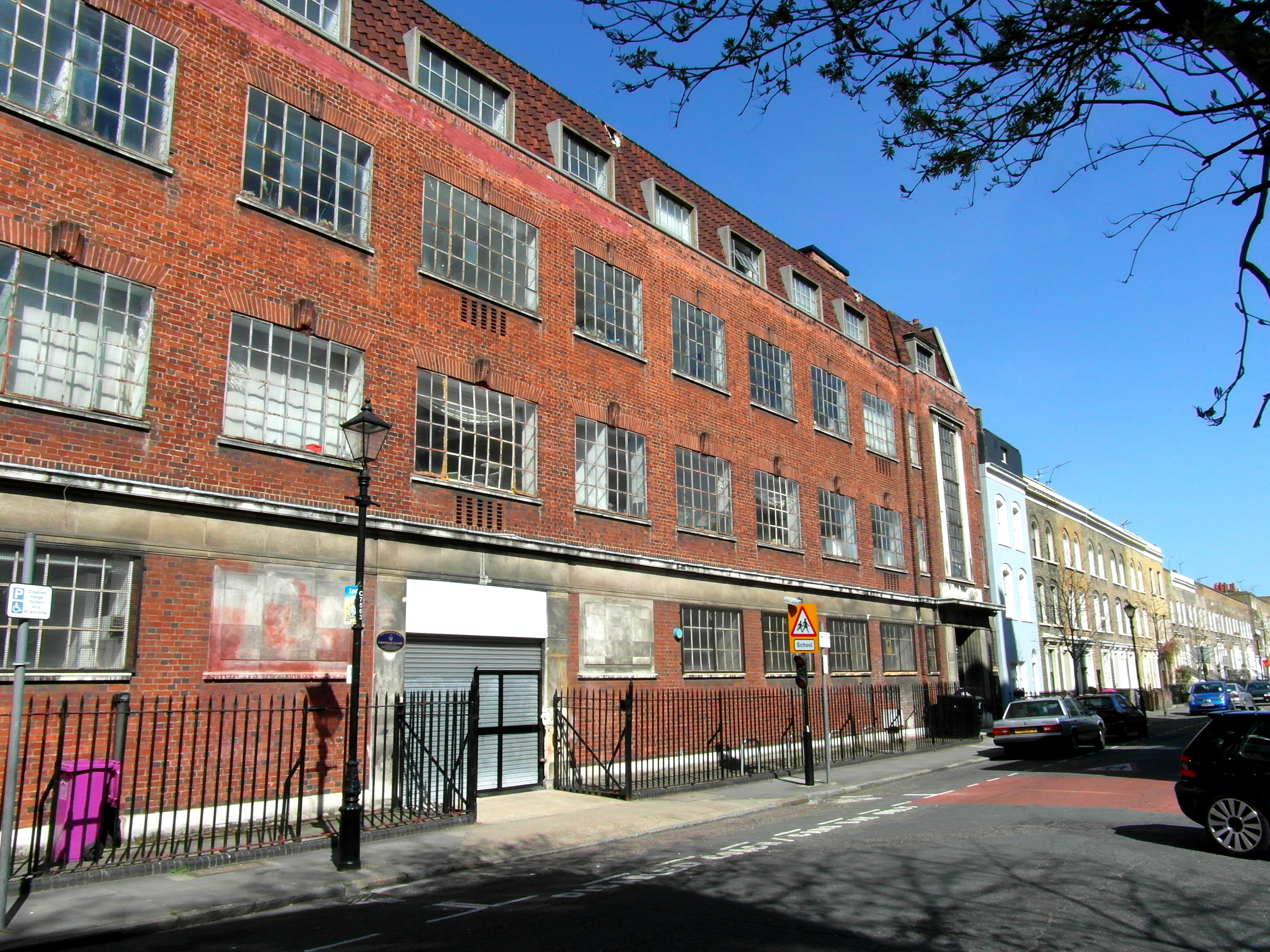
- Chisenhale Gallery, Chisenhale Arts Place Trust, London, United Kingdom

- Location within London Borough of Tower Hamlets
- Established: December 1986
- Location: London
- Coordinates: 51°31′59″N 0°02′22″W
- Type: Non profit art gallery
- Director: Edward Gillman
- Public transit access: No. 277, 425, 339 or D6 bus; Mile End Bethnal Green
- Website: www.chisenhale.org.uk

Chisenhale Gallery is a non-profit contemporary art gallery based in London's East End. The gallery occupies the ground level of a former veneer factory on Chisenhale Road, situated in the London Borough of Tower Hamlets, near Victoria Park and flanking the Hertford Union Canal. Housed in the same building are two other distinct initiatives: Chisenhale Studios and Chisenhale Dance Space, named also for the road on which they reside.

The gallery's exhibitions are free admission. The typical structure of the annual exhibitions programme is to present up to four new solo artist commissions (e.g. one each in Spring, Summer, Autumn and Winter in a given year). The selected artists, whether based in the UK or internationally, are invited to participate as the result of curatorial research taking place in advance of an 18-month to 2-year concept development and production process.

Chisenhale Gallery also has a Social Practice programme, which prioritises working with young people who experience barriers to accessing art and culture in hospitals, Child Adolescent Mental Health Services (CAMHS) and alternative provision settings.

== History ==
Chisenhale's location has been occupied by factories for industrial manufacture since at least the mid-19th century, but the building's precise origins are unclear. There are Tower Hamlets planning documents which point to operating factories on Chisenhale Road as early as the 1850s, and the site appears as ‘Pasteboard Works’ on a map surveyed in 1870. However, it is understood that the building as it exists today was built either partially or entirely at a later date.

The Chisenhale Works building which currently houses the gallery was built between 1942 and 1943, purportedly in the rubble of houses destroyed during The Blitz. The most recent iteration of the factory was operated by the furniture-maker Morris Cohen, trading as CHN Veneers (per the historic plaque erected by the gallery entrance, along the Bow Heritage Trail). CHN Veneers specialised in the production of wood veneer, expanding during the Second World War to cockpit veneers and propeller production for RAF aeroplanes including Spitfires. The letters C, H and N are visible as inlaid brickwork on the exterior façade of the building, which can be seen from the Grove Road bridge, spanning the Hertford Union canal. These letters, which might be conflated with the prominent consonants in “Chisenhale,” actually refer to the aforementioned CHN Veneers.

After the factory's closure in 1972, the building was for some years unoccupied. The adjacent building, previously used as a brewery warehouse, remains derelict today. In 1980, a group of artists, evicted from their Thames-side studio spaces by property developers, negotiated a lease of the building with Tower Hamlets Council under the name “Arts Place Trust.” They proceeded to create studios on the floors upstairs and eventually put on exhibitions in the ground floor space, initially on a for-hire basis. The gallery acknowledges this artist-led history in the statement: “Chisenhale was founded by artists.”

Between 1993 and 1994, under the directorship of Jonathan Watkins, Chisenhale Gallery established its own legal status with the Charities Commission and became a separate entity from Arts Place Trust. The organisation is a registered charity and one of Arts Council England's National Portfolio Organisations.

Before the separation from Arts Place Trust, there were three consecutive acting Gallery Managers: David Thorp (1986–1987), Emma Dexter (1987–1990) and the aforementioned Jonathan Watkins (1990–1995), who became Director of Chisenhale Gallery with the establishment of Chisenhale Gallery as an independent charity. Since, eight people have held the position of Director of Chisenhale Gallery: Judith Nesbitt (1995–1998), Sue Jones (1998–2000), Tamsin Dillon (2000–2001), John Gill (2001–2003), Simon Wallis (2004–2008), Polly Staple (2008–2019), Zoé Whitley (2019–2025) and Edward Gillman (since 2025), the gallery's current director.

== Commissions Programme ==
Since the early 1980s, Chisenhale Gallery has gained a reputation for exhibiting UK and internationally acclaimed artists early in their careers, offering many artists their first UK institutional solo show. The gallery's present-day Commissions Programme is devised based on curatorial research worldwide, the result of which early to mid-career artists are invited to develop new artwork for public exhibition. The work in question is produced over a one- to two-year incubation period, culminating in an exhibition at Chisenhale Gallery.

Among the artists who have exhibited at Chisenhale Gallery, there have been numerous Turner Prize nominees and several winners, including Rachel Whiteread (1993), Helen Marten (2016), Lubaina Himid (2017), and Lawrence Abu Hamdan (2019), among others. Most recently, of the four artists nominated for the 2023 award, nominees Ghislaine Leung and Rory Pilgrim are both Chisenhale alumni.

As both a non-profit organisation and a registered charity, Chisenhale Gallery's ongoing programme is entirely funded through trusts, foundations and individuals.

== Social Practice Programme ==
Running parallel to their commissions, Chisenhale Gallery also facilitates a long-standing Social Practice programme which aims to “incubate new ideas about the role of art in the life of a community”, as per their website.

From October 1997 to March 2003, Chisenhale Gallery's Get Art programme worked with each of the Special Educational Needs Schools in Tower Hamlets to offer children and staff access to the exhibition programme through artist-led workshops, focusing on the “role that creative practice can play on stimulating and enabling young people” and culminating with the young participants having their artwork curated into an annual show at the gallery. Artists involved in the programme included Marion Coutts and Anna Lucas. Between March and October 2004, Chisenhale Gallery collaborated with Creative Partnerships Bristol to trial the Get Art model in Bristol as Get Art Bristol.

Between 2012 and 2017 the gallery participated in the Chisenhale Gallery Create Residency, a collaboration between the gallery and Create London culminating in an 18-month artists’ residency which sought to “engage with east London’s communities and its varied social and cultural contexts." This resulted in projects with Edward Thomasson (2012–14), Yuri Pattison (2014–16), and Luke Willis Thompson (2016–17), each leading to exhibitions based on this research.

As part of their “Art Making in Unstable Contexts” programme, in 2023 Chisenhale Gallery began a collaboration with London East Alternative Provision, a local Pupil Referral Unit, to “explore the practice of teaching art in PRUs and the potential impact of involving professional artists in these classrooms for both teachers and students.”

The gallery works regularly with artists to lead workshops with students from the neighbouring Chisenhale Primary School, culminating in the production of multiple publications and other creative outcomes over the last few years. This includes “Poems from Wasted Mud” (2021), a book of poems written by the students in response to Yu Ji's Chisenhale commission, “Wasted Mud”; “In Cascades” (2024), an album of music written and recorded with artist and musician Richard Jones in response to Lotus Kang's exhibition of the same name; and “Island of Us: Conversations about Justice with Children” (2024), a resource for discussions around justice and freedom created by artist Jack Young in response to Rory Pilgrim's “pink + green”.

== Exhibitions ==
Notable exhibitions that have taken place at Chisenhale Gallery include:

- 1988 – “Essential Black Art”: a group show including Rasheed Araeen, Mona Hatoum, Keith Piper, Sonia Boyce, Zarina Bhimji, Gavin Jantjes, Eddie Chambers, Lubaina Himid, Sutapa Biswas, and Allan deSouza.
- 1988 – “Yellow Peril: New World Asians”: a group show including Taki Bluesinger, Anthony Chan, Lily Eng, Richard Fung, Jay Hirabayashi, Roy Kiyooka, Laiwan, Mary Ann Lui / Jay Samwald, Ken Lum, Marlin Oliveros, Chick Rice, Ruby Truly, Tamio Wakayama, Paul Wong, Jim Wong / Chum, and Sharyn Yuen.
- 1989 – Lubaina Himid
- 1990 – Rachel Whiteread
- 1991 – Cornelia Parker
- 1992 – Rose Finn-Kelcey
- 1993 – Richard Deacon and Bill Woodrow
- 1994 – Yoko Terauchi
- 1996 – Pipilotti Rist
- 1996 – Sam Taylor Wood
- 1997 – Gillian Wearing
- 1997 – Wolfgang Tillmans
- 1997 – Bob & Roberta Smith
- 1998 – Root: A collaborative project orbiting the release of Root, an audio album organised by Sonic Youth's Thurston Moore and featuring improvisations and new compositions from Add N to (X), Stefan Beck, Blur, David Bowie, Angela Bulloch, Cheap Glue, Rod Dickinson, Russell Haswell, Tim Head, Mogwai, Yoko Ono, Savage Pencil, Scanner, Fergal Stapleton, Stereolab, David Cunningham, Luke Vibert and Mark Webber.
- 2002 – Hew Locke
- 2007 – Grace Ndiritu
- 2007 – Rosalind Nashashibi
- 2008 – Anthea Hamilton
- 2009 – Duncan Campbell
- 2010 – Hito Steyerl
- 2010 – Linder
- 2011 – James Richards
- 2012 – Amalia Pica
- 2012 – Lynette Yiadom-Boakye
- 2012 – Ed Atkins
- 2013 – Helen Marten
- 2014 – Camille Henrot
- 2015 – Ahmet Ögüt
- 2016 – Park McArthur
- 2016 – Maria Eichhorn
- 2018 – Lawrence Abu Hamdan
- 2021 – Abbas Akhavan
- 2022 – Rindon Johnson
- 2023 – Alia Farid
- 2024 – Simnikiwe Buhlungu

== Networks ==
=== Common Practice ===
Chisenhale Gallery is a founding member of the small-gallery advocacy group Common Practice, formed in 2009. Today, they are joined by Afterall, Gasworks, Iniva (Institute of International Visual Arts), LUX, Matt's Gallery, The Showroom, and Studio Voltaire.

=== Plus Tate ===
Plus Tate was launched in 2010 with an aim to share art collections and expertise with other UK galleries. The Chisenhale Gallery is one of 34 partners.

=== How to work together ===
How to work together was a partnership programme of contemporary art commissions and research based projects devised by Chisenhale Gallery, The Showroom and Studio Voltaire between 2013 and 2016. The project is supported by Arts Council England's Catalyst Arts grant scheme, Bloomberg, Cockayne Grants for the Arts and the Jerwood Charitable Foundation.

=== 2.8 Million Minds ===
2.8 Million Minds began as a collaboration between Chisenhale Gallery, Bernie Grant Arts Centre and artist James Leadbitter, also known as ‘the vacuum cleaner’. The project is part of the Mayor of London's Culture and Creative Industries Unit, funded by Baring Foundation and Thrive LDN as part of Thriving Through Culture. Conceived as a pilot project commissioned by the Mayor of London Sadiq Khan, 2.8 Million Minds acknowledged London's population of 2,879,900 children and young people aged 0-25, posing the question: "how can young people use art and culture to create change in their mental health, and how mental health services are funded and delivered?"

Between November 2021 and June 2022, more than 120 young people contributed to A Manifesto for 2.8 Million Minds, a youth-led, artist-centred, and Disability Justice-informed approach to how young Londoners want to use art to begin to radically reimagine mental health support, justice and pride. The manifesto received high commendation from the Culture Health & Wellbeing Alliance's Collective Power Award 2022.

Launched at the Houses of Parliament in June 2022, the manifesto brings together the feelings, artistic processes, and actionable ideas of young people across Haringey and Tower Hamlets with artists Becky Warnock, Simon Tomlinson, Tyreis Holder, and Yomi Sode, challenging how and who makes the decisions in the lives of young people's mental health. The document includes how-to guides, resources and critical reflections.

== Chisenhale Books ==
In 2021, Chisenhale Gallery launched Chisenhale Books, a strand of the organisation's output dedicated to the production of an artist's first major publication to accompany their exhibition. The inaugural release, say cheeeeese, was published by Hurtwood Press in Summer 2022 alongside Rachel Jones’ Chisenhale commission of the same name. It included contributions from award-winning poet Anaïs Duplan and MacArthur Fellow Claudia Rankine. The second title in the series, In a Dream You Climb the Stairs, accompanied Nikita Gale’s exhibition, and launched at Frieze London on 15 October 2022. Contributors to Gale's first book are Pulitzer Prize-winner Hilton Als, conceptual artist Barbara Kruger and academic Bénédicte Boisseron.

A third title, In Cascades, was released in July 2023 to mark the conclusion of Lotus Laurie Kang's critically acclaimed first exhibition in Europe, featuring poet CAConrad. Later that year, Chisenhale Books co-published Slumber Party with Mousse Publishing to coincide with Benoît Piéron's exhibition of the same name in November 2023, featuring contributions from Clay AD, Olivia Aherne, Paul Maheke, Roxanne Maillet, Benoît Piéron and Zoé Whitley.

Most recently, Chisenhale Books released a second publication in partnership with Mousse Publishing titled The Process, written by artist Joshua Leon alongside his Chisenhale show, The Missing O and E. Released in May 2024, the text includes a piece of original writing by Leon, an essay by the exhibition's curators Olivia Aherne and Amy Jones, and an afterword by Zoé Whitley.
