= Nancy Balfour =

American-born English arts administrator (1911–1997)

Nancy Balfour OBE
- Born: 17 May 1911; San Francisco, California, United States
- Died: 29 August 1997 (aged 86); Westminster, London, England
- Citizenship: United Kingdom
- Education: Wycombe Abbey School; Lady Margaret Hall, Oxford
- Occupations: Arts administrator; Journalist
- Employers: The Economist (1948–1972); Contemporary Art Society (1967–1997)

Nancy Balfour OBE (17 May 1911 – 29 August 1997) was an American-born English arts administrator for the Contemporary Art Society (CAS) and journalist for The Economist. She worked for The Economist from 1948 to 1972 as editor of its American Survey and attempted to make the piece interesting to both American and British readers and broaden American affairs and opinion.

Balfour served as chairman and later president of the CAS in the 1970s, helping to stabilise the organisation's finances, began a programme to advice corporations on producing contemporary and modern collections and pioneered cultural travel for its members. She also served as vice-chair of the Crafts Council and was a founder of the British-American Arts Association. Following her death, a loan for students at the Slade School of Fine Art was set up in her name.

== Early life ==
Balfour was born close to San Francisco, California, on 17 May 1911, to Alexander Balfour and his wife, Ruth Macfarland. She was half-American, and was raised in England. Balfour was schooled at the Wycombe Abbey School, and read economics, politics and philosophy as an undergraduate student at Lady Margaret Hall, Oxford in the 1930s. She began to display a fascination of art while at university and collected small works by Barbara Hepworth and Henry Moore. During the Second World War, she worked under Arnold J. Toynbee at the Foreign Office's Research Department, where she read and summarised foreign press articles. Balfour subsequently worked for the BBC North American Service from 1945 to 1948.

== Career ==
In 1948, she joined the staff of The Economist in London as editor of its American Survey in place of Margaret Cruikshank, who served as her deputy. Their goal was to convert American Survey into a section of interest to both American and British readers. which eventually helped to prepare for the raising of the magazine's circulation in the United States between the 1970s and the 1980s. Under Balfour, the magazine attempted to feature a broader range of affairs and opinion in the United States by employing the detachment of an editorial base in London to avoid bias from New York and Washington, D.C. While most of the magazine favoured the position of the Government of the United States during the Vietnam War, her section was more critical, reflecting her own democratic politics.

In contrast to fellow members of staff, Balfour keenly supported the decision to construct the current Modernist Economist building in St James's Street, and was instrumental in obtaining the works to decorate the building. She helped to begin the custom of staging art exhibitions in the foyer and encouraged sculpture students from the Royal Academy Schools to work in its courtyard midway through each year. Balfour joined the Artist Placement Group as a trustee and the committee of the Contemporary Art Society (CAS) in 1967. She formed The Nancy Balfour Charitable Trust in September 1969, to provide support to working artists. Balfour became honorary treasurer of the CAS in 1971.

She retired from The Economist in 1972 at just over the age of 60 to focus full-time as an arts volunteer, and was replaced by John Midgley. Balfour became a visiting fellow of the Kennedy Center for Government at Harvard University in 1973 and left the position a year later. In 1976, she was appointed chairman of the CAS. Balfour said her objective at the CAS was to "blow it up one way or another". During her time at the CAS, she strove for the organisation to keep its position as a society of interested art collectors and placed attention on providing companies with advice on art collections to give the society funding to achieve the goal of "enriching public collections with gifts of good and challenging art". Balfour initiated a programme of disinterested advice to corporations producing contemporary and modern collections, and pioneered cultural travel for its members.

In 1980, she was a founder member of the British-American Arts Association. Balfour stepped down as chairman of the CAS in 1982 and the society made her president in 1986. She was a trustee on the board of the Public Art Development Fund from 1983 to 1991, and was vice-chair of the Crafts Council between 1983 and 1985. Balfour also chaired the arts services grant committee SPACE and the crafts panel of Southern Arts.

== Awards and recognition ==
In the 1965 Birthday Honours, Balfour was appointed Officer of the Order of the British Empire (OBE).

== Personal life ==
When she was at The Economist, she was nicknamed Colonel Balfour "for her uncompromising and sometimes inflexible approach." Balfour was described as "a small, dumpy woman with a strongly upper-class English accent", who dressed "elegantly in couture clothes tailored to her diminutive but full-busted figure and until the end of her life kept her neatly coiffed hair ash blonde." She was called "Spirited, cantankerous" with "ferocious intelligence and frank, sometimes even hectoring conversation, were a combination that could be daunting".

Unmarried, Balfour died at her home in Westminster on 29 August 1997.

== Legacy ==
Following her death, a collection of art works owned by Balfour was donated to the CAS by the Nancy Balfour Trust. The Nancy Balfour Trust Scholarship loan was set up in her name to be available for an undergraduate or postgraduate student at the Slade School of Fine Art for the duration of their course which they were required to pay at the beginning of each year. Three years after her death, The Nancy Balfour Charitable Trust was closed. In 2019, her niece donated three sculptures owned by Balfour to The Hepworth Wakefield via Arts Council England.
