= Bournville Centre for Visual Arts =

Former art school in Birmingham, England

Birmingham Institute for Art and Design, Bournville
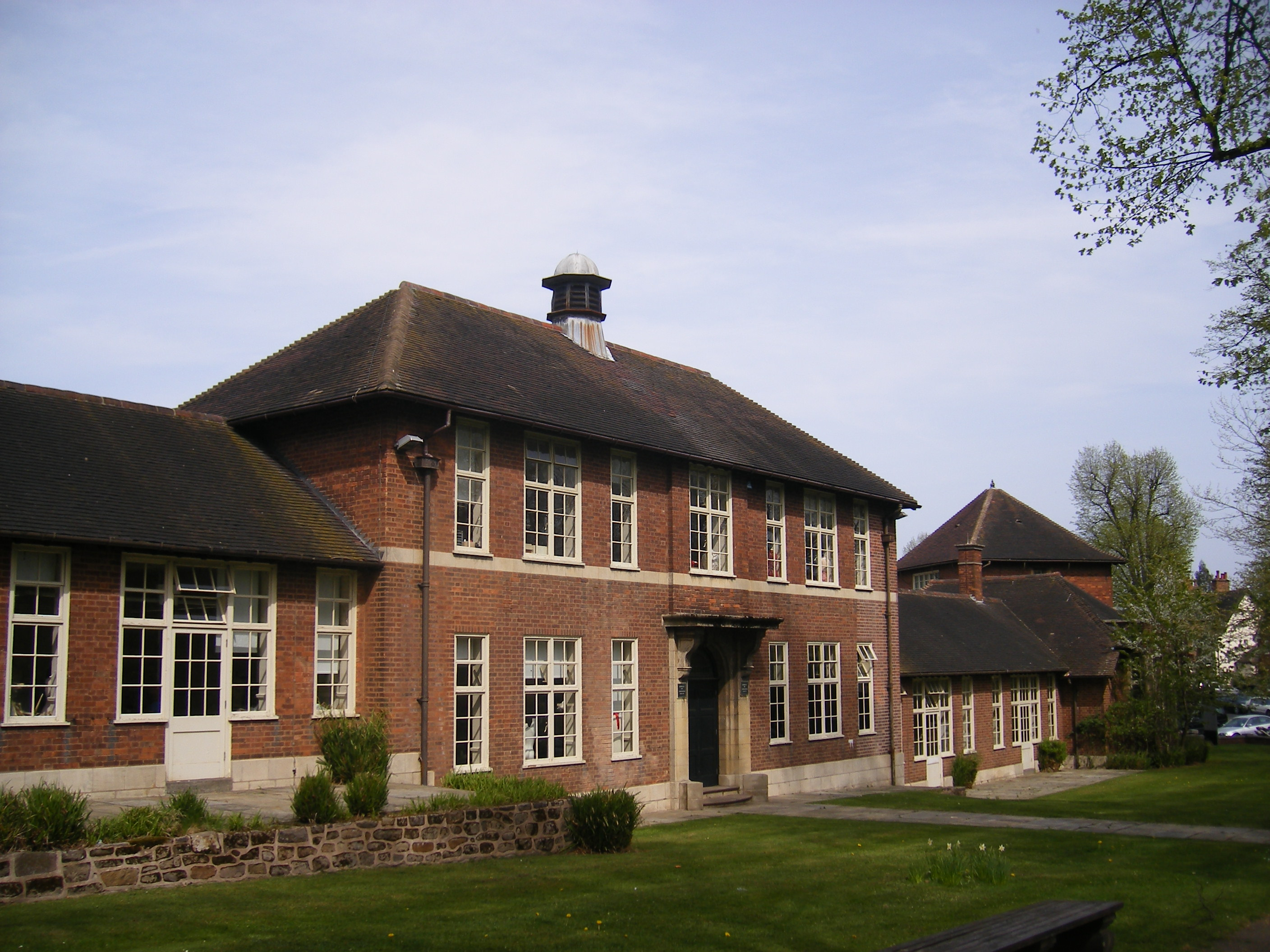
- School of Art and Design Building, Bournville
- Former names: Bournville School of Art; Bournville College of Art; Bournville Centre for Visual Arts
- Type: Art school
- Affiliations: Birmingham City University; Birmingham Institute of Art and Design; International Project Space
- Location: Birmingham, West Midlands, England, United Kingdom; 52.4304°N 1.9369°W
- Campus: Urban
- Website: bcu.ac.uk/biad
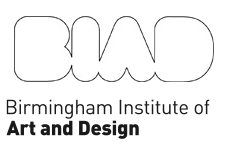

The School of Art, Bournville (formerly Bournville College of Art and Bournville Centre for Visual Arts but better known as Bournville School of Art) was an art school in Birmingham, England. It was located at Ruskin Hall on Linden Road in the area of Bournville. It became part of Birmingham Institute of Art and Design (BIAD) at Birmingham City University when it merged with the university in 1988 when the latter was still Birmingham Polytechnic.

The school was refurbished for £6 million in 2002 and reopened on 21 October 2002, precisely 100 years after the foundation stone for Ruskin Hall was laid. It was home to the International Project Space, and is the site of Birmingham's annual Creative Partnerships exhibition, a showcase of contemporary and visual art produced by local school students. The centre was the subject of controversy in 2008 regarding an exhibition honouring the work of author J. G. Ballard, which included sexually explicit images (described as "heavily pornographic" by a local councillor) and the wreckage of a car.

Alumni of the school include photographer Richard Billingham, artists Roger Hiorns and Donald Rodney, illustrator John Shelley, video artist Marty St. James, and actress Marjorie Yates.

From 2013, the School's courses moved to Birmingham City University's new Parkside Building in Birmingham city centre, with the Bournville site becoming home to the University's International College.

== International Project Space ==
The International Project Space (sometimes referred to as IPS:Bournville) was an art gallery located at the Bournville Centre for Visual Arts, which was a campus of Birmingham City University's Birmingham Institute of Art and Design in the Bournville district of Birmingham, England until 2013. The site is now home to the University's International College.

The gallery opened in 2002 and hosts a programme of exhibitions by local and international contemporary artists along with residencies and conferences. Former curators: Andrew Hunt, Matthew Williams, Andrew Bonacina.

Artists whose work has featured at the IPS include Hans Aarsman, Bill Brandt and Aleksandra Mir. David Osbaldeston, Steve Claydon, Ian Kiaer & Sara Mackillop, FREEE, Laure Provost.

== See also ==
- Arts in Birmingham
- Education in Birmingham
