= Cerith Wyn Evans =

Welsh artist (born 1958)

- Born: Cerith Wyn Evans; 1958 (age 67–68); Llanelli, Carmarthenshire, Wales
- Education: Dyfed College of Art; Saint Martin's School of Art
- Known for: Conceptual artist, sculptor and film-maker
- Patrons: Conceptual art

Cerith Wyn Evans (born 1958 in Llanelli) is a Welsh conceptual artist, sculptor and film-maker. In 2018 he won the £30,000 Hepworth Prize for Sculpture.

== Early life and education ==
The son of Sulwyn and Myfanwy Evans, Evans was born in Llanelli, Carmarthenshire. He was educated at Ysgol Gymraeg Dewi Sant, Llanelli and at Llanelli Boys Grammar School. His father was a noted photographer and painter. Evans is a fluent Welsh speaker.

Evans completed a foundation course at Dyfed College of Art (1976–77), and later studied at Saint Martin's School of Art (1977–80), while working as an invigilator at the Tate, and the Royal College of Art (1981–84). Among his teachers at Saint Martin's was conceptual artist John Stezaker. Evans then served as an assistant to Derek Jarman, with whom he worked on The Angelic Conversation (1985), Caravaggio (1986), and The Last of England (1987). His early experimental film work in the 1980s often concentrated on dancers including collaborations with Michael Clark. In 1988, his short film Degrees of Blindness, starring Tilda Swinton, was shown at the Chicago International Film Festival. He also collaborated on noted pop videos with bands including The Smiths and Throbbing Gristle. Evans was squatting in London.

== Work ==
Although Evans moved to sculpture and installation in the early 1990s, the influence of film remained strong on his work. Most of the artist's work stems from his strong interest in language and communication, often using found or remembered texts from film, philosophy or literature combined with a clean aesthetic. Writing in Frieze, in 1999, Jennifer Higgie said: "Evans' use of repetition and elliptical meaning indicates endless possible readings: his choice of a quote replete with both classical and personal implications placed at the junction of earth and sea nods to Platonic ideas about renewal, while the decaying beach reflects a more negative image of repetition as a kind of dead end, a form of stasis."

Evans' firework pieces, for example, are wooden structures that spell out open-ended texts that burn over a designated period of time. His transparent, crystal chandelier sculptures, such as the multi-coloured Italian Murano glass chandelier‚ Astrophotography... (2006) are programmed to evoke an otherworldly language from sections of text translated into the flashing light signals of Morse Code. The texts rendered in code are sometimes visible simultaneously on adjacent computer screens embedded in the gallery walls and represent a personal canon of literature and include letters, poems, philosophical extracts and short stories by writers ranging from Theodor Adorno, William Blake and Judith Butler to Brion Gysin, James Merrill and the Marquis de Sade. For the Venice Biennale in 2003, he created Cleave 03, an installation which consisted of a World War II searchlight sending a seven-mile beam of light into the night sky over the Giudecca flashing intermittently in a morse code version of Ellis Wynne's 1703 Welsh text Gweledigaethau y Bardd Cwsc. In his earlier Cleave installations, he refracted the light signals of Morse code off a rotating mirror ball to create dazzling and intense sensory environments. The artist is also interested in the way that soundtracks form a parallel 'text' for a film or photograph and in the slippage created when these sounds are dislodged, changed or removed.

From 1984, in an homage to artist and writer Brion Gysin, Evans reconstructed Gysin's Dreamachines – cylindrical light-shades spinning on wooden platforms at 75 rpm, invented as a way to tap into dream states and the unconscious of the 'viewer'. When looked at with closed eyes, the rotating, flickering light is meant to provoke an altered state of consciousness. For S=U=P=E=R=S=T=R=U=C=T=U=R=E ('Trace me back to some loud, shallow, chill, underlying motives overspill') (2010), Evans created a wall of glowing columns, each one made from thousands of tubular lights that warm the exhibition space unbearably.

From 1989 to 1995 he taught at the Architectural Association, London.

=== Collaborations ===
In 2007, Evans contributed to Visionaire 53: Sound, a compilation by Visionaire magazine featuring contributions from over 100 artists including Michael Stipe, Malcolm McLaren, Yoko Ono, and Christian Marclay, among others. In 2009 he collaborated with fellow artist-musician Florian Hecker and Thyssen-Bornemisza Art Contemporary on the opera project No night No day at the 53rd Venice Biennale. A collaboration with English band Throbbing Gristle titled A=P=P=A=R=I=T=I=O=N was displayed at Tramway, Glasgow in 2009; with the title taken from a poem by the radical 19th-century French writer Stéphane Mallarmé, Throbbing Gristle contributed a multi-channel soundtrack that was played through sixteen hanging Audio Spotlight sound panels that Evans had incorporated into his chandelier sculpture. In 2011, Evans was featured in Juergen Teller's ad campaign for fashion label Marc Jacobs.

=== Commissions ===
Along with other artists, including Liam Gillick and Thomas Demand, Evans was commissioned in 2007 to contribute a work of art to the newly opened Lufthansa Aviation Center in Frankfurt. In 2010, he created five Light Columns for the illuminated entry portal of the K&L Gates Center in Pittsburgh, complemented by the neon wall sculpture Mobius Strip at the entry reception desk. Commissioned by the Great North Run Cultural Programme in 2011, he unveiled Permit yourself..., a large-scale kinetic sculpture installation composed of double-sided glass panel mirrors, with an excerpt of text cut out of each mobile panel. That same year, the artist was commissioned to design a large-scale picture (176 m2) for the season 2011/2012 of the Vienna State Opera as part of the exhibition series "Safety Curtain", conceived by museum in progress. In 2017, Evans was selected to create the Tate Britain Commission. Displayed in the Duveen Galleries, "Forms in Space…by Light (in Time)" was made from almost 2 km of neon lighting suspended from the ceiling.

== Exhibitions ==
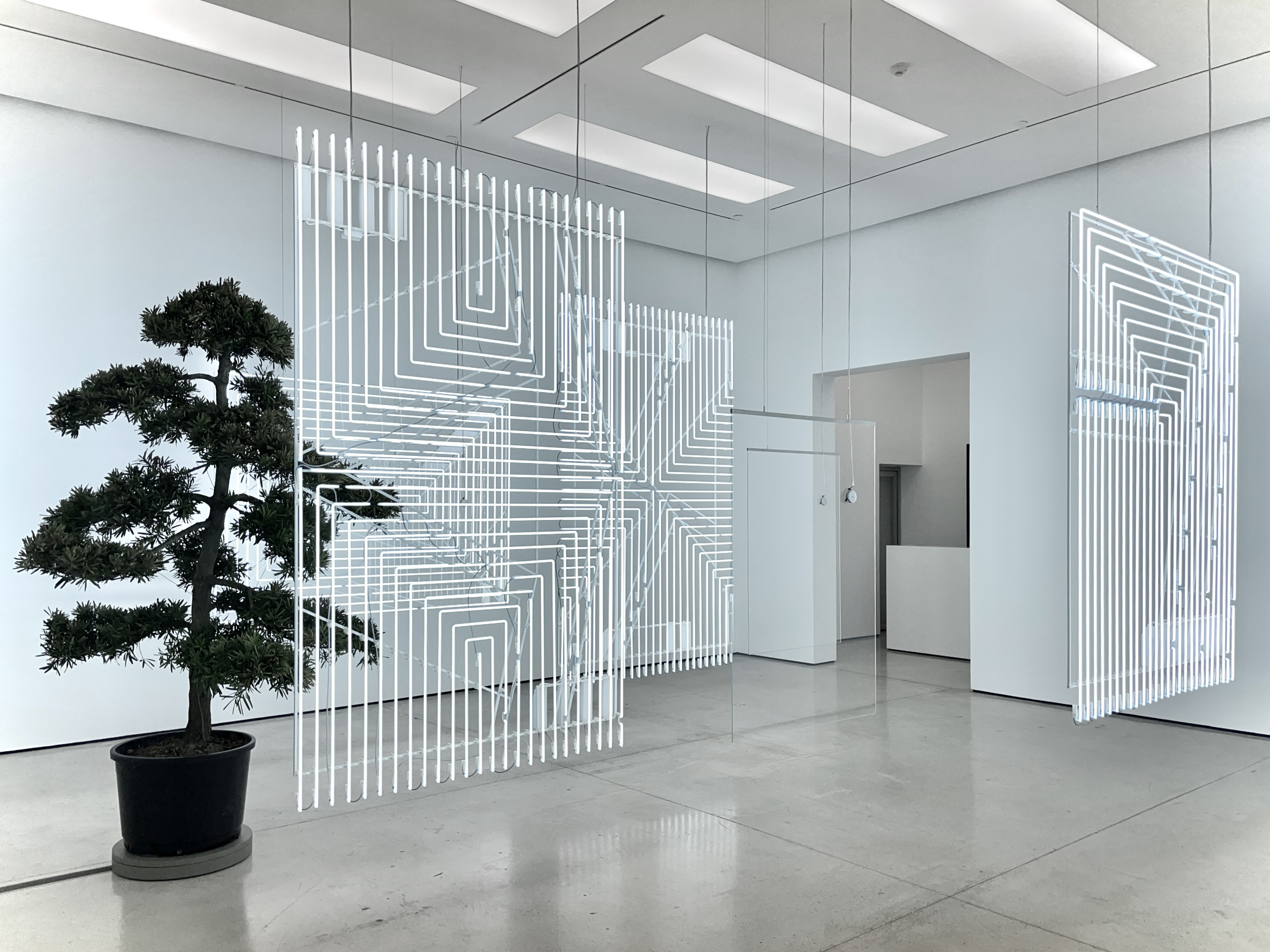
….)( of, a clearing at White Cube Hong Kong, 2022

In 2003, Evans represented Wales in the first Wales Pavilion at the Venice Biennale. In 2004, on the occasion of his two-part exhibition at the Museum of Fine Arts, Boston and the List Visual Arts Center at the Massachusetts Institute of Technology in Cambridge, Massachusetts, he combined work by himself and his father, a gifted amateur photographer, with objects from the Museum of Fine Arts and M.I.T. collections. Recent solo exhibitions include the Serpentine Galleries (2014), De La Warr Pavilion (2012), Kunsthall Bergen (2011), Tramway, Glasgow (2009), Inverleith House, Edinburgh (2009), MUSAC, Leon (2008), Musée d'Art Moderne de la Ville de Paris (2006), Kunsthaus Graz (2005), and Camden Arts Centre (2004). He has also participated in the Moscow Biennial (2011), Aichi Triennale (2010), the Yokohama Triennale (2008), the Istanbul Biennial (2005), documenta 11 (2002), and the Venice Biennale (1995, 2003).

In March 2018, Evans was shortlisted for the Hepworth Prize for Sculpture, alongside Michael Dean, Mona Hatoum, Phillip Lai, and Magali Reus. The work of the shortlisted artists was displayed at the Hepworth Wakefield gallery from the end of October of that year, and on 15 November it was announced that Evans was the winner of the £30,000 prize.

From June to October 2025, …in light of the visible is presented at the Museum of Contemporary Art Australia in Sydney.

Evans is represented by White Cube, London, Marian Goodman, New York and Paris, Galerie Buchholz, Cologne, Galerie Neu, Berlin, Lorcan O'Neil, Rome, and Fortes D'Aloia & Gabriel, São Paulo.

== Recognition ==
- 2006: Internationaler Kunstpreis Kulturstiftung Stadtsparkasse München
- 2018: Hepworth Prize for Sculpture

== Literature ==
- Bill Arning: Thoughts unsaid, now forgotten…, Boston: MIT List Visual Art Center, 2004
- Jennifer Higgie: Cerith Wyn Evans, London: Camden Arts Centre 2004
- Moritz Küng (ed.): Cerith Wyn Evans, ... – delay, Buchhandlung König, Cologne 2009 ISBN 9783865607225
- Hans Ulrich Obrist in conversation with Cerith Wyn Evans. König, Cologne 2010. The Conversation Series 24. ISBN 9783865606334.
- Octavio Zaya (ed.):...visibleinvisible; with MUSAC, Leon; text: Spanish/English by Octavio Zaya and Daniel Birnbaum, Verlag Hatje Cantz, Westfildern 2008 ISBN 978-3-7757-2131-8
- Hans Ulrich Obrist, Nancy Spector, Daniel Birnbaum, Cerith Wyn Evans, Phaidon Press, London, 2023. ISBN 9781838661939
