= Terauchi =

Terauchi (written: 寺内) is a Japanese surname. Notable people with the surname include:

- Ken Terauchi (寺内 健, born 1980), Japanese diver
- Hisaichi Terauchi (寺内 寿一, 1879–1946), Imperial Japanese army marshal and commander of the Southern Expeditionary Army Group
- Terauchi Masatake (寺内 正毅, 1852–1919), Japanese military officer, politician and Prime Minister of Japan
- Takayuki Terauchi (寺内 崇幸, born 1983), Japanese baseball player
- Takeshi Terauchi (寺内 タケシ, born 1939), Japanese rock guitarist
- Yoko Terauchi (born 1954), Japanese artist
- Yorie Terauchi (寺内 よりえ, born 1953), Japanese actress and voice actress
