= Hepworth Prize for Sculpture =

The Hepworth Prize for Sculpture is a biennial prize for sculpture named for Barbara Hepworth and awarded by The Hepworth Wakefield. The prize seeks to recognise "a British or UK-based artist of any age, at any stage in their career, who has made a significant contribution to the development of contemporary sculpture".

== History ==
The Hepworth Prize for Sculpture was launched by The Hepworth Wakefield in October 2015, as part of the celebrations marking the gallery's 5th anniversary. It has a prize value of £30,000 and will be awarded every two years.

== Inaugural prize, 2016 ==
A five-strong judging panel chaired by the gallery's director, Simon Wallis, selected the sculptors shortlisted for the inaugural prize. The latter were named on 21 March 2016 as Phyllida Barlow, Steven Claydon, Helen Marten and David Medalla. BBC Radio 4's Front Row noted, "Their work featuring household junk, hammocks, foam bubbles, magnetised pennies and paintings suggests sculpture is a broad church these days", and writing in the Financial Times, Harriet Fitch Little called it "a shortlist of uncommon breadth".

The selected works went on public display in October 2016, and the artists discussed contemporary sculpture the following day on Radio 4.

On 17 November 2016, following approximately two hours of deliberations by the panel, the winner of the inaugural prize was announced to be Helen Marten. Accepting the prize money she said she would be sharing it with the others on the shortlist, saying "In the light of the world's ever lengthening political shadow, the art world has a responsibility to show how democracy should work. I was flattered to be on the shortlist and even more so if my fellow nominees would share the Prize with me." She added, "Here's to a furthering of communality and a platform for everyone".

== 2018 award ==
In March 2018, the shortlist for the 2018 award was announced. It comprised Michael Dean, Mona Hatoum, Phillip Lai, Magali Reus and Cerith Wyn Evans. Their work was displayed at the Hepworth Wakefield gallery from the end of October of that year.

Wyn Evans was announced as the winner on 15 November 2018.

== See also ==
- List of European art awards
