= Mona Hatoum =

British-Palestinian multimedia and installation artist

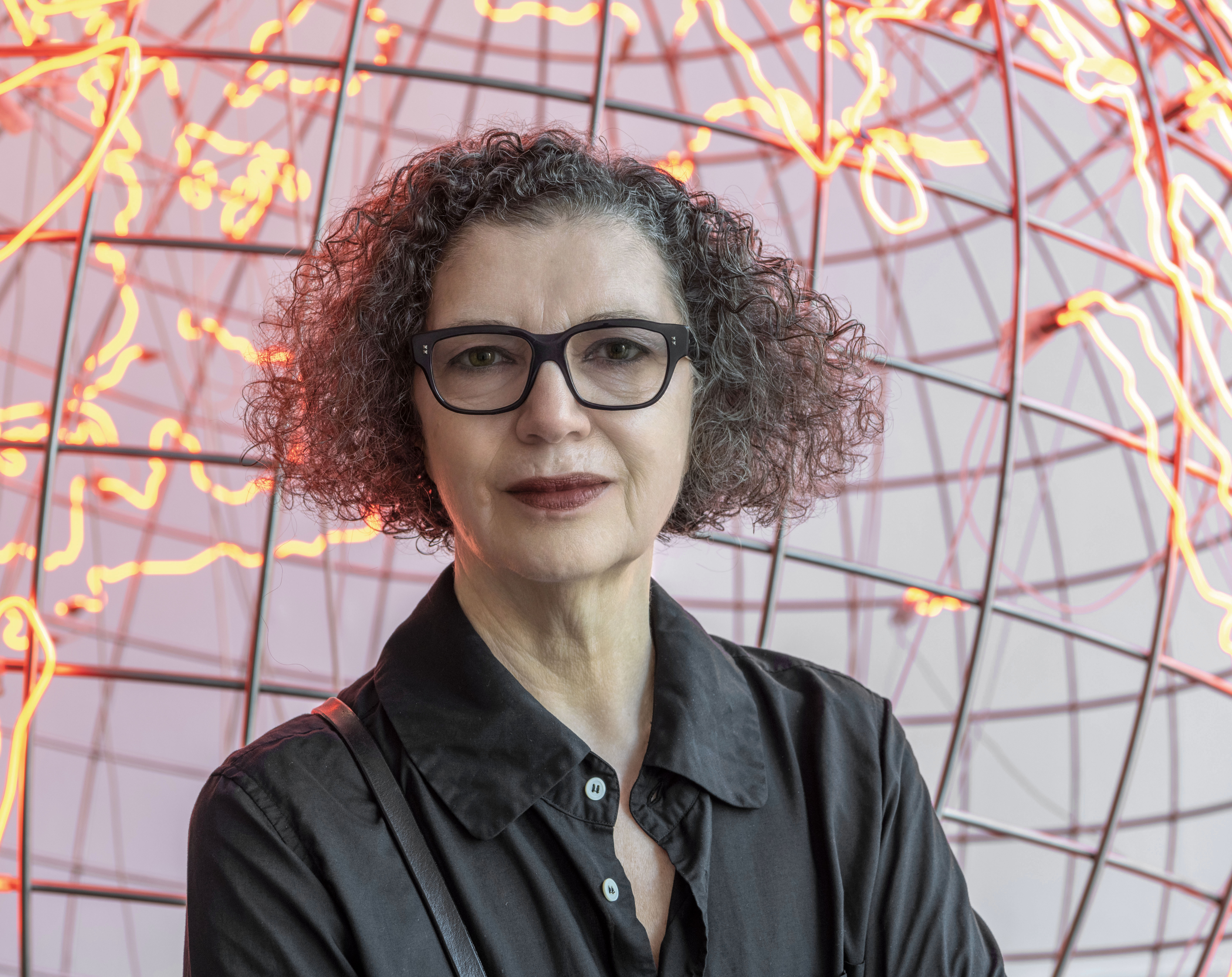
- Mona Hatoum, 2021, during the closing of her exhibition at IVAM
- Born: 1952 (age 73–74); Beirut, Lebanon
- Education: Beirut University College
- Awards: Rolf Schock Prizes in Visual Arts (2008); Joan Miró Prize (2011); Praemium Imperiale (2019); Julio González Prize (2020)
- Hatoum's voice recorded September 2021 at IVAM.

Mona Hatoum (Arabic: منى حاطوم; born 1952) is a British-Palestinian multimedia and installation artist who lives in London.

== Biography ==
Mona Hatoum was born in 1952 in Beirut, Lebanon, to Palestinian parents from Haifa. Although born in Lebanon, Hatoum was ineligible for a Lebanese identity card and does not identify as Lebanese. As she grew up, her family did not support her desire to pursue art. She continued to draw throughout her childhood, though, illustrating her work from poetry and science classes.

Hatoum studied graphic design at Beirut University College in Lebanon for two years and then began working at an advertising agency. Hatoum was displeased with the advertising work she produced. During a visit to London in 1975, the Lebanese Civil War broke out and Hatoum was forced into exile.

She stayed in London, training at both the Byam Shaw School of Art and the Slade School of Fine Art (University College, London) between the years 1975 and 1981. In the years since, "she has traveled extensively and developed a dynamic art practice that explores human struggles related to political conflict, global inequity, and being an outsider."

== Artwork and themes ==
Hatoum explores a variety of different subject matter via different theoretical frameworks. Her work can be interpreted as a description of the body, as a commentary on politics, and on gender and difference as she explores the dangers and confines of the domestic world. Her work can also be interpreted through the concept of space as her sculpture and installation work depend on the viewer to inhabit the surrounding space to complete the effect. There are always multiple readings to her work. The physical responses that Hatoum desired to provoke psychological and emotional responses ensures unique and individual reactions from different viewers.

=== Early work ===
Hatoum's early work consisted largely of performance pieces that used a direct physical confrontation with an audience to make a political point. She used this technique as a means of making a direct statement using her own body; the performances often referenced her background and the political situation in Palestine. In her work, she addressed the vulnerability of the individual in relation to the violence inherent in institutional power structures. Her primary point of reference was the human body, sometimes using her own body.

One such example was in her 1985 work, Roadworks, in which Hatoum walked barefoot through the streets of Brixton, with black boots tied behind her ankles, a statement on the surveillance and policing of the predominantly-Afro-Caribbean population after the 1981 Brixton riot/uprising and the 1985 Brixton riot/uprising. About this work, she writes: ‘I found myself in this rare situation of creating work which although personal/autobiographical, had an immediate relevance to the community of people it was addressing. I also found that I was working ‘for’ the people in the streets of Brixton rather than ‘against’ the indifferent, often hostile audience I usually encounter.’ Roadworks was curated as part of the 2023 Women in Revolt Exhibition at Tate Modern.

=== Measures of Distance ===
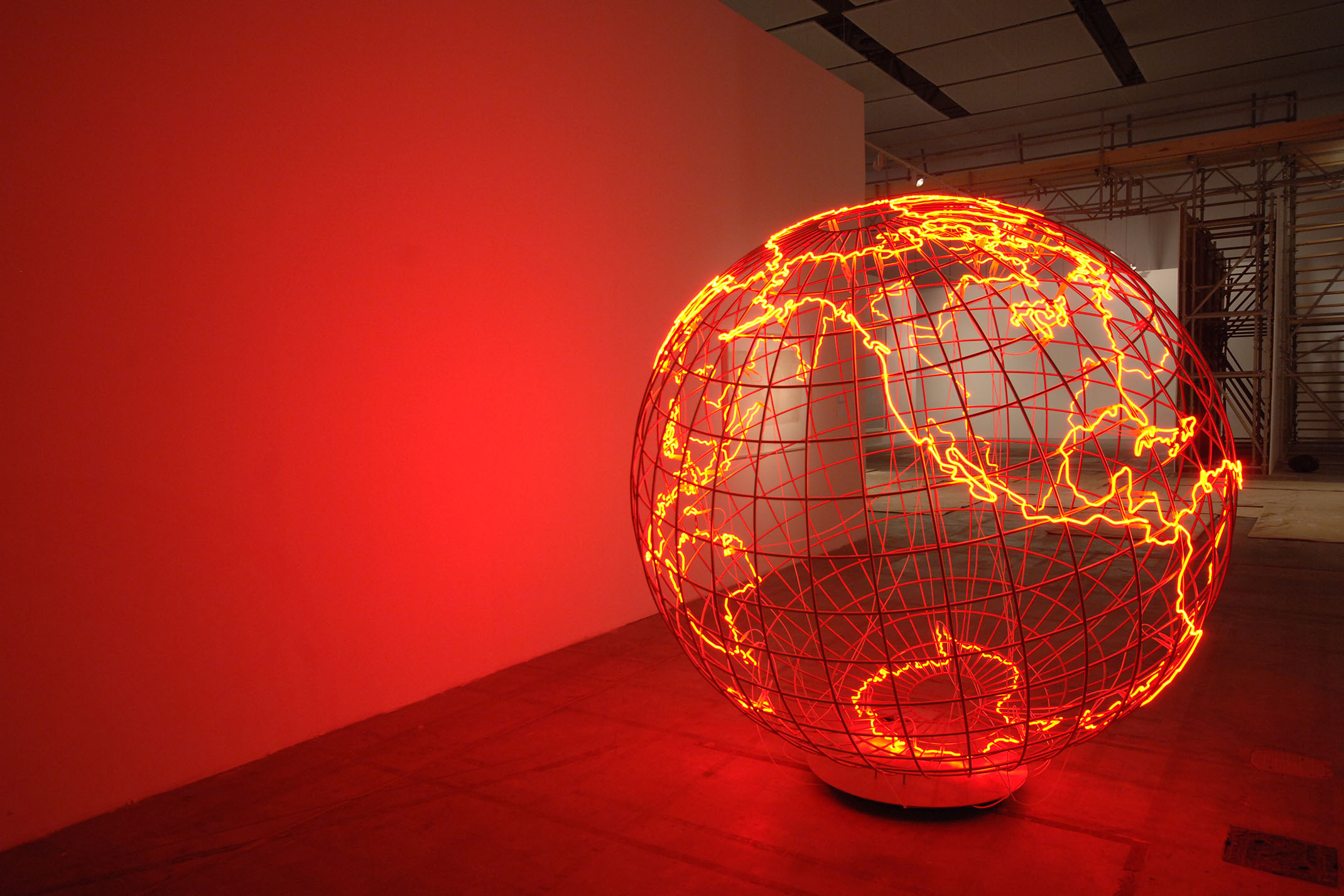
Hot Spot (2006) by Hatoum

Created in 1988 as a result of a residency at Western Front in Vancouver, Measures of Distance illustrates Hatoum's early themes of family, displacement, and female sexuality. The video piece itself is fifteen minutes long and consists of intimate, colored photographs of Hatoum's mother showering. Hatoum overlays the photographs with letters that her mother, living in Beirut during the civil war, wrote to Hatoum, living in London. Handwritten in Arabic, the letters make up the video's narration and themes, and speak to the difficulty of sending letters in a time of conflict. Hatoum reads the letters aloud in Arabic and English. The video roots itself in the brief family reunion that occurred in Beirut between Hatoum and her parents in 1981. While primarily about the mother–daughter relationship, in her mother's letters Hatoum's father is mentioned and thus the father–daughter relationship as well as the husband–wife relationship is examined in this video.

The elements of the video—the letters, Hatoum's mother's wish to see her, and mentions of the war by Hatoum's mother—explore how the war in Palestine and the war in Lebanon displaced the identity and the relationships of Hatoum and her family. The video is neither a documentary nor meant to be journalistic. The video critiques stereotypes and remains optimistic, since the narration from the letters is largely positive, except about the distance between the mother and the daughter. Hatoum attempts to recreate the moments when she reunited with her mother in Beirut and when she asked to photograph her in the shower. Instead of directly depicting the Israeli–Palestinian conflict or the Lebanese Civil War, Hatoum shows how the conflicts affected her family's relationships and her identity. Hatoum both distances and draws in Western audiences through her narration in English and Arabic.

In this portrait of a Palestinian woman, Hatoum gives her mother a voice while subverting stereotypes about Arab women. The Tate Modern describes the portrait in the following words: "It is through the daughter's art-making project that the mother is able to present herself freely, in a form which cements a bond of identity independent of colonial and patriarchal concerns." Measures of Distance is one of the few works done by Hatoum that speaks directly to her background. In other works, Hatoum prefers to be more abstract and to leave the work open ended. While not as abstract as many of her other works, the viewer is still forced to work through how to understand the formal elements of the video. They are not easily given by Hatoum, as the narration is here. "The video transmits the 'paradoxical state of geographical distance and emotional closeness.'" It underscores her sense of exile and separation caused by war.

Measures of Distance was screened at the London Film Festival, AFI National Video Festival, and the Montreal Women's Film and Video Festival.

=== Grater Divide ===
Made in 2002, Grater Divide transforms an everyday object, in this case a common kitchen grater, into an 80 in × 76 in × 33 in (203 cm × 193 cm × 84 cm) divider, alluding to political alienation, perhaps caused by Israeli-built walls in Palestinian territory.

=== Hot Spot III ===
Hot Spot III, created in 2009, is a large installation piece of the globe tilted like the Earth and about as tall as a person. The title connects to the theme of political unrest, imagining conflict in one geographical area upsetting the whole world. The globe is made of cage-like steel that glows luminescent red, as though the world is ablaze, flickering quickly, meant to create an energetic environment that mesmerizes the audience. The installation also invokes a feeling of danger with the hot red lighting outlining the continents. Hatoum challenges whether minimalist or surrealist forms can adequately address the world's issues.

=== Later work ===
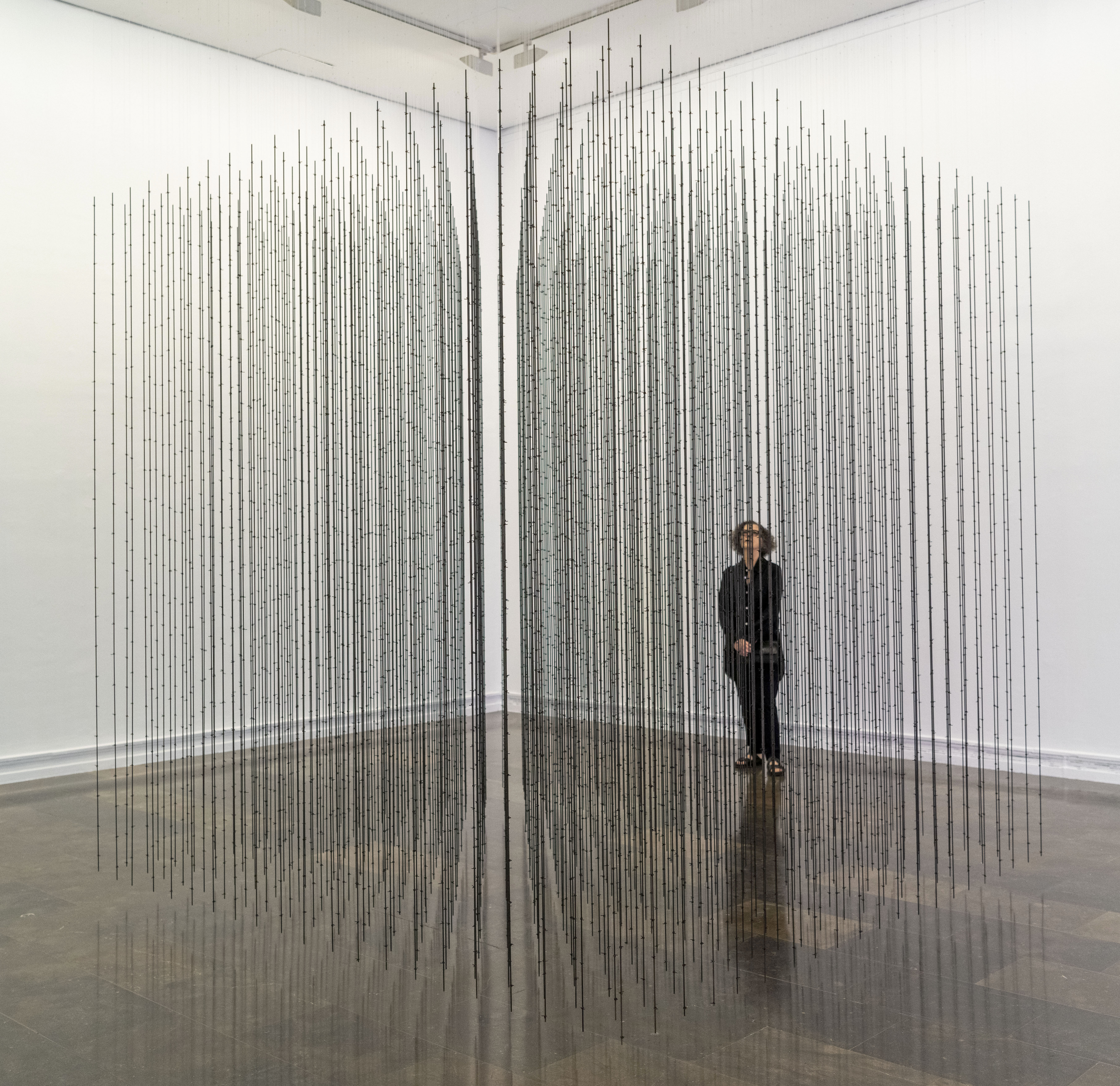
Hatoum regarding her work Impenetrable (1999) exhibited at her solo exhibition in Valencia's IVAM (2021)

In the late 1980s, Hatoum abandoned performances as politically too direct and instead turned her attention to installations and objects, taking up some of the earlier ideas from her student days at the Slade School of Art in London. From then on, she relied on the kind of interactivity that lets the spectator become involved in the aesthetic experience without making the artist as performer the focus of attention.

Since the 1990s, her work has generally shifted from making statements to asking questions. Much more is required of the viewer as performances were replaced by sculptures and installations that required a level of mental and physical interactivity. Her practice has shifted towards site specificity in, for instance, Institute of Contemporary Art, Boston, and Kunsthalle Hamburg.

A notable piece exemplifying her turn from performance to physical objects is Keffieh (1993–1999), a scarf woven of human hair that juxtaposes ideas of femininity and religion.

At the end of the 1980s, she began to focus on common domestic objects—including kitchen utensils and house furnishings. T42 (1993–98) is a pair of teacups fused together at the rim.

=== The body ===
Many of Hatoum's early pieces situate the body as the locus of a network of concerns—political, feminist, and linguistic—thereby eliciting a highly visceral response. One of her pieces, a 1994 video installation called Corps etranger, showed color video images of an endoscopic probe of her body. Corps etranger was originally produced for Centre Georges Pompidou and features a partially enclosed, cylindrical structure that viewers are called to enter. The viewer stands on a circular plate of glass, and video close-up images of internal and external parts of the artist's body. The artist hails the viewer to "walk around" the inside of her body through the visual sequence taken on the endoscope and colonoscope, scanning and probing her digestive system. The audio is a recording of a heartbeat and bodily movements.

The artwork of Hatoum investigates the concept of the 'abjection' introduced by the cultural theorist, Julia Kristeva and the uncanny in her works using body hair.

=== Politics ===
The political possibilities for the uncanny visual motif are relevant to discussions of Hatoum's work, as the disruption achieved at a psychological level can have broad implications involving power, politics, or individual concerns. The allusiveness attained by her work is not always referencing grand political events, or appealing to a generalized cultural consciousness, but instead to a seemingly unattainable threat that is only possible to address on an individual scale.

Hatoum has tied her works to other political movements, especially black struggle. In an interview with Michael Archer in 1997, Hatoum said: "At the beginning it was important to think about the black struggle as a total political struggle. There are common political forces and attitudes that discriminate against people. In the same way as feminism started off with this totalizing concept of 'sisterhood', and then we ended up with many feminisms, if you like. The black struggle became more diversified once the basic issues were established. And blackness here is not to do with the colour of your skin but a political stance."

== Exhibitions ==
Hatoum's work was featured in a solo exhibition at the Institute of Contemporary Art, Boston in 2015. In May 2016, Tate Modern held a "comprehensive exploration into 35 years of Hatoum's work in Britain, from her early performance and video works to her sculpture and large-scale installation" The Menil Collection in Houston, Texas organized a solo exhibition titled "Mona Hatoum: Terra Infirma" that was on view from 12 October 2017 to 25 February 2018. This exhibition then traveled to the Pulitzer Arts Foundation and was on view from 6 April to 11 August 2018.

In March 2018, Hatoum was shortlisted for the Hepworth Prize for Sculpture, alongside Michael Dean, Phillip Lai, Magali Reus and Cerith Wyn Evans. In January 2020, Hatoum was part of Artpace's exhibit titled Visibilities: Intrepid Women of Artpace. Also in 2020, she received the Julio González award, featuring in a solo exhibition at Institut Valencià d'Art Modern in 2021.

Mona Hatoum at White Cube Seoul (2025)

In 2025, Hatoum held her first solo exhibition in South Korea at White Cube Seoul. The survey spanned 25 years of her career, showcasing over 20 sculptures and works on paper. The exhibition focused on themes of containment, the "abject" body, and the subversion of domestic or medical objects.

Major Works and Themes

The exhibition debuted several new works that utilized Hatoum’s signature motifs of grids and barriers:

• Divide (2025): A three-part, life-size hospital screen. Hatoum replaced the traditional cloth panels with gridded barbed wire, transforming a symbol of medical privacy into a barrier of exposure and physical threat.

• Mirror (2025): A wall-mounted cage made of rebar. Despite the title, the work lacks a reflective surface, instead using a gridded lattice to distort the viewer's perspective as they move.

• Untitled (fence, mirrored) (2018): A work on paper featuring a chain-link fence pattern superimposed on a reflective coating, exploring the relationship between the witness and the restricted space.

== Awards ==
- 2008 – Rolf Schock Prize in Visual Arts
- 2011 – Joan Miró Prize, Fundació Joan Miró
- 2017 – 10th Hiroshima Art Prize, Hiroshima City Museum of Contemporary Art, Hiroshima
- 2018 – Whitechapel Gallery Art Icon
- 2019 – Praemium Imperiale for the sculpture category, in recognition of her lifetime achievement in the medium
- 2021 – Julio González Price 2020

== See also ==
- Palestinian art
