= Cécile B. Evans =

American artist

- Born: 1983 (age 42–43)
- Education: New York University
- Known for: Video, Performance, Installation, Sculpture

Cécile B. Evans (born 1983) is a Belgian-American artist who lives and works in London. Evans is known for their use of video, installation, sculpture and performance, focusing on the value of emotion in contemporary society and its rebellion as it comes into contact with physical, ideological, and technological structures.

== Early life ==
Evans attended New York University for acting in method acting and experimental theatre. Evans worked as an actress until they started making art. As an actress, Evans also worked as a makeup artist in various department stores, along with bartending, waitressing, and being a secret food critic. They moved from New York to Paris to Berlin throughout their adulthood, and has now settled in London.

== Career ==
Evans has been active in many solo and group exhibitions over the years, and is well known for their pieces "Hyperlinks or it Didn't Happen" (2014) and "What the Heart Wants" (2016). These works have been shown as installations and screened. Evans' first large project, "Hyperlinks or it Didn't Happen" has been exhibited at the Projections New York Film Festival, Seventeen Gallery, Santa Barbara Museum of Contemporary Art, Artspace, Sydney Biennale, and Garage Museum. "How Happy a Thing Can Be" (2014), another video made the same year, was co-commissioned by Wysing Arts Centre and RADAR/Loughborough University. It has been exhibited in Art Basel, Kunsthalle Wien, Whitney Museum, Ural Industrial Biennial, and CentroCentro (ARCO). Evans' project, "What the Heart Wants" was included in the Berlin Bienniale, Artspace, the GARAGE Museum, and Kunsthalle Winterthur. Evans' work, Amos' World (2018) has been exhibited at places such as Mumok, Tramway, Château Shatto, and Madre Museum. Evans has also been the recipient of a number or art awards, including the Frieze Art Fair's Emdash Award (2012), Palais de Tokyo/Orange's Push Your Art Prize (2013), Schering Stiftung (2016), illy Present Future Prize (2016), and is shortlisted for the Jarman Award (2019).

In 2024, Miuccia Prada commissioned Evans with creating Reception!, a short film and installation which served as the backdrop for the Miu Miu Fall/Winter 2024–25 runway show during Paris Fashion Week.

== Works ==
- "What the Heart Wants" (2016) is video installation that looks at what it could mean to be human, and who or what will be considered human, in the future.
- "Hyperlinks or it Didn't Happen" (2014) is a video about a group of digital beings that search for their meaning.
- "How Happy a Thing Can Be" (2014) is a short video that follows a screwdriver, scissors and comb as their emotional limits are pushed.
- "Sprung a Leak" (2016) is an automated play performed by three robots and three humans as they cope with emotionally charged information leaking from a system that surrounds them.
- "Amos' World" (2018) is a mock TV series and video installation about an architect, his "socially progressive housing estate", and the inhabitants who are quickly alienated by the building. Chris Sharratt writes that it "is not a didactic unpicking of modernist thinking and aesthetics. Instead, the exhibition acts as an allegory for a recurring concern in Evans's work: 'how digital technology impacts the human condition.'... a tale of individual hubris brought to heel by collective resistance, of lost souls finding networked ways to turn solitary grievances into communal action.".
- Reality or Not (2023) takes on the reality tv format and follows a group of Parisian teenagers interested in forging their own world and opportunities. Reality or Not is being included in Worlds Apart, a video exhibition at the Pérez Art Museum Miami, Florida, in 2025.

== "What the Heart Wants" (2016) ==
"What the Heart Wants" (2016) was first exhibited in November 2016 and was also Evans first museum exhibition. It is Evans' most extensive piece to date. Evans examines a future timeline in which technology is the basis of society and the lines between humanity and robot have become extremely blurred, as well as how they shape each other. The main character, HYPER, narrates what it means to be a person over the course of the 41- minute film. Unlimited power has been given to a company that has control over personal information, and has taken the form of a woman (HYPER). She has become "human", and struggles with the subjective nature of the world. Evans uses topics such as stem cell research, dress codes, terrorism, systemic oppression, and other large organizational structures to discuss this idea. The film also shows both the progress and problems that have arisen in society as time has passed, and based on the choices people and organizational systems have made. The film follows other obscure characters, such as a large collection of ears, pair of lovers, an immortal cell, and a robot, as they explore what it means to be a human. Some characters from past works of Evans' appear as well (AGNES, PHIL, Invisible Woman).

== Collections ==
Evans' work is held in the permanent collections of the Whitney Museum of American Art, Castello di Rivoli, the Louisiana Museum of Modern Art and the Museum of Modern Art, New York.
