= Contemporary Art Society =

UK charity

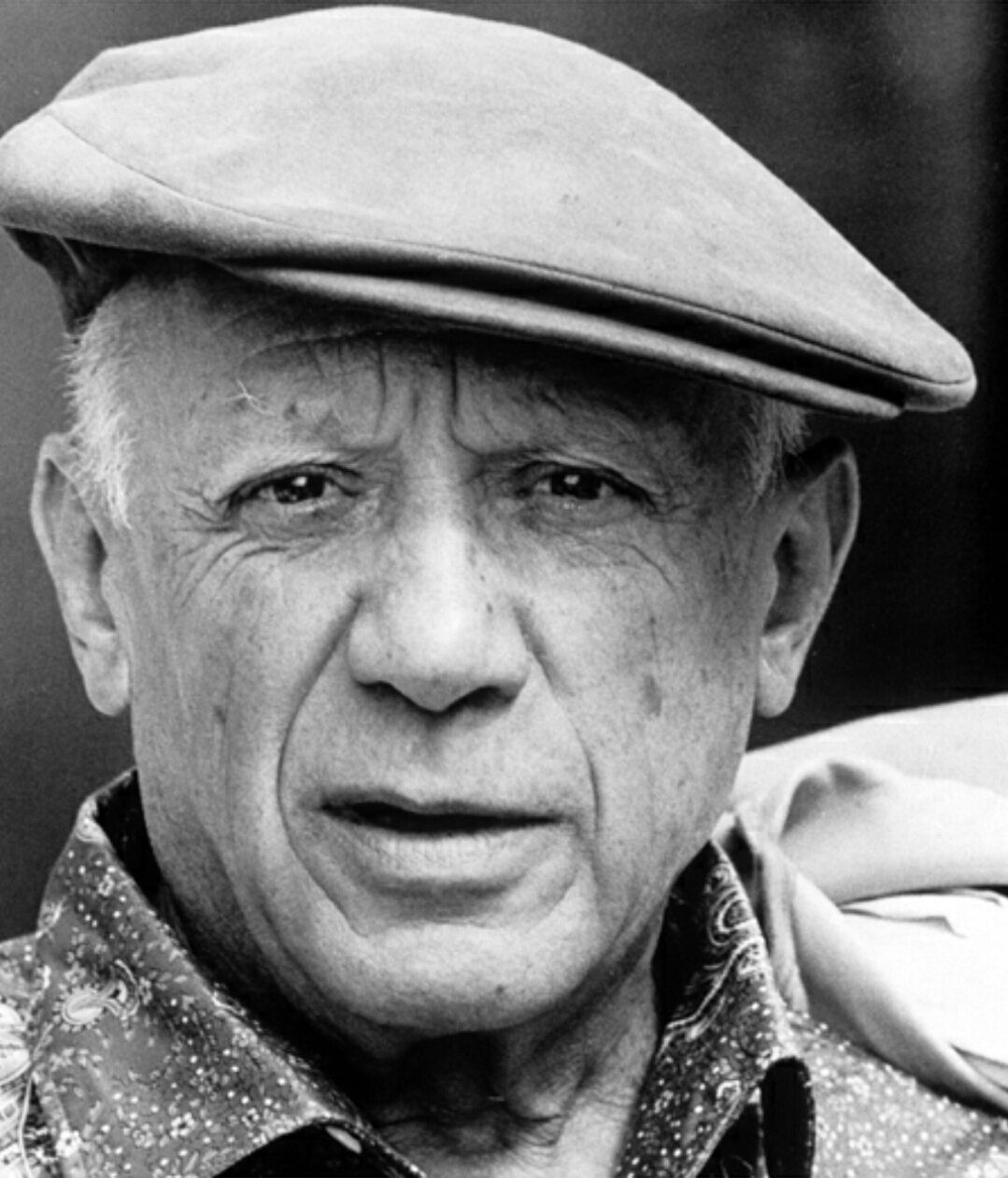
The CAS bought the first work by Pablo Picasso to enter a UK public collection (Tate) in 1933.

The Contemporary Art Society (CAS) is a British charity founded in 1910 that champions the collecting of outstanding contemporary art and craft for museum collections in the UK. From the 1930s until around 1989, the society also donated works to Commonwealth museums, but since 1989 the focus has remained exclusively on UK institutions.

Each year, the CAS donates works of modern and contemporary art to more than 70 museums and public galleries in the UK, which subscribe as Museum Members. Notable acquisitions have included the first works by Paul Gauguin (1917), Dame Barbara Hepworth (1931), Pablo Picasso (1933), Henri Matisse (1935), Francis Bacon (1952), Sir Anthony Caro (1965), Sir Antony Gormley (1981) and Damien Hirst (1992) to enter UK public collections. More recent acquisitions have included works by 2016 Turner Prize winner Helen Marten in 2012, Phyllida Barlow in the same year and in 2016 the first works by Glenn Brown and Kader Attia to enter a UK museum collection.

== Funding ==
The Contemporary Art Society raises funds from a number of sources. 12% of its income comes from Arts Council England as a National Portfolio Organisation (NPO), the remainder raised is a combination of private and corporate philanthropy, income from fundraising events and art consultancy services.

== History ==
The Contemporary Art Society was established by seven prominent individuals whose vision it was to do for contemporary art what the National Art Collections Fund, founded in 1903, was doing for art of earlier periods.

An inaugural meeting took place on the morning of 9 April 1909 at 44 Bedford Square, London, the home of Philip Morrell, and was attended by Charles Aitken, Director of the Whitechapel Art Gallery; Roger Fry, painter/critic and curator of Metropolitan Museum of Art, New York; Charles J Holmes, painter/critic and Director of the National Portrait Gallery; Ernest Marsh, expert on Martinware pottery; DS MacColl, painter/critic and the first Keeper of the Tate Gallery's collection; Philip Morrell, a Liberal MP and Lady Ottoline Morrell, patron of the arts.

Lady Ottoline Morrell recorded in her diary after that first meeting:

"…. I feel strongly that every penny one can save ought to be given to young artists. At least, we who really feel the beauty and wonder of art ought to help them. There are heaps of people who understand philanthropy…. and young creators have such a terrible struggle."

It was not until 18 May 1910 that the name of the Contemporary Art Society was settled upon. 1910 also saw its first purchase, Augustus John's Smiling Woman, 1908–09, which was presented to Tate in 1917. First public collections to join the CAS as members were the Ulster Museum, Belfast; New Walk Museum & Art Gallery, Leicester; and Manchester Art Gallery, all in 1912.

The Contemporary Art Society laid the foundation of the Tate's modern collection in the early years of the organisation. In 1917 Tate was reconstituted in its dual capacity as the National Gallery of British Art, with special responsibility for modern British art, and for the first time as the National Gallery of Modern Foreign Art. At this period the Tate had no government grant, so the acquisition of modern art had to be financed out of small private funds. The largest of these was the Chantrey Bequest, which was controlled by the Council of the Royal Academy and had very conservative taste. It was left to the CAS to see that some more adventurous work by British artists came into the Tate collection. In the 1920s this meant mainly Camden Town and Bloomsbury painting and the artists who showed with the London Group.

In 1919 the prints and drawings fund was founded, led by Campbell Dodgson, Keeper of Prints and Drawings at the British Museum. Initially having a separate subscription fee, the purchased works were shown throughout the country before being donated to the British Museum, who held their own exhibitions of the works in 1924, 1936 and 1940.

The CAS's first Pottery and Craft Fund was set up by Ernest Marsh in 1928, which used modest funds to build up representative collections of the crafts in major centres. This had ceased to function by 1949, but the CAS has acquired craft through various schemes throughout its history, most recently through the Omega Fund, which was set up in 2014.

In 1947, HM Queen Elizabeth The Queen Mother became Royal Patron of the Contemporary Art Society, a position she held until her death in 2002.

In 1998 Arts Council England awarded the CAS a £2.5 million grant from National Lottery capital funds to establish the Special Collections Scheme, through which 610 works by 313 artists and makers were purchased for 18 collections across England in order to develop "challenging collections" of contemporary art in regional museums. This included work by Jeremy Deller, Tracey Emin, Damien Hirst, Goshka Macuga, Tony Oursler, Grayson Perry, Yinka Shonibare, Tomoko Takahashi, Gillian Wearing and Richard Wright, and commissions by Christian Boltanski, Bill Fontana and William Furlong.

Alongside this, the National Collecting Scheme for Scotland (established 2003) enabled contemporary artwork to be purchased for six museums and galleries in Scotland, including work by Claire Barclay, Martin Boyce, Graham Fagen, Jim Lambie and Julian Opie.

Following the end of the Special Collections Scheme in 2005, the new Director of the CAS Paul Hobson brought in a number of new fundraising initiatives, including a Patrons Scheme from 2007 and annual fundraising galas (2009–2014). In recent years the organisation has run "Artist's Table" dinners, hosted by high profile artists in their studios including Antony Gormley, Grayson Perry, Lynette Yiadom-Boakye and Gillian Wearing and Michael Landy.

Taking over in 2013, Caroline Douglas introduced a number of new purchasing schemes and special projects, launching Great Works, Valeria Napoleone XX Contemporary Art Society, the Jackson Tang Ceramics Award and partnering with Frieze Art Fair for the Collections Fund at Frieze.

=== ARTfutures ===
In 1984 the annual Contemporary Art Society Art Market was staged for the first time, later to become ARTfutures. Between 1984 and 1993 these were held at Smith's Gallery in Covent Garden, supported by "The Queen of Covent Garden" Christina Smith. ARTfutures sold works by emerging artists selected by CAS curators, with the commission raising funds for the society. It gained sponsorship from Bloomberg from 2002 and was subsequently held at Bloomberg Space in London until its final edition in 2002.

== Acquisition Schemes ==
Accredited museums in the UK can be Member Museums of the Contemporary Art Society through the separate Fine Art and Craft (Omega Fund) acquisition schemes. Member Museums pay an annual subscription. Member Museums are eligible to receive gifts and bequests through the CAS, to apply to the Special Projects acquisition funds, as well as being offered funds once every four years to purchase a work of art or craft with CAS support.

In 2008 the Fine Art and Craft acquisition schemes were relaunched, basing themselves on the methodology developed through the Special Collections Scheme. All acquisitions are made on a research-lead basis, where CAS staff work closely with the curators and staff of its Museum Members. Previously work was acquired by individuals on the CAS's buying committee, according to their individual taste, with curators from the Museum Members subsequently putting in bids for the works that had been purchased.

== Gifts and bequests ==
In 1957 Robert Sainsbury, a major patron of the arts, gifted the CAS a sum of £1,600 to be used for the acquisition of four paintings by Francis Bacon. W. A. Evill and Loraine Conran from the CAS Executive Committee subsequently selected Figures in a Landscape (1956), donated to Birmingham Museums and Art Gallery; Study for Figure No 4 (1956), donated to the Art Gallery of South Australia; Study of Figure no 6 (1957), donated to Hatton Gallery, Newcastle University; and Study for a Portrait of Van Gogh IV (1957), donated to Tate.

Tom Bendhem served on the CAS committee from 1984 to 1992 and upon his death in 2002 left his entire art collection and a property in Kensington to the charity. Much of the art was distributed to CAS museum members and the proceeds from the sale of the property secured a permanent headquarters for the CAS at 59 Central Street, London.

Nancy Balfour was Chair of the CAS from 1976 to 1982 and President from 1984 to 1997 and built up a major collection of contemporary art from 1943 until her death in 1997. This collection was bequeathed to the CAS in its entirety, with over 100 subsequently donated to museums across the UK. The rest of the works were auctioned at Phillips in 1999 and the proceeds went towards the work of the organisation.

== Contemporary Art Society Consultancy ==
Contemporary Art Society Consultancy is an art advisory service for corporate clients and including companies, developers, hospitals, local authorities and universities. The consultancy curates public art projects, manage corporate art collections and produce cultural strategies for developers and local authorities. The fees charged for these services support the charitable mission of the society.

The Contemporary Art Society's consultancy services originated in 1976 through a corporate membership scheme set up by Pauline Vogelpoel, then Organising Secretary of the society, and its President, Nancy Balfour. Balfour proposed that companies might buy experimental works for presentation, while the Society would reciprocate with loans or advice on purchases of art for their collections. [minutes, 23/02/1976] Vogelpoel helped Mobil to buy prints for its new London building, which brought the Society a donation of £1,000. In 1977, the first important corporate contact was established with De Beers, and in 1988 Consultancy Art Society Projects was formally created. During the 1980s, the CAS became a major advisor to corporate art collections, working with, among others, ICI, Unilever, and Stanhope Properties plc.

In recent years the business has expanded to include public art projects and cultural strategies, alongside its corporate clients. These have included commissions at Heathrow Terminal 5, the Olympic Park in London and a series of works by artists including Mark Wallinger and Richard Wilson for the LSE. In 2017 the CAS managed the commissioning of a new public monument by Gillian Wearing OBE depicting suffragist leader Dame Millicent Fawcett (1847–1929), the first-ever monument of a woman, created by a woman, to be sited in Parliament Square. CAS Consultancy also managed the commission of a major work at the Supreme Court in London by Catherine Yass in 2019, celebrating 100 years of women in law.

In 2012 the Contemporary Art Society Consultancy developed its first public art strategy for Cambridge University's North West Cambridge development, a 15-year programme of commissioning temporary and permanent projects. Other major cultural strategies since then have included country-wide public art guidelines for Qatar, the City of London's Culture Mile and a placemaking strategy for the Royal Docks in London.
