= Jess Flood-Paddock =

British sculptor

Jessie Flood-Paddock (born 1977, London, England) is a British sculptor living and working in London.

Flood-Paddock studied at Royal College of Art (2003–05), Slade School of Fine Art (1996–2000), London and The School of the Art Institute of Chicago Art Institute of Chicago (1999).

Flood-Paddock first came to wider attention in 2010 for her solo exhibition 'Gangsta's Paradise', Hayward Gallery Project Space, London, that centred on a sculpture of a giant lobster. Her work often is monumental in scale, commenting on our consumer society.

In June 2011, Flood-Paddock had a solo exhibition at the Carl Freedman Gallery of new sculpture called Fantastic Voyage. and again in 2014 for a solo show called 'Nude' which was reviewed by Frieze Magazine. Flood-Paddock was named as 'Artist of the week' by the Guardian Media Group's theguardian.com website in July 2011.

In 2012, Flood-Paddock collaborated on an artwork with British fashion designer Jonathan Saunders for Britain Creates, which concluded with an exhibition at the V&A. In 2012, Flood-Paddock had a solo exhibition at Tate Britain, London.

In 2017, the Tetley Gallery in Leeds hosted an exhibition Refinding bringing together new and recent works by Flood-Paddock, along with the Oak Tree series of sculptures, drawings and prints by 20th century sculptor, the late Kenneth Armitage. Flood-Paddock was awarded a Kenneth Armitage Fellowship (2013–2015), which enabled her to live and work in Armitage's studio for two years.
