= Helen Marten =

English artist (born 1985)

- Born: Helen Elizabeth Marten; 1985 (age 40–41); Macclesfield, United Kingdom
- Awards: Turner Prize
- Website: helenmarten.weebly.com

Helen Elizabeth Marten (born 1985 in Macclesfield) is an English artist based in London who works in sculpture, video, and installation art. Marten studied at the Ruskin School of Drawing and Fine Art at the University of Oxford (2005–2008) and Central Saint Martins (2004). Her work has been included in the 56th Venice Biennale and the 20th Biennale of Sydney. She has won the 2012 LUMA Award (from the LUMA Foundation), the Prix Lafayette in 2011, the inaugural Hepworth Prize and the Turner Prize, both in 2016. Marten is represented by Greene Naftali Gallery in New York, and Sadie Coles HQ.

== Early life and education ==
Marten is one of three children, and the only one in her family to be artistically driven. Her twin sister is an accountant, her father a pharmacist, and her mother a biologist with a PhD in the semiotics of racism. Marten has described her family as "deeply encouraging".

After attending the private school King's School in Macclesfield, Marten studied at the Ruskin School of Drawing and Fine Art at the University of Oxford from 2005 to 2008, and then Central Saint Martins in London in 2004.

== Career ==
Marten's work includes sculpture, screen-printing and writing. Helen has used handmade and found objects within her work, including cotton buds, coins, shoe soles, limes, marbles, eggs and snooker chalk. The artist has expressed a particular interest in language, stating: "Language is a system that we know very well how to exploit and wrap around things. Words are communicating, but at the same time they're tumbling about themselves in a very knotty chaos of pictures and images." Like her physical works, Marten's texts and titles reflect and reinforce her play and logic. "If Marten's objects are treasures found in some future archeological dig, then perhaps her texts provide a map or a diagram for the products of that digging."

Marten's first British solo show was in 2012, at the Chisenhale Gallery in London.

On winning the Hepworth Prize for Sculpture in November 2016, she announced that she would share the £30,000 prize money with the three others on the shortlist, saying: "In the light of the world's ever lengthening political shadow, the art world has a responsibility to show how democracy should work. I was flattered to be on the shortlist and even more so if my fellow nominees would share the Prize with me". She added: "Here's to a furthering of communality and a platform for everyone". Similarly, after winning the Turner Prize the following month the BBC reported that she had told it that she also planned to share it "but felt she could only make such a public proclamation once", and quoted her as saying: "This is something that can happen much more discreetly between the four of us". Marten was included in BBC Radio 4's Front Row round-up of 2016's major arts and entertainment award winners.

For the Turner Prize, 2016 exhibition, held at Tate Britain, Marten included three works from the exhibitions for which she was nominated: her presentation at the 56th Venice Biennale and Eucalyptus, Let us in at Greene Naftali Gallery, New York. Focusing on rhythms of rest and work, the sculptures were reconceived at Tate Britain as a single installation. They consisted of: Lunar Nibs (a sculpture resembling a house, a dumpster and even a feeding trough for cattle, whose main facade looked like a caricatured nineteenth-century residence), On aerial greens (haymakers), (a wall- and floor-based pairing formally resembling a fireplace or hearth) and Brood and Bitter Pass (a large-scale work composed of spun aluminium forms, wooden ellipsoids, ceramic parts and mechanical joints in a worm-like form).

== Critical reception ==
Writing about her year-long touring exhibition, Almost the exact shape of Florida at Kunsthalle Zürich, Plank Salad at Chisenhale Gallery in London (2012) and No borders in a wok that can't be crossed at the Center for Curatorial Studies at Bard College (2013), the curators of the three exhibitions called them "one of the most fertile, and one might say febrile, artistic productions of our time, cannily utilizing the potential of both the analogue and digital to make sculptures, videos, and installations that collapse traditional forms and boundaries of matter, language, and meaning". Jörg Heiser has written of her work: "Marten treats physical stuff the digital way: she drags and drops, compresses and unpacks, crashes and reboots."

Reviewing Marten's 2012 show Plank Salad for The Guardian, Adrian Searle concluded: "Marten makes you want to look very closely at the things she makes and the traces she leaves. Her way of thinking, with its word salads and trap-door metaphors, is dangerously infectious. I hate the idea of artists as rising stars, because they all too often turn into next year’s burned-out asteroids. But imagine what Marten might do with an asteroid. Rarely have I been so struck."

"Helen Marten: an artist who thinks differently from the rest of us. ...Too many younger artists have suffered from too much success too soon, eventually getting better and better at less and less, trapped in an early signature style. The point is to go beyond it. Marten knows this; thinking differently is the way to go."

== Collections ==
Marten's work is in the collections of Astrup Fearnley Museum of Modern Art, Oslo, Norway, and Fondazione Sandretto Re Rebaudengo, Turin, Italy. Her work is in the collection of the Museum of Modern Art, New York.

== Awards ==
- 2016 – The Hepworth Prize for Sculpture
- 2016 – Turner Prize

== Art market ==
Until 2022, Marten was represented by Johann König.

== Bibliography ==
- Archer, Michael; Atkins, Ed; Eccles, Tom (24 May 2013). Eccles, Tom; Ruf, Beatrix; Staple, Polly (eds.). Helen Marten (Bilingual ed.). JRP-Ringier. ISBN 978-3037643464.
- Diederichsen, Diedrich; Burton, Johanna (25 October 2016). Pfeffer, Susanne (ed.). Helen Marten: Parrot Problems. Artist, Designer: Helen Marten. Koenig Books. ISBN 978-3863358761.
