= Yoko Terauchi =

Japanese sculptor (born 1954)

Yoko Terauchi (born 1954) is an artist who makes sculpture and artists books, interested in concepts of the one, whole and interior and exterior.

== Life and career ==
Terauchi was born in 1954 in Tokyo, Japan. She studied at the Department of Art and Design at Women's Art University in Japan, completing her degree in 1977 and Graduate School in 1978. Terauchi then moved to London, where she studied the Advanced Course in Sculpture course at Saint Martins' School of Art between 1979 and 1981.

Terauchi has since continued to exhibit regularly in the UK and internationally, including in Japan where she returned to live. Her practice consists predominantly of sculptural installations and book works. She is currently holds a position of professor at Aichi University of the Arts, Tokyo.

In 1984 Yoko Terauchi, at the request of Leeds Art Gallery and the Henry Moore Centre, spent a week in Leeds, UK, making a new piece of sculpture in Leeds Art Gallery. Terauchi made the new work publicly within the gallery space, interacting with visitors and school groups throughout the week who were able to ask questions about her working process. During this time she produced the work Hot Line 19, part of a series of works she made using industrial English telephone cables.

== Publications ==
Terauchi published a number of artist books through the Coracle Press including One, 2012 -Coil/Join, 1994 - Cuckoo, 1992 - Paper Wire and Lead ,1986.

The book work Ebb and Flow, also produced by Coracle Press in 1988, is held by Henry Moore Foundation Sculpture Research Library Special Collections.

Out of Mind Out of Sight, Published by Fruitmarket Gallery and Chisenhale Gallery, Edinburgh/London, 1994. Exhibition catalogue for the exhibition that showed at both galleries.

== Selected exhibitions ==
London-Aichi, SAKURA AUA Gallery, Nagoya, Japan, 2019

Standing Point 1, Keio University Art Centre, Tokyo, Japan, 2017

Schema – Sukima, Laure Genillard Gallery, London, UK, 2014

Aerial Tower, Aichi University of the Art Satellite Gallery, Nagakute, Japan, 2010

Hot Line, Museum für Post und Kommunikation, Berlin, Germany, 1996

Air Castle, Chisenhale Gallery, London, UK, 1994

Sculptors at work, Cathedral Precincts, Canterbury, UK, 1985

Pool: Yoko Terauchi, South London Gallery, London, UK, 1985

Making Sculpture, Leeds Art Gallery, Leeds, UK, 1984
