= Phyllida Barlow =

British artist (1944–2023)

Dame Phyllida Barlow DBE RA
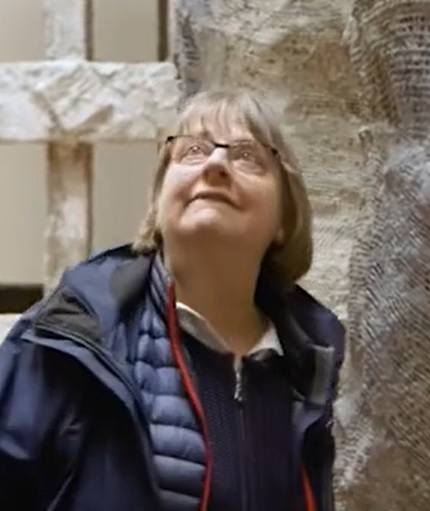
- Barlow in 2019
- Born: 4 April 1944; Newcastle upon Tyne, England
- Died: 12 March 2023 (aged 78)
- Education: Chelsea College of Art; Slade School of Fine Art; University College, London
- Known for: Sculpture

Dame Gillian Phyllida Barlow DBE RA (4 April 1944 – 12 March 2023) was a British visual artist. She studied at Chelsea College of Art (1960–1963) and the Slade School of Art (1963–1966). She joined the staff of the Slade in the late 1960s and taught there for more than forty years. She retired from academia in 2009 and in turn became an emerita professor of fine art. She had an important influence on younger generations of artists; at the Slade her students included Rachel Whiteread and Ángela de la Cruz. In 2017 she represented Great Britain at the Venice Biennale.

== Early life and education ==
Although born in Newcastle upon Tyne, England, in 1944 (as her psychiatrist father Erasmus Darwin Barlow, a great-grandson of Charles Darwin, was stationed there at the time), Barlow was brought up in a London recovering from the Second World War. She studied at Chelsea College of Art (1960–63) under the tutelage of George Fullard who was to influence Barlow's perception of what sculpture can be. "Fullard, among others, was able to impart that the act of making was in itself an adventure. The family moved to Richmond, west London, after the war, and her childhood experiences of bomb damage would inspire much of her lifelong work. A sculpture that falls over or breaks is just as exciting as one that reveals itself perfectly formed. All the acts of making in the world are there to be plundered and contain within themselves the potential to be transferred to the studio and adapted."

Whilst studying at Chelsea, Barlow met her husband, the artist and writer Fabian Benedict Peake, the son of Mervyn Peake, author of Gormenghast, and his wife the artist and memoirist Maeve Gilmore. She later attended the Slade School of Fine Art from 1963 to 1966 to further study sculpture. Described by The Independent as "a British art dynasty", Barlow and her husband had five children together, including the artists Eddie Peake and Florence Peake.

== Career ==
After graduating from Slade School of Art in 1966, Barlow began a forty-year-long career as a teacher in various institutions, starting with a part-time teaching position in sculpture at the former West of England College of Art, now known as the University of the West of England, Bristol. While here, she learned traditional techniques of sculpture and discovered an affinity for the malleability of clay. Barlow found an interest in everyday, convenient materials like cardboard, polystyrene, scrim, and cement and how she could create abstracted pieces of work that placed a sense of elevated meaning to them. Forming an environment in which her viewers can reflect on the work and explore the material and processes used to create it was one of her main motivations in her practice. In 2004 she was appointed professor of fine art and director of undergraduate studies at Slade School of Art before retiring from teaching in 2009 at the age of 65, deciding to focus on her own art. She believed that art schools placed too big an emphasis on a particular 'model' of how to be an artist.

Barlow's break as an artist came in 2004 when she was shown at the BALTIC, Gateshead. This was followed by representation by Hauser & Wirth. In 2018 and 2019, Barlow was 'provocateur' for the Yorkshire Sculpture international.

== Work ==
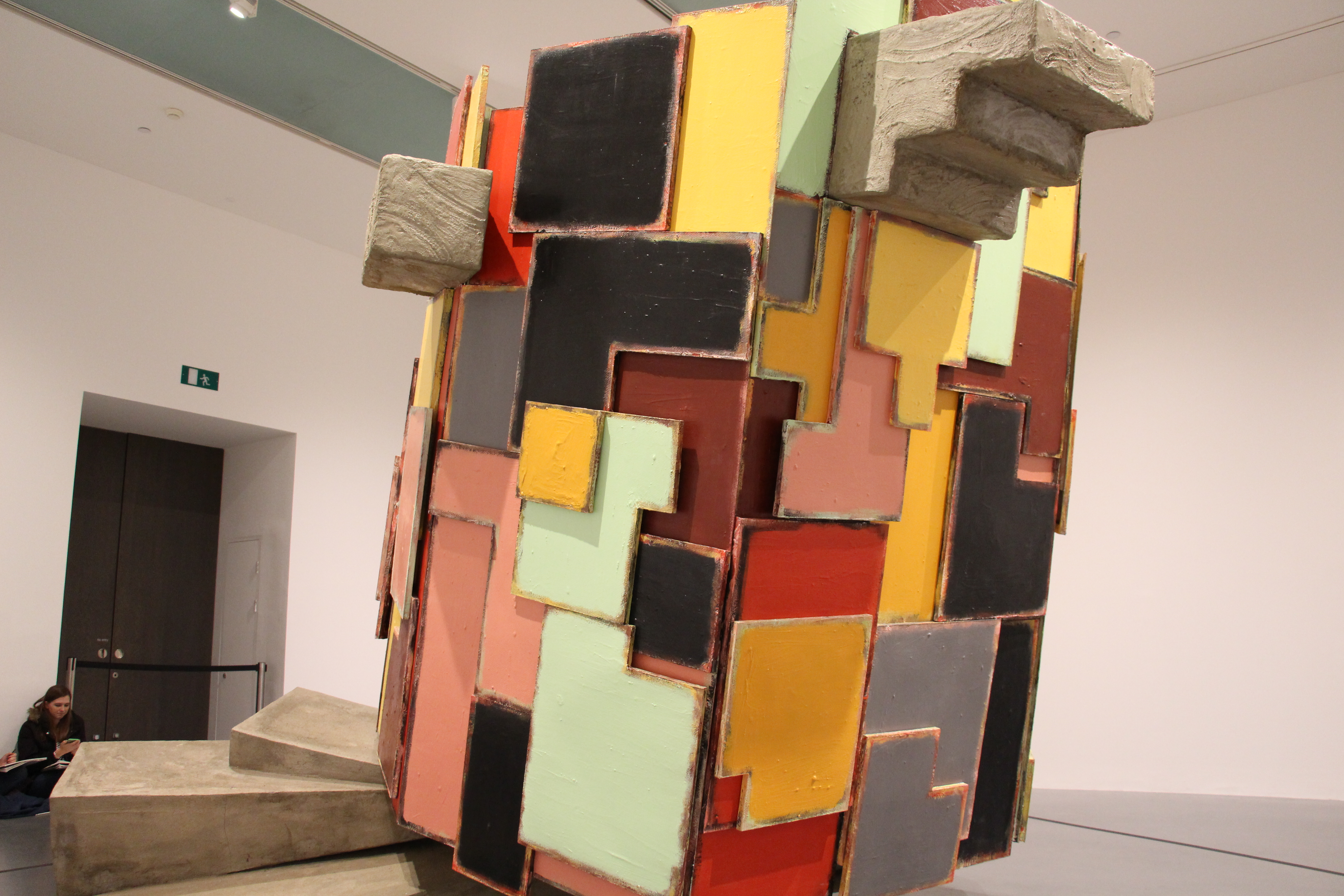
untitled: upturnedhouse2, 2012 (2012)

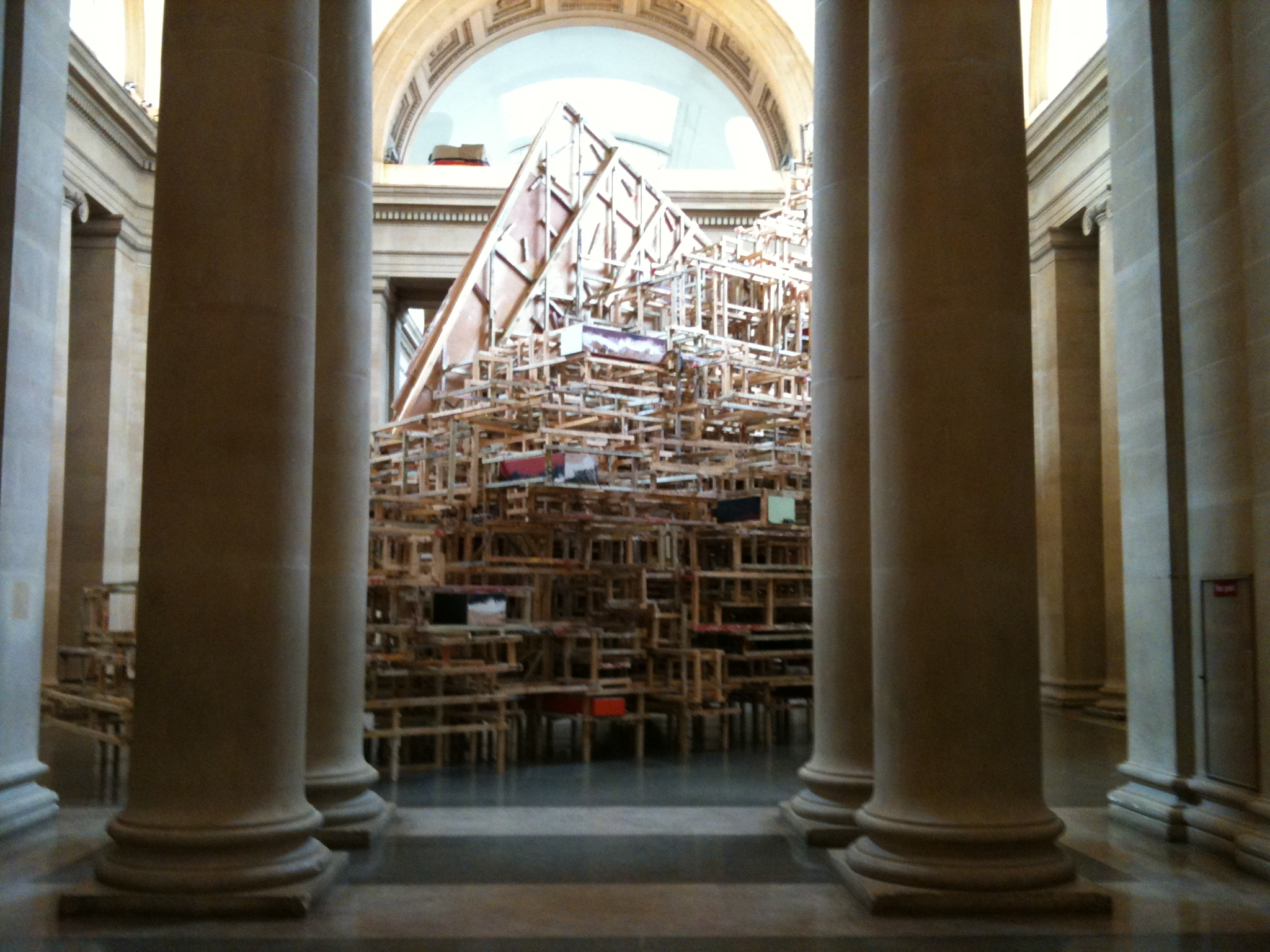
dock (2014) by Phyllida Barlow at Tate Britain

Barlow's work is a combination of playful and intimidating. The child like colours she painted her sculptures, almost referencing toys is in deep contrast to the industrial materials and scale of her works. Her sculptures tower above the viewer as if a huge section of scaffolding. She played with mass, scale, volume and height which creates a tension to her forms. Her forms give the impression of being both excruciatingly heavy and light as air simultaneously. When in the presence of her sculpture, one loses the sense of object and is entered into an environment. Barlow did not hide her process and material choices from the viewer, she exposed each detail.

Best known for her colossal sculptural projects, Barlow employed "a distinctive vocabulary of inexpensive materials such as plywood, cardboard, plaster, cement, fabric and paint" to create striking sculptures. Drawing on memories of familiar objects from her surroundings, Barlow's practice was grounded in an anti-monumental tradition characterised by her physical experience of handling materials, which she transformed through processes of layering, accumulation and juxtaposition. "Obtrusive and invasive, Barlow's large-scale sculptural objects are frequently arranged in complex installations in which mass and volume seem to be at odds with the space around them. Their role is restless and unpredictable: they block, interrupt, intervene, straddle and perch, both dictating and challenging the experience of viewing." Her constructions are often crudely painted in industrial or synthetic colours, resulting in abstract, seemingly unstable forms.

Maybe I don't think enough about beauty in my work because I'm so curious about other qualities, abstract qualities of time, weight, balance, rhythm; collapse and fatigue versus the more upright dynamic notions of maybe posture ... the state that something might be in. Is it growing or shrinking, is it going up or down, is it folding or unfolding?

— Phyllida Barlow, The Guardian, 2016.

Barlow was also a prolific painter, yet even in this field she recognised they were "sculptural drawings". She painted as part of her curriculum at the Chelsea College of Arts - where she was encouraged to practice by artist and sculptor Henry Moore - and carried on doing so throughout her life as an artist, accruing a vast archive of work.

== Solo exhibitions ==
Barlow's work has been presented in solo exhibitions around the world. In 2014, Barlow was commissioned to create new work for the Duveen Galleries at Tate Britain, London.

After being awarded the Kunstpreis Aachen in 2012, Barlow was commissioned to do a solo exhibition for the Ludwig Forum für Internationale Kunst in Germany. The exhibition Brink featured seven expansive sculptures creating a "stage-like arena" for her fictive city.

In 2013, Barlow presented a solo exhibition entitled HOARD at The Norton Museum of Art in West Palm Beach, Florida, U.S. It was the Norton's third exhibition of RAW – Recognition of Art by Women – made possible by the Leonard and Sophie Davis Fund/MLDauray Arts Institute.

2015 saw Barlow's work travelling up to Scotland to be installed in the Fruitmarket Gallery in Edinburgh. The exhibition was called 'Set' and consisted of new works which were specifically produced for the show. Her work took over the gallery transforming it into an all consuming environment of bright matter. Her forms undulated through the gallery space with the intention of creating an argument or tension between the two floors of the gallery; "The upstairs space shrugging its shoulders at the downstairs space" as Barlow herself put it.

In 2016, Barlow presented a solo exhibition of new work at the Kunsthalle Zurich. Barlow was one of four artists to have been nominated for the inaugural Hepworth prize, the UK's first prize for sculpture, and hers was displayed at the Hepworth Wakefield starting in October 2016.

For the 2017 Venice Biennale, Barlow unveiled her powerfully industrial and bulbous Folly series, which took over both a sanitised indoor space and the idyllic Venetian outdoors. Barlow initially planned for her installation of 41 'baubles' to be hanging from planks that jutted from facade of the pavilion but this vision had to be altered due to expense; they were ultimately displayed in a way that resembled lollipops. Graham Sheffield, the Director Arts at the British Council at the time, wrote that Barlow was selected for her "challenging and imposing sculptures" which unsurprisingly commanded a distinct and powerful presence at the 57th Biennale.

During the course of 2018, Barlow presented three solo shows. Hauser & Wirth curated the exhibition entitled 'tilt', which was held in their New York City gallery. In New York she also exhibited with High Line Art, with the show 'prop'. In the UK in 2018 Barlow's show 'Quarry' was held in Edinburgh, Scotland, at Jupiter Artland.

In 2019 the Royal Academy of Art (of which she was elected an Academician in 2011) hosted exhibition of a new collection of Barlow's work entitled cultural-de-sac. Her work was situated in the Gabrielle Jungels-Winkler Galleries. The works were a site specific collection of large scale, brutalist sculptures which were created in response to the architecture of the RA building.

A posthumous exhibition of Barlow's work, Disruptor, was staged at Wolterton Hall in May 2026.

== Honours and awards ==
Barlow became a Royal Academician in 2011. She was appointed Commander of the Order of the British Empire (CBE) in the 2015 New Year Honours for services to the arts and Dame Commander of the Order of the British Empire (DBE) in the 2021 Birthday Honours for services to art.

Barlow was a member of the juries that selected Doris Salcedo (2016), Pierre Huyghe (2017), Isa Genzken (2019) and Michael Rakowitz (2020) for the Nasher Prize.

== Death ==
Dame Phyllida Barlow died on 12 March 2023, at the age of 78.
