= David Osbaldeston =

British artist and academic (born 1968)

David Osbaldeston (born 1968) is a British visual artist and academic based in the UK. He is currently Reader in Fine Art at the Manchester School of Art and is formerly a lecturer in Painting & Printmaking at Glasgow School of Art.

His work primarily engages with drawing, painting and print to produce a personal method of making he terms 'flat sculpture' and is used to regularly address or satirise power relationships and perceptions of class. By drawing upon elements of his biography he is known for the re-organization of materials, objects and language to form absurdist systems which make abstract connections between perception and reading. He currently lives and works across Manchester, London, and the Scottish Borders.

== Awards ==
He is a 2025/26 recipient of an Abbey Fellowship Award in Painting at The British School at Rome. The Abbey Fellowship In 2025, he received a Pollock Krasner Foundation Artist's Grant Award https://www.pkf.org

== Education ==
He completed his studies at the Rijksakademie Van Beeldende Kunsten, Amsterdam in 2010, and previously attended postgraduate studies in Fine Art at Manchester Metropolitan University and Sheffield Hallam University as an undergraduate.

== Collections ==
- A number of the artist's book works are held at Tate Library https://library.tate.org.uk/client/en_GB/default
- Tate Museum
- British Council Collection
- Whitworth Art Gallery
- Bury Art Gallery
