= Michael Dean (artist) =

British artist

- Born: 1977 (age 48–49); Newcastle, England
- Education: Goldsmiths, University of London

Michael Dean (born 1977) is a British artist. In 2016 he was shortlisted for the Turner Prize.

== Early life and education ==
Michael Dean was born in Newcastle upon Tyne, England, in 1977.

He graduated from Goldsmiths, University of London in 2001 with a BA Fine Art (Studio Practice and Contemporary Critical Theory).

== Art practice and career ==
Dean's work often incorporates materials symbolic of urban renewal and social decline, reflecting personal connections to British working-class communities and the socio-economic history of his native Newcastle upon Tyne. He lives and works in London.

Dean's sculptural work is focused on typefaces.

== Nominations and awards ==
In 2016, Dean was a Turner Prize nominee.

In 2018, he was nominated for the Hepworth Prize for Sculpture.

== Exhibitions ==
Dean's solo exhibitions include Government at Henry Moore Institute (2010), Qualities of Violence at De Appel arts centre, Amsterdam (2015), Sic Glyphs at South London Gallery (2016), Lost True Leaves at the Nasher Sculpture Center in Dallas, Texas, U.S.A. (2016), Tender Tender at Westphalian State Museum of Art and Cultural History, Munster, Stamen Papers at Fondazione Giuliani, Rome (2016), and Lamp black on sack cloth (love for fucksake) at Mendes Wood DM, Paris (2023).
