= Plus Tate =

UK network of visual arts organisations

Plus Tate is a network of visual arts organisations in the United Kingdom, led by the Tate gallery in London.

Plus Tate was launched by Jeremy Hunt MP in 2012, initially with 18 partners. 16 new institutions were added to the network in 2015, increasing the size of the network to 35 members, as announced by Nicholas Serota. As of 2015, Plus Tate member institutions were visited by more than 3.5m people annually, employing around 500 staff, with an annual turnover of around £33 million.
