= The Hepworth Wakefield =

Art museum in Wakefield

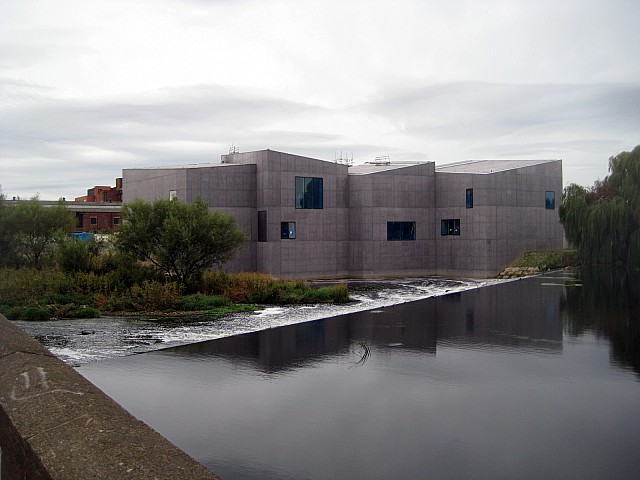
- The Hepworth Wakefield and the River Calder
- Established: 2011
- Location: Wakefield, West Yorkshire, England
- Coordinates: 53.676°N 1.491°W
- Type: Art gallery
- Website: www.hepworthwakefield.org

The Hepworth Wakefield is an art museum in Wakefield, West Yorkshire, England, which opened on 21 May 2011. The gallery is situated on the south side of the River Calder and takes its name from artist and sculptor Barbara Hepworth who was born and educated in the city. It is the successor of (and subsumed) the municipal art collection, founded in 1923 as Wakefield Art Gallery, which spans the Old Masters to the twentieth century.

The gallery was designed by British architect David Chipperfield, who won an architectural design competition managed by RIBA Competitions and was built by Laing O'Rourke with funding from Wakefield Council, Arts Council England and the Heritage Lottery Fund. Yorkshire Forward, the Homes and Communities Agency, and the European Regional Development Fund have also supported the building of the gallery alongside a number of charitable trusts, corporations and private individuals. The Hepworth Wakefield is a registered charity under English law.

The gallery cost £35 million to build. Five weeks after opening it had received 100,000 visitors. In May 2012 it celebrated its first birthday, having received over 500,000 visitors in the year. In October 2015, the gallery launched the £30,000 biennial Hepworth Prize for Sculpture as part of the celebrations marking its 5th anniversary.

== Architecture ==
The Hepworth Wakefield is a structure composed of ten trapezoidal blocks; its upper-level galleries are lit by natural light from large windows in the pitched roofs. Its windows have views of the river, historic waterfront and the city skyline. The building's façade is clad with self-compacting pigmented concrete made on site, the first of its kind in the United Kingdom. The architects selected the material to emphasise the gallery's sculptural appearance. The gallery has ground-floor visitor facilities, including a café bar overlooking the river, a learning studio, a 100-seat auditorium and shop. The building's brutalist design is not universally popular with local people.

== Collection ==
The Hepworth Wakefield's 1,600 square metres (17,000 ft^{2}) of purpose-built gallery space houses 44 plaster and aluminum working models donated by Dame Barbara Hepworth's family and temporary exhibitions of contemporary art. Items from Wakefield's art collection which spans the 16th century to the present day are on display, including works by Henry Moore, who was born in Castleford in the Wakefield district, Ben Nicholson, Graham Sutherland, Paul Nash, Jacob Epstein, Walter Sickert, Anthony Caro, Ivon Hitchens, LS Lowry, and David Hockney.

The gallery is a partner of Plus Tate, a project aimed at increasing public access to the national collection of British and international modern and contemporary art. One acquisition in 2024 was for work by Nour Jaouda.

In 2016 former BBC news writer and art collector Tim Sayer gave his collection of more than 400 works of art to the Hepworth as a bequest in his will. The "Tim Sayer Bequest" includes pieces by David Hockney, Gerhard Richter, Henry Moore, Alexander Calder and Bridget Riley, and has been hailed as one of the most generous of its kind. Sayer was made an MBE in the 2017 Queen's Birthday Honours for services to art and philanthropy.

In 2025, the Hepworth Wakefield – together with the Art Fund – raised the £3.8 million needed to acquire Hepworth’s Sculpture with Colour (Oval Form) Pale Blue and Red (1943); the artwork had previously been sold at a Christie’s auction for £3.5 million but subsequently placed by the UK government under a temporary export bar to give a museum in the country the opportunity to raise the funds necessary acquire it.

== Awards ==
A year after opening, the Hepworth Wakefield was named Regional Building of the Year for 2012 by the Royal Institute of British Architects. The gallery was short-listed for the Art Fund Prize in 2012. In July 2017, the gallery was named the United Kingdom's Museum of the Year.

== See also ==
- Barbara Hepworth Museum
