= Stonesfield Common, Bottoms and Banks =

Protected area in Oxfordshire, England

Coordinates: 51.846°N 1.432°W

- Site of Special Scientific Interest
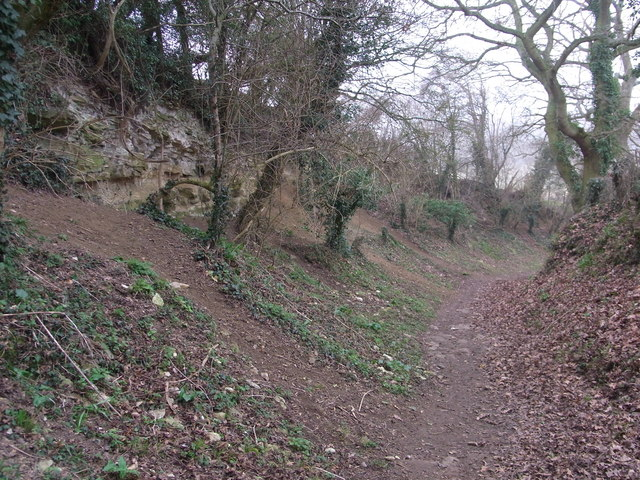
- Location of Stonesfield Common, Bottoms and Banks.
- Area of search: Oxfordshire
- Grid reference: SP 392 165
- Interest: Biological
- Area: 27.45 hectares (67.8 acres)
- Notification date: 1989
- Location map: Magic Map

Stonesfield Common, Bottoms and Banks is a 27.45-hectare (67.8-acre) biological Site of Special Scientific Interest (SSSI) south of Stonesfield in Oxfordshire.

This site is composed of steeply sloping valleys and banks. Most of it is unimproved Oolithic limestone grassland and scrub, but there is also an area of semi-natural beech-wych elm ancient woodland. This area forms one of the largest remnants of such a grassland type in the UK. The five units of Stonesfield Common, Bottoms and Banks SSSI are Church Street, Baggs Bottom, The Common, Stockey Bottom, and the River Evenlode. The site is managed by the Thames Solent area team. The grass in Stonesfield Common is mainly upright brome, and herbs include field scabious, greater knapweed, lady's bedstraw and pyramidal orchid. The main habitats present in the SSSI are broadleaved, mixed and yew woodland lowland, and calcareous grassland. Soils in this site are typically calcareous with stoneless, clayey soils. Fauna in the area includes the small blue butterfly Cupido minimus, colonies of the marbled white Melanargia galathea butterflies, and invertebrate territories such as those of the white-legged damselfly Platycnemis pennipes.
