= Stonesfield =

Village and civil parish in England

Coordinates: 51.851°N 1.429°W

- Village
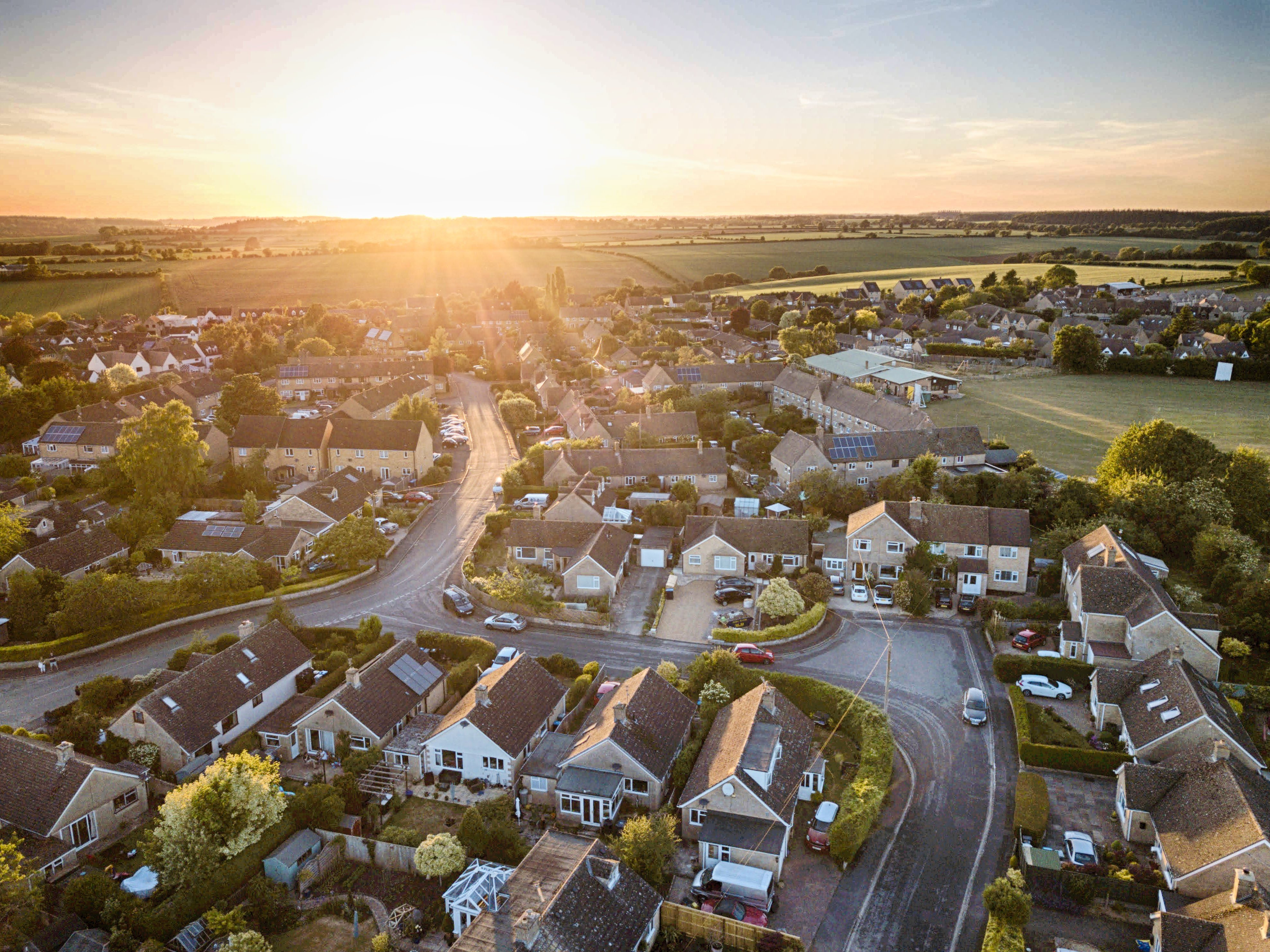
- Aerial view of the village

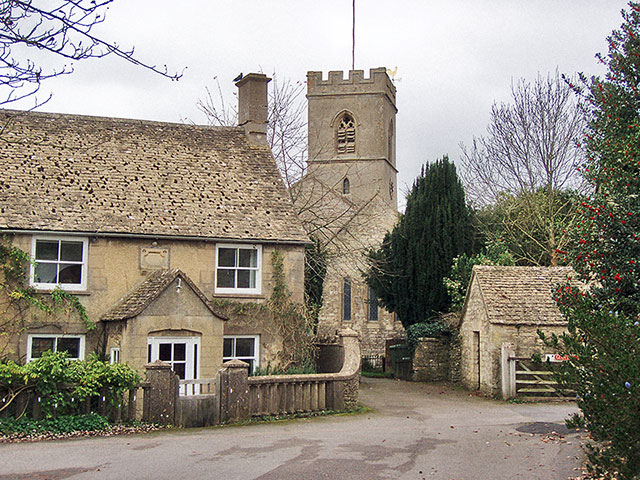
- View of St James the Great parish church from The Cross

- Location within Oxfordshire
- Area: 0.53 km^{2} (0.20 sq mi) (2011 Census)
- Population: 1,527 (2011 Census)
  - Density: 2881
- Area of civil parish: 513.38 sq km (198.22 sq mi) (2011 Census)
- OS grid reference: SP3917
  - London: 60 mi (97 km)
- Civil parish: Stonesfield
- District: West Oxfordshire
- Shire county: Oxfordshire
- Region: South East
- Country: England
- Sovereign state: United Kingdom
- Post town: Witney
- Postcode district: OX29
- Dialling code: 01993
- Police: Thames Valley
- Fire: Oxfordshire
- Ambulance: South Central
- UK Parliament: Bicester and Woodstock
- Website: Stonesfield ~ Oxfordshire

Stonesfield is a village and civil parish about 5 miles (8 km) north of Witney in Oxfordshire, and about 10 miles (17 km) northwest of Oxford. The village is on the crest of an escarpment. The parish extends mostly north and northeast of the village, in which directions the land rises gently and then descends to the River Glyme at Glympton and Wootton about 3 miles (5 km) to the north-east.

South of Stonesfield, below the escarpment, is the River Evenlode which touches the southern edge of the parish. At the centre of Stonesfield stands the 13th-century church of St James the Great as well as a Methodist chapel, Stonesfield Methodist Church, slightly further west.

The village is known for Stonesfield slate, a form of Cotswold stone mined particularly as a roofing stone and also a rich source of fossils. The architecture in Stonesfield features many old Cotswold stone properties roofed with locally mined slate along with some late 20th-century buildings and several properties under construction. The 2011 Census recorded the parish's population as 1,527.

== Name ==
The Domesday Book of 1086 records Stonesfield as Stunsfeld, meaning "fool's field". It was still spelt "Stunsfield" as late as 1712 and Stuntesfield in 1854 before mutating to its present place name under the influence of the fame of the Roman mosaic discovered in one of its fields, its slate quarries, and the dinosaur fossils discovered there.

== Geology ==
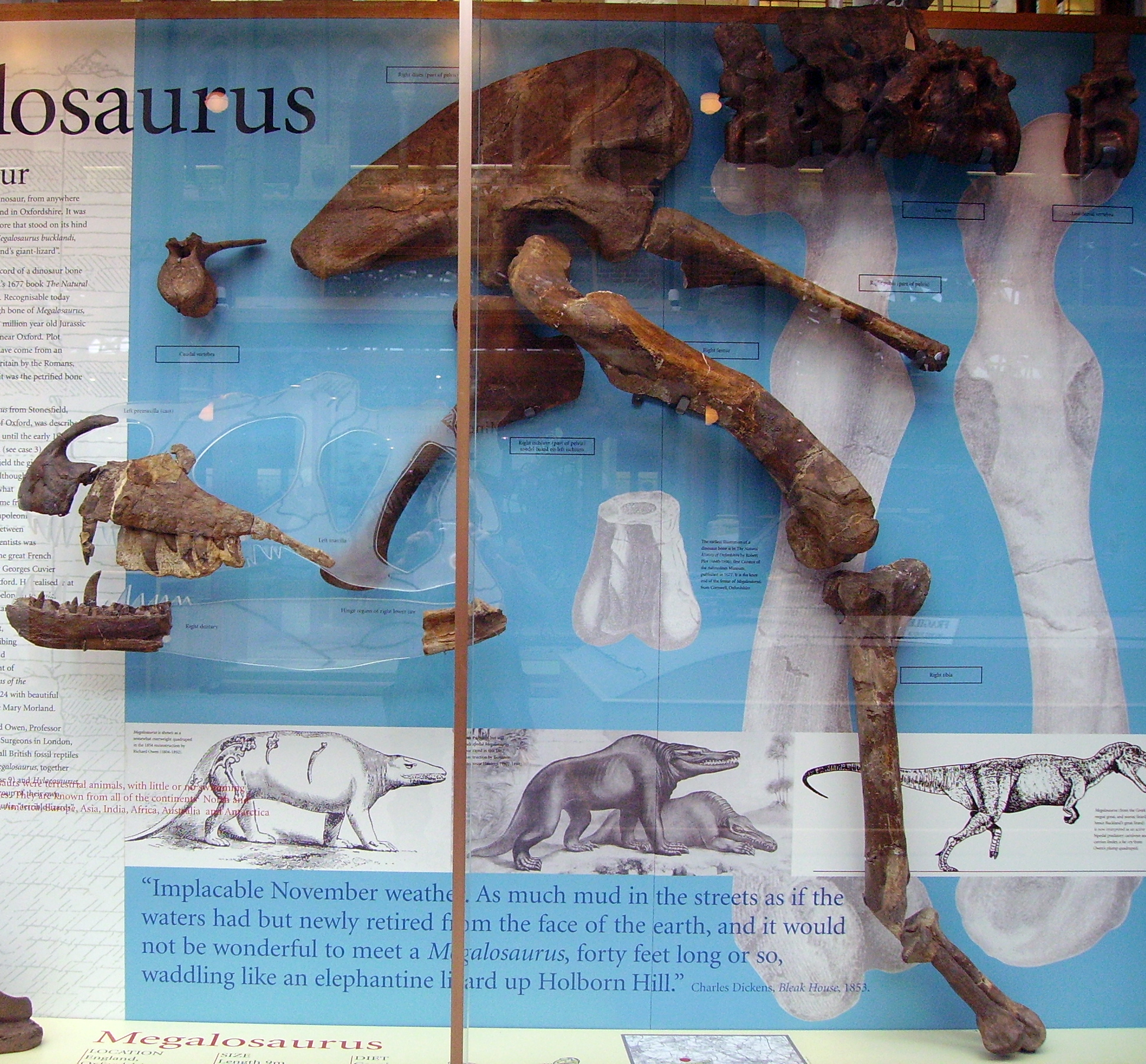
Megalosaurus bucklandii fossils from Stonesfield in the Oxford University Museum of Natural History

Stonesfield is on the Taynton Limestone Formation, a type of Cotswold stone that until the 20th century was mined as a roofing stone called Stonesfield slate. It is common on roofs of older buildings in the Cotswolds and Oxfordshire. Many of the older buildings of the University of Oxford have Stonesfield slate roofs. The quarries were also one of Britain's richest sources of Middle Jurassic vertebrate fossils.

== History ==
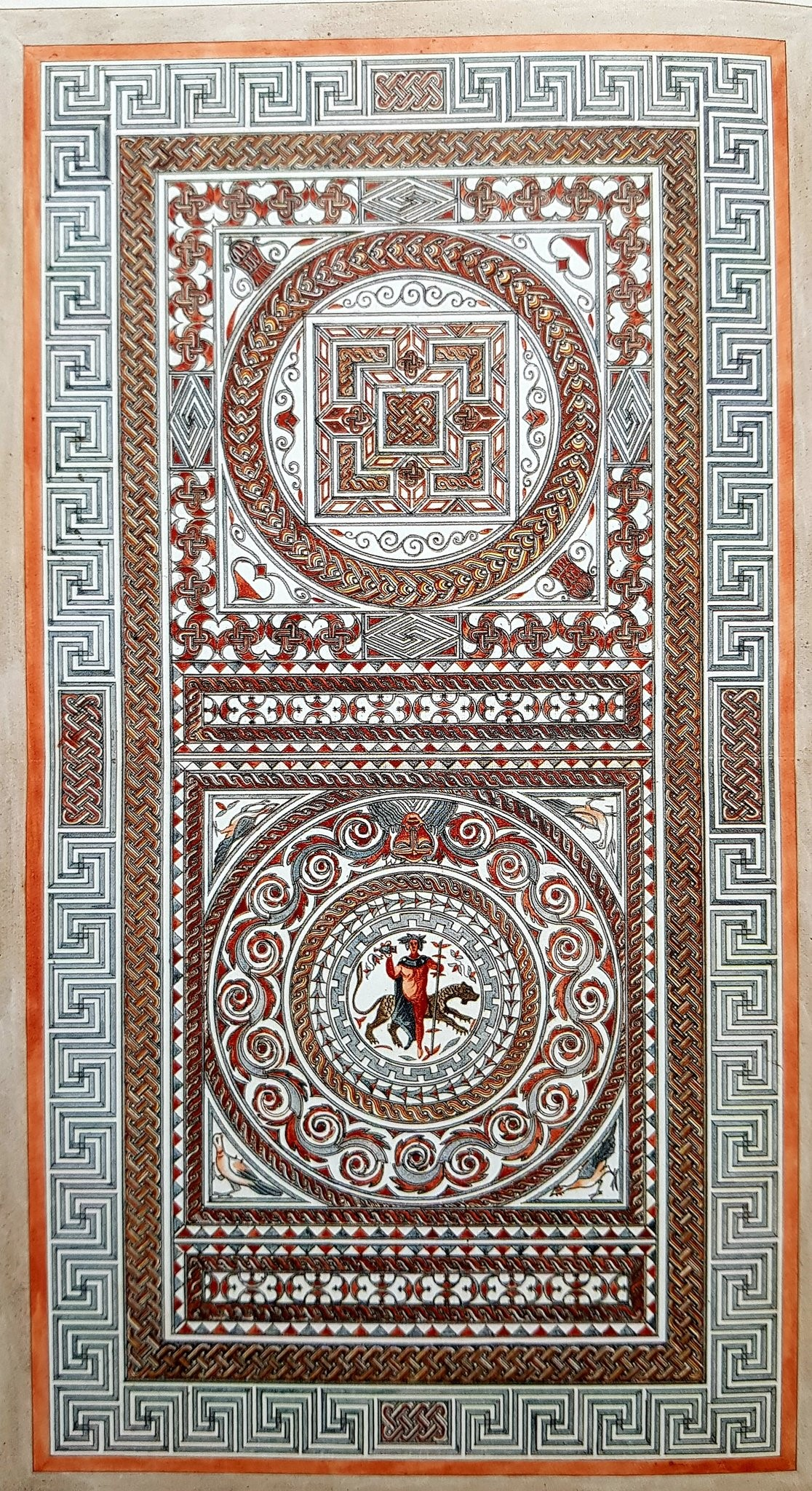
William Lewington's c. 1780 depiction of the Stonesfield Mosaic, now lost

Under Roman rule, a road was constructed from Watling Street just north of the former Catuvellauni capital Verlamion (Roman Verulamium and modern St Albans) to the Dobunni capital Corinium (modern Cirencester), probably incorporating older British trails. Because Fosse Way continued to Aquae Sulis (Bath), known as Aquamannia in the early Middle Ages, this major thoroughfare became known as Akeman Street. The portion of the road passing just southeast of Stonesfield is now preserved as part of the Oxfordshire Way.

Due east of the modern village, a major Roman villa was built just north of the road, probably in the 3rd or 4th century although coins as early as the 1st-century reign of Vespasian were possibly discovered nearby. It has been variously identified as the home of a wealthy Romanized Briton, the estate of an officer of the Romano-British rebel Allectus, and the estate of an officer of Count Theodosius and his imperial dynasty. About 1 mile (1.6 km) south of Stonesfield, on the other side of the River Evenlode and in the next parish, the remains of the North Leigh Roman Villa survive in the care of English Heritage.

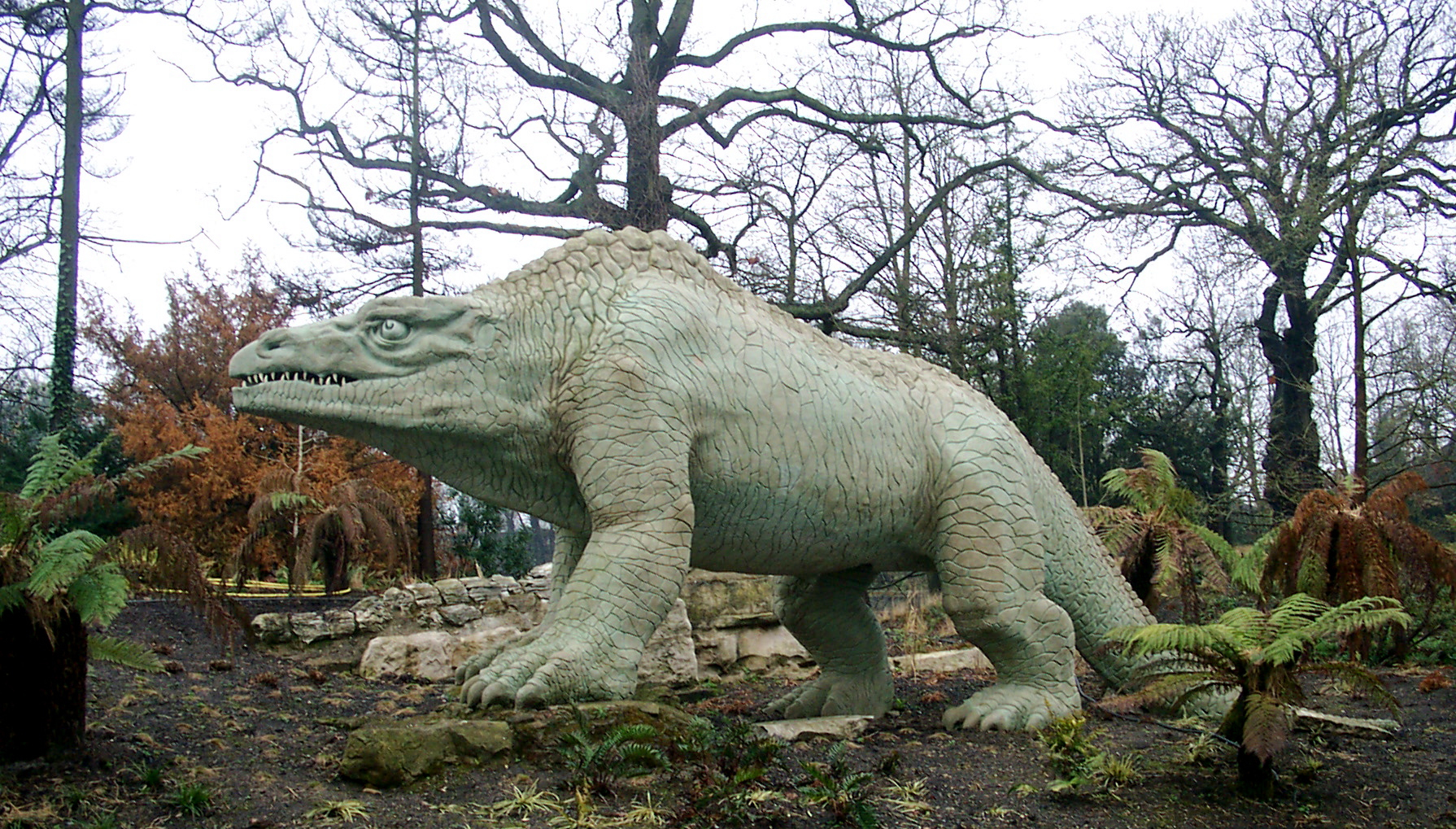
The "Megalosaurus" displayed with the Crystal Palace Dinosaurs in 1854

Lying near Oxford University, Stonesfield's slate quarries produced the first fossils to be formally identified as those of a non-avian dinosaur. A partial femur found in 1676 was published by Robert Plot as belonging to a Roman war elephant and then to a Biblical giant; the specimen was lost but later identified from Plot's illustration and description as belonging to a megalosaur. Other Stonesfield fossils were acquired by the physician Christopher Pegge, the chemist John Kidd, and the geologist William Buckland. With guidance by the French anatomist Georges Cuvier, Buckland eventually realized they came from a bipedal lizard-like carnivore unlike any now living, publishing his description in 1824 with the name Megalosaurus, the "great Fossil Lizard of Stonesfield". The fossils used by Buckland are now displayed at the Oxford University Museum of Natural History. Other species later found at Stonesfield include the crocodile Steneosaurus, the pterosaur Rhamphocephalus, and the type specimens of the theropod genus Iliosuchus and the quadruped Stereognathus. This last species belongs to the cynodont clade, a form of protomammal.

On 25 January 1712, a tenant farmer named George Handes or Hannes rediscovered the old Roman villa while plowing the Chesthill Acre fields. He tricked his landlord, Richard Fowler of Great Barrington, Gloucestershire, into allowing him to dig around his fields before revealing what he had found, leading to a prolonged dispute over ownership and the rights to income from the many visitors who came from Oxford and abroad. Ultimately, three large mosaics were uncovered, the largest of which featured the Roman god Bacchus holding a thyrsus and riding a panther. Oxford academics and their guests destroyed these, removing fragments piecemeal as souvenirs, although Thomas Hearne, Bernard Gardiner, and others created illustrations and descriptions while it was still largely whole and the Ashmolean Museum was able to acquire some hypocaust flue-tiles and the base of a pillar. The antiquaries William Stukeley and Richard Gough blamed the destruction on the tenant's maliciousness and "the mob, who refused to pay for seeing it"; the owners were also accused of salting the site with additional coins from other sources once they saw the profit from their original discoveries. The site was neglected after the initial interest waned; however, as late as 1780 the antiquarian Daines Barrington reported that the mosaic found in 1712 survived "in tolerable preservation". Around that time, a second excavation took place, revealing a smaller room and parts of the villa's baths. The careless enclosure of Stonefield's common lands in 1801 caused the site of the Roman villa to be divided among 3 different owners, who seem to have quickly removed the last of the known ruins. By 1806, Gough's new edition of William Camden's Britannia reported it "destroyed, except some of the borders... and part of the corners"; James Brewer's 1813 Beauties of England and Wales noted that even the relics on the Duke of Marlborough's new land had not been preserved; and John Yonge Akerman found it "totally destroyed" by 1858. Despite George Allen's interest in aerial archaeology around Oxfordshire, he never bothered to photograph the site.

== Church and chapels ==
=== Church of England ===
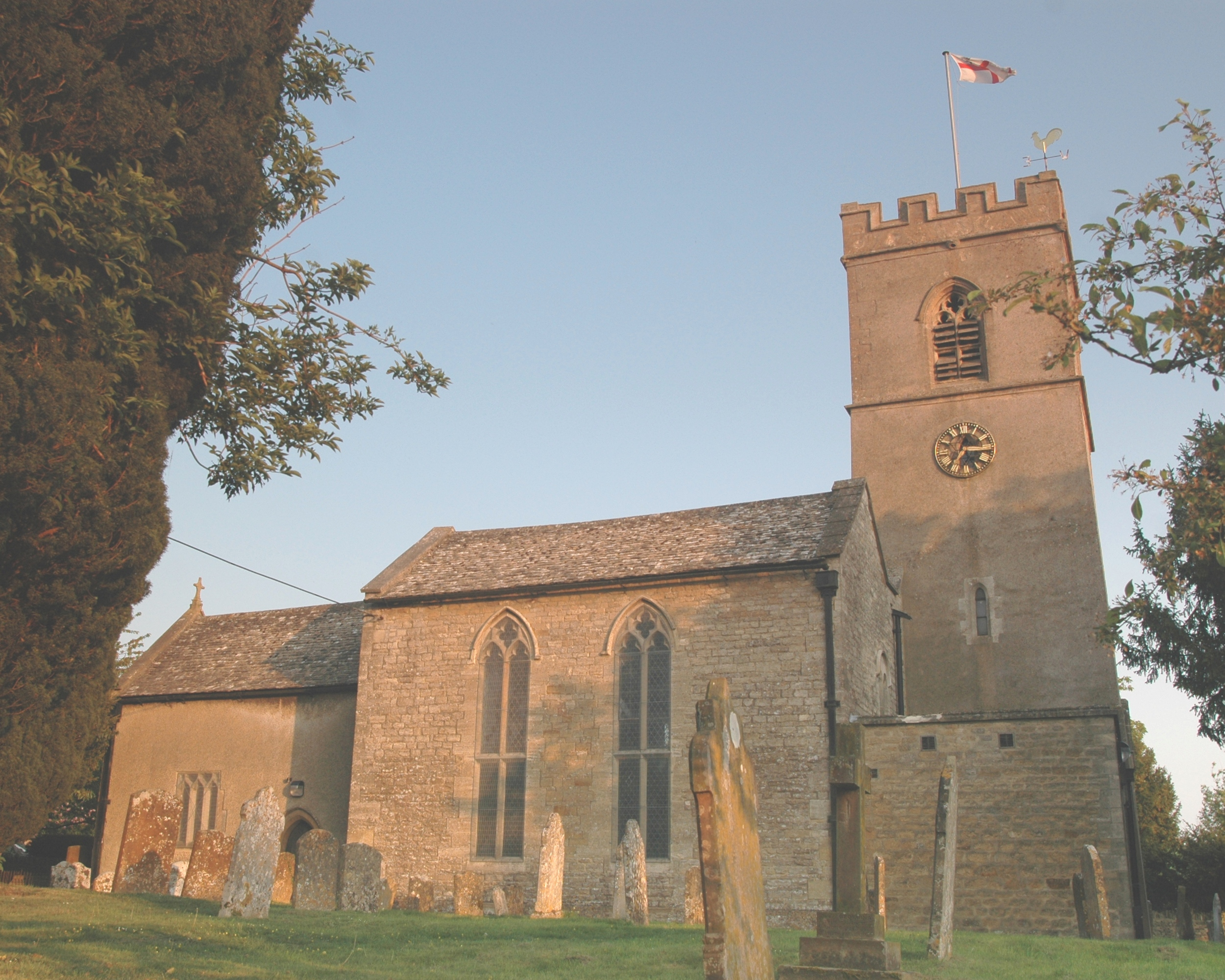
North side of St James the Great Church

The Church of England parish church of St James the Great was built in the 13th century. Surviving Early English features from that period include the chancel arch, north chapel, south aisle, arcade and piscina and most of the west tower. Decorated Gothic remodelling in the 14th century includes the piscina and south windows of the chancel, the north window and west arch of the north chapel and the east window of the south aisle. The octagonal font is also 14th-century. In the 15th century the west tower was increased in height.

Between the chancel and north chapel is a screen that is partly Perpendicular Gothic. The Perpendicular Gothic east window in the chancel is 15th-century. Fragments of 15th-century stained glass survive in the window, including a figure that has a 14th-century head and may represent Saint Peter, and symbols of the evangelists St John and St Mark. In the west window of the west tower is late-15th-century stained glass of four family coats of arms. In one of the south windows of the chancel is 16th-century stained glass of two coats of arms: one of a manorial family and the other of the Worshipful Company of Mercers. There is also mid-16th-century stained glass of two family coats of arms in one of the 17th-century south windows of the clerestory. The Jacobean pulpit was made in 1629.

In 1743 a clock was installed in the church. It was said to have been made for a local manor house in 1543, and transferred to the church after the house was demolished. The clock has since been moved from Stonesfield, rebuilt, and installed at Judd's Garage at Wootton. In 1825 the north aisle was greatly enlarged, opening directly into the nave without an arcade. This greatly changed the interior of the church, and in the 20th century the architectural historians Jennifer Sherwood and Sir Nikolaus Pevsner condemned the change as "lunatic". Other 19th-century changes include the addition of the south porch, possibly during a restoration in 1876. The vestry was added in 1956. The church is a Grade II* listed building St James' parish is now part of the Benefice of Stonesfield with Combe Longa.

=== Methodist ===
Stonesfield Methodist Church is a Wesleyan chapel with capacity for 100 people, located at the junction of Boot Street and High Street.

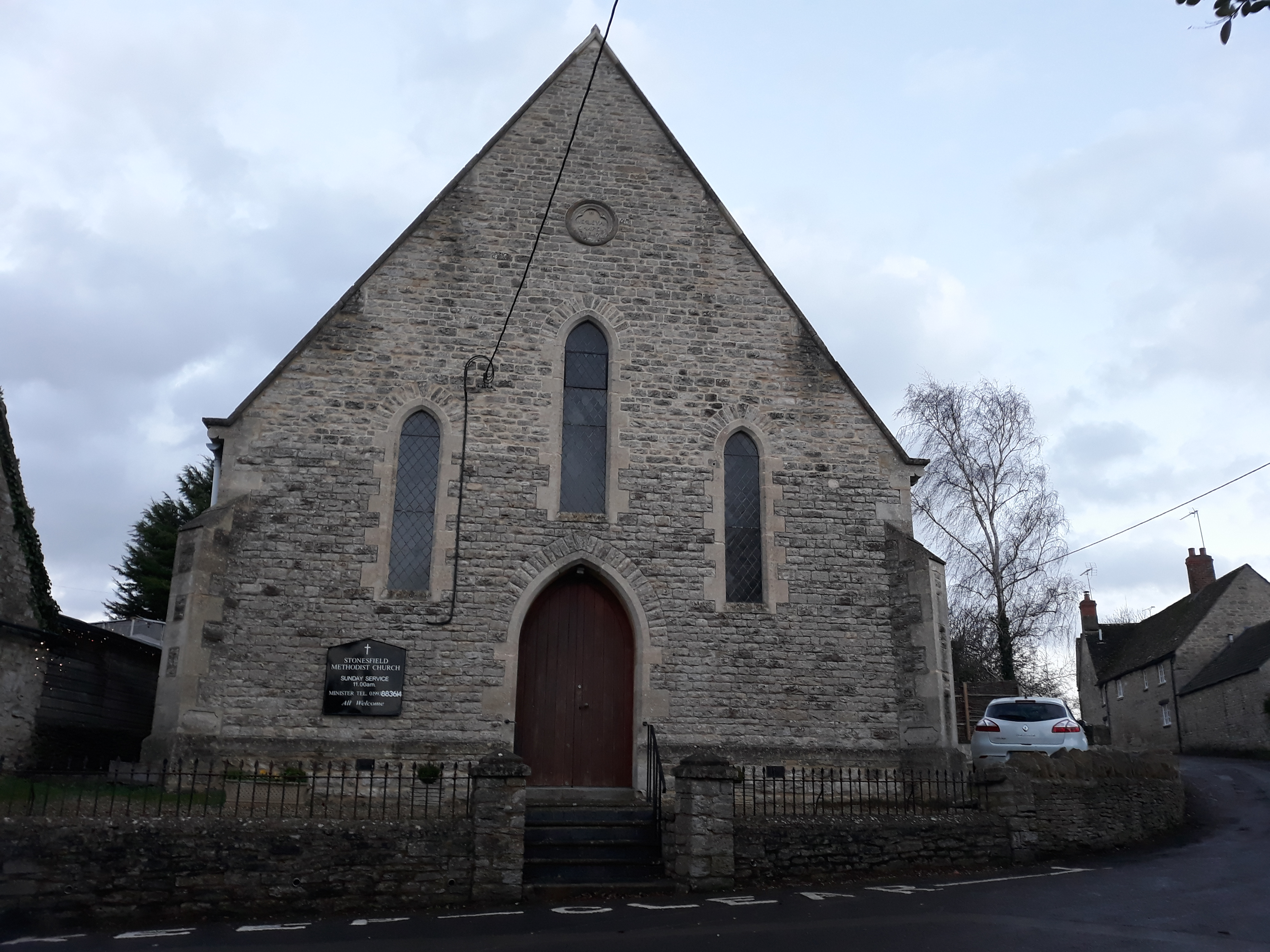
Wesleyan chapel built in 1867

The current church was first opened for worship in July 1867 and still remains in use today. The current Reverend is Rev Rose Westwood, Witney and Farringdon Circuit Superintendent and Minister for Long Hanborough, Charlbury, Stonesfield, and Sutton Churches.

The church contains a four and a half octave single keyboard organ with foot pedals and seven stops. It bears two plaques recording two last members who helped arrange for its purchase and installation; both plaques are dedicated to the Glory of God 30 April 1966.

== Economic and social history ==
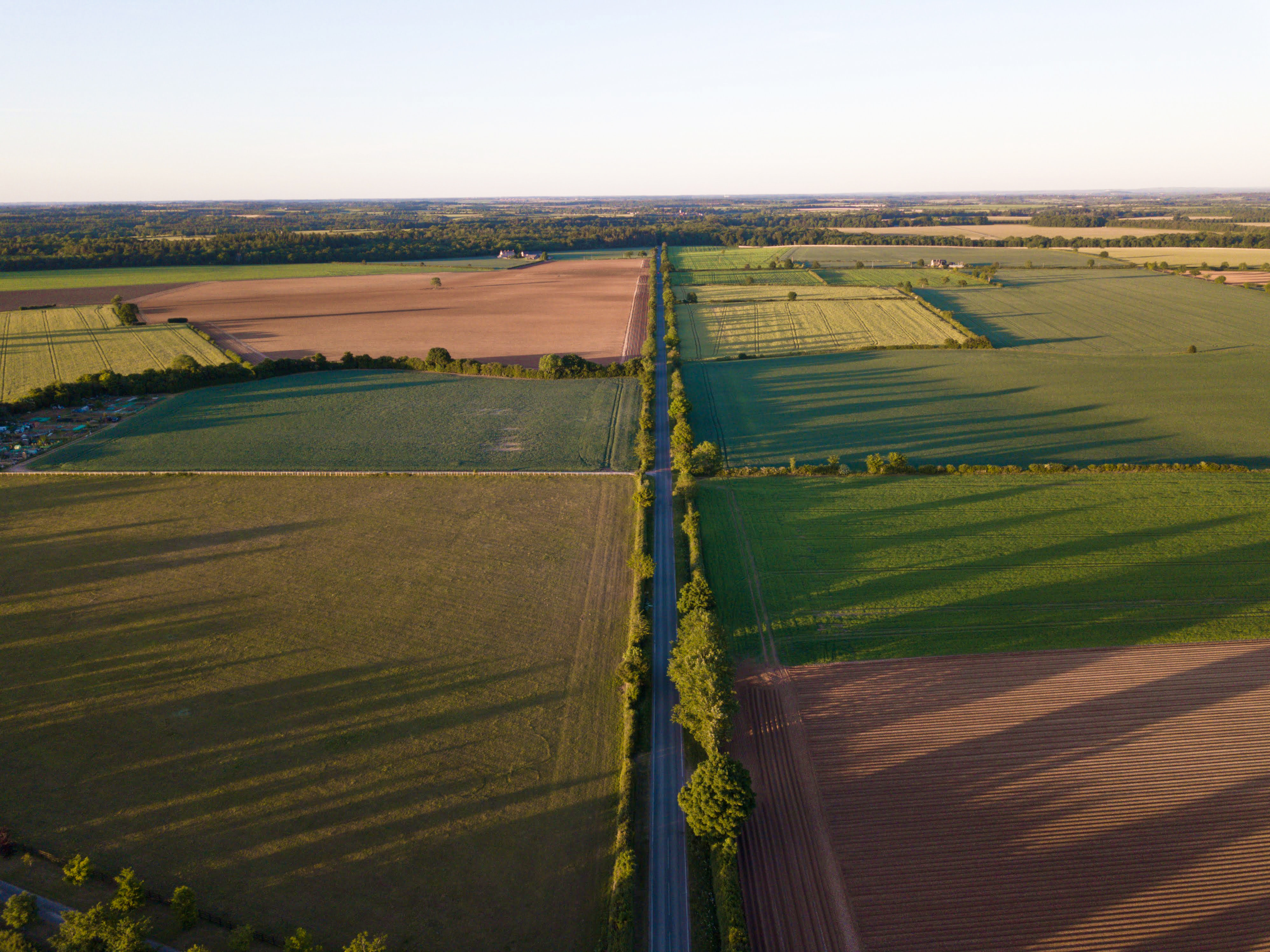
Stonesfield Road and surrounding fields including Home Field (left)

For centuries the parish had one main open field for arable farming: Home Field, which was east of the village. Three others, Church Field, Callowe, and Jenner's Sarts, were much smaller, and an early 17th-century survey records that not every farmer had strips in Church Field. In 1232 the parish almost doubled in size by acquiring King's Wood, a nearby detached part of Bloxham parish. It was in this wood that people from Stonesfield created Callowe by clearing woodland, a process called assarting. By the time of the Hundred Rolls in the 1270s, every tenant in Stonesfield held assarted land.

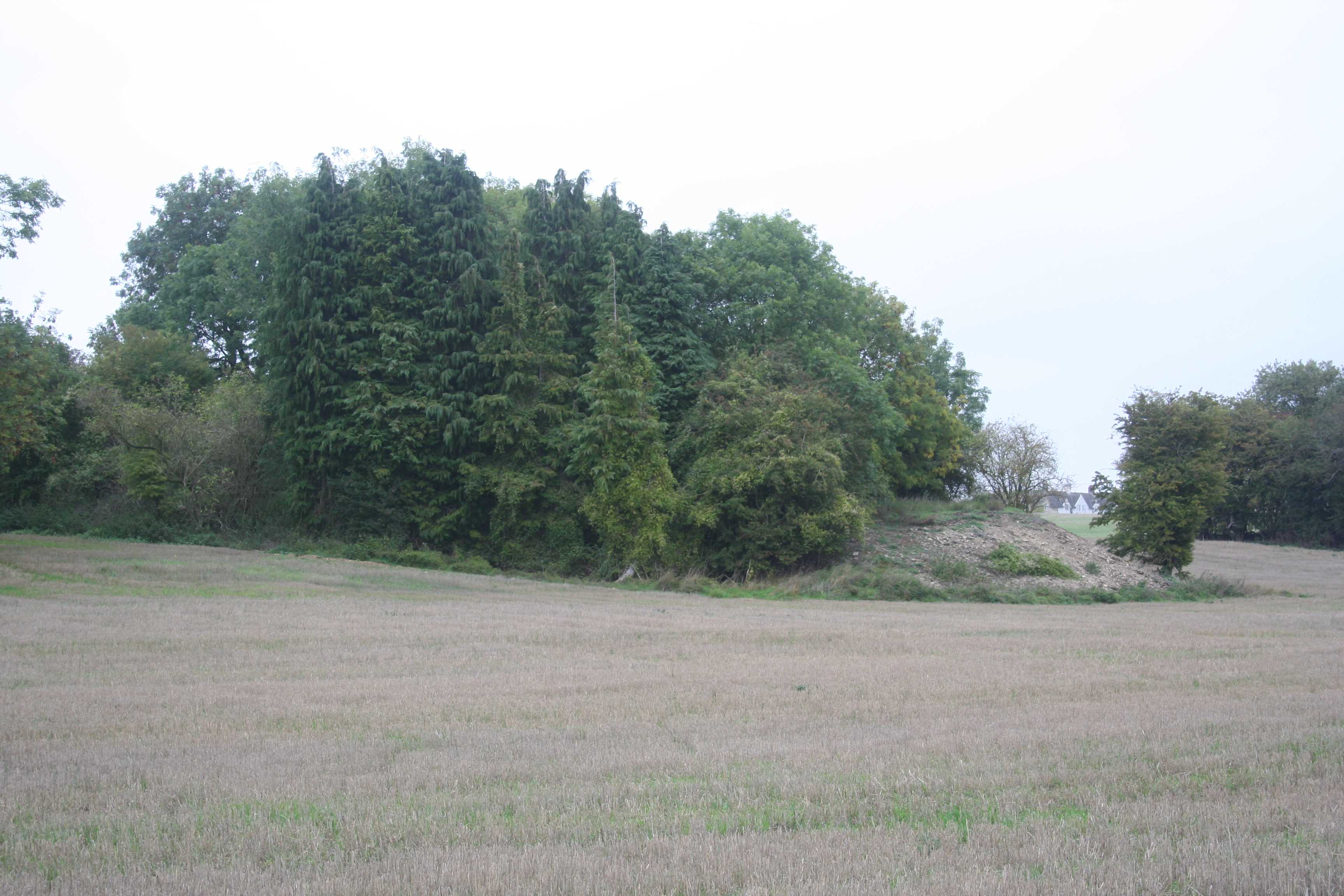
A spoil mound from former Stonesfield slate mining

By the first decade of the 17th century Stonesfield had at least four fields. Church Field is taken to be ancient like Home Field, but Jenner's Sarts was created by felling in Gerner's Wood. It is not clear whether this field is the same as that called Gannett's Sarte in another source. By 1792 very little of Stonesfield's common land had been enclosed, and most of it was still worked by arable strip farming. By 1797 most of this had been enclosed and converted to pasture. Some common land remained in the parts of the parish closest to the village, but this was enclosed in a land award of 1804.

== Amenities ==
=== Public houses ===
Over the years Stonesfield has had between seven and ten pubs; however, since 2010 only one has remained open.

==== The White Horse ====
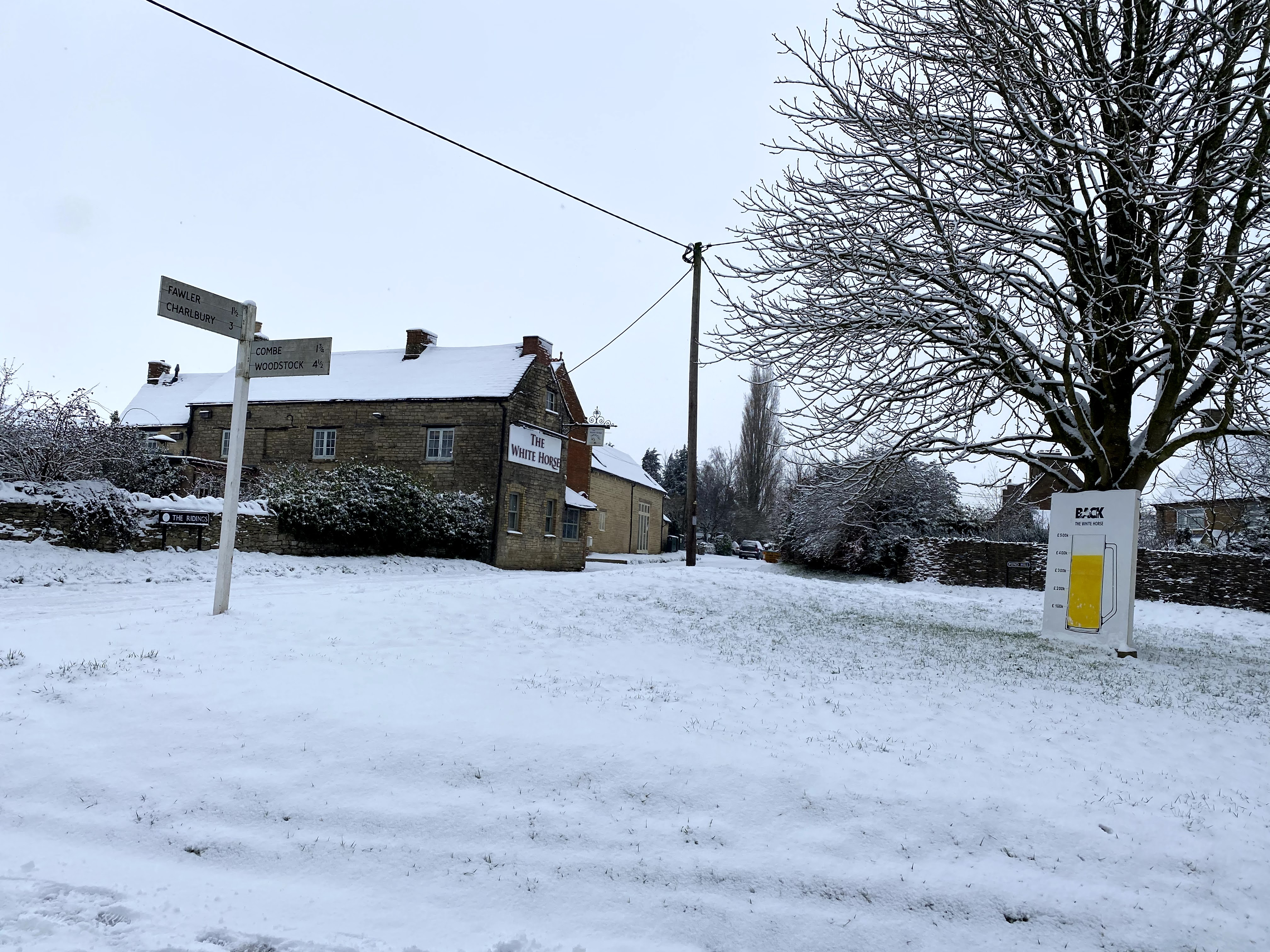
The White Horse in January 2021 with a fundraising board outside showing amount of money raised for Back The White Horse

The White Horse, Stonesfield's final pub, is at the top of the village green on The Ridings. The pub has served the community since its opening in 1876, despite an extended period of closure between 2020 and 2023. Previously called the White Lion, from 1847 its licensee was John Lardner, who lived in one of the three cottages making up the pub's buildings. Following John's death in September 1865 the licence was transferred to his son, Henry Lardner, in October 1865. This was the first mention of the name 'White Horse'. The White Horse was sold at auction after it was advertised on 28 October 1876.

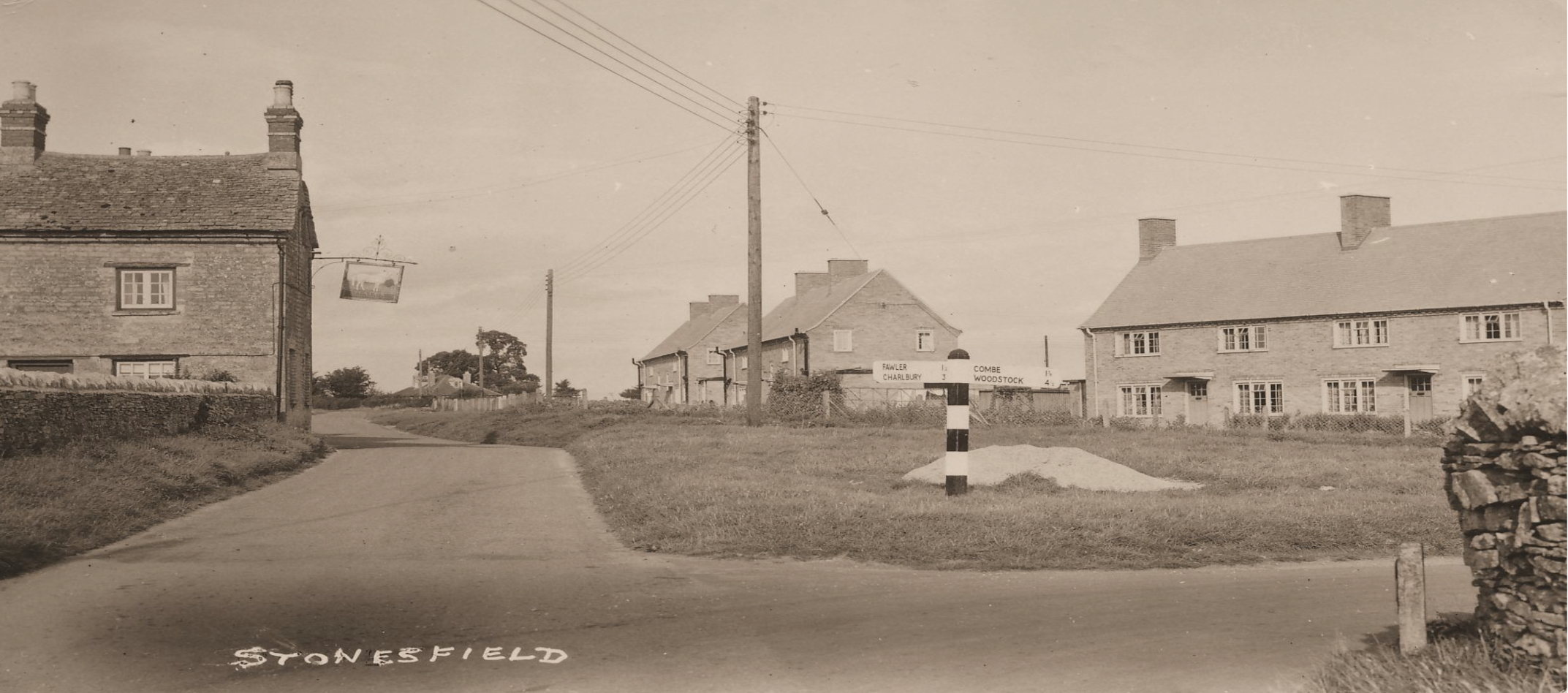
The Ridings in the 1940s, showing The White Horse on the left

The listing had the description:

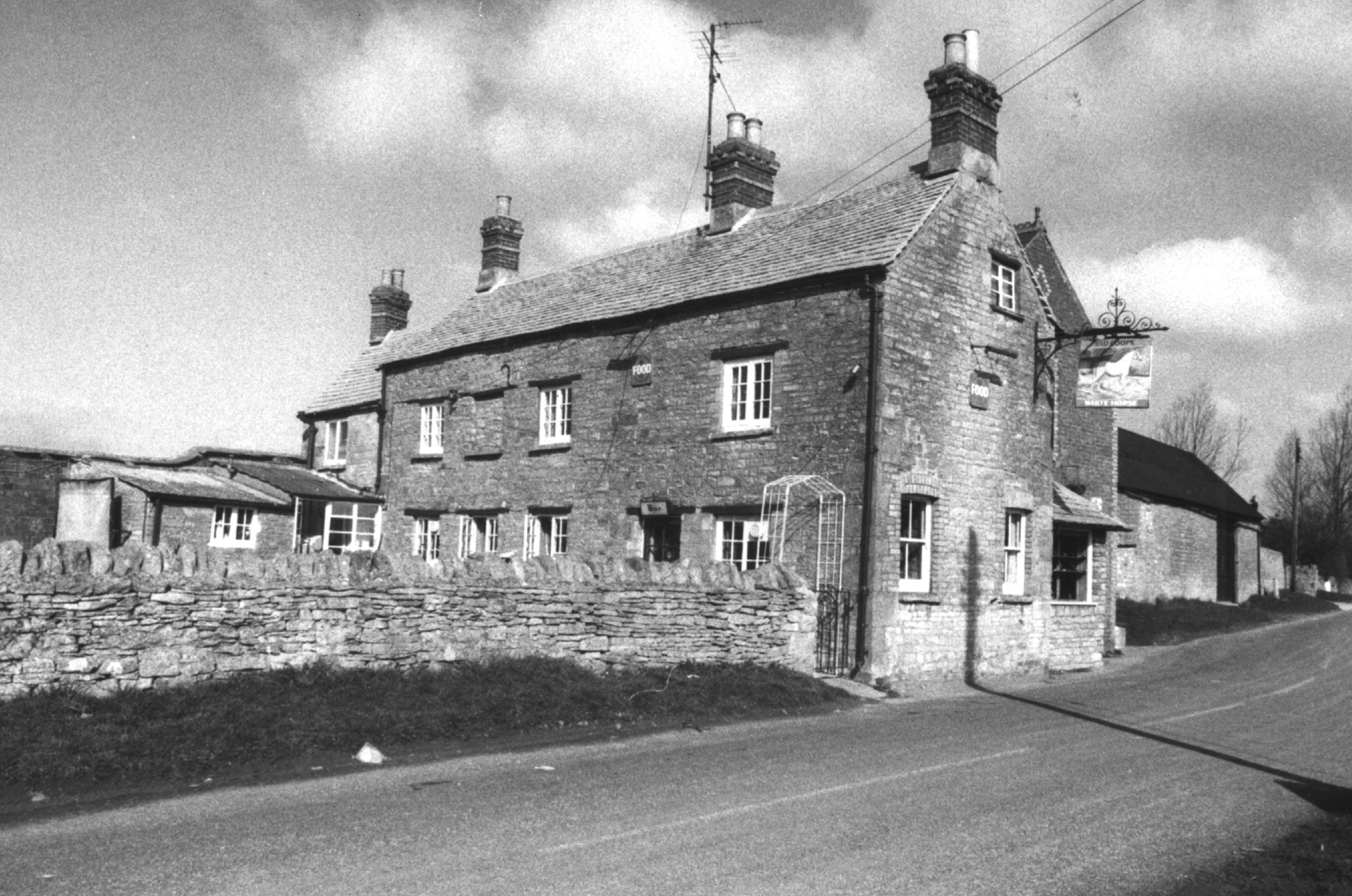
The White Horse in March 1980

'A stone-built and slated free public house, called or known by the name of "The White Horse," situate in the village of Stonesfield, and containing 2 front rooms, tap room, pantry, scullery, cellar 3 bed rooms, and 1 attic; together with the 2 Cottages adjoining (but unoccupied). Detached are a Brew-house, large Shop with extensive cellarage underneath, Stable, Barn, Wagon Hovel, Cow Shed, Poultry Pen, Piggery, and Cattle Yard; together with capital Garden Ground at the back and in the front of the house.
The Outgoings are Quit Rents amounting to 1s. yearly.'

From 1876 to 1907 various landlords took on the role of running the pub until the licence was passed on to the Oliver family. The family ran it from 1907 under Edward Oliver until 1962 under Minnie Oliver. The Witney Gazette referenced Vivian and Emily Miles' retirement from the pub's ownership in June 1977. During the 1980s Nigel Bishop ran the White Horse. During this period, much like Sturdy's Castle on the Banbury Road (A4260) and the King's Head in the centre of Woodstock, the White Horse Inn became a 'Spud Pub'. After a period of closure between 2001 and 2005, it was bought by a Londoner called Richard Starowki. He restored the pub and reopened it in 2006. Three years later, in 2009, John Lloyd bought the pub from Starowki.

During the March 2020 COVID-19 lockdown in England, the pub was forced to close. The owner, John Lloyd, listed it for sale that July. Local residents formed a community benefit society to attempt to raise money to save the pub via a shared ownership concept. £430,000 was eventually raised. Despite this, a private sale took place in early 2021. The new owner said he planned to reopen the pub; however, concerns arose from his background as a property developer. The pub was bought by the community in 2023 and reopened as a pop-up pub. The pub was then closed for repair and refurbishment in January 2024, with a plan to fully reopen later in the year. On 1 June 2024, Craig Tipper and his business partner Barbara took over tenancy over the pub, with the aim of creating “a proper pub that’s accessible to everyone”. On Friday 14 June 2024, The White Horse was fully reopened as a community-owned pub, with a new website and menu.

==== The Black Head ====
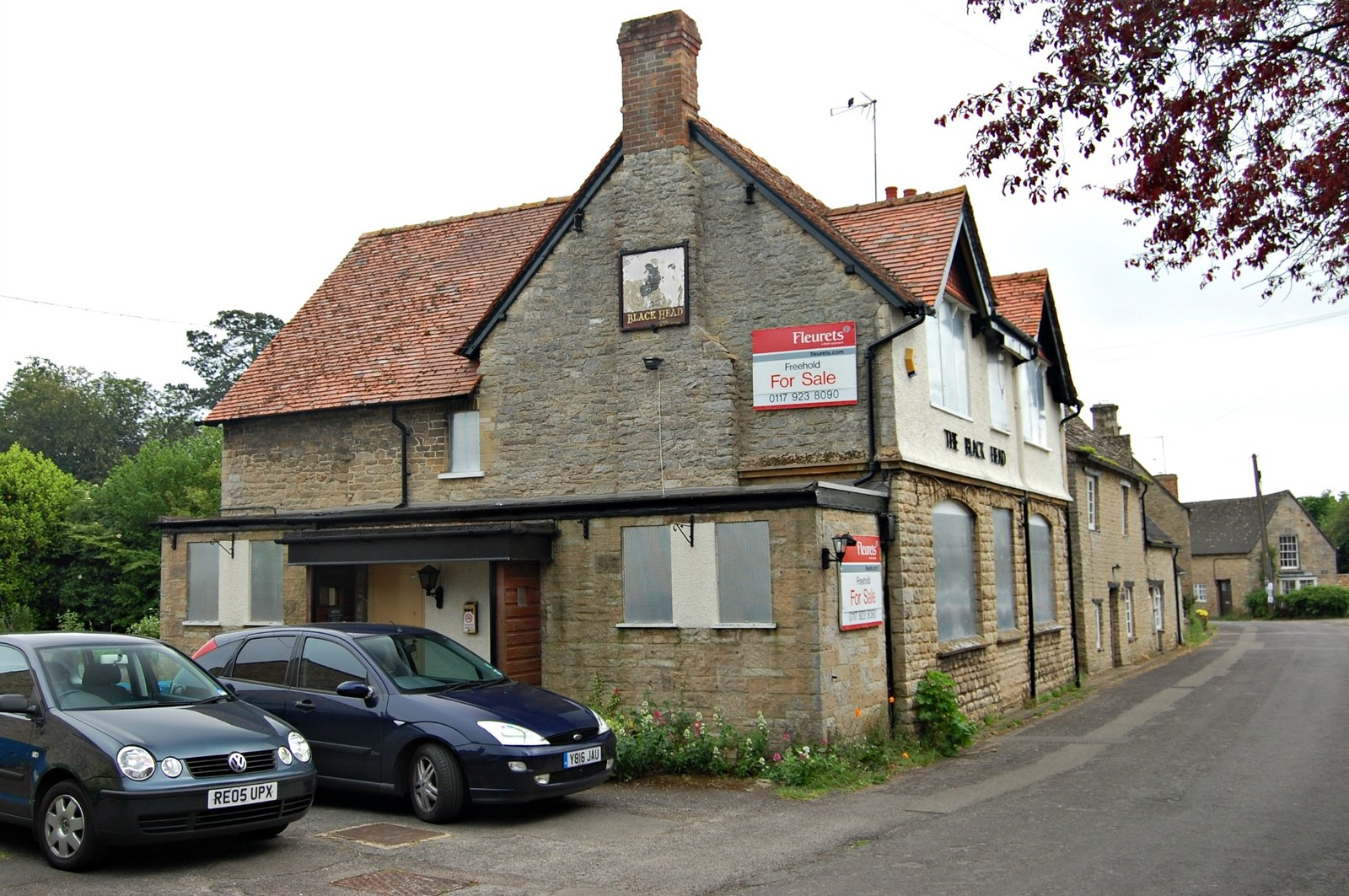
The Black Head for sale in 2012

Originally named The Black Boy, The Black Head was a pub on Church Street. The pub burnt down in around 1850 during the ownership of Thomas Stewart. This was the cause of the name change to The Black Head when it was rebuilt soon afterwards, the name sticking until the pub ceased trading in 2010. During the 21st century the pub was owned by the Nomura Bank of Japan, owner of the Wellington Pub Company. Its latest owner applied in 2012 and 2014 for planning permission to turn the Black Head into a private house. The building is now a private residence.

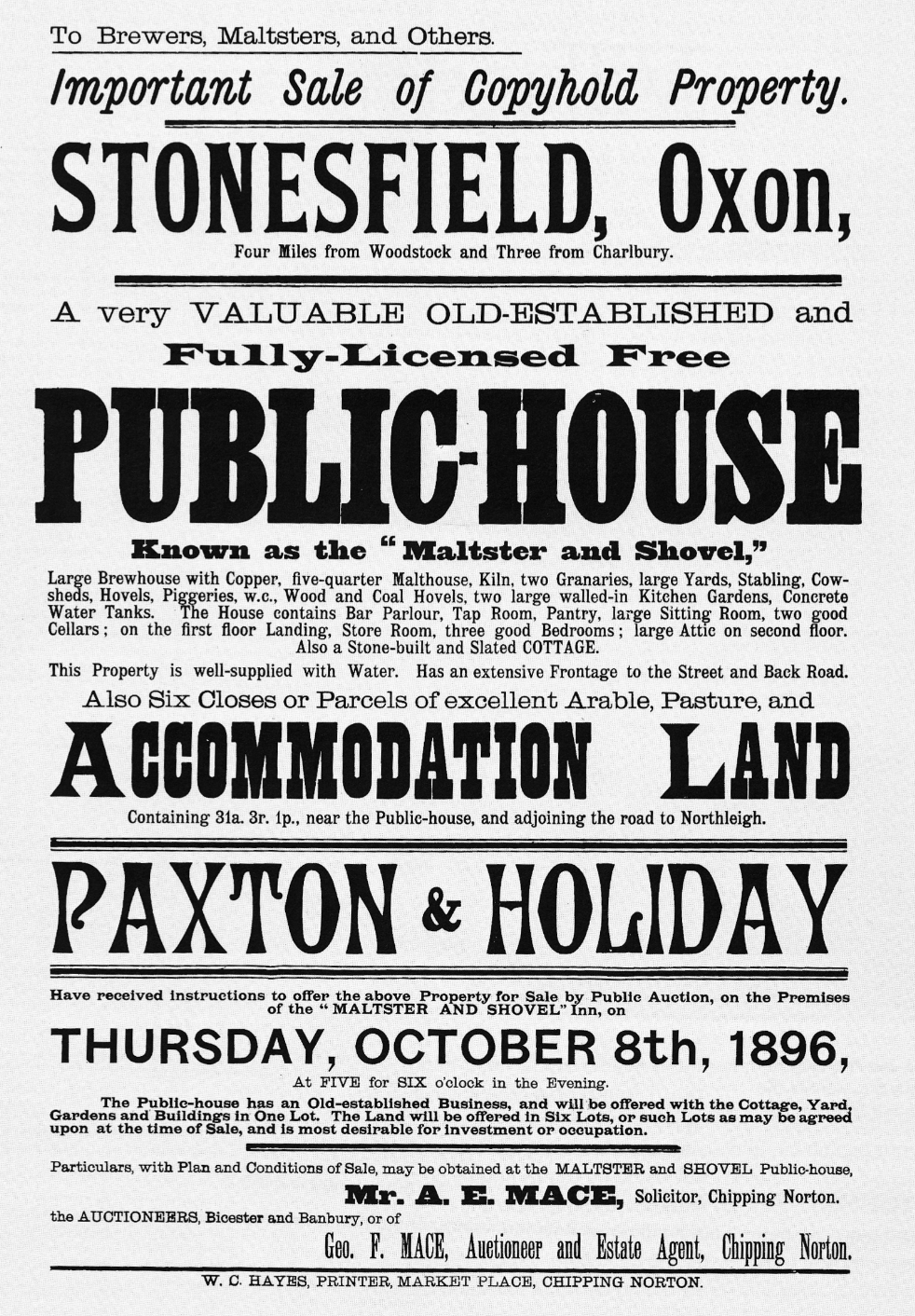
Advert for the sale by public auction of Maltster and Shovel

==== The Chequers ====
The Chequers is another pub in the village that is now a private residence. It was on the south of Laughton's Hill and was allegedly a popular pub with entertainers travelling through Stonesfield. The Chequers was open from 1753 until 1847.

==== The Maltster and Shovel ====
The Maltster & Shovel, on High Street, was open from 1831 to 1939 and is now also a private residence.

==== The Marlborough Arms ====
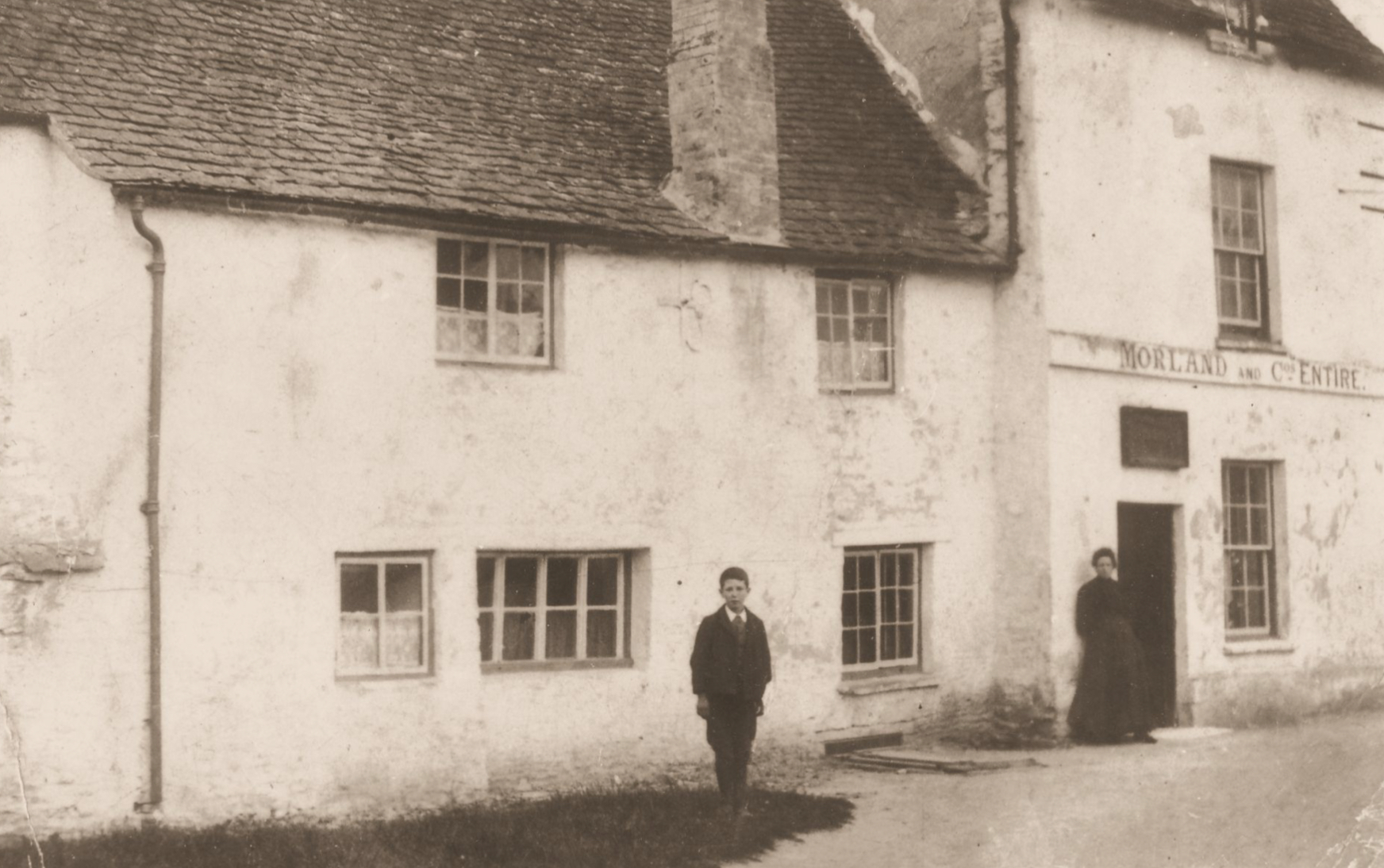
Bert Bishop and the landlady, Esther Bishop, in front of the Rose & Crown in 1911

A public house which now forms part of Prospect Villa, The Marlborough Arms, opened on the Woodstock Road in 1838 and served customers until 1875.

==== The Rose and Crown ====
The Rose & Crown also previously stood on the High Street; however, it was demolished in 1958 to make way for a new school playground and, 34 years later, five low-cost houses were built there.

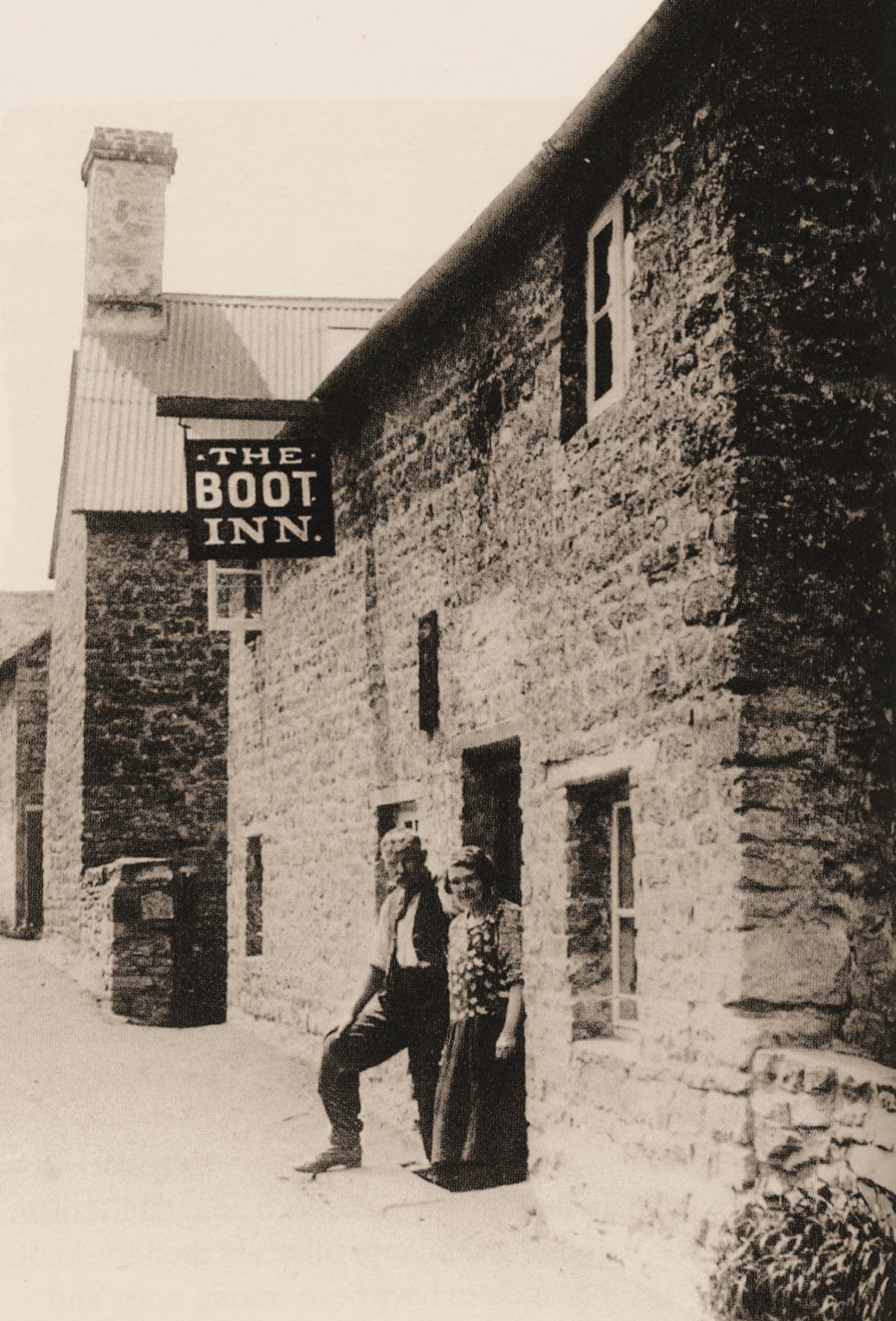
Frederick and Ellen Griffin in front of the Boot Inn in the 1940s

==== The Swan Inn ====
The Swan Inn is thought to have been up the Tewer and served from around 1865 until 1877, although evidence is limited especially compared to the other Stonesfield pubs.

==== The Churchill Arms ====
The Churchill Arms is another public house with limited information regarding its details. The Oxford Journal mentioned the pub in 1826 and 1828 regarding the auction of an 'estate at Stonesfield'.

==== The Boot Inn ====
The Boot Inn was also among Stonesfield's previous pubs. Mr Vivian Miles and his wife, Emily, ran the pub from 1952 until 1962 before taking ownership of the White Horse Inn up the road for a further 15 years.

==== The Pick and Hammer ====
The Pick and Hammer pub is said to have been at the bottom of Well Lane. Records are also limited in regard to this pub; however, the cottage gained notoriety in the 1990s from a police incident involving a search for the body of a murdered woman. Michael Morton, a millionaire and architect by trade, was jailed for seven years in 1997 following his conviction for the murder of Gracia, his 40-year-old wife.

=== Other amenities ===
==== Village hall and Stonesfield Sports and Social Club ====
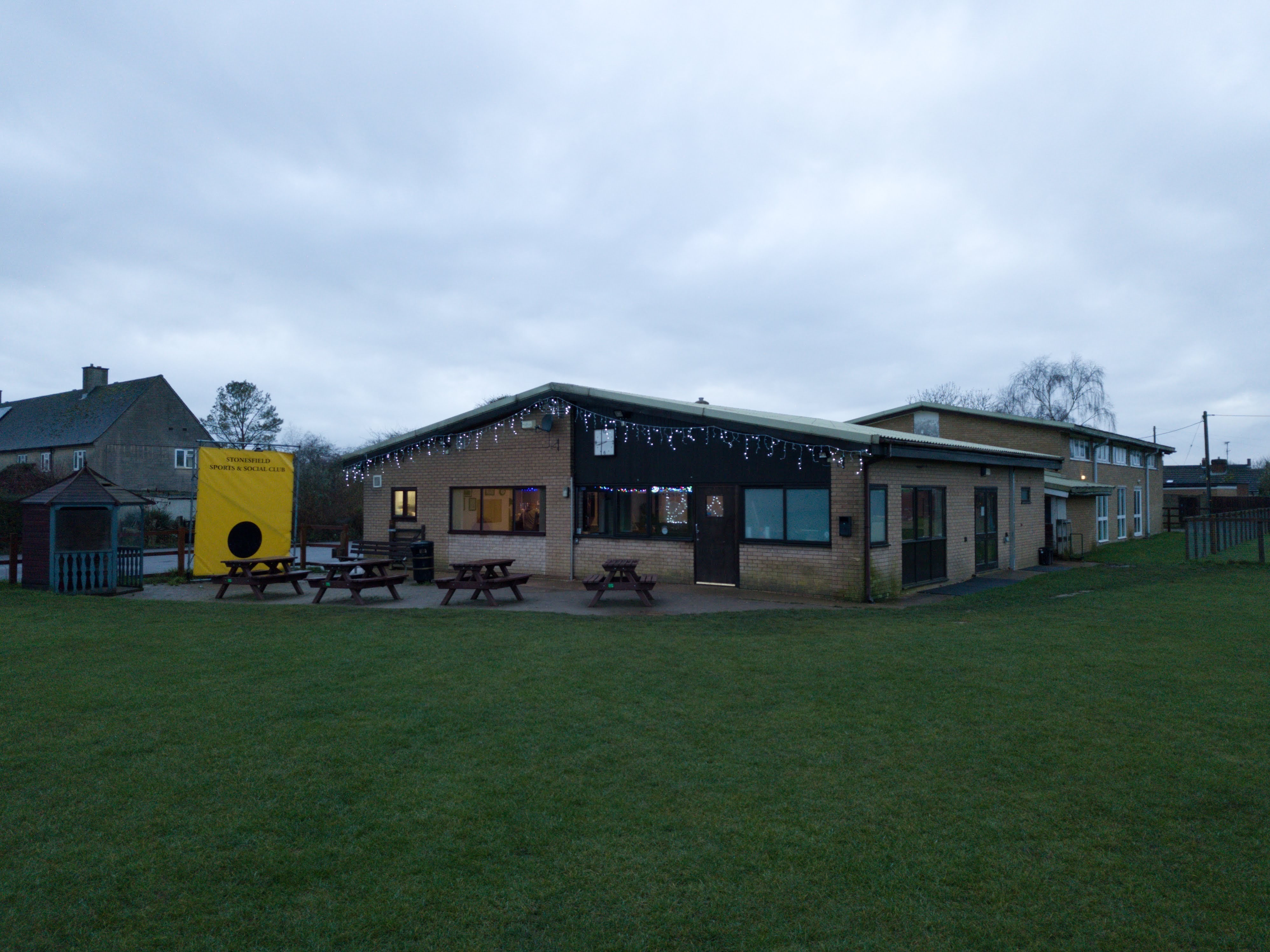
Back of Stonesfield Village Hall, showing the Sports & Social Club extension and outdoor area

Stonesfield Village Hall is at the end of Field Close, next to the library, play park, and football pitch. Stonesfield Sports & Social Club opened on 23 July 1995 after 10 years of fundraising £65,000 for an extension to the village hall. The Main Hall can accommodate up to 200 people. The community hall contains a stage, small 50-capacity club room, kitchen and has a car-parking area outside. Stonesfield Parish Council meetings are regularly held at the village hall. The library next door, Stonesfield Library, is a small community library run by Oxfordshire County Council and supported by the Friends of Stonesfield Library (FoSL).

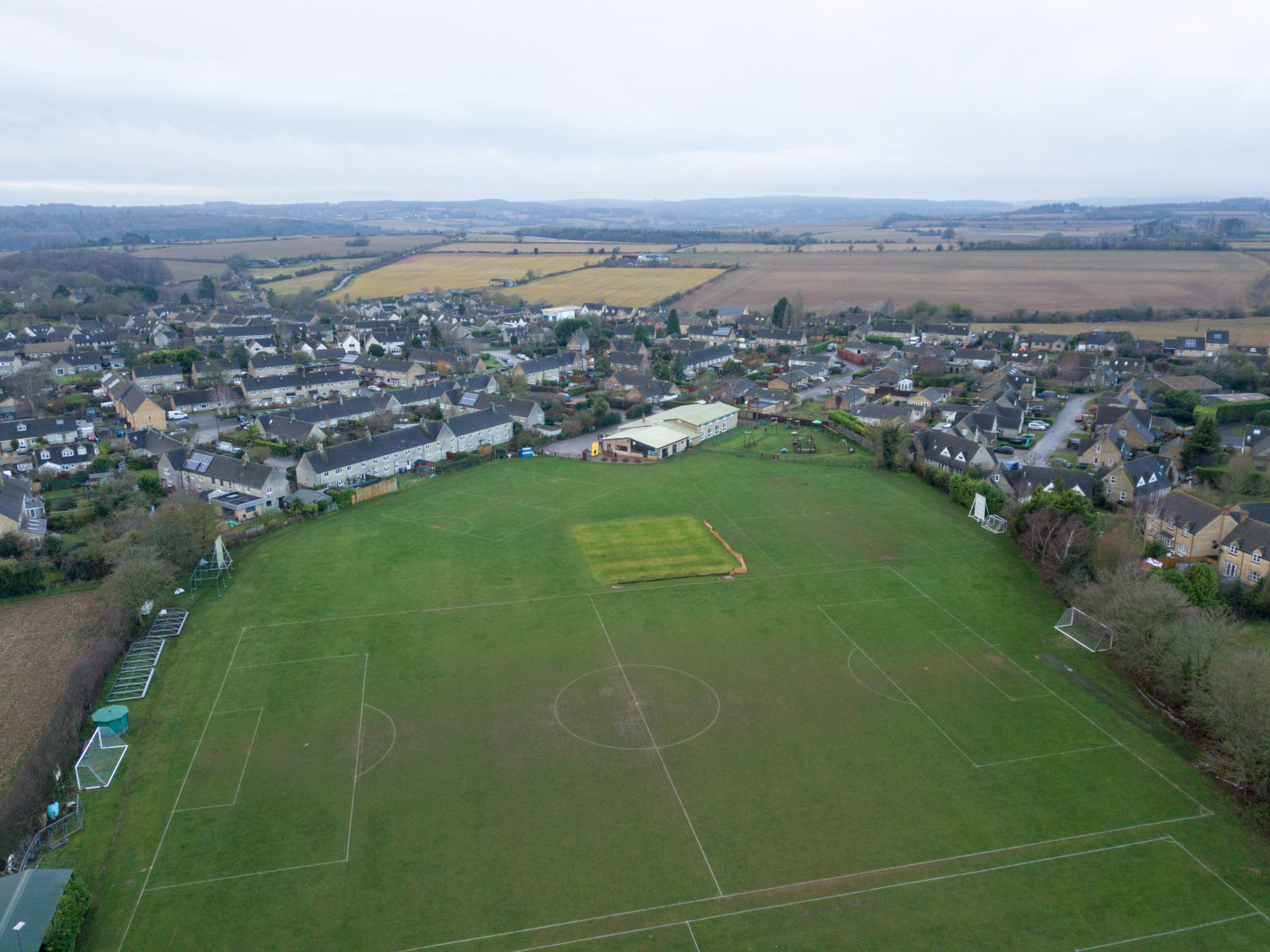
Aerial view of Stonesfield's sports pitch, playground, and village hall

==== Sports pitch and playground ====
The adjacent 7-acre (2.8 ha) sports pitch accommodates cricket and football matches as well as three tennis courts in the far north corner. This is the home ground of Stonesfield Strikers F.C., a youth football club with a number of mixed-sex and girls-only teams. The club is FA Charter Standard and is affiliated with Oxfordshire FA, boasting teams in all local leagues. They also fundraise for the Mickey Lewis Memorial Fund in memory of the club mentor and coach.

There is also a small playground, Stonesfield Play Park, next to the library and sports pitch. The playground is fully grassed and has equipment such as three slides, five swings, and a zip line on a small mound.

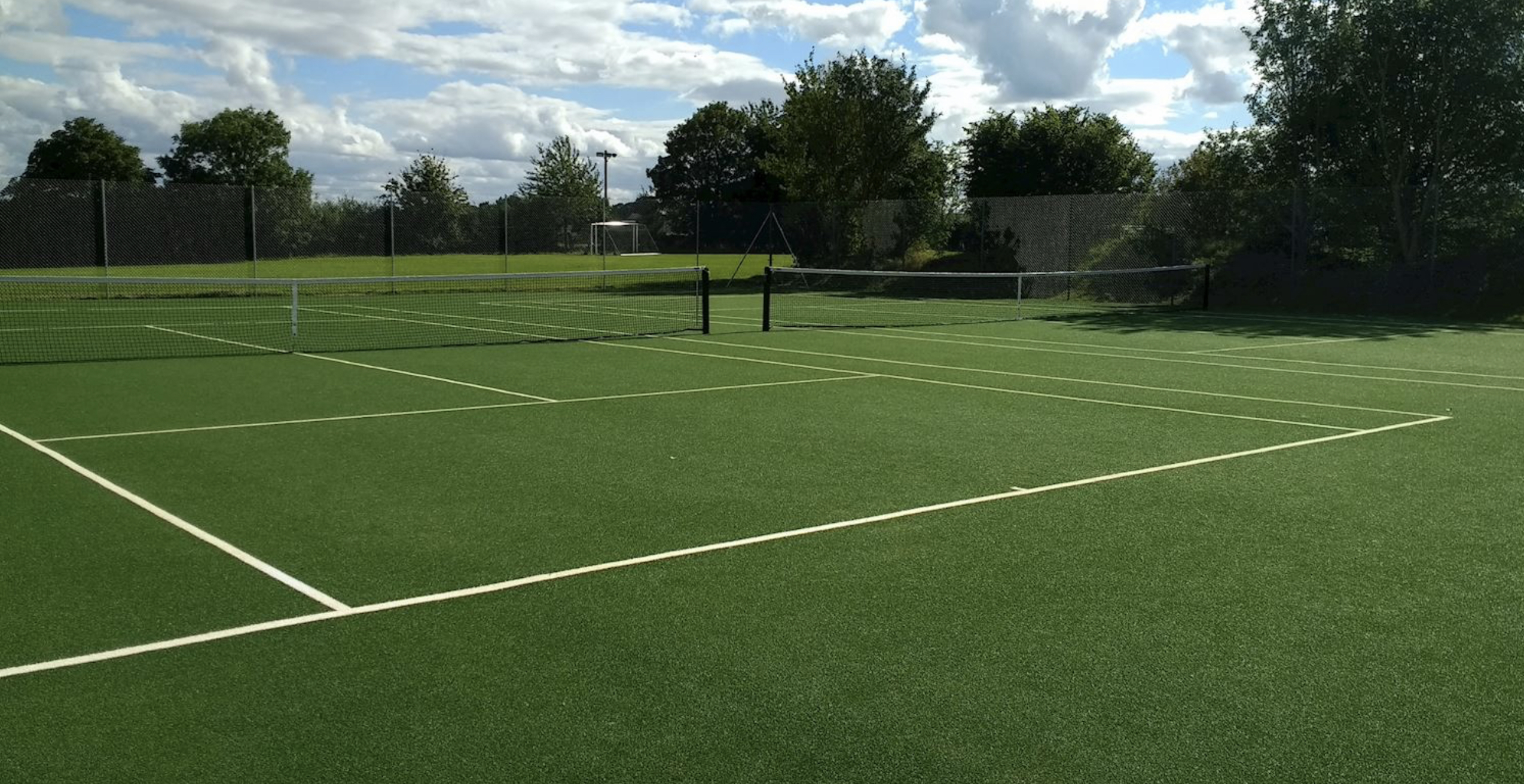
Stonesfield's tennis courts

Stonesfield Tennis Club is a community tennis club which was established more than 50 years ago. The club's relatively small, friendly group of members play on the aforementioned tennis courts on the sports pitch, which were re-laid in 2018.

Stonesfield Cricket Club, also known as Stonesfield CC, are a community cricket club which play on Stonesfield's sports field each season. The club has a 1st XI, 2nd XI, under 15, under 13, and indoor team. Stonesfield CC beat East & West Hendred in 2005 to win the Telegraph Cup. The 2nd XI also won the Keith Crump Centenary Cup by beating Hook Norton 2nd XI in 2007's final.

==== Village shop ====
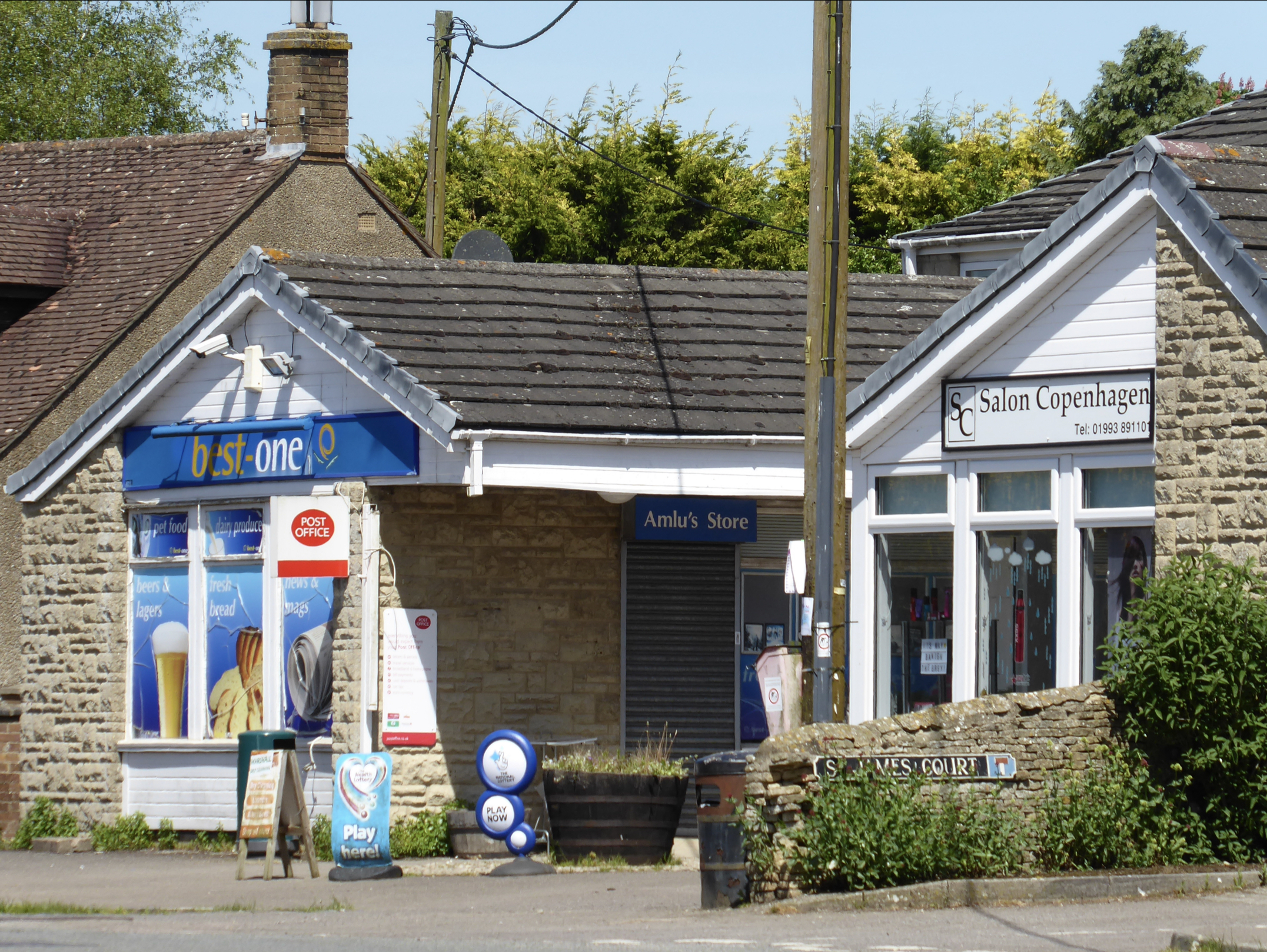
Pendle Court showing Amlu's General Store (left) and Salon Copenhagen (right)

Stonesfield's village shop, Suriya Express, is located in Pendle Court in the centre of the village and is a Best-one store. It was previously known as Amlu's General Store, from the Tamil word ‘Amlu’, meaning ‘darling’. The shop was run by Sri Vairamuthu and his family for over ten years before they moved to London. During this time the shop was voted best Oxfordshire village shop in 2006. The shop is now run by Mathon Sabapathy and his wife. The shop now contains a Royal Mail post office following its move from next to St James the Great Church. Adjacent to the shop is a hairdresser called Salon Copenhagen.

==== Primary school ====
Stonesfield Primary School is a community primary school located in the centre of the village on the High Street. It caters for pupils age 4 to 11 from the ward of Stonesfield and Tackley and has capacity for 150 students. Its current headteacher is Ben Tevail and there are currently over 100 students. The approximately 68,000 square feet (6,300 m^{2}) sports field and playground behind the school, backing onto Peaks Lane, form an iconic part of the village.

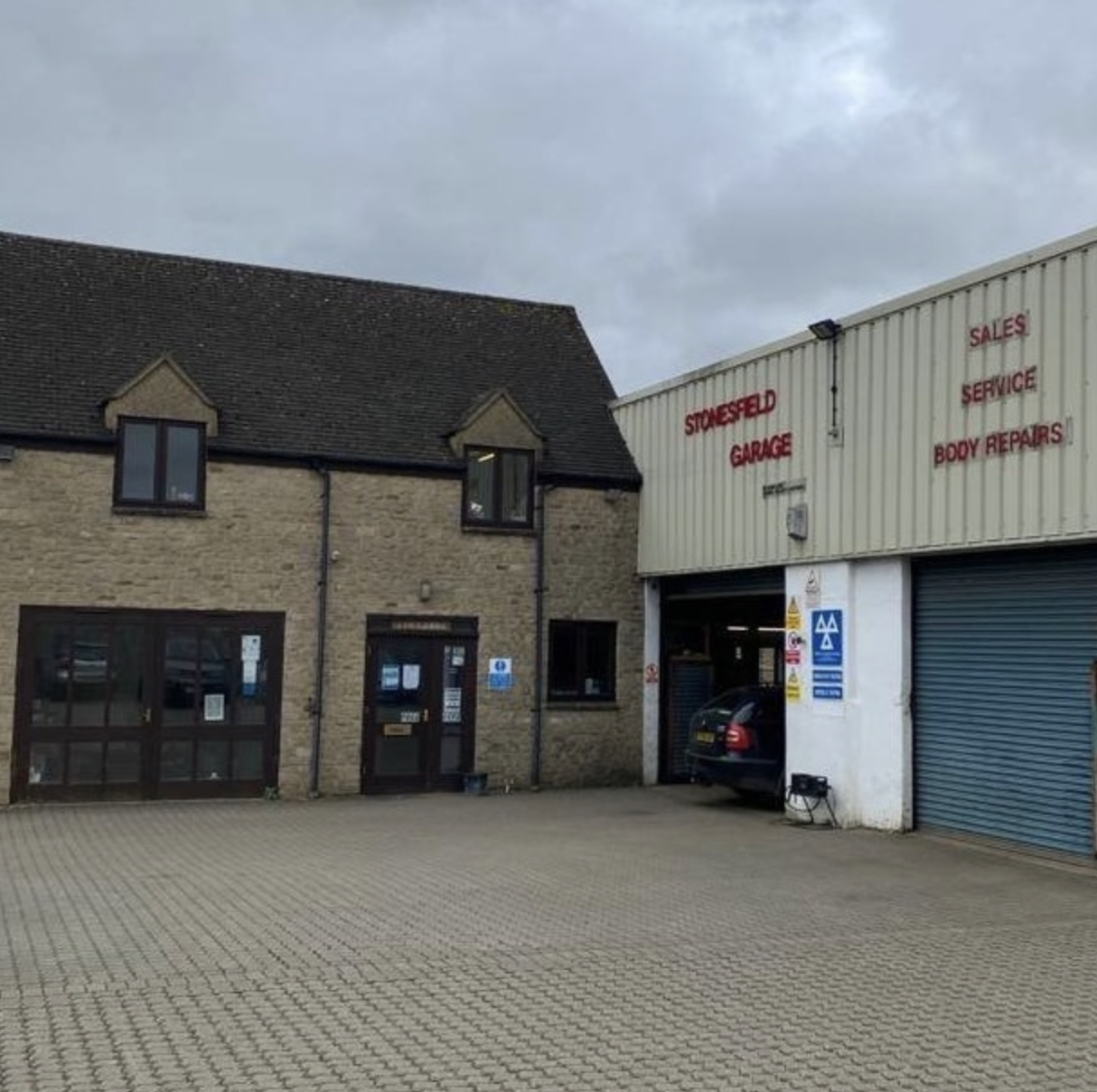
Entrance to Stonesfield garage showing the forecourt and office

==== St James’ Centre ====
Found on the High Street opposite Stonesfield Primary School and behind St James the Great Church, The St James’ Centre, previously the village school, is used for exhibitions, workshops, education classes for adults, meetings, family gatherings, fundraising events and children's parties. The centre belongs to Stonesfield Parish Church and sits on the edge of the church's grounds. The modernised centre includes a main hall, kitchen, sitting room, patio, 3 smaller rooms, garden, and a car park.

==== Allotments ====
Stonesfield Allotment Association, chaired by Jon Gordon, controls the allotments within the village. Churchfield Allotment is an allotment in the south of Stonesfield extending down into Stonesfield Common. The allotment's plot is about 473 feet (144 m) in length by 95 feet (29 m) in width. Having raised over £3000, in February 2019 the allotment holders helped to instal the infrastructure needed for four new water troughs to be installed to supply the allotment with fresh water via the Thames Water network. The second, slightly smaller allotment plot is the Woodstock Road site located in the north east reaches of Stonesfield, surrounded by fields.

==== 1st Stonesfield Scouts ====
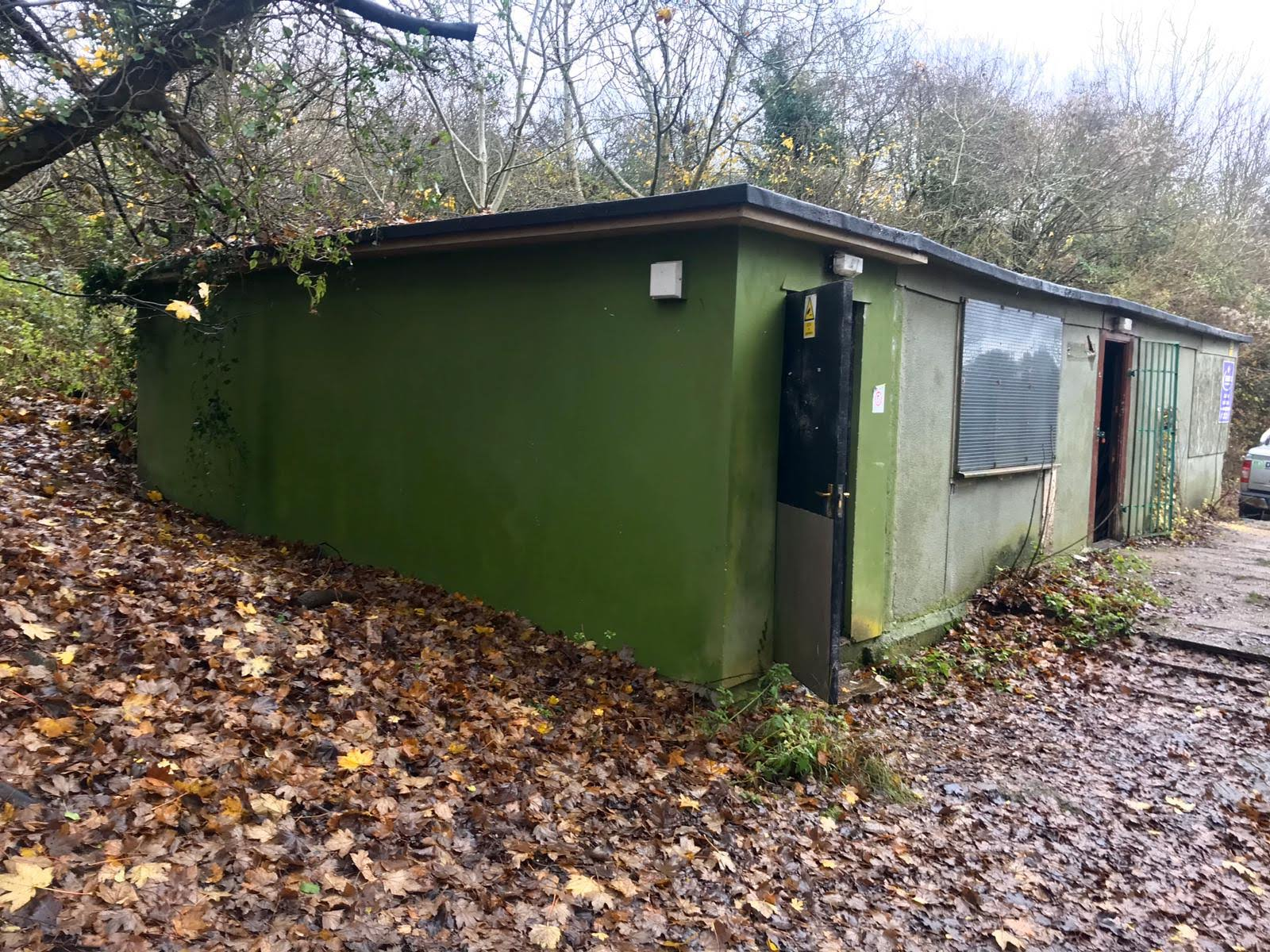
Stonesfield Scout Hut before it was destroyed in 2019

1st Stonesfield Scouts are a Beaver, Cubs and Scout group running in Stonesfield since 1948. The group caters for local children between the ages of 6 and 14 and has over 100 members with some getting put on a waiting list due to high demand. The Stonesfield Scout Hut, known as Andy's Den, was in Stonesfield Common’s woods at Stockey Bottom and could be found by taking a path off Church Fields opposite St James the Great Graveyard in the south west of Stonesfield. The scout hut was originally temporary wartime accommodation at RAF Bicester. In 1958 it was dismantled and transported via lorry to its new location. The site was demolished and cleared in late 2019 due to factors such as asbestos related health concerns, rodent infestations, and inadequate facilities. The group now aim to build a new Outdoor Education and Environmental Wellbeing Centre, fundraising for a target of £175,000.

==== The Stonesfield Slate ====
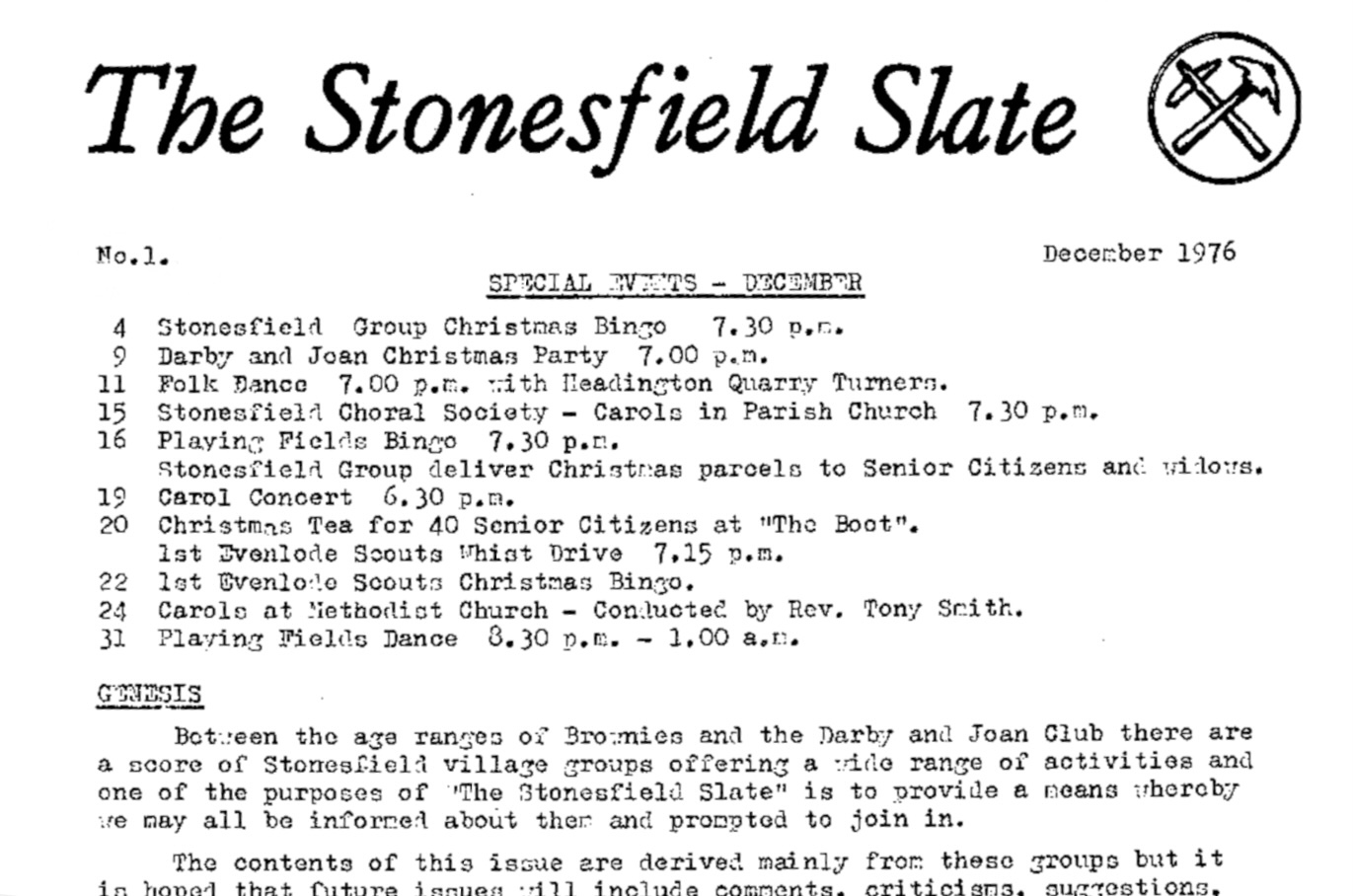
The front cover of the first edition of The Stonesfield Slate published in December 1976

The Stonesfield Slate, often known simply as the Slate, is Stonesfield's monthly village magazine named after the famous slate found in the village. It is produced and delivered by volunteers. All residents of the village have the option of being delivered a copy every month for free although physical copies are also available at the village shop and library and a digital archive of all issues can be found on Stonesfield's official Parish Council website. The Bodleian Library, who believe the Slate to be one of the longest running local magazines, keeps copies of the publication for its archive.

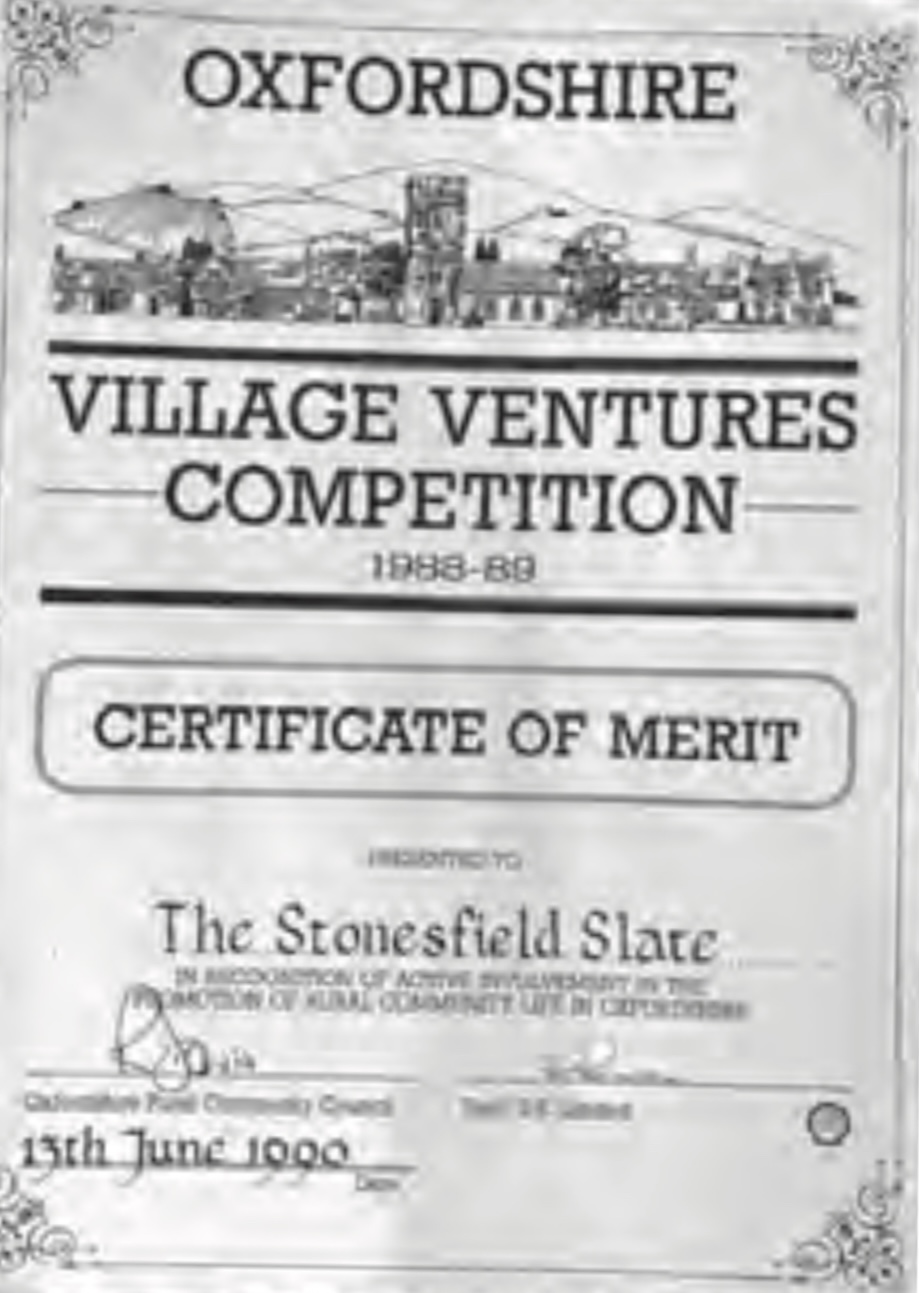
Certificate of Merit awarded to The Stonesfield Slate in 1990

The Slate was founded in December 1976 by Gordon Rudlin who wanted a newsletter which gave details about village events as he kept hearing about things after they had taken place. There have been four publishers since 2020. Richard and Dale Morris took over from Gordon in January 1998 and held the publisher role for the next seven years, bringing the publication fully into the digital age. Jenny and Simon Haviland were presented with a framed Stonesfield slate on 29 February 2020 to celebrate the 500th issue of the publication and recognise their efforts as publishers of the magazine since 2004. In response to the Havilands stepping down, Diane and Paul Bates took over as publishers from January 2020. The front page of each issue formerly had the words "With or without offence to friends or foes We sketch your world exactly as it goes." Since the personal computer hadn't been invented yet, the Slate was originally typed on a mimeograph stencil on a manual typewriter. To get the project going, Rudlin asked the Village Hall committee and various village residents for sponsorship and to volunteer as editors, typists, printers and deliverers. For many years Rachel Sherlaw Johnson's illustrations were included in small otherwise empty spaces in each issue of the magazine. On 15 June 1990 the publication won a certificate of merit in the Oxfordshire Village Ventures Competition 1988–89. The Slate had a full page photographic cover for the first time to celebrate the start of the new millennium. It was by luck that it happened to snow the day of the deadline for that issue. January 2009 is the only other time a photographic cover has been used.

==== Other ====
There was previously a skittle alley at the top of Pond Hill on The Ridings, next to The White Horse pub. Its owner, John Lloyd, received opposition to his plans to turn it into a house next to the pub which he also owned. The skittle alley is no longer present.

Stonesfield also has a Women's Institute; meetings are held monthly in Stonesfield Village Hall.

== Transport ==
=== Train ===
The nearest railway station, Finstock railway station, is 1.8 miles (2.9 km) away in the nearby village of Finstock on the Cotswold Line. There is an alternative train service to London from Oxford Parkway on Chiltern Railways.

=== Bus ===
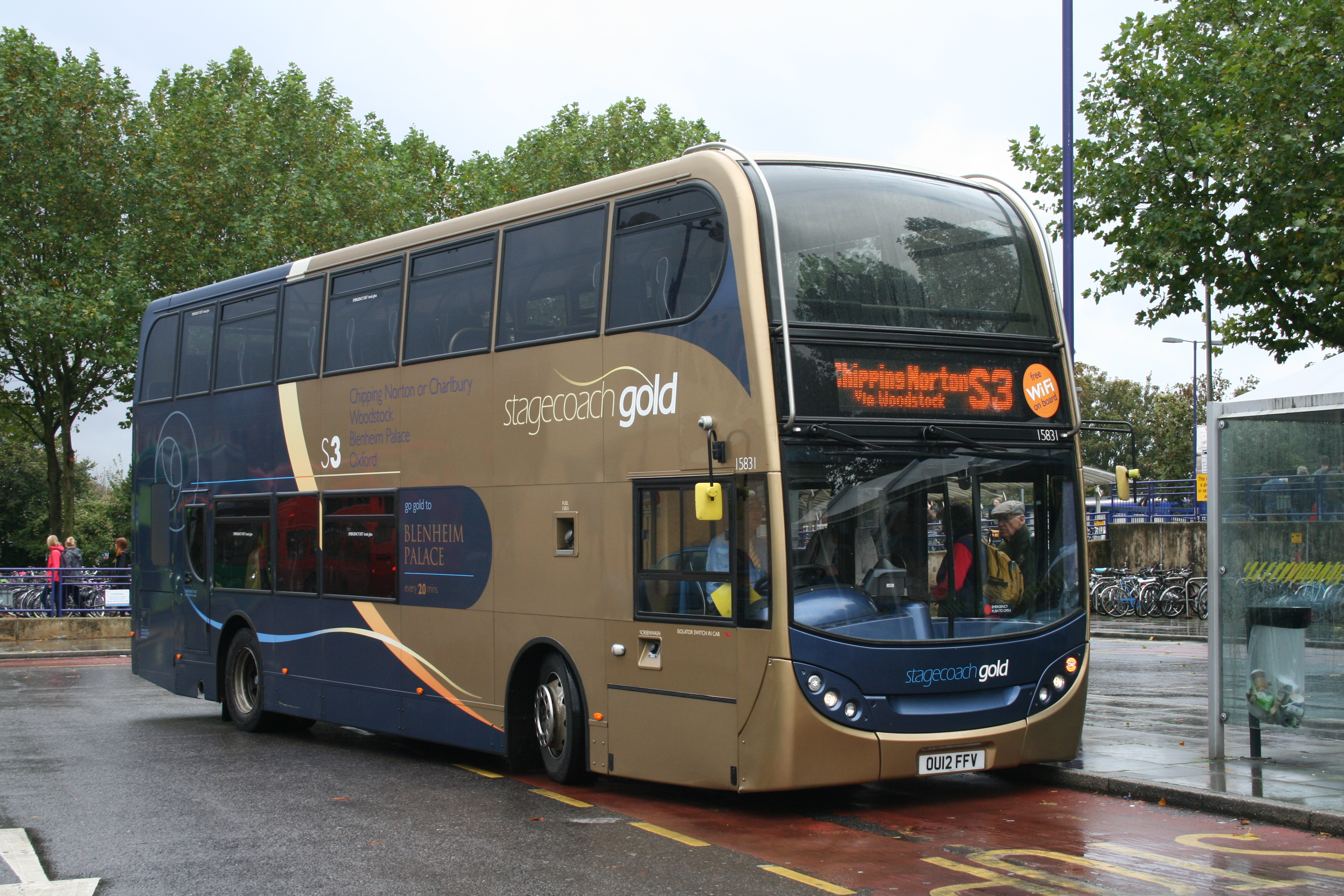
Stagecoach Gold S3 bus at Oxford Station

Stonesfield has four main bus stops: Combe Road, Prospect Close, Boot Street, and Green which are all used by Stagecoach S3 gold and 7 gold buses as well as The Villager V26 bus. The S3 and 7 provide the hourly bus service between Charlbury, Woodstock and Oxford which serves Stonesfield. Worths' Coaches of Enstone operated the route from the 1920s until 2004, when Oxfordshire County Council awarded the contract to Stagecoach in Oxfordshire. The Villager community bus service operates the V26 route between Oddington and Witney via Stonesfield. The V26 bus operates on a Monday, Tuesday and Friday only and departs from Stonesfield once in the morning, returning later in the day in the early afternoon.

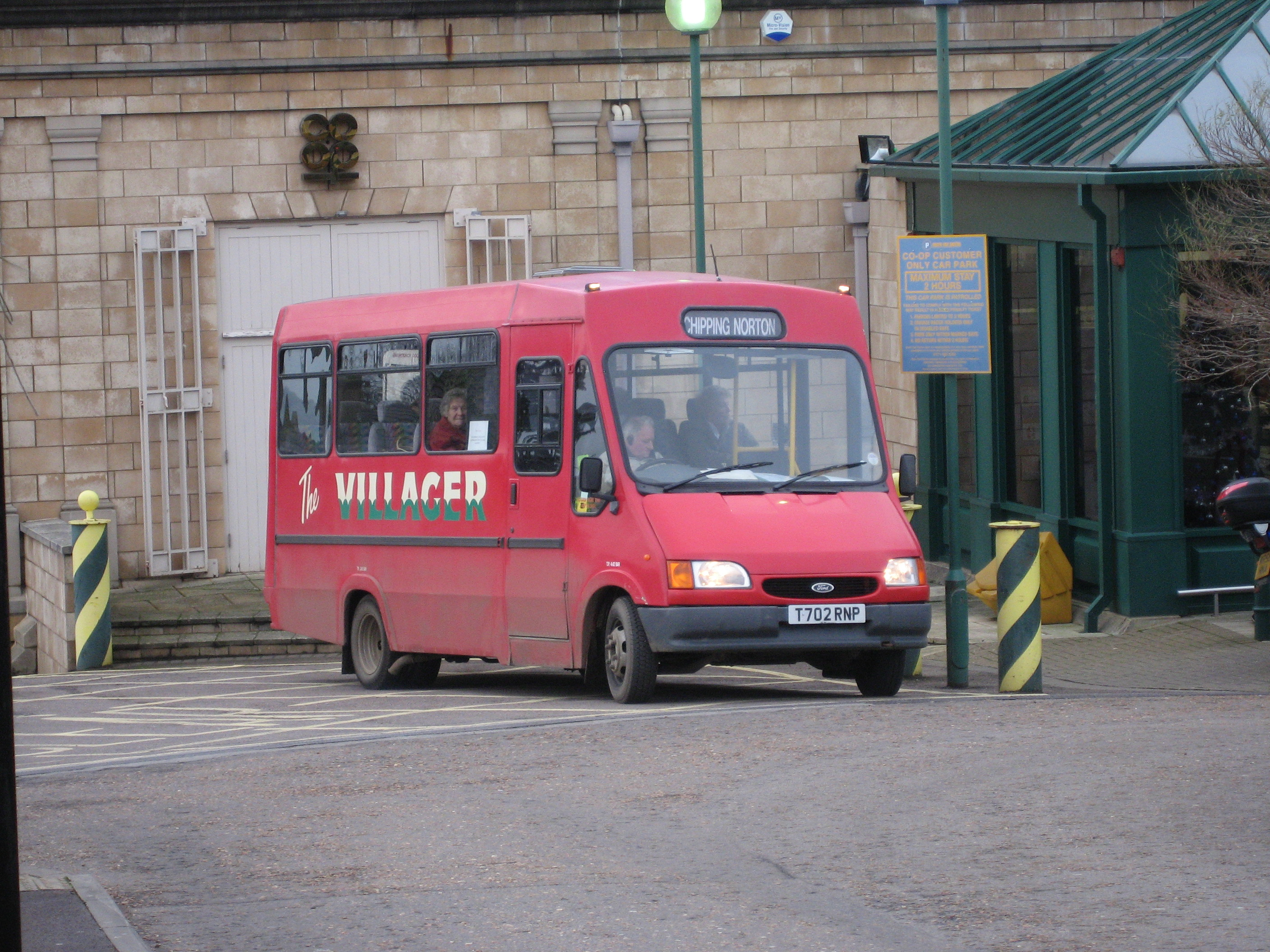
A Villager bus in Chipping Norton

=== Other ===
Stonesfield Voluntary Transport Scheme uses volunteer drivers to allow residents to get to medical facilities such as Woodstock Surgery, John Radcliffe Hospital, Nuffield Orthopaedic Centre in Oxford, and Horton General Hospital in Banbury free of charge.

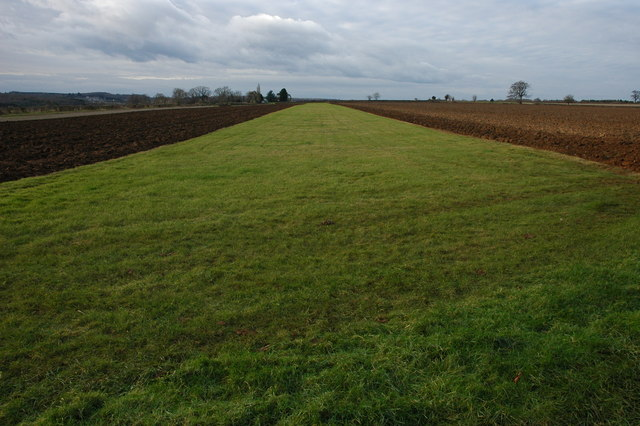
Oaklands Farm Airstrip

Stonesfield is on the Oxfordshire Way long-distance footpath, which runs for 66 miles (106 km) from Bourton-on-the-Water to Henley. The Oxfordshire Cotswolds' Step into the Cotswolds walk three is a 6.5 miles (10.5 km) route through Combe and Blenheim Great Park, starting and ending in Stonesfield. Stonesfield also features in the AA’s rated trips with a 3.5 miles (5.6 km) 1.5-hour long walk through the village and south west of the parish down to the River Evenlode. Oaklands Farm Airstrip lies in a field on the outer south west regions of Stonesfield. It's a 400-metre long, 12-metre wide, grass, private airstrip in one of Oaklands Farm's crop fields. The airstrip is thought to have featured in a flight sequence in the 2009 British film 31 North 62 East.

== Literature ==
Dr Romola Parish, an academic, lawyer, artist, and poet who studied Creative Writing at the University of Oxford has written two poems about Stonesfield during her time as poet in residence at Oxfordshire County Council, working as part of the Oxfordshire Historic Landscape Characterisation (HLC) project. Both poems are from the collection In Polygonia and were both published in The Stonesfield Slate. The first was published in April 2018 and was simply called "Stonesfield" while the second was published in March 2020 on the back page of issue 500 of The Stonesfield Slate and had the title "Stuntesfeld".

== Notable people ==
- Ed Atkins, an artist and teacher at Goldsmiths College London, famous for his multimedia poetry and video installations, was raised in Stonesfield.
- Rev. Walter Brown, rector of Handborough and St James the Great Church in Stonesfield, chaplain and librarian at Blenheim, held two residences but resided in Stonesfield in the early 1800s. Walter is credited with repairing the paving and the west end of the chancel of St James the Great Church. He privately educated British army officer Sir Augustus Almeric Spencer.
- Chris Davies, artist and runner-up in series 3 of the BBC One TV programme and competition The Big Painting Challenge, lives in the village.
- Basil Eastwood, British Ambassador (Syria 1996–2000; Switzerland 2001–2004), lived in Stonesfield until retirement, and founded the charity Cecily's Fund in the village. A Cecily's Day picnic is held every year on the lawns of Stonesfield Manor.
- Rupert Friend, actor, director, screenwriter and producer. Raised in Stonesfield and good friends with Ed Atkins.
- Nicholas Timothy Hooper, BAFTA Award-winning composer, has lived in Stonesfield since the 1980s. Nick, his wife Judith Marjorie Inez Hooper, and Susana Starling make up The Boot Band: a folk music trio. He runs his company, Nicholas Hooper Music Limited, from Sanders Gate, Churchfields.
- Robert Sherlaw Johnson, composer, lived in Stonesfield from the late 1960s until his death in 2000.
- Caroline Lucas, former leader of the Green Party of England and Wales, lived in Stonesfield until her election as an MEP in 1999. She owned this house in Stonesfield for five years.
- Gordon Rudlin, founder of The Stonesfield Slate village magazine in December 1976 and financial officer for Oxfam in Oxford for 13 years. Died at the age of 97 in 2005.
- Sir William Strang, 1st Baron Strang of Stonesfield (1893–1978), succeeded by his only son Colin Strang. Permanent Under-Secretary of State for Foreign Affairs (1949–1953) and subsequently the first Convenor of the Crossbench peers in the House of Lords from 1968 to 1974.
