= Ed Atkins =

British contemporary artist

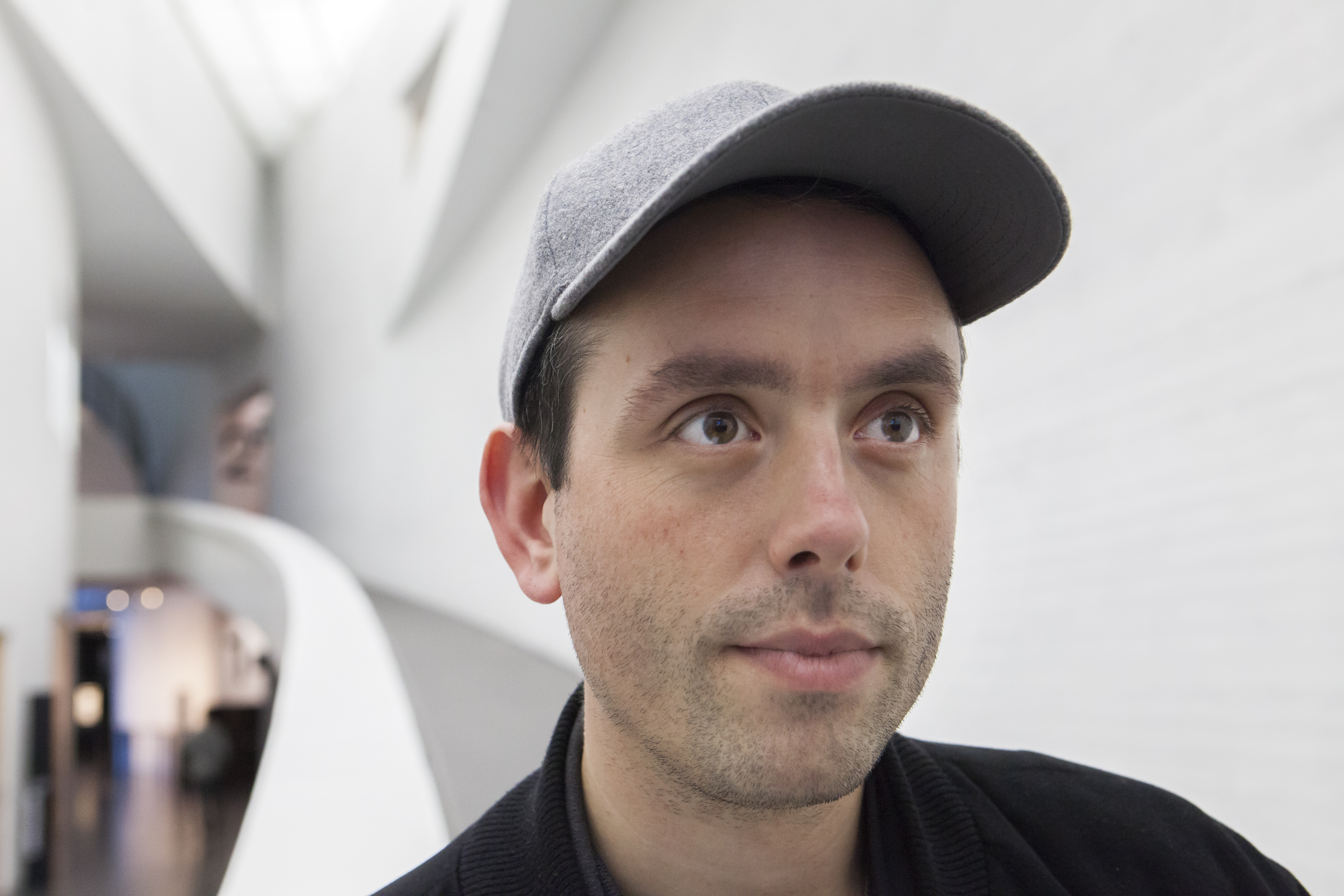
- Ed Atkins at the Kiasma museum in 2016
- Born: 1982 (age 43–44)
- Education: Central Saint Martins (BA); Slade School of Fine Art (MFA)
- Notable work: Us Dead Talk Love (2012)
- Style: Video art, high-definition video, computer animation

Ed Atkins (born 1982) is a British contemporary artist best known for his video art and poetry. He has been referred to as "one of the great artists of our time" by the Swiss curator Hans-Ulrich Obrist.

Currently based in Cophenhagen, Atkins lectures at University of Fine Arts Hamburg, having previously lectured at Goldsmiths College, London.

== Early life and education ==
Atkins was raised in Stonesfield, a small village outside Oxford. His mother was an art teacher at a public school and his father was a graphic artist.

Atkins studied for a bachelor's degree (BA) at Central Saint Martins. Subsequently, in 2009, he studied for a Master of Fine Art (MFA) at Slade School of Fine Art, University College London.

== Work ==
Through a practice that involves layering apostrophic text with high definition video, Ed Atkins makes work in which "The suck and the bloom of death and decay are channeled through technological tools at the height of contemporary image management".

Atkins' video oeuvre is composed largely of stock footage and CGI avatars that are animated using motion capture and dramatic, commercial sound. Many of these videos feature a computer generated avatar as an isolated protagonist, whose poetic soliloquies intimately address the viewer. This protagonist, often surrounded by generic stock images and cinematic special effects, has been noted as capable of procuring the uncanny valley effect.

Atkins consciously produces the majority of his work on a computer. From this laptop-based process and the works' foregrounding of video technology, he is known for his probing of the material structure of digital video. Often citing structural film artists such as Hollis Frampton as an influence, it is apparent that Atkins is interested in the technological possibilities of new media. A prolific writer, Atkins' video works are often derived from writing.

In Us Dead Talk Love (2012), a 37-minute two-channel video work, the avatar speaks on finding an eyelash under their foreskin, a confession that sparks "a meditation on authenticity, self-representation, and the possibility for love".

== Career ==
Towards the end of his studies, Atkins began working for artist Christian Marclay, joining a team of finders dedicated to sourcing film clips for Marclay’s The Clock (2010).

Atkins has had solo exhibitions at the Tate Britain, the Stedelijk Museum Amsterdam, the Chisenhale Gallery, MoMA PS1, the Serpentine Gallery, Palais de Tokyo, and Kunsthalle Zürich.

In 2012, at the Serpentine "Memory Marathon" Atkins premiered DEPRESSION, a performance work that used projection, digitally altered voice, and chroma key mask to simulate the cinematic techniques of his videos.

In conjunction with the Serpentine Extinction Marathon of 2014, Atkins produced www.80072745, a domain that invited users to sign up for a one-sided decade long email correspondence.

In 2019, Atkins participated in Performa 19 creating his performance A Catch Upon the Mirror.

Atkins collaborated with Steven Zultanski on a play Having become friends when meeting in Copenhagen, when Atkins was asked by Rikke Hedeager, of the Revolver Theatre, to produce a play, he thought of Zultanski as a potential collaborator. The script (Sorcerer, 2022) was first written in the form of a novel. It was performed by Lotte Andersen, Peter Christoffersen and Ida Cæcilie Rasmussen.

== Exhibitions ==
=== Solo ===
Year	Title	Institution	Location	Ref
	Corpsing	Museum für Moderne Kunst	Frankfurt	

=== Group ===
Year	Title	Institution	Location	Ref

=== Performances ===
Year	Title	Institution	Location	Ref
2022	Sorcerer			

== Personal life ==
Since 2020, Atkins has been living in Copenhagen with his partner, Sally Ginger, and their two young children.
