= Alan Rankle =

British artist (born 1952)

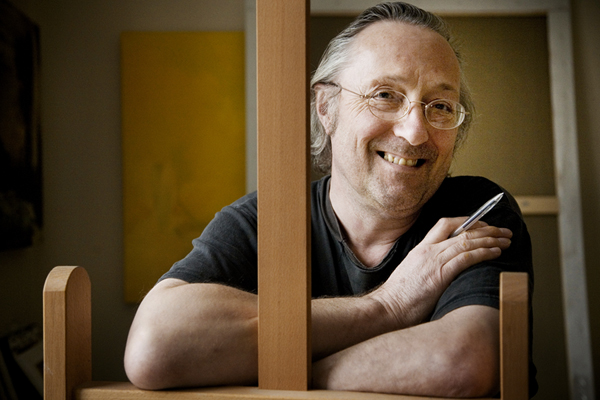
- Born: Alan Rankle; 1952 (age 73–74); Oldham, United Kingdom
- Education: Rochdale School of Art, Goldsmiths, University of London
- Known for: Painting

Alan Rankle (born 1952 in Oldham, England) is a British artist and is part of the duo Rankle & Reynolds. During a thirty-year career he has worked primarily as a painter. He explores social and environmental issues of the day through Landscape Art.

== Background ==
Rankle was born in Oldham, Lancashire, England in 1952 and studied at Rochdale School of Art (1968–70) and Goldsmiths', University of London (1970–73).

From 1973 feeling that his work, while well informed by conceptual art practice, lacked a realistic visceral dimension, he immersed himself in a study of the techniques of 17th century Dutch masters, the Abstract Expressionists and significantly the Chan painters and calligraphers of China. During 1973–76 he studied Taoist and Chan Buddhist Arts, including tai chi, with Dr. Liu Hsiu Chi. Fellow students at the Liu Academy included the musician Francis Monkman and Fritjof Capra author of 'The Tao of Physics.' During this time Rankle's pursuit of his interests in Old Master painting led him to further studies and later employment in the field of art conservation.

His first exhibition, held at the Institute of Contemporary Arts, London, was a multi-media performance/installation based on Chaucer's The Pardonner's Tale (1973).

Rankle takes as his main subject the development of landscape art as a concept related to changes in attitude to the environment. In some works he treats the entire history of landscape painting almost as a found object; manipulating and cross-referencing styles and techniques from diverse periods and cultures, within a post-modernist fusion of abstract, trompe-l'œil and figurative imagery.

Examples of his paintings are in the collections of several Lancashire museums and Hastings Museum and Art Gallery.

== Environmental concerns ==
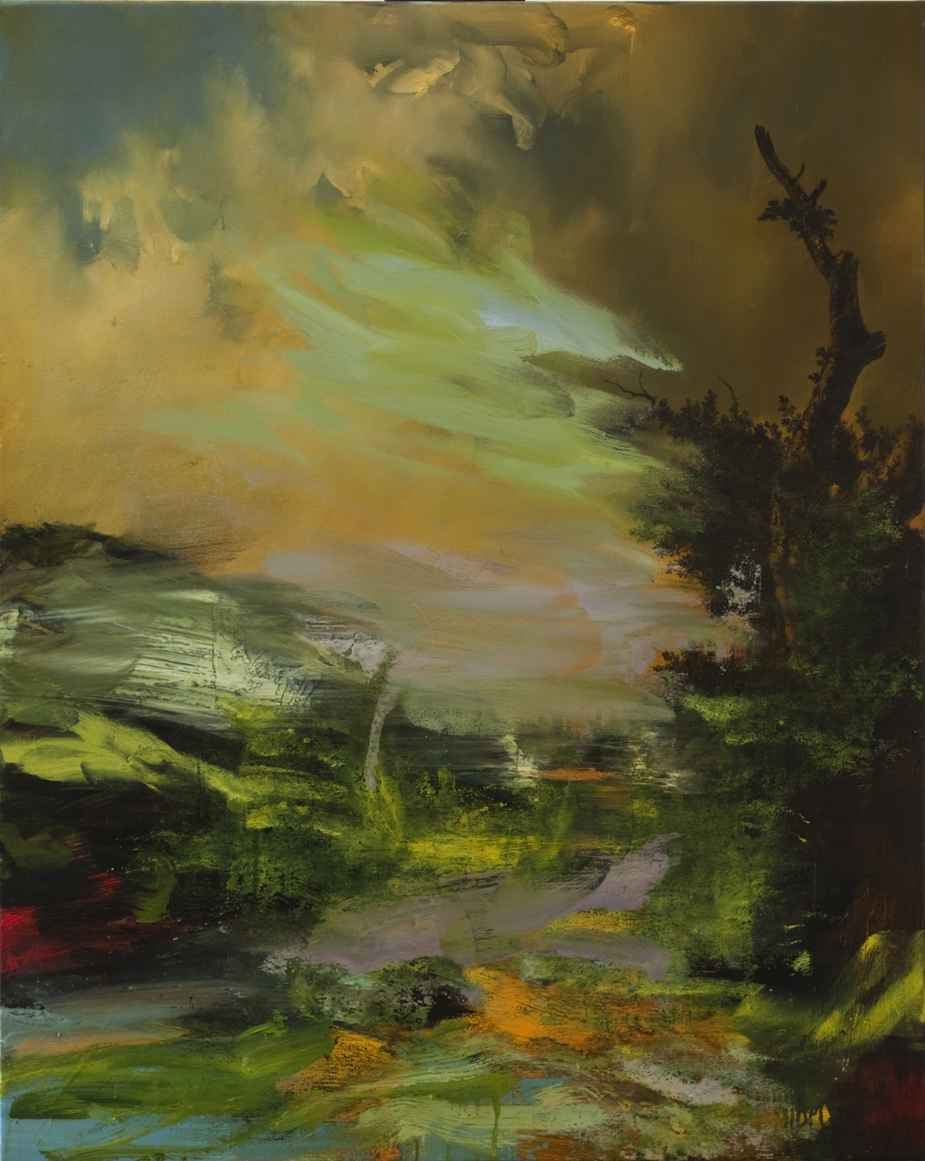
Bargain Buddha at Chadderton Asda oils on canvas, 100x80 cm; 2009; Private collection Denmark

Following a group exhibition at LYC Gallery in Cumbria, with Andy Goldsworthy and Michael Jepson; Rankle's work in landscape art became starkly politicised. In the summer of 1982 on his first trip to Finland he became aware of the effects of acid rain on the lakes and forests of Scandinavia, and the patently inadequate response of the establishment. A series of landmark installation/performance pieces followed intended to draw attention to environmental issues (often as fund raising events for Arts for the Earth, the art 'wing' of Friends of the Earth). These included a 30 metre long scroll painting produced on the top of Beachy Head in Sussex with his collaborator Jan Stephens, and several notable pieces with the left-field artists group Order out of Chaos; one of which 'Discarded Sculptures' (1986) was the first project to bring his work to the attention of a wider public.

== Earthscape ==
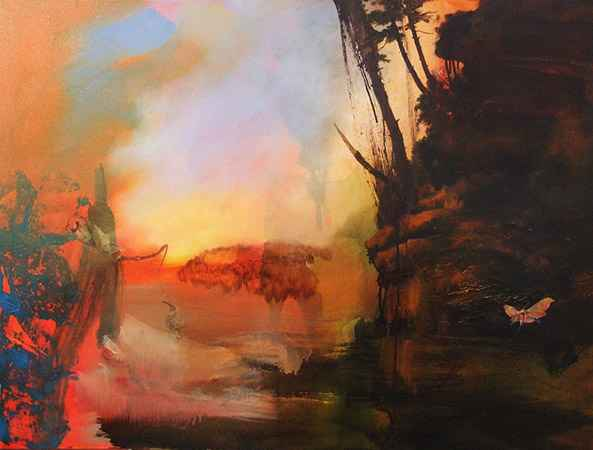
Running from the House oils on canvas, 80x100 cm; 2008/9

A period of activism in which he attempted to work within the existing mores of the conventional art world culminated in 'Earthscape' (1991), a large scale performance/installation created in the form of an International Competition on a theme of 'Environmental Solutions' where artists such as Andrew Bick and Luke Elwes were invited to submit works implying a positive response to the burgeoning environmental crisis. Curated with Christine Goldschmidt for the Hastings Trust, this project involved a wide range of collaborators including Mike von Joel, Laetitia Yhap, Andrew Graham-Dixon (who were the judges of the competition), Art in Ruins, Lynne Green, Nick Wates and the book and exhibition designer Jeremy Brook.

== Recent work ==
Since his 1993 exhibition 'Riverfall & Other Works' at Southampton Art Gallery, Rankle has concentrated on painting, with notable exhibitions at Maidstone Museum; Radicev Museum, Saratov, 1996; Danielle Arnaud/Clink Wharf Gallery, 1998; Folkestone Museum, 1999; as well as numerous gallery shows in Europe, Scandinavia and the USA.

A first retrospective exhibition, 'Landscapes for the Turning Earth', was held at Gallery Oldham 2006-07.

A second retrospective, "Selected Works 1993–2009", at Fondazione Stelline, in Milan during February and March 2010, also featured a major collaborative work with the installation artist Kirsten Reynolds entitled "On the Edge of Wrong".

== Sources ==
- Anthony Wallersteiner 'Alan Rankle:Terre Verte' Danielle Arnaud/Riverfall Press 1998
- Laurence Bristow-Smith 'Alan Rankle:Landscapes for the Turning Earth, Paintings 1986–2006' Gallery Oldham 2006
- Roger Woods 'Alan Rankle at Southampton Art Gallery' Art-Line International, Winter 1993
- Imy Antal 'Alan Rankle: Light + Meaning' Galleria Seriola, Finland, 2006
- Emanuelle Beluffi 'Alan Rankle & Kirsten Reynolds:On the Edge of Wrong' First Gallery/Italian Factory 2010
