= Bernard Hailstone =

English painter (1910–1987)

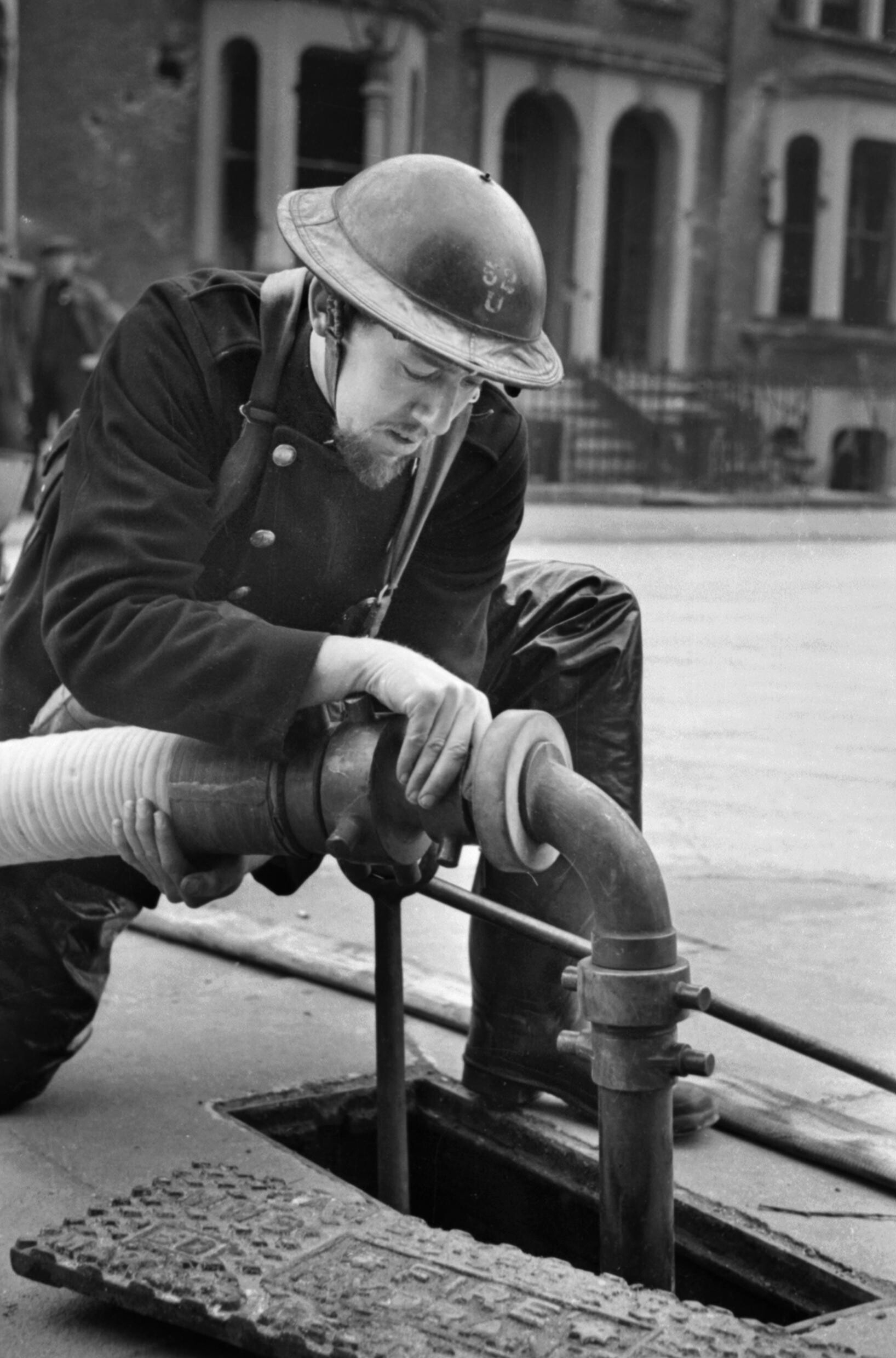
- Auxiliary Fireman Bernard Hailstone attaches a hose to a fire hydrant, London, c 1940
- Born: Bernard Hailstone; 6 October 1910
- Died: 27 December 1987 (aged 77)
- Education: Goldsmiths' College of Art; Royal Academy Schools
- Known for: Portrait painting

Bernard Hailstone (6 October 1910 – 27 December 1987) was an English painter, best known for his Second World War portraits of transport and civil defence workers painted in Britain, his portraits of members of the Armed Forces painted overseas and his post-war portraits of the royal family, musicians, stage and film actors.

== Early life ==
After education at the Judd School, Tonbridge, Hailstone attended Goldsmiths' College of Art, under James Bateman, then the Royal Academy Schools, under Walter Westley Russell.

His elder brother, Harold (1897–1982), was an established magazine illustrator and cartoonist.

== World War II ==
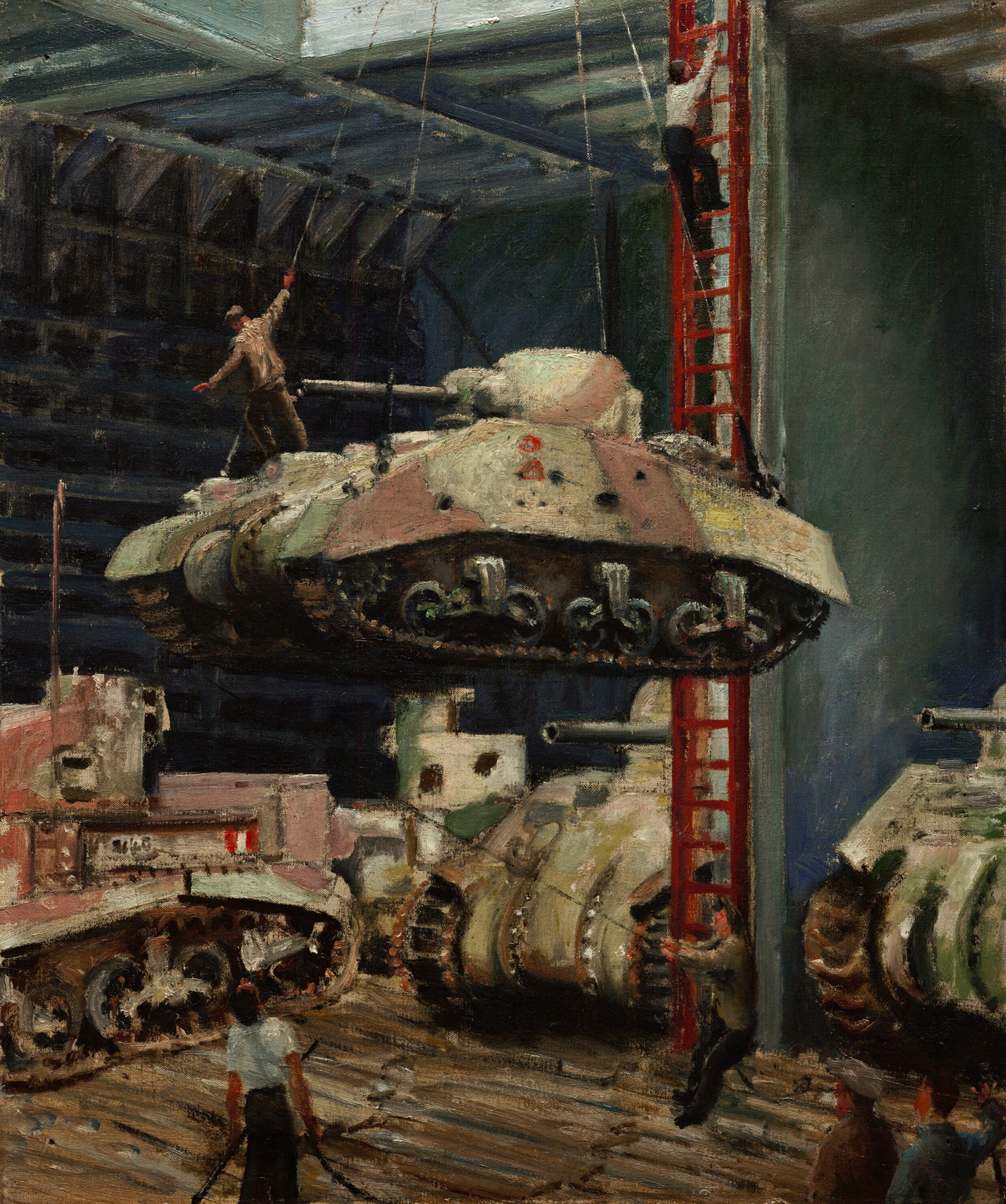
Damaged Tanks being Lowered into the Hold of a Merchant Ship (1943)

Hailstone belongs to the group of early 20th-century artists whose best-known work was done during the Second World War. At the beginning of the Second World War, Hailstone felt the need to incorporate his artistic contribution to the war effort with more physical work. He therefore joined the Auxiliary Fire Service, AFS, and witnessed at first hand the destruction caused by bombing during the Blitz. He recorded some of these scenes in his paintings. A number of other artists had joined the AFS and a firemen artists' committee had been formed which also included Leonard Rosoman, Paul Lucien Dessau, Norman Hepple and Robert Coram alongside Hailstone. The group contributed to both War Artists' Advisory Committee, WAAC, and specialist civil defence art shows, including several firemen artists' exhibitions. In 1941 WAAC, commissioned Hailstone to paint civil defence subjects. He supplemented these works with portraits of his colleagues in the fire services and other war workers. His portrait of W. M. Ladbrooke, Able Seaman, Merchant Navy (National Maritime Museum, London), was painted following a visit to the Merchant Navy convalescent home in Limpsfield, Surrey around 1943. Following his release from the fire services, Hailstone spent time painting portraits of transport and civil defence workers. In 1943 WAAC assigned him to the Ministry of War Transport and he moved to Kingston upon Hull, working mainly around the docks there, where he continued to record the effects of the war from a civilian perspective. One such work is his Big Ben the Bargee, showing a bargeman and his wife and completed in June 1943 (National Maritime Museum, London). Throughout the rest of the war Hailstone travelled through Algiers, Malta and southern Italy, recording the activities of the Merchant Navy in a similar, sympathetic vein. In June 1945, Hailstone was transferred to the Ministry of Information to record the work of the South East Asia Command during the Burma Campaign. The paintings he produced of Lord Louis Mountbatten and key members of his staff are now in the Imperial War Museum, London.

== Later life ==
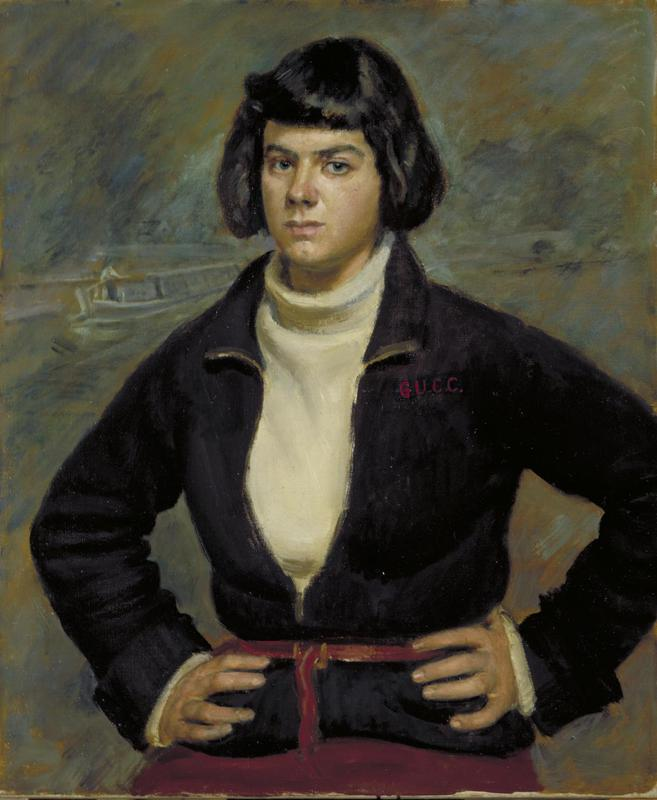
Christian Vlasto, a Canal-boat Woman (1944) (Art.IWM ART LD 4950)

After the war Hailstone had a very successful career as a portrait painter. A gregarious, outgoing man, Hailstone went on to paint the last officially commissioned portrait of Sir Winston Churchill in 1955 and members of the royal family, including the 1968 portrait of HM Queen Elizabeth II as Colonel-in-Chief of the 16th/5th Queens’s Royal Lancers, but he as happily painted ordinary members of the public. His work included portraits of Laurence Olivier, Peter Ustinov, Sir John Barbirolli and Paul Mellon. The Mellon portrait led to several commissions in America which provided the funds to save the tower and some ancillary buildings of Hadlow Castle, where Hailstone had lived from 1951, from demolition.

A portrait of South African industrialist Harry Oppenheimer by Hailstone was burned by demonstrators during the Rhodes Must Fall upheaval at the University of Cape Town in February 2016.
