= Leeds Arts University =

Specialist arts university in Leeds, England

- Former names: Leeds School of Art; Jacob Kramer College; Leeds College of Art and Design; Leeds College of Art
- Type: Arts university (HE and FE)
- Established: 1846; 180 years ago University status - 2017
- Chancellor: Skin
- Vice-Chancellor: Professor Simone Wonnacott
- Students: 2,175 (2024/25)
- Undergraduates: 2,085 (2024/25)
- Postgraduates: 95 (2024/25)
- Location: Leeds, West Yorkshire, United Kingdom; 53.8084°N 1.5517°W
- Website: www.leeds-art.ac.uk

Rankings
National rankings
- Complete (2027): 111=
- Times / Sunday Times (2027): 92

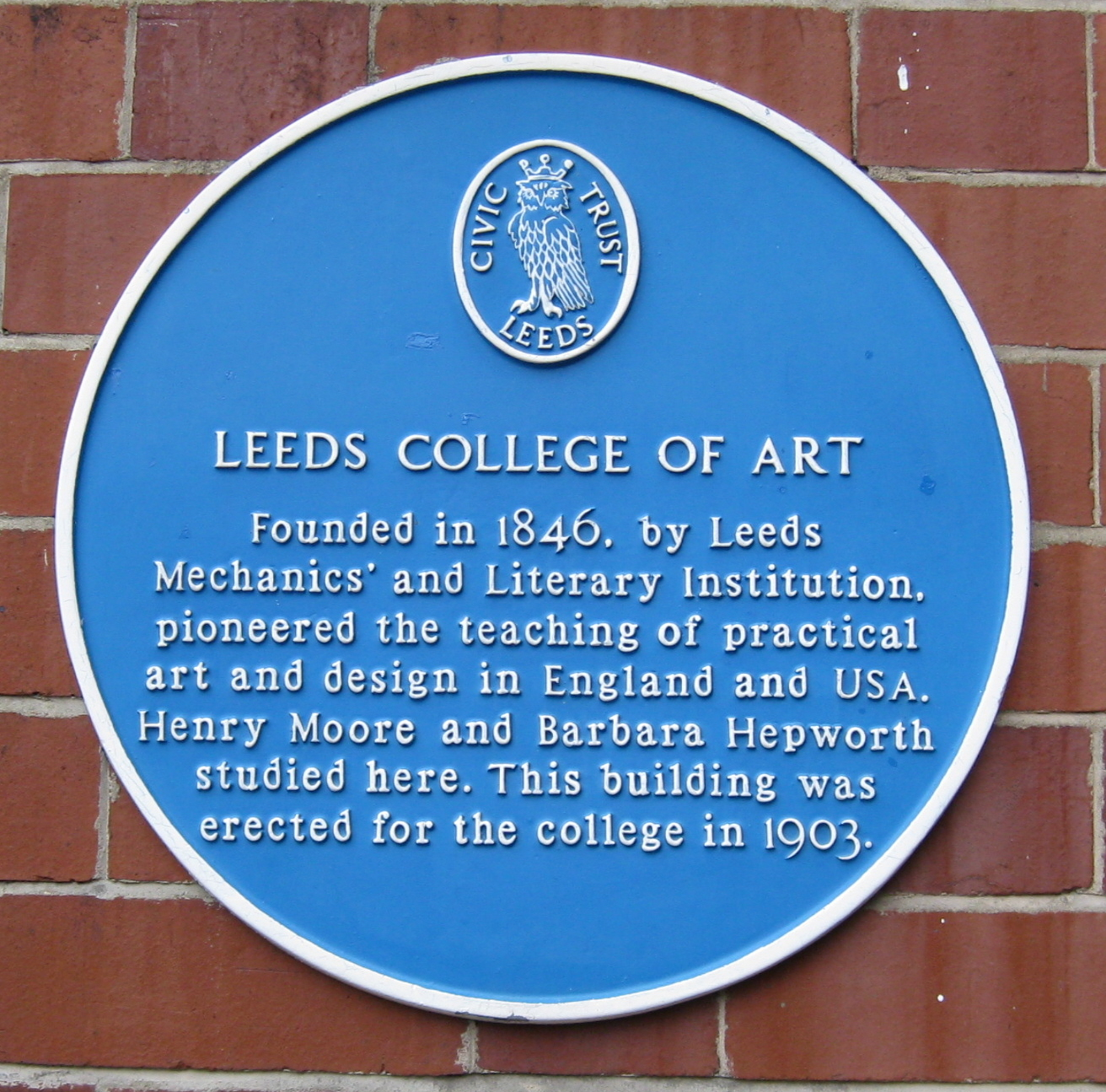
Dedicated Blue plaque at the Vernon Street site

Leeds Arts University is a specialist arts further and higher education institution, based in the city of Leeds, West Yorkshire, England, with a main campus opposite the University of Leeds.

== History ==
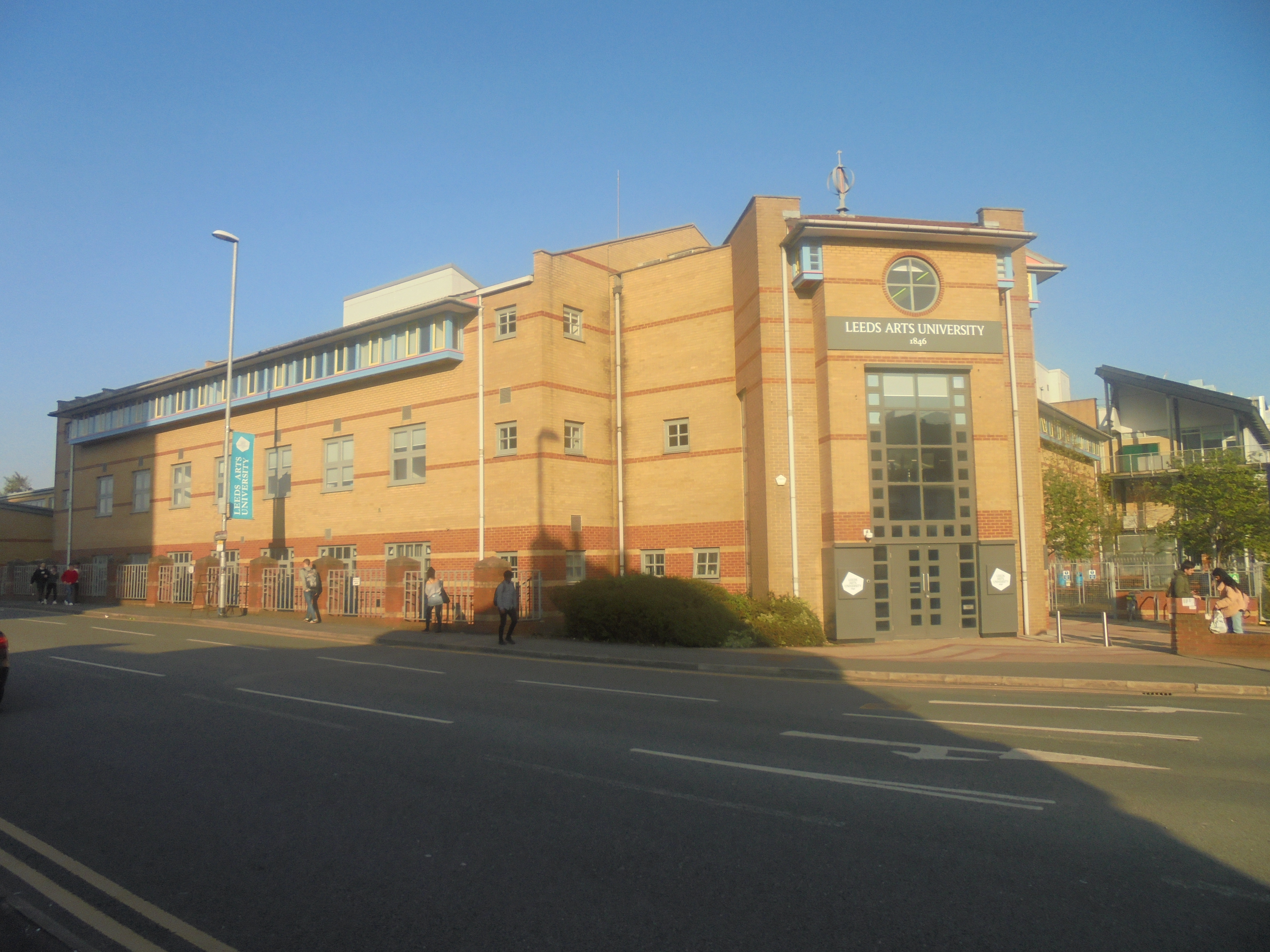
Main campus in 2018

It was founded in 1846 as the Leeds School of Art. From 1968 to 1993 it was known as Jacob Kramer College, after Jacob Kramer, having lost part of its provision to Leeds Polytechnic (the future Leeds Beckett University). It was known as Leeds College of Art and Design until 2009, and then as Leeds College of Art. In August 2017, the school was granted university status and the name was changed to Leeds Arts University.

Skin, DJ, fashion icon, actress, activist and lead singer of Skunk Anansie, was appointed as the university's chancellor in 2021.

== Locations ==
The University today has city centre sites at Blenheim Walk and at Vernon Street.

== Academic profile ==
=== Further education courses ===
- Extended Diploma in Creative Practice
- Foundation Diploma in Art & Design - one of the largest in the country, with 280 students validated by the University of the Arts London

=== Undergraduate courses ===
- BA (Hons) Acting For Screen
- BA (Hons) Animation
- BA (Hons) Comic & Concept Art
- BA (Hons) Creative Advertising
- BA (Hons) Creative Writing
- BA (Hons) Fashion Branding with Communication
- BA (Hons) Fashion Design
- BA (Hons) Fashion Photography
- BA (Hons) Filmmaking
- BA (Hons) Fine Art
- BA (Hons) Graphic Design
- BA (Hons) Illustration
- BA (Hons) Photography
- BMus (Hons) Popular Music Performance
- BA (Hons) Textile Design
- BA (Hons) Visual Communication

=== Postgraduate courses ===
- MA Animation
- MA Creative Practice
- MA Fine Art
- MA Graphic Design
- MA Illustration and Graphic Novel
- MA Photography

== Student body ==
Like many of the 'traditional' British art schools, it has a modest annual intake, at 2,145 higher education students in 2024/25. Out of 169 UK higher education institutions, it is the 146th largest.

== Notable alumni ==
- Norman Ackroyd (1938–2024), artist
- Sam Ainsley (b. 1950), artist
- Kenneth Armitage (1916–2002), sculptor
- Glyn Banks, co-founder of Art in Ruins art practice
- James Bateman (1893–1959), painter
- Glen Baxter (b. 1944), artist
- Trevor Bell (1930–2017), artist
- Alison Britton (b. 1948), ceramics tutor at the Royal College of Art
- Henry Carr (1894–1970), painter and war artist
- Michael Chapman (1941–2021), guitarist, musician and singer
- Paul Clark (b. 1962), musician
- Elisabeth Collins (1904–2000), painter and sculptor
- Raymond Coxon (1896–1997), painter
- Diz Disley (1931–2010), musician and graphic artist
- Leigh Francis (b. 1973), comedian
- Marcus Harvey (b. 1963), painter
- Barbara Hepworth (1903–1975), sculptor
- Damien Hirst (b. 1965), artist and 1995 Turner Prize winner
- Jocelyn Horner (1902–1973), sculptor
- Thomas Houseago (b. 1972), sculptor
- Percy Hague Jowett (1882–1955), artist and arts administrator
- Vivien Knight (1953–2009), art historian and gallerist
- Jacob Kramer (1892–1962), painter
- Edna Lumb (1931–1992), painter
- Henry Moore (1898–1986), sculptor
- Peter Murphy (b. 1959), Stuckist artist
- Philip Naviasky (1894–1983) painter, both as student and then long-standing teacher
- Stass Paraskos (1933–2014), painter and founder of the Cyprus College of Art
- Bob Peck (1945–1999), actor
- Vivian Pitchforth (1895–1982), artist
- Adrian Riley (b. 1971), artist and designer
- Victor Sloan (b. 1945), visual artist
- Bernard Schottlander (1924–1999), sculptor
- Ria Sharma (b. 1992), founder of Make Love Not Scars
- Georgina Starr (b. 1968), artist
- Cecil Stephenson (1889–1965), artist
- Frankie Vaughan (1928–1999), singer
- Hilda Annetta Walker (1877–1960), artist
- Harold Sandys Williamson (1892–1978), painter
- Trevor Winkfield (b. 1944), painter and writer
- Joash Woodrow (1927–2006), painter
