= Norman Hepple =

English painter (1908-94)

- Born: 18 May 1908; London, England
- Died: 3 January 1994 (aged 85); London, England
- Education: Goldsmiths College of Art; Royal Academy Schools
- Known for: Painting, drawing

Robert Norman Hepple RA RP (18 May 1908 – 3 January 1994) was an English portrait painter, engraver and sculptor, best known for his portraits of the British royal family. He was elected a member of the Royal Society of Portrait Painters in 1948 and served as their president from 1979 to 1983. Elected as an Associate Member to the Royal Academy of Arts in 1954, Hepple became an Academician in 1961.

== Biography ==
=== Early life ===
Hepple was born in London and was the son of the painter Robert Watkin Hepple and the nephew of Wilson Hepple, the animal painter from Northumbria. Hepple studied at Goldsmiths College of Art and then the Royal Academy Schools, under Sir Walter Russell, where he obtained a scholarship in engraving. During the 1930s Hepple illustrated the books of the Shropshire novelist Mary Webb.

=== World War II ===
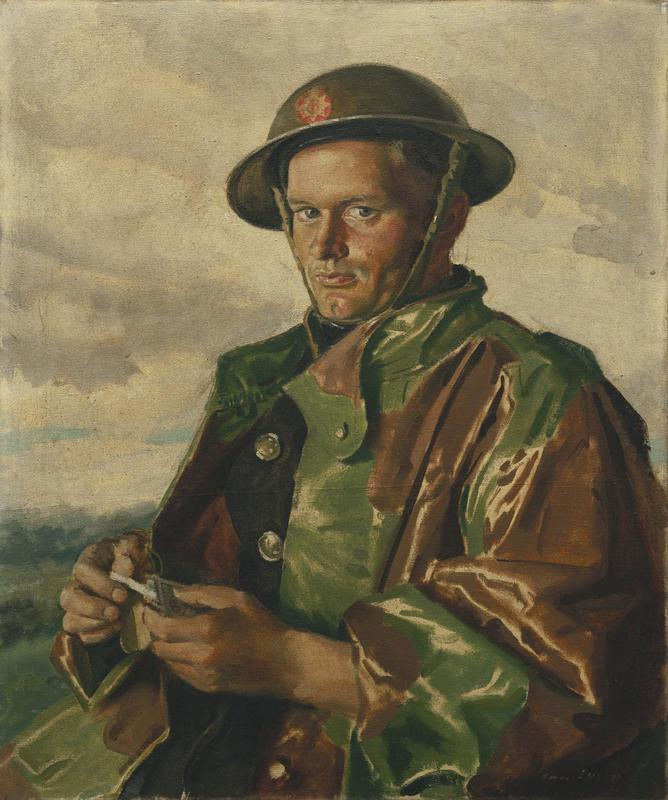
Canadian Fireman, Overseas Contingent (1944) (Art.IWM ART LD 4721)

At the start of the Second World War Hepple joined the Auxiliary Fire Service, which in 1941 became the National Fire Service, NFS, and served as a fire-fighter during the London Blitz. A number of other artists had joined the NFS and a firemen artists' committee had been formed which included Leonard Rosoman, Bernard Hailstone, Paul Lucien Dessau and Robert Coram. As well as contributing to both War Artists' Advisory Committee, WAAC, and specialist civil defence art shows, the firemen held several of their own exhibitions. WAAC initially purchased two paintings by Hepple, one in 1940 and another in 1941. In 1943 WAAC commissioned a series of drawings from Hepple of NFS personnel and were to purchase another five paintings, including a fine portrait of a Canadian fire-fighter, from him before the war ended. At least one painting by Hepple was included in the firemen artists exhibitions that toured America during the war.

=== Post-war career ===
After the war Hepple resumed his career as a professional artist. In 1950 he designed a poster for British Railways, Service to Industry and Shipbuilding. He painted portraits of Queen Elizabeth II on three occasions;- in 1965 for the Royal Marines, in 1978 for the island of Jersey and also in 1978 for the submarine officers of HMS Dolphin. He painted notable portraits of Prince Charles, Prince Philip and of the Queen Mother, who sat for him for four separate commissions. His 1978 portrait of Queen Elizabeth was adapted for use on banknotes issued in Jersey. Hepple was elected a member of the Royal Society of Portrait Painters in 1948 and served as their president from 1979 to 1983. The New English Art Club elected Hepple as a member in 1950. He was elected as an Associate Member to the Royal Academy of Arts in 1954, and became a full Academician in 1961. Failing eyesight eventually curtailed his painting career. He died from injuries he received after being run over by a motorist whilst returning to his home in Richmond in London from a meeting at the Royal Academy.
