= David Thorpe =

David Thorpe may refer to:

- David Thorpe, American music writer, satirist, and columnist for Something Awful
- David Thorpe (footballer) (born 1948), Australian rules footballer
- Dave Thorpe (born 1954), British comic book writer and novelist
- David Thorpe (motorcyclist) (born 1962), British motorcyclist
- David Thorpe (artist) (born 1972), English artist
- David Thorpe (basketball), American basketball trainer and NBA analyst

== See also ==
- David Thorp (born 1947), British curator and director
- David Thorp (politician), see 55th New York State Legislature
