= Tania Singh =

Founder, Indian nonprofit organisation

Tania Singh is the C.E.O of Make Love Not Scars, a non profit that rehabilitates acid attack survivors in India. Singh runs a rehab centre and sanctuary for acid attack survivors in New Delhi. She is a graduate of Singapore Management University. While at college in Singapore, she had suffered a fire accident which led her to undertake research on the medical care facilities in India. As she did more research into the facilities available for burn patients, she saw a heart-rending photograph of an acid attack survivor on the internet and was left totally shocked. Upon discovering the lack of proper medical care available to acid attack survivors in India, Singh decided to do something about it. She began to volunteer at a then rising non-profit for acid attack survivors called Make Love Not Scars and is now the co-founder and C.E.O of the organisation. Previously, she had a brief stint at a start-up in Kuala Lumpur but quit within 3 months to return to India and take a permanent, full-time role with Make Love Not Scars.

Singh is the author of Being Reshma:The Extraordinary Story of an Acid Attack Survivor who Took the World by Storm. It is the memoir of Reshma Qureshi, the world's first acid attack survivor to walk New York Fashion Week. The book has been translated into 4 languages; Marathi, Hindi, Portuguese and Malayalam.

Singh was also awarded the International Women's Day Award for Outstanding Woman Achiever in Social Activism by the Indian Council for UN Relation on March 2, 2020 Her book, Being Reshma, has been nominated for numerous prizes. It was nominated for the best English non-fiction (2019) for the Valley of Words Book Prize and long-listed for the Atta Galatta Book Prize. Singh won the best non-fiction prize at the Gurgaon Literature Festival.
