= David Thorp =

British curator and director

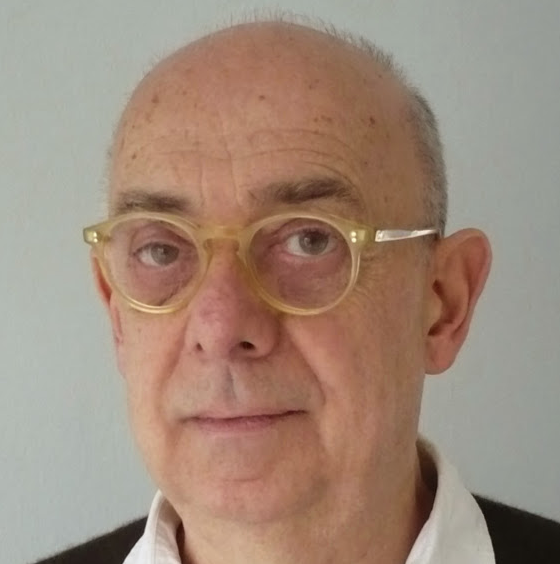

Personal details
- Born: David Thorp; 26 March 1947 (age 79)
- Citizenship: United Kingdom

David Thorp (born 26 March 1947) is a British artist, independent curator and director. He curated GSK Contemporary at the Royal Academy of Arts and Wide Open Spaces at PS1 MoMA New York, among many others. He was Curator of Contemporary Projects at the Henry Moore Foundation and was also director of the South London Gallery, The Showroom and Chisenhale. He has been Associate Director for Artes Mundi, the biannual contemporary art exhibition and prize at the National Museum of Wales, and following the death of Michael Stanley in late September 2012 was appointed Interim Director at Modern Art Oxford. He was a member of the Turner Prize jury in 2004. Since the beginning of 2005, Thorp has been an independent curator organising and initiating various projects in the UK and abroad. Thorp has held the positions of International Adjunct Curator at PS1 MoMA New York, Associate Curator at Platform China, Beijing, Curator of the Frank Cohen Collection, one of the most important collections of contemporary art in the UK.

Thorp writes extensively on contemporary art and has sat on numerous selection panels for art awards both in the UK and abroad.

== Early life ==
Thorp was born and educated in London attending a Foundation course at Camberwell College of Arts. He studied at Hammersmith College and completed a Master's degree at Flinders University in South Australia. His first major curatorial assignment came in Australia in 1985 when Thorp curated the exhibition programme for the 1986 Adelaide Festival.

== Chisenhale Gallery ==
When Thorp returned from Australia to the UK he was active in the development of the contemporary art scene in the East End of London as a part of which Thorp established Chisenhale Gallery. In 1986 Thorp became director of Chisenhale Gallery. He curated a programme of exhibitions of emerging artists from the UK and abroad and converted the gallery, which had been a shell when he arrived. Before his appointment Chisenhale was unestablished as an exhibition space and was principally occupied as artists studios. Thorp showed works by Ron Haselden presented the collective show "Ruins of Glamour, Glamour of Ruins" with Art in Ruins, Stewart Home, Ed Baxter, and others. Thorp has always worked with living artists at the forefront of experimental visual culture.

== The Showroom ==
Thorp stayed in the East End to develop a second public gallery, The Showroom, which had been underused for some time, and curated an exhibition programme that made it one of London's most interesting experimental galleries. Both Chisenhale and The Showroom continue to maintain a thriving presence on the London contemporary art scene. During his time from 1988 until 1992 as director of The Showroom, Thorp presented seminal new works by Art in Ruins, Mona Hatoum, Rasheed Araeen and Marc Camille Chaimowicz. He contributed to the signature aspect of The Showroom's exhibition policy – the offer of an artist's first solo show in London – was developed and refined so that the focus became the commissioning of individual artists to make new work for the space. During his time at The Showroom Thorp also worked as an independent curator. He organised exhibitions of contemporary art from the former Soviet Union and India as well as several other exhibitions in London and the regions. In 1990 Thorp curated an exhibition of contemporary British art that was shown in Kiev and Moscow.

== The South London Gallery ==
Thorp was appointed as Director of the South London Gallery in 1992, the exhibition programme began to focus on the latest developments in contemporary art and the Gallery came to be known as the South London Gallery. Under Thorp's direction the South London Gallery became one of London's foremost venues for contemporary art. Thorp developed a programme of exhibitions and events that included education activities, talks, live art, and public art projects. After a gap of ten years, the SLG began once again to collect contemporary works relating to South London with the help of the Contemporary Art Society (CAS). Presenting solo shows featuring artists such as Julian Schnabel, Gilbert & George, Tracey Emin and correspondingly exhibiting works by Sarah Lucas, Gary Hume, Damien Hirst, Mat Collishaw. Purchases in this period included pieces by Antony Gormley, Anish Kapoor and Tracey Emin. Under Thorp's direction SLG received a major 1996 Prudential Arts Award for excellence in the arts. In 1997 Thorp was nominated for a Prudential Creative Briton award.

== Henry Moore Foundation ==
In February 2001, Thorp was appointed Curator of Contemporary Projects at The Henry Moore Foundation. It finished activities in 2004. Thorp's role was to originate and implement a programme of contemporary art projects in the UK and abroad that introduced overseas artists to the UK and presented the work of British artists abroad. In 2003 as part of the Contemporary Projects programme Thorp organised and curated the Foundation's presence at the Liverpool Biennial. Converting an old school into a site for a series of large installations on the ground floor and in the playground with artists' studios above where the participating artists worked in advance of the event. Other major off site installations in 2003 included the mounting of Simon Callery's vast sculpture The Segsbury Project at Dover Castle and Paul McCarthy's huge inflatable Blockhead on the embankment at Tate Modern.

In 2003 and 2005 Thorp successively curated two exhibitions as a part of the Extra 50 at the Venice Biennale. Stopover located in the building and grounds of a former nunnery and subsequently God is Great in a converted high school gymnasium.

== Frank Cohen Collection ==
Early in 2007 collector Frank Cohen opened Initial Access, a venue for his extensive collection of international contemporary art, on the outskirts of Wolverhampton, England. Comprising two large industrial units, the venue was open to the public and presented four exhibitions per year, with Thorp as curator.

== Turner Prize ==
Thorp shared the panel of judges in 2004 with Catherine David, Adrian Searle, Robert Taylor and Nicholas Serota who was Chairman of the Jury. The four nominees for the shortlist were Kutlug Ataman, Jeremy Deller, Ben Langlands and Nikki Bell (who work as a partnership) and Yinka Shonibare. It was Jeremy Deller's video study of George Bush's home state that won him the £25,000 Turner prize.

== Frieze Sculpture Park ==
Thorp was Curator of the annual Outdoor Sculpture Park for the Frieze Art Fair in London from 2005 to 2011, selecting and exhibiting up to twenty large outdoor sculptures from an international submission.

== Institute of Contemporary Art ==
From June 2009 to March 2011 Thorp oversaw a period of transition at the ICA, London. He became the Interim Head of Programme while the process of appointing a new Director was underway. As well as supervising the exhibition and cinema programme he reinstated Live Art as a central part of the ICA's activities.

== Calvert 22 ==
From 2009 to 2011, Thorp was Associate Artistic Director of Calvert 22, London, a foundation specialising in the exhibition of Russian and Eastern European contemporary art.

== GSK Contemporary ==
In 2008/09 Thorp was Curator of GSK Contemporary at the Royal Academy. This consisted of producing a series of exhibitions and events in the former Museum of Mankind in Burlington Gardens, London over a three-month period. Conceived to explore the dynamics of contemporary art and its relationship to other art forms. A broad range of international artists from Europe, Asia and the US participated in over 100 exhibitions, live events, film screenings, symposia, performance, experimental theatre and music.

The exhibition included environments created by Marc Camille Chaimowicz, David Medalla, Georgina Starr, Brian Griffiths. Plastique Fantastique (David Burrows and Simon O'Sullivan). There were Installations, social events, and performances by Spartacus Chetwynd (Helmut Newton Ladies Nights), Bob & Roberta Smith with Le Suisse Marocain and Leonardo Ulian (kiosk & piano bar), Mark Titchner (psychosomatic acid test), Gail Pickering (convention centre), Tai Shani (tableau performance), Reza Aramesh (street occupation), Alexander Hidalgo (fashion/music event), Lindsay Seers (cinema performance), Pil and Galia Kollectiv (sci-fi banquet), Anthony Gross (LED eyes), Luke Oxley (shop), Adam Nankervis (performance), Paul O'Neill (General Idea films and DJ set), David Burrows and Kit Poulson (contacting angels), David Blamey and Craig Richards (sound). The Exhibition included live music by the Apathy Band, the Readers, the No No Band, Victor Mount, Leigh Clarke. 'Sawing off the Branch I'm Sitting on': Selection by John Millar with Ruby Pester & Nadia Rossi, Hysteria on Film (films by Carol Morley and Richard Squires), Cara Ball Tolmie, Omnivore Demon, Let Me Feel Your Finger First, Ming Ming and the Ching Chings and Colin Miller & David James Grinly. Mark Pearson (stagtronic). Jason Underhill (karaoke). Evel Gazebo play Hawkwind's 'Space Ritual'. Young UK fashion show, Poker All Stars, Bistrotheque Monday Cabaret with Bourgeois & Maurice and Jonny Woo, and more.

== The Performance Studio ==
Thorp established The Performance Studio as a new production and rehearsal space for some of the UK's foremost experimental artists. Intended to be a hub for the development of projects in experimental theatre, live art and moving image. Somewhere from which finished productions emerged into the world. Initially located within V22 Workspace in Bermondsey, South East London, The Performance Studio was briefly situated at 11 New Quebec Street in 2014 before establishing a residency at the Nines in Peckham's Copeland Place.

== Personal life ==
David Thorp married Juliet Thorp in 1974 and has three sons.
