= Joash Woodrow =

English artist (1927–2006)

Joash Woodrow (April 6, 1927 – February 15, 2006) was a reclusive English artist.

Woodrow was born in Leeds, West Yorkshire, of Polish-Jewish parents, and was one of eight siblings. He studied at Leeds College of Art, and from 1950 to 1953 at the Royal College of Art, where his contemporaries included Peter Blake and Frank Auerbach.

Shortly after graduating, Woodrow became ill and returned to his parents' home in Chapel Allerton, where he would remain for much of his life. From this time onwards, and virtually unknown to the wider art establishment, he painted prolifically: over seven hundred paintings, including numerous large works and 3,500 drawings and sketches. In 2000 he became too ill to cope with living on his own and was moved to sheltered accommodation.

As part of a clearance of the artist's house, his extensive collection of art books were bought by a local bookshop. Nine of the books contained drawings by Woodrow and these were discovered by the Leeds artist Christopher Wood who in turn showed the book he had bought to art dealer Andrew Stewart. On a follow-up visit to the bookshop Stewart bought the remaining books with drawings and visited the artists house the following day, where he discovered a vast collection of previously unseen paintings and drawings spanning a period of more than fifty years.

Woodrow occasionally worked on unusual materials – some oil paintings were produced on improvised canvasses of hessian from coal sacks, or cardboard boxes.

The first exhibition of his work was held at 108 Fine Art in Harrogate in 2001, followed by public art gallery retrospectives in Leeds, Manchester and the Royal College of Art in October 2005. Other solo exhibitions have been held at The Fine Art Society London, Leeds Metropolitan University Art Gallery, Hull University Art Gallery, Liverpool University Art Gallery and at The Pannet Art Gallery, Whitby.

His story has attracted considerable press interest, and was covered in The Sunday Times, The Times and Spectator magazine as well as the Yorkshire Post and Whitby Gazette. In October 2009 thirty of his paintings were shown at The Fine Art Society, London.

His work can be found in several major private and public art collections including Leeds City Art Gallery; The Stanley and Audrey Burton Art Gallery at The University of Leeds; Manchester Art Gallery; Ben Uri Gallery, London; and The University of Hull's art gallery.

A play based on the artist's life story was produced by Liz Postlethwaite and successfully toured the North of England in 2013.

Woodrow died in a Manchester hospital in February 2006.

Joash Woodrow is represented by 108 Fine Art, Harrogate.
