= Make Love Not Scars =

Indian nonprofit organisation based in New Delhi

- Formation: 2014
- Founder: Ria Sharma
- Type: Nonprofit organization
- Legal status: Active
- Headquarters: New Delhi, India
- Region served: India
- Fields: Rehabilitation of acid attack survivors, legal aid, education, empowerment
- CEO: Tania Singh
- Awards: Warc Asian Strategy Prize (Gold, 2016); Innovative Channel Thinking Award (2016)
- Website: makelovenotscars.org

Make Love Not Scars is an Indian nonprofit organisation based in New Delhi. The organisation works with acid attack survivors and was founded by Ria Sharma. Tania Singh is the C.E.O of Make Love Not Scars. It assists with the rehabilitation of acid attack survivors, including providing financial, legal and educational help. As of 6 November 2016, the organisation had helped approximately 70 survivors across India. In 2017 the organisation faced allegations of misuse of funds and not forwarding them to the victims. The following year, the Mumbai police filed a closure report in the case and exonerated Sharma of all charges.

== History ==
Ria Sharma founded Make Love Not Scars in 2014 while she was a fashion student at Leeds College of Art in the United Kingdom. As a part of her final year project, she set out to film a documentary on acid attack survivors in India. However, after witnessing the appalling conditions of acid attack survivors in India, she decided to start an organisation instead. She told Isis Madrid of Public Radio International:

"While I was shooting the documentary, I found myself in a government hospital burn ward. The things I saw in the ward left me forever changed. I had never witnessed so much misery all at once, I had never been surrounded by so much pain. When you are in that situation you have two options, you could either return to the comfort of your own life or you could try and make someone else's life comfortable."

The founder was also featured on Mithaq Kazimi's show Konversations in which she explored the need for social activism to be relatable to young people so they could help with various social ills.

== Rehabilitation centre ==
Make Love Not Scars launched India's first rehabilitation centre in New Delhi in March 2016. A first of a kind centre, it provides acid attack survivors with medical treatment, financial aid, legal support, vocational training and psychological treatment. The centre also helps survivors overcome their emotional struggles through recreational activities such as Yoga and poetry classes.

The centre hosts various classes including English and computer classes. Workshops consist of activities such as confidence building, makeup tutorials and legal expertise.

The centre also contains accommodation for survivors who are seeking refuge from perpetrators of their attack. The centre is partly funded by community donations and largely funded by corporate funders. Automotive giant Magneti Marelli donated approximately 31,000 USD for operational costs for the rehabilitation centre in the year 2016. Other corporate donors include Urban Clap and Urban Ladder.

== Criticism ==
In 2017 the organisation faced allegations of misuse of funds collected for acid attack survivors. Mid-day, a newspaper in India, had revealed how the organisation had collected donations under the pretext of helping the victims, but kept all or most of the money. After the report, the organisation pledged to give the victims their money. Sharma maintained her innocence through all statements given to Mid-day and after further investigation by online media agency, The Logical Indian, it was found that the newspaper's facts did not add up. Sharma subsequently released a statement on her official Facebook handle with evidence of the newspaper's nonfactual reporting. Her post received online support which led to Mid-day wanting to mediate. Sharma's side of the story was then published by the newspaper DNA shedding further light on Mid-day's reporting. In June 2018, the Mumbai police filed a closure report in Sharma's case and exonerated her of all charges. The closure report further confirmed that she was falsely implicated and it is yet to be determined if Sharma will press charges of her own.

== Campaigns ==
=== #EndAcidSale ===
On 30 August 2015, Make Love Not Scars released a series of beauty tutorials calling for a complete ban on the over-the-counter sale of acid. The campaign #EndAcidSale was created in collaboration with the creative agency Ogilvy and Mather. The face of the campaign is acid attack survivor Reshma Qureshi and she is seen giving beauty tips through a series of tutorials on applying eyeliner, lipstick and how to get rid of dark spots.

The videos created for #EndAcidSale guided viewers towards a petition addressed to the Government of India, demanding a complete ban on toilet-cleaning acid and a stronger implementation of the Poisons Act and Poisons Rules. The videos, titled "Beauty Tips by Reshma" went viral and have received over 2 million views to date and the petition garnered over 225,000 signatures within the first two weeks itself. On 8 December 2015, the Supreme Court of India directed Indian states to enforce the ban on over-the-counter sale of acid.

The campaign #EndAcidSale went viral and was covered extensively in Indian and international news. The success of the campaign was featured on The New York Times, The Wall Street Journal, BBC World, MailOnline, ABC News, Time magazine, Mashable, Daily Mirror, People magazine, The Independent, The Huffington Post and by influencers, politicians and celebrities such as Amitabh Bachchan and Ashton Kutcher.

==== Awards ====
The campaign #EndAcidSale was awarded multiple awards for marketing. These include:

- Gold and Innovative Channel Thinking Award at the Warc Asian Prize for Asian Strategy 2016.
