= Paul Lucien Dessau =

British artist (1909–1999)

- Born: 15 September 1909; London, England
- Died: 3 September 1999 (aged 89); Bedford, England
- Education: Hornsey School of Art; Central School of Art and Design
- Known for: Painting, drawing

Paul Lucien Dessau (15 September 1909 – 3 September 1999) was a British artist best known for the paintings he produced during the Second World War whilst serving as a fireman in London.

== Biography ==
=== Early life ===
Paul Dessau was born in London, the third of four children. His father died when he was young and he did not do well at school. On leaving school he joined a commercial art studio as an apprentice, mostly doing catalogue work for department stores. In due course, he left to start his own design studio with his brother Bernard, who was also known as Dewsbury Dessau. Whilst continuing to work, Paul Dessau began to study part-time at the Hornsey School of Art and then took anatomy classes at the Central School of Art and Design and eventually began to show works at various London galleries.

=== World War II ===
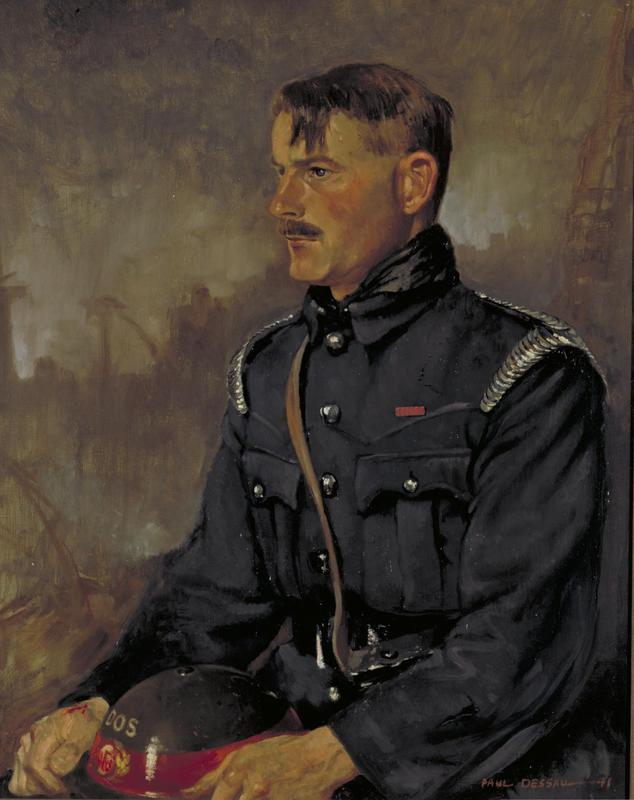
G V Blackstone, GM, London Fire Force (1941) (Art.IWM ART LD 1356)

At the start of the Second World War Paul Dessau, and his brother Bernard, joined the Auxiliary Fire Service, which in 1941 became the National Fire Service. A number of artists had joined the NFS and a firemen artists' committee was formed which included Bernard Hailstone, Leonard Rosoman, Norman Hepple and Robert Coram as well as Dessau. The NFS agreed to assist the artists as long as their fire-fighting duties were not adversely affected and the War Artists' Advisory Committee, WAAC, agreed to consider purchasing any works produced. In time, WAAC were to purchase at least two paintings by Dessau. As well as contributing to both WAAC and specialist civil defence art shows, the firemen held several of their own exhibitions. In 1941, the Firemen Artist Group attracted some 64,000 people in a month to the first of twenty exhibitions they were to hold at the Cooling Galleries. In addition, four firemen artist exhibitions were held at the Royal Academy and then toured around Britain during the war whilst a further two exhibitions toured America and Canada.

Several works by Dessau featured in these wartime exhibitions including And So To Bed, showing a carefully laid-out uniform of an auxiliary fireman, and several fine portraits including one of Divisional Officer Blackstone, who was awarded the George Medal for his actions after a fire station was bombed during the Blitz. Menace is a set of four canvases, now in the London Fire Brigade Museum, entitled Overture, Crescendo, Rallentando and Diminuendo, which show fire-fighters tackling a giant demonic fire figure which towers over them in the first canvas, Overture, but lies defeated in the final Diminuendo. Dessau also contributed illustrations to the 1942 NFS anthology Fire and Water, to the 1943 WAAC booklet Air Raids and to a 1943 book on firemen co-written by Stephen Spender.

=== Later life ===
After the war Dessau and his wife, whom he had married in 1935, moved out of London and settled in the country, where he pursued a career as a successful portrait painter. He was also an accomplished, and largely self-taught, pianist and, less successfully, an inventor of household gadgets.
