= Philip Naviasky =

British painter

Self portrait at 24, Hugh Lane Gallery, Dublin

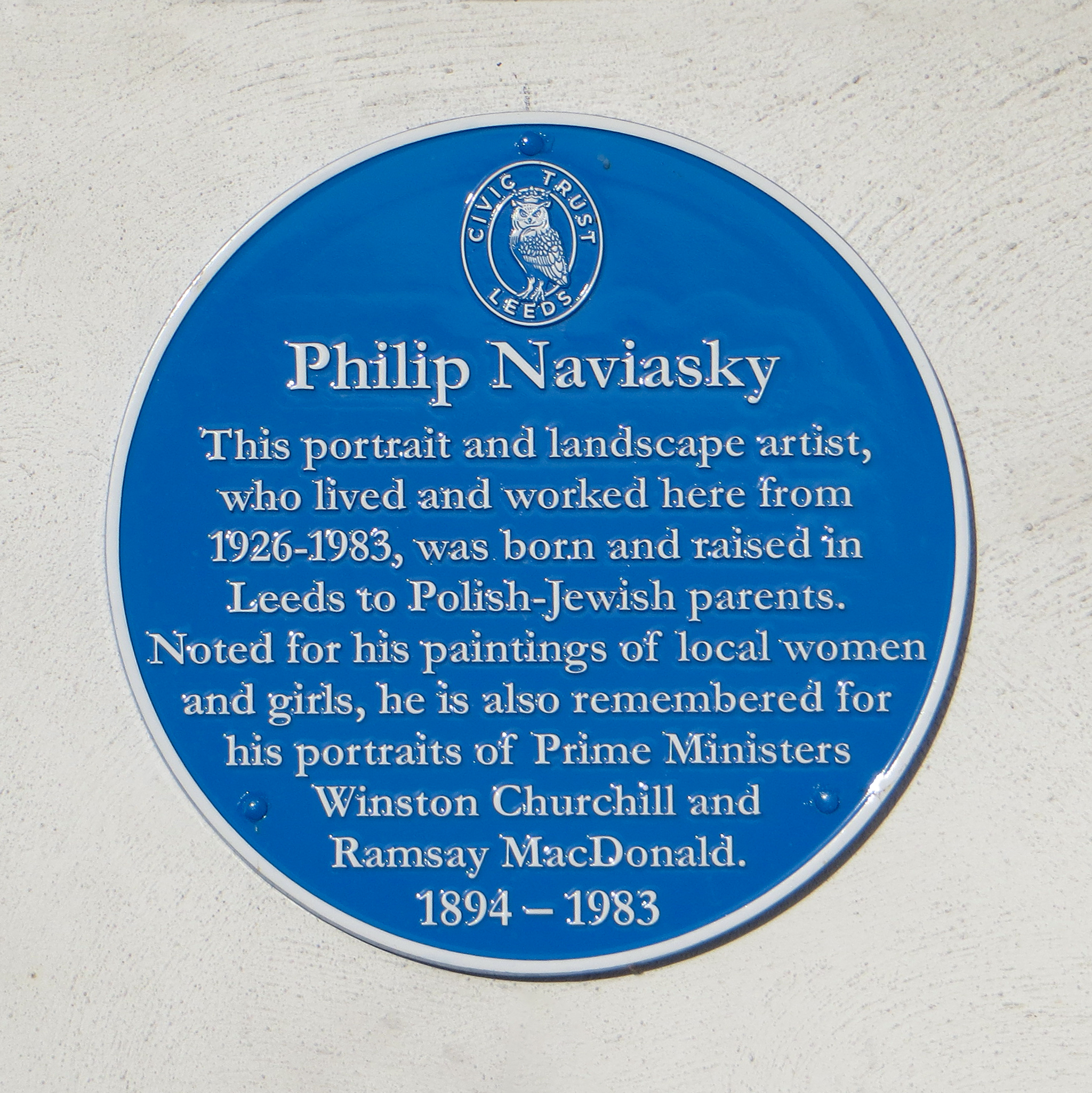
Leeds Civic Trust plaque

Philip Naviasky (14 January 1894 – 19 June 1983) was an English artist based in Leeds. He worked in watercolour and oil painting, painting many portraits, as well as still lifes and some landscapes.

Born in Leeds to Polish-Jewish immigrant parents Barnet Naviasky (born Berel Neviazhsky) and Fanny (née Levinson), he won a scholarship to the Leeds School of Fine Arts in 1907. Among his contempories there was Jacob Kramer; both remained friends and fixtures in the Leeds art scene for decades. The Leeds Arts Club was an important radical presence in the city's cultural life in the period. In 1912, he was the youngest ever student accepted into the Royal Academy school in London. He went on to win a Royal Exhibition award and to study at the Royal College of Art, after which he mostly spent his career in Leeds as an artist and art teacher at Leeds College of Art.

In 1917-18 he spent time in Dublin; the Hugh Lane Gallery has a self-portrait and another portrait, both of 1918, as well as genre figures painted under the name of Sidney Davies.

After his marriage to Millicent Astrinsky, a Leeds dressmaker and rabbi's daughter (and amateur painter), the couple travelled in Europe for two years before returning to Leeds. On his return in 1938 he had a show of paintings done in Marseille and elsewhere in a local gallery, and provoked headlines with an interview in a local paper (the Leeds Mercury) criticising the lack of interest and support in Leeds for local art.

He travelled abroad, mostly around the Mediterranean, in the summers, and left many paintings and drawing of the people and places of the region. There are also subjects from Ireland and Mexico. Apart from his paintings of Leeds notables and their families, there are paintings of rabbis and drawings of babies, many of his daughter Sonia (later a still life painter herself). His still lifes of vases of flowers and sometimes fruit remain popular with collectors. Exhibitions included a one-man show at the Harris Museum, in Preston, Lancashire, in 1932-3, and an exhibition of his portraits at the Rug Collection Gallery in Leeds in 2002. He also often exhibited at the ROI, RSA and Royal Academy of Arts. He was active in the Yorkshire Union of Artists and its successor from 1922, the Society of Yorkshire Artists.

Failing eyesight made him stop painting in the late 1960s. In 2024, Philip Naviasky was awarded a blue plaque by Leeds Civic Trust, placed on 579 Scotthall Road Leeds LS7 2NF, where he lived from 1926 until his death.

His works are in many UK museums, especially in the North, with the largest collections in Leeds (art gallery and university) and Whitby.
