= Leonard Rosoman =

British painter

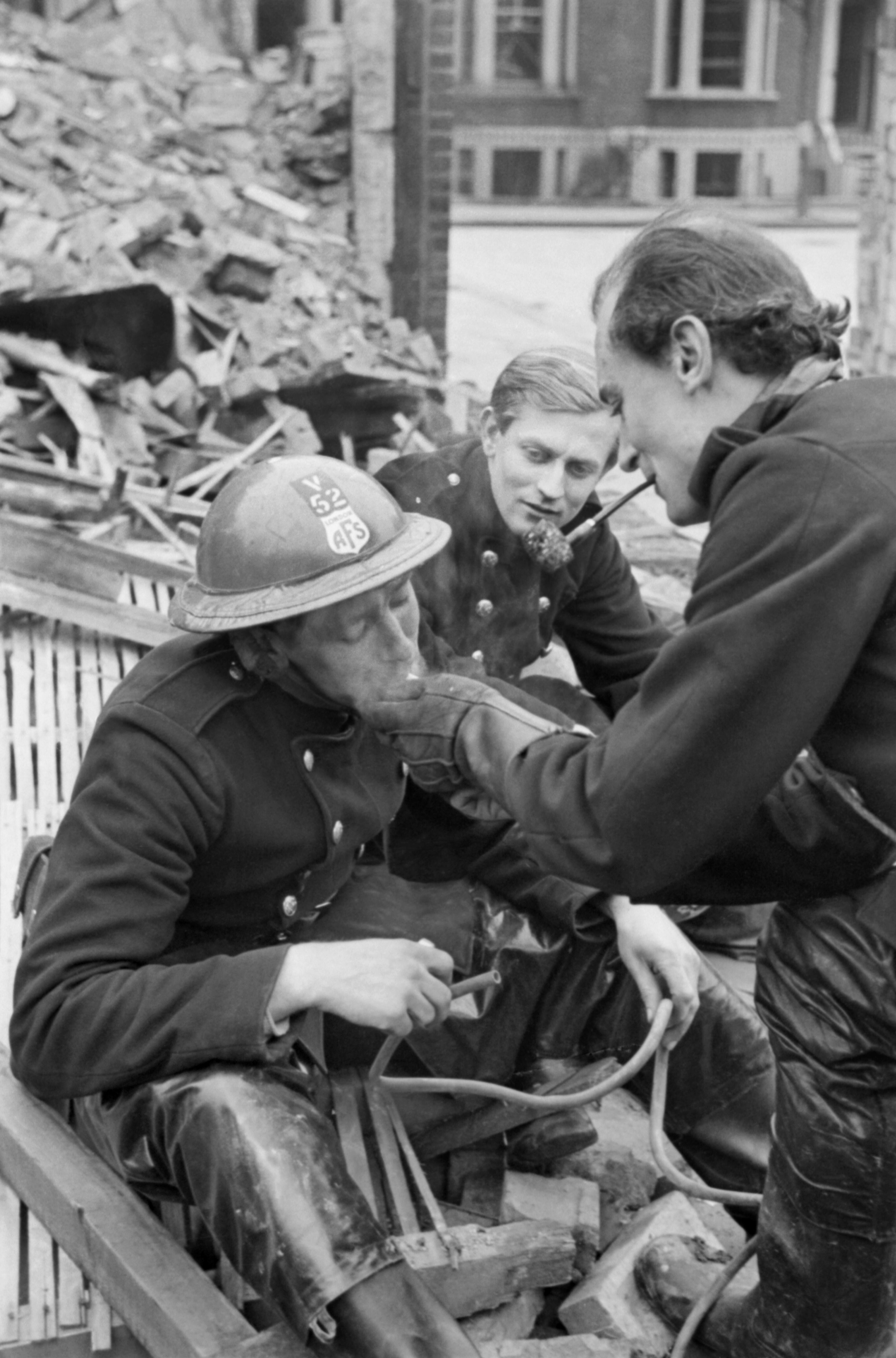
- Men of the Auxiliary Fire Service in London, c.1940: Left to right, Auxiliary Firemen Bernard Hailstone, Leonard Rosoman and Richard Southern.
- Born: Leonard Rosoman; 27 October 1913; London, England
- Died: 21 February 2012 (aged 98)
- Education: King Edward VII School of Art; Royal Academy Schools; Central School of Art
- Known for: Drawing, painting

Leonard Rosoman OBE RA (27 October 1913 – 21 February 2012) was a British artist.

== Early life ==
Rosoman was born in London and educated at the Deacon's school, Peterborough, and then at the King Edward VII school of art in Newcastle upon Tyne, under E.M.O'R. Dickey in 1930–4, at the Royal Academy Schools in 1935–6 and at the Central School under Bernard Meninsky in 1937–8.

His first major break came in 1937, with a commission to illustrate My Friend Mr Leakey, a children's book by the scientist JBS Haldane. From 1938 he ran life classes at the Reinmann school, the London branch of a Berlin art college.

== World War II ==
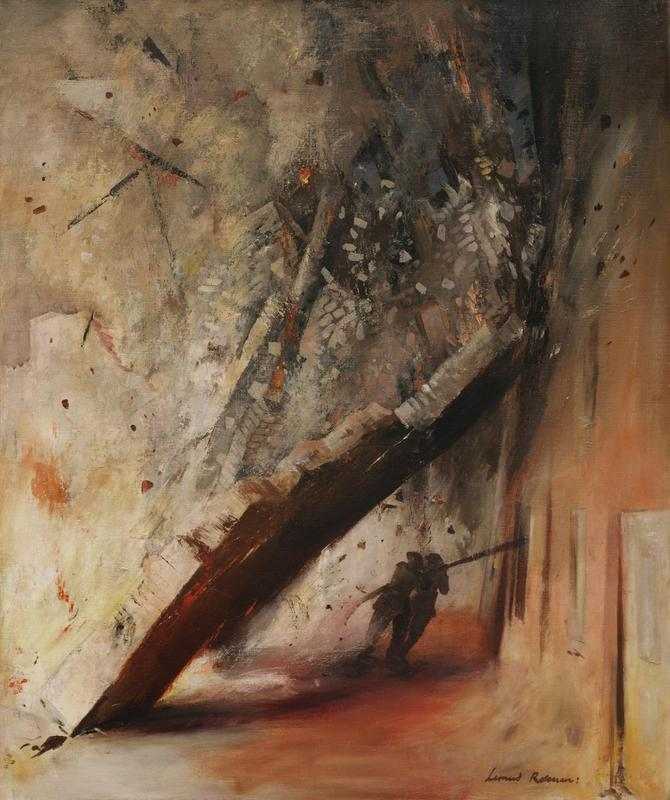
A House Collapsing on Two Firemen, Shoe Lane, London, EC4,(Art.IWM ART LD 1353)

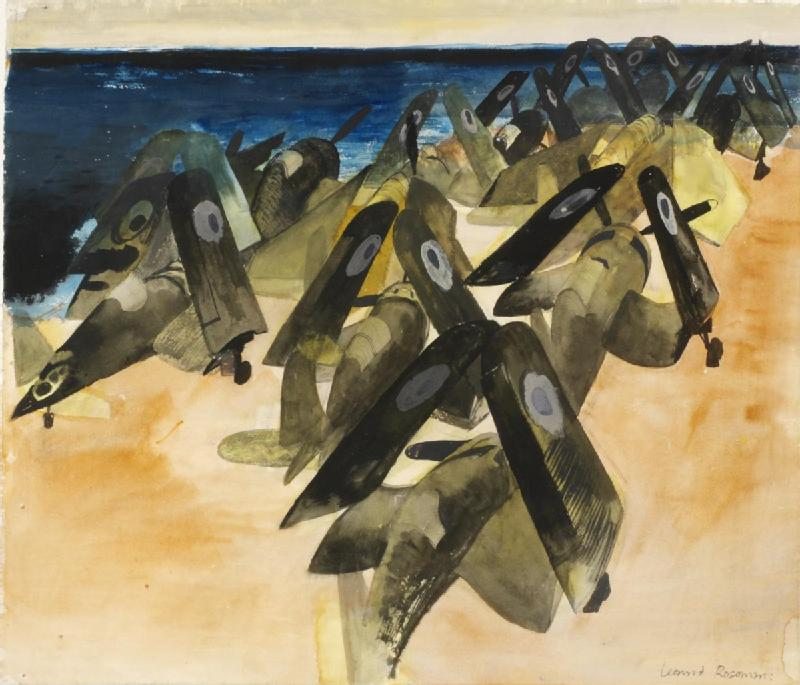
A Black Aeroplane on a Red Deck, Aircraft massed on the Flight Deck of HMS Formidable. (Art.IWM ART LD 5631)

At the beginning of the Second World War Rosoman joined the Auxiliary Fire Service, which in 1941 became the National Fire Service, and began making paintings based on his experiences as a fire-fighter during the Battle of Britain and the Blitz in London. One of these, A House Collapsing on Two Firemen, Shoe Lane, London, EC4 (1941), now in the Imperial War Museum, shows the incident on the night of 29/30 December 1940 in which a young fireman who had just relieved Rosoman at his position was killed by a collapsing building in the City of London. Whilst the other fireman, the author William Sansom, survived, the scene haunted Rosoman and he re-worked the painting several times. Rosoman sometimes called his work, The Falling Wall. It was completed in August 1941. The painting was shown in the Firemen Artists exhibition at the Royal Academy in 1941.

A number of artists had joined the NFS and an firemen artists' committee had been formed which included Bernard Hailstone, Paul Lucien Dessau, Norman Hepple and Robert Coram as well as Rosoman. As well as contributing to both War Artists' Advisory Committee, WAAC, and specialist civil defence art shows, the firemen held several of their own exhibitions.

In 1943 Rosoman was seconded to the War Office to illustrate books on fire-fighting, and in April 1945 was appointed, by the War Artists' Advisory Committee, to a full-time salaried position, along with James Morris, to document the activities of the British Pacific Fleet. Commissioned as a captain in the Royal Marines, he was posted to the Far East. He joined the aircraft carrier HMS Formidable in Sydney in May 1945 and sailed with her for three months before returning to Sydney to work his on-board sketches into finished paintings. On board Formidable he became fascinated by the new technologies he encountered there, "I've become interested in all sorts of strange devices like radar indicators, pom-poms and planes with wings that fold up like a moth's". He travelled to Hong Kong in September 1945 to record bomb damage and although he reached the coast of Japan he did not go ashore there.

== Later life ==
On his return to Britain, Rosoman taught at Camberwell College of Art for a while before moving to Edinburgh College of Art in 1948 to teach mural painting. He organised a famous exhibition for Sergei Diaghilev at the Edinburgh festival of 1954 and, with the help of students, made a large mural at the art college, where the exhibit was held. This exhibition was later shown in London. In 1956 he moved on to the Chelsea School of Art, and the following year to the Royal College of Art, where David Hockney was one of his students.

In 1951 Rosoman painted a mural for the Festival of Britain on the South Bank in London and drew his first illustrations for the Radio Times. In 1958 he did the murals for the British Pavilion at the Brussels International Exhibition.

Rosoman was elected an associate of the Royal Academy in 1960 and Academician in 1969. He painted a mural at the restaurant in the Academy's home, Burlington House, depicting scenes of life within and around the building.

In 1988 he painted the vault of the Archbishop's chapel at Lambeth Palace, with scenes from the history of the church in England: Pope Gregory commissioning St Augustine of Canterbury to Christianise Britain, murder of Thomas à Becket, Lollards attacking Lambeth Palace, Archbishop Laud compiling his prayer book, Matthew Parker, representative figures of General Synod and the Anglican Communion and a Christ Pantocrator.

A retrospective exhibition of Rosoman's war art was held at the Imperial War Museum in 1989, before being shown in Edinburgh in 1990.. Rossoman received the OBE in 1981. He was married twice.
