= Jocelyn Horner =

British sculptor

- Born: 1902; Halifax, West Yorkshire
- Died: 1972 (aged 69–70); Halifax, West Yorkshire
- Education: Leeds School of Art
- Known for: Sculpture

Jocelyn Horner (1902 – January 1973) was a British sculptor and teacher.

== Biography ==
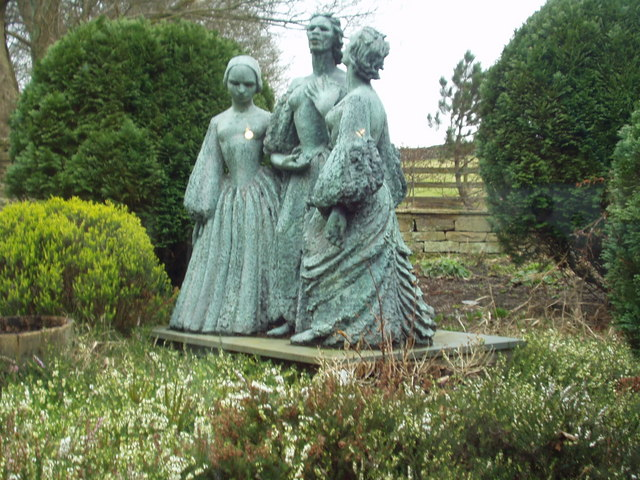
Brontë Sisters statue, Haworth Parsonage Museum

Horner was born at Green Hayes in Halifax, West Yorkshire, where she spent most of her life. She attended Halifax High School and Grovelly Manor in Bournemouth. In 1920 she enrolled at the Leeds School of Art to train as a sculptor and was a student alongside both Barbara Hepworth and Henry Moore. While still a student she began a series of animal studies and children's portraits. During World War II she worked as a home teacher for blind people in Halifax and also served as a Red Cross nurse. When the War ended she returned to Leeds as a student and in the early 1950s took a number of part-time teaching posts. Horner taught modelling and wood carving at Percival Whitley College and also taught at Halifax Art College.

In the 1960s Horner's work, which was greatly influenced by that of Jacob Epstein was exhibited both locally in Yorkshire and at national venues. She won the Leeds Gold Medal for Yorkshire artists in 1951 and had a number of high-profile commissions. These included a bronze group sculpture of the three Brontë sisters for the Bronte Parsonage Museum and a bust and hands sculpture of Sir John Barbirolli for the Hallé Concert Society in Manchester. Her Head of a Blind Man is held at the London Headquarters of the Royal National Institute of Blind People.

Leeds City Art Gallery holds examples of her work and a memorial show was held at the Stable Court Galleries at Temple Newsam near Leeds. In 2013 a Blue Plaque was unveiled on the house in Green Hayes where Horner was born and died.
