= Reshma Qureshi =

Indian model, vlogger and anti-acid activist

- Born: Reshma Bano Qureshi
- Occupation: Model
- Years active: 2016 - present
- Modeling information
- Hair color: Black

Reshma Qureshi is an Indian model, vlogger, and anti-acid activist. Her foray into modeling in the United States came when she walked the catwalk for Archana Kochhar at the 2016 New York Fashion Week.

== Early life and attack ==
Qureshi was born the youngest daughter of a taxi driver from Eastern Mumbai, India. They lived in a two bedroom apartment that housed all ten members of the family. She studied commerce at school.

On 19 May 2014, at the age of seventeen, Qureshi was attacked with sulfuric acid by her estranged brother-in-law and two other assailants when she was traveling to the city of Allahabad for an Alim exam. The attack was actually aimed at her sister Gulshan, but Qureshi was mistaken for her. While the two other assailants were never captured after the attack, her brother-in-law was arrested.

After the attack, she felt suicidal for a short period of time as she was left scarred on her face and arms and lost one of her eyes completely. After healing, Qureshi became the face of the Make Love Not Scars campaign, which aims to give "a voice to those who have been assaulted" by acid attacks and campaigns for the end of the sale of acid in India. She also began making beauty tutorials online as a way to campaign against the sale of acid. Cosmopolitan called the videos "ridiculously empowering".

In an interview with India New England News in September 2017, Qureshi was asked if she had heard from her attacker. She stated, "I haven’t spoken to the attacker or his family as such, but I met him two months back in court. I instinctively wanted to rip his throat out, to be honest… When he saw me, he told his lawyer and people, "She has become so big and a model, she is in a good place, so please release me or help me out.""

== Modeling ==
Qureshi is the face of the Brave Souls Foundation campaign in India. The New York Times reported that as of September 2015, her videos have garnered over 900,000 views.

For the 2016 New York Fashion Week, she opened for Indian designer Archana Kochhar and wore a "stunning cream and floral floor-length gown". Qureshi's makeup was done by Chika Chan and her hair by Aubrey Loots. Of the experience, Qureshi stated, "This walk was important to me because there are so many girls like me who are survivors of acid attacks, and this will give them courage. And it will also go to show people who judge people based on their appearance that you shouldn't judge a book by its cover - you should look at everyone though the same eyes."

Also at the 2016 NYFW she walked for Vaishali Couture.

In September 2017, Qureshi walked for designer Jaheena at the Crocs Mysore Fashion Week, held in Mysore, India.

== See also ==
- Acid throwing
