= John Armleder =

Swiss performance artist, painter, sculptor, critic, and curator

John M. Armleder
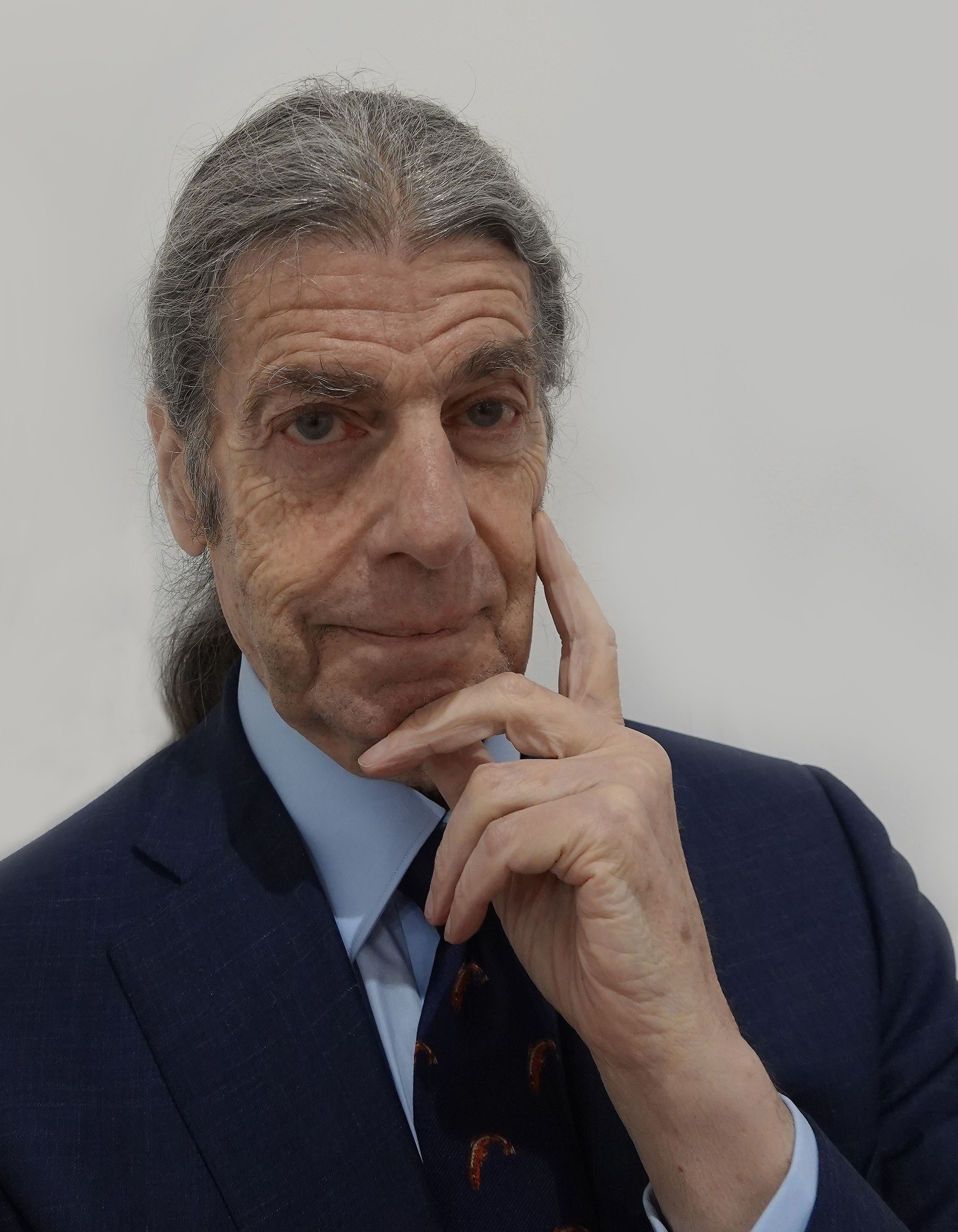
- Born: 1948 (age 77–78); Geneva, Switzerland
- Known for: furniture sculptures, paintings, curatorial projects
- Movement: Fluxus, Groupe Ecart

John Armleder (born 1948) is a Swiss performance artist, painter, sculptor, critic, and curator. His work is based on his involvement with Fluxus in the 1960s and 1970s, when he created performance art pieces, installations, and collective art activities that were strongly influenced by John Cage. However, Armleder's position throughout his career has been to avoid associating his artistic practice with any type of manifesto.

== Early life and education ==
Armleder was born in Geneva, as the son of a hotelier (owners of Le Richemond). He studied at the École Supérieure des Beaux-Arts, Genève (1966–67), and at the Barry Summer School at Glamorgan College of Education in Barry, Wales (1969).

== Work ==
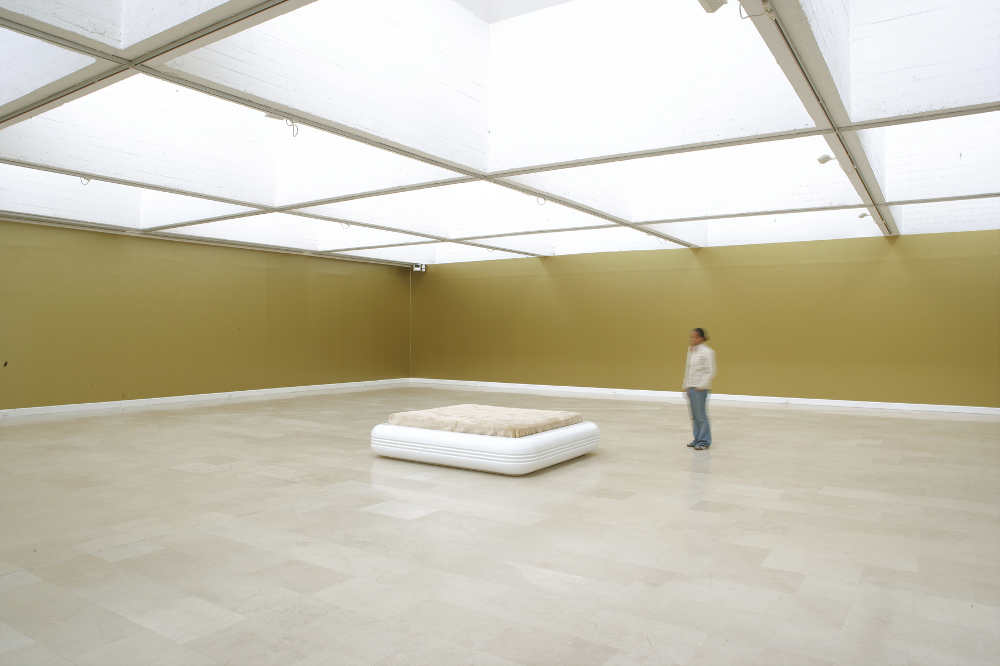
Furniture sculpture (2007) by John Armleder, at Villa Arson, Nice, France

In 1969, with Patrick Lucchini and Claude Rychner, Armleder founded the Groupe Ecart in Geneva, from which stemmed the Galerie Ecart and its associated performance group and publications. The Groupe Ecart was particularly important in Europe during the 1970s and 1980s, not only through its activity as an independent publishing house, but also because it introduced in Switzerland—and sometimes in Europe—a large number of notable artists, including Joseph Beuys and Andy Warhol. Armleder was later associated with the Neo-Geo artistic movement in the 1980s.

Armleder frequently examines the context in which art is displayed and views the exhibition as a medium in its own right. Since the 1990s, he has created installations, paintings, wall paintings, sculptures and what he calls Furniture Sculptures—installations that usually juxtapose furniture with monochrome or abstract paintings, either literally on the furniture or a canvas hanging nearby. His work has varied greatly in form, and has, since the beginning, used chance as a method of producing the final forms that pieces take, much like John Cage. He often uses a dense scenographic hanging style, putting individual works into proximity and creating installation-like exhibitions.

== Exhibitions ==
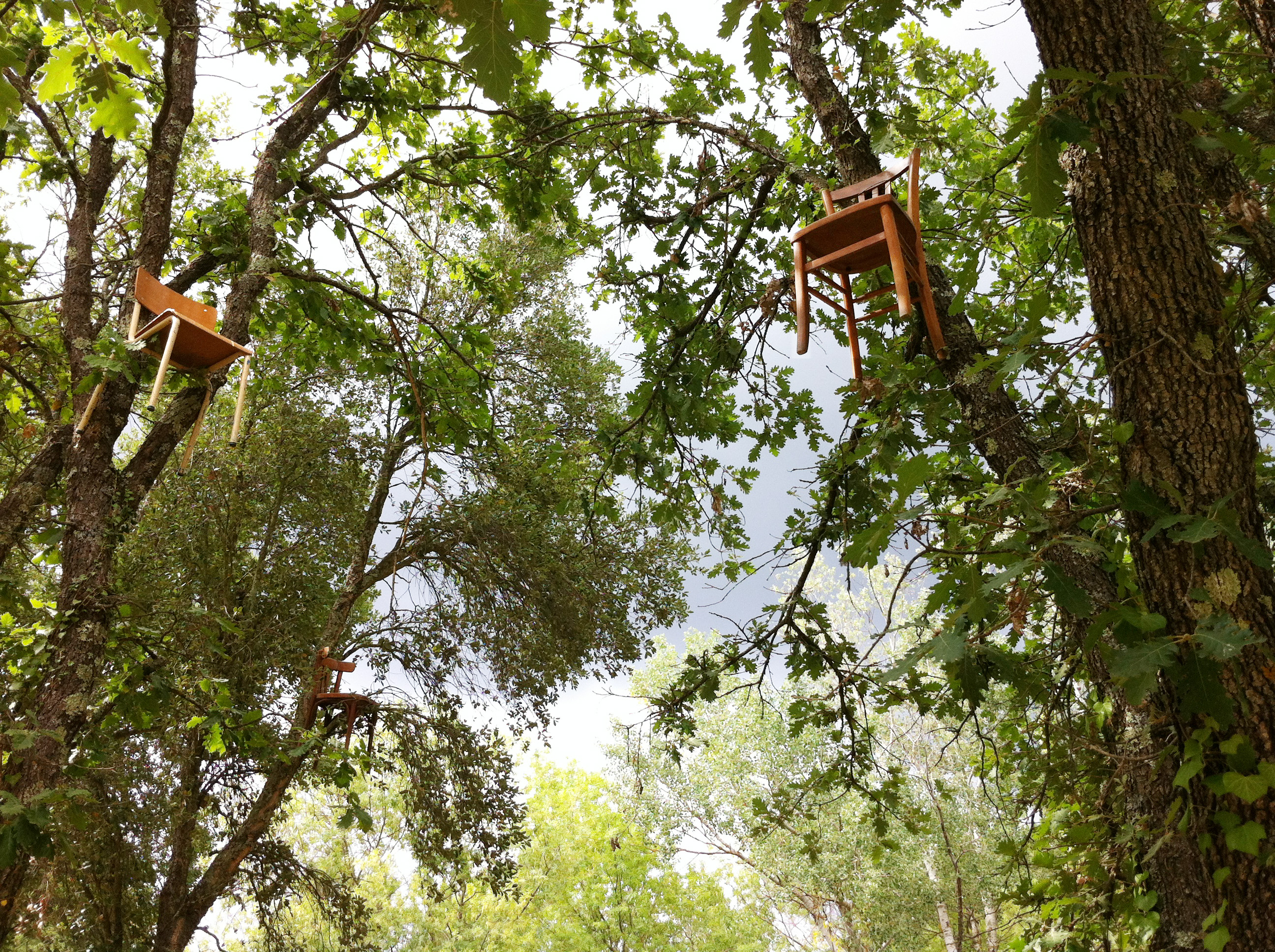
Untitled (chairs), 1984/2014, Domaine du Muy, France

In 1986, Armleder represented Switzerland at the Venice Biennale. In 2004, a retrospective exhibition of his works on paper was shown at the Kunsthalle Zürich, Switzerland, and later traveled to the ICA in Philadelphia. In the winter of 2006–2007, a large exhibition including works from all eras of his career was shown at the Museum of Modern and Contemporary Art (Mamco) in Geneva. In April 2013, Armleder had a solo show at the Dairy Art Centre in London.

== Collections ==
Armleder's work is held in the permanent collections of numerous museums including the Musée cantonal des Beaux-Arts, Lausanne, the Staedel Museum, the Museum of Modern Art, New York, KANAL - Centre Pompidou, Brussels, among other institutions.
