= Dairy Art Centre =

British art gallery, closed in 2014

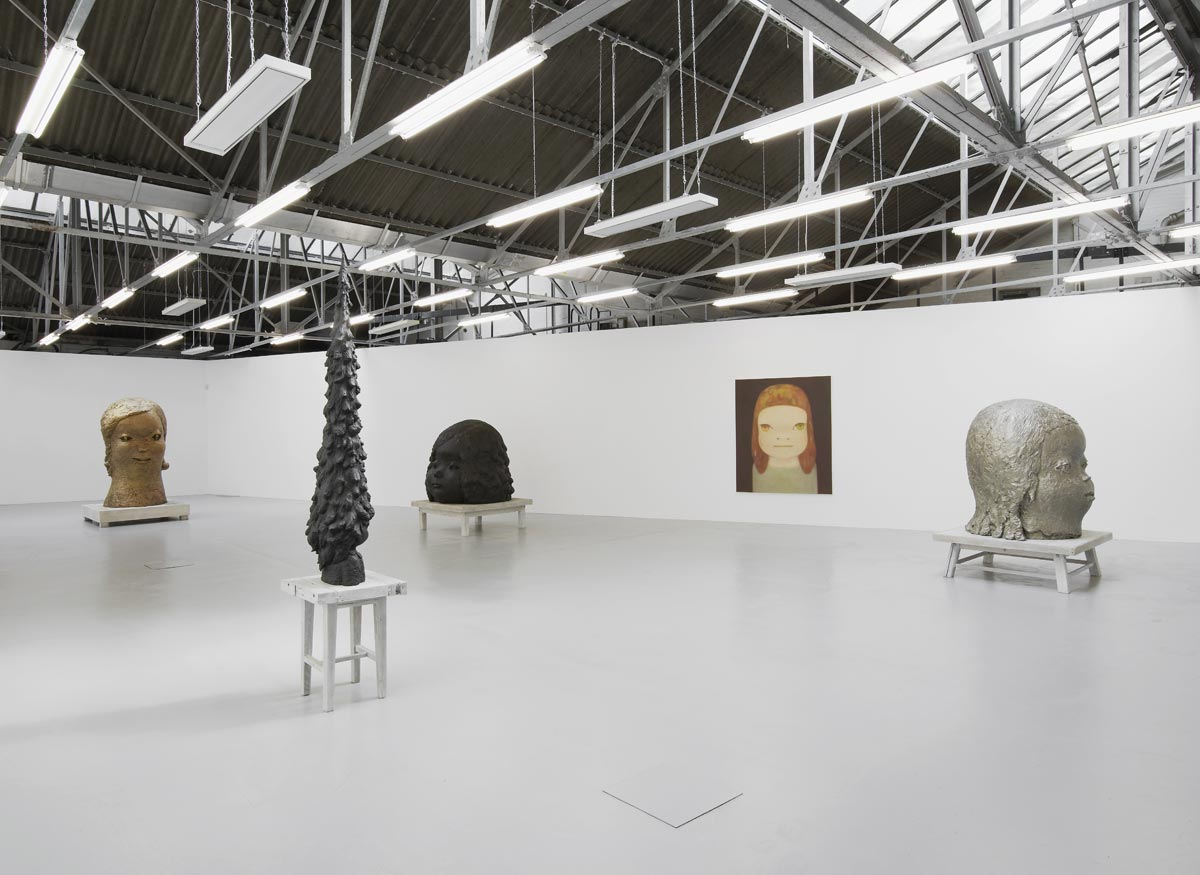

- Location within Central London
- Established: 2013
- Dissolved: 7 December 2014
- Location: Dairy Art Centre, 7a Wakefield Street, London WC1N, England, United Kingdom
- Coordinates: 51.526012°N 0.122019°W
- Public transit access: Russell Square
- Website: dairyartcentre.org.uk

Dairy Art Centre was an art gallery in the premises of a former dairy in London founded in 2013 by Frank Cohen and Nicolai Frahm which exhibited work from their personal collections, as well as from other institutions. It was also used a venue to hire for events.

Dairy Art Centre's inaugural exhibition in early 2013 was called Quicksand by John Armleder.

In 2014, Julian Schnabel presented Every Angel has a Dark Side, his first solo exhibition in a public art space in the UK for nearly 15 years. Schnabel's exhibition was panned by local art critics, with The Guardian calling it "colossally bad" and The Daily Telegraph describing it as "irrefutably awful".

The gallery ceased its activities later that year on 7 December 2014.
