= Ria Sharma =

Indian anti-acid activist

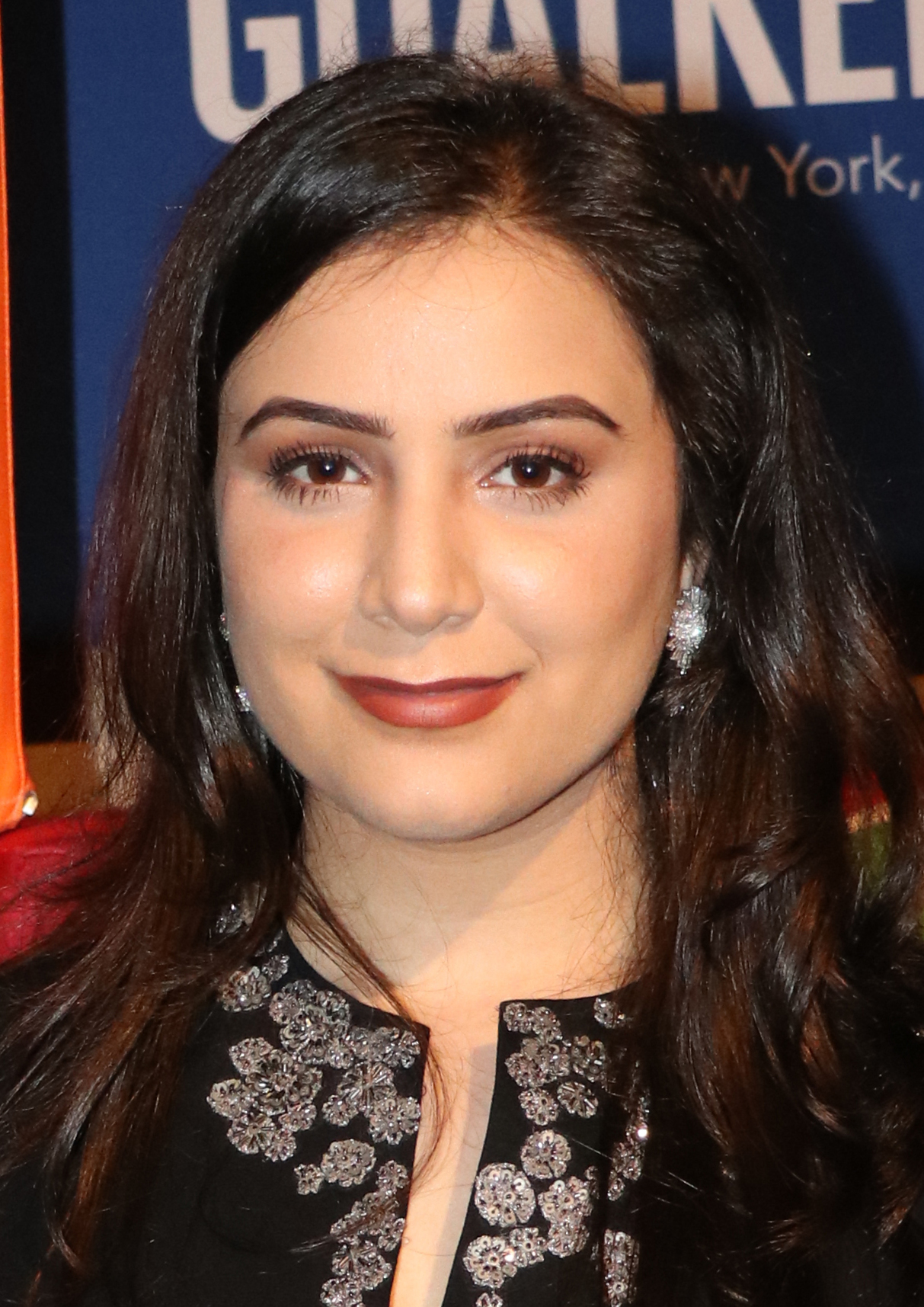
- Ria Sharma, in 2017
- Born: 13 October 1992 (age 33); Dahanu, Maharashtra
- Occupation: Social Activist
- Awards: Global Goals Awards, 2017

Ria Sharma is a social activist and the first Indian to receive the UNICEF Global Goals Awards for 2017.

Sharma is the founder of NGO Make Love Not Scars that works in all aspects of rehabilitation for acid attack survivors in India.

Sharma also founded the world's first rehabilitation centre for acid attack survivors in the world.

== Early life and education ==
Sharma was born in 1992 and grew up in New Delhi. She completed her schooling from Pathways World School in Haryana. She graduated from the Leeds College of Art, UK. As a part of her curriculum, she returned to India to make a documentary on acid attack survivors in 2014 at the age of 21.

== Scars ==
In 2014, Sharma founded Make Love Not Scars (MLNS) to support acid attack victims who are mostly women. It actively supports survivors of acid attacks physically and mentally. This is a crowd funded organization where the team organizes campaigns and reach out to volunteers and funders online through social media platform. The organization helps the survivors get jobs to support their families. Sharma made a statement to support acid attack survivors by starting her career by not wearing makeup for a year to stand in solidarity with the acid attack survivors.

She founded India's first rehabilitation center for survivors of acid attacks. MLNS also provides a platform for the survivors to interact with employers and get hired. They display their talents and skills on the portal, and urge organisations to find a suitable employee.

End Acid Sale, a campaign that was started by the organization in mid 2015 aimed at putting a ban on retail sale of acids. The campaign created awareness and a petition drive was launched to help support the cause. The campaign gained global support and became one of India most awarded campaigns. End Acid Sale made history by being the first Indian campaign in 7 years to win the Cannes Gold Lion in Film

In April 2015, The Supreme Court made it mandatory for both private and government hospitals across the country to provide full and free medical treatment to the victims. The treatment would include reconstructive surgery, medicines, accommodation, rehabilitation and aftercare. The government also increased the compensation to 3 lac INR per victim. Till date, 5 victims have been able to receive free treatment under the new guidelines by the government.

== Awards ==
In 2017, Sharma was the first Indian to be awarded the United Nations Goalkeepers Global Award. The award recognizes an individual who has made extraordinary efforts to lead a campaign, group or movement that has served to protect and better the lives of women and girls in a region, country or globally. Make Love Not Scars has been able to create a sustainable growth and momentum with the infrastructure to expand and evolve.

In 2016, Sharma was awarded the British Council's Social Impact Award, for creating a positive social change and improving the life of others.

In 2017, Sharma was awarded the India Today Woman Of The Year for Public Service.

In 2017, under Sharma's leadership Make Love Not Scars was awarded The CNBC TV18 India Business Leader Award(IBLA) under the category "Brand Of The Year".
