= James Morris (artist) =

British war artist (1908–1989)

James Morris (1908–1989) was a British war artist during the Second World War.

== Biography ==
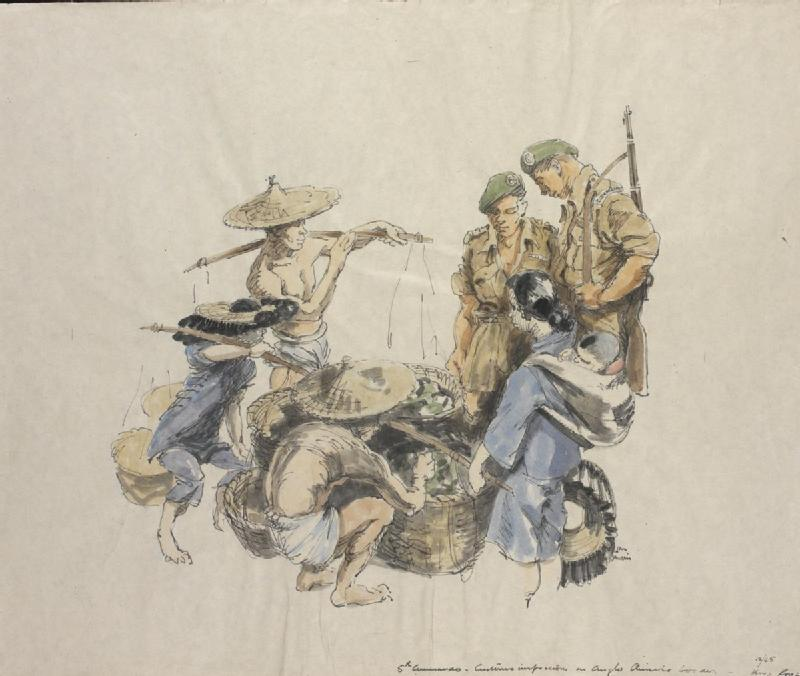
5th Commando - Custom Inspection on the Anglo-Chinese Frontier, Hong Kong, 1945 (Art. IWM ARTLD 5817)

Morris worked as a miner in South Wales until 1929, when he moved to London, where he worked as a designer throughout the 1930s, including a spell as an interior designer for Harrods. At the start of World War Two, he worked in civil defence for a brief period before joining the Royal Navy as a signaller. Morris served on Arctic convoy ships, including one that was shelled by the Tirpitz. He sold drawings and a sketchbook depicting his experiences in Archangel and Murmansk to the War Artists' Advisory Committee, WAAC. In 1945, whilst still serving in the Navy, WAAC approved a full-time salaried contract for Morris, to record the work in the Far East of the British Pacific Fleet, alongside Leonard Rosoman. He worked in Rangoon after liberation, in Hong Kong, Formosa, Shanghai, Tokyo and Yokohama, making him the only full-time WAAC artist to reach China and Japan. He recorded naval scenes aboard HMS Belfast and HMS Argonaut, cityscapes and war damage including works showing areas of Yokohama that had been extensively bombed. He recorded the interior of the imperial Diet in Tokyo and the post-war celebrations in Shanghai.
