= Laetitia Yhap =

British artist

Laetitia Yhap (born 1 May 1941) is an English artist, best known for intricate paintings of fishermen on Stade Beach in Hastings and for not painting on traditional canvas. She is of Chinese and Austrian heritage.

== Family and education ==
Yhap was born on 1 May 1941 in the city of St Albans, Hertfordshire. Her father was Leshe Neville Yhap, a Chinese medical student, and her mother was Elizabeth Yhap (née Kogler), an Austrian World War II refugee.

Yhap studied at the Camberwell School of Art and the Slade School of Art. She was awarded a Leverhulme Travel Scholarship which she used to travel to Italy to research renaissance art and architecture. She also studied Chinese calligraphy for four years.

She moved to Hasting, Sussex, in 1967.

== Career ==
After graduating, Yhap first painted in an abstract style. She submitted a painting to an open exhibition called Young Contemporaries, and was referenced in an art critics review for The Daily Telegraph. Her first solo exhibition was held at the Piccadilly Gallery in London in 1968.

Yhap is best known for intricate paintings of the beach landscape and working fishermen on Stade Beach in Hastings, which she began painting in 1974. Her work is never painted on traditional canvas, as "I disliked canvas and the way its weave affected the brush stroke." Her surfaces instead incorporate driftwood and rope. Yhap is also known for portraiture.

Her work is held in the permanent collections of the Hastings Museum and Art Gallery, the Tate Gallery, the British Council and the New Hall Art Collection at the University of Cambridge.

Retrospective exhibitions of her work have been held in England and China. In 2020, the Yanlan Arts and Culture Foundation in Beijing, China, hosted Laetitia Yhap: Longings and Belonging. In 2021, Hastings Museum and Art Gallery hosted the exhibition My Vital Life – Laetitia Yhap at 80, in celebration of the life, work and eightieth birthday.

== Personal life ==
Yhap's partner was Michael Rycroft and they had a son, Ajax. She was previously married to the painter Jeffrey Camp RA.
