= James Bateman (artist) =

English painter and engraver

- Bateman in 1935
- Born: 22 March 1893; Kendal, England
- Died: 2 August 1959 (aged 66); London, England
- Education: Leeds School of Art; Slade School of Fine Art
- Known for: Painting, engraving

James Bateman RA (22 March 1893 – 2 August 1959) was an English painter and engraver specialising in agricultural topics, rural subjects and pastoral landscapes.

== Life and work ==
Bateman was born in Kendal, the son of a blacksmith. During World War One he served with the Northumberland Fusiliers, the Machine Gun Corps and, from 1916, with the Artists Rifles. Although he had studied sculpture at Leeds School of Art from 1910 to 1914, and won a scholarship to the Royal College of Art, a serious war-time injury caused by a gunshot wound to the spine and lungs, led him to concentrate on painting, as it would be less physically demanding. Bateman studied at the Slade School of Art between 1919 and 1921, and was a Rome Scholarship finalist in 1920. After the Slade, Bateman taught art, first at the Cheltenham Art College, then the Hammersmith School of Art and, in 1929, at Goldsmiths College. He exhibited at the Royal Academy from 1924 onwards and was made a full member of the Academy in 1942. He was also a member of the New English Art Club, the Cheltenham Group and the Cotswold Group.

At the start of the Second World War Bateman worked as a Camouflage Officer at the Civil Defence Camouflage Establishment for the Ministry of Home Security in Leamington Spa. He was unhappy with the work and resigned, in March 1940, when offered a commission for four paintings on land work subjects by the War Artists' Advisory Committee. For the commission he visited farms in Cambridge, St. Albans and Reading and he completed three pictures, including one on the Women's Land Army, and was offered a further commission for two production subjects at Shoeburyness but he declined due to other commitments and the commission went to Kenneth Rowntree.

After the war Bateman continued painting and teaching. In 1948 he was elected an Associate member of the Royal Watercolour Society. He painted a number of boxing scenes and portraits of boxers including one of Freddie Mills in 1951. In 1957 Bateman wrote Oil Painting, part of the How to do it series published by The Studio. He also began to experiment with new subjects, most notably Ancient Greek myths. He died in London from a combination of liver failure and pneumonia in 1959.

Works by Bateman are held in the Tate, the Laing Art Gallery and the Cheltenham Art Gallery & Museum.
