= Frank Cohen =

British businessman and art collector (born 1943)

- Born: 15 October 1943 (age 82)
- Known for: Initial Access; Dairy Art Centre; Fortnum X Frank
- Spouse: Cherryl Garson (married 1972)
- Children: 2
- Website: http://initialaccess.co.uk

Frank Cohen (born 15 October 1943) is a British businessman and art collector. He is frequently referred to as "the Saatchi of the North", in reference to the more famous art dealer Charles Saatchi.

He was born and raised in Manchester, where he worked in market stalls before building up the ‘Home Improvement Company’ and then ‘GlynWebb Home Improvement Stores’, a large chain of Do It Yourself (DIY) stores in the north of the United Kingdom.

Cohen began collecting art in the 1970s and, upon selling his business in 1997, it became his full-time occupation.

He also co-founded the Dairy Art Centre with Nicolai Frahm in 2013, a contemporary art gallery which closed in late 2014.

On 13 September 2016 Fortnum & Mason opened "Fortnum X Frank", an installation throughout the store of more than 60 Modern British and Contemporary works loaned from Cohen's collection.

In 2017, The Daily Telegraph reported that an auction of works in Australia in that year from an anonymous British collector was in fact from the collection of Cohen. The sale was expected to bring in approximately £5m and the Telegraph quoted Cohen as saying he would "probably lose money" on the sale.

In 2018, Cohen appeared in Sky Arts The Art of Collecting, National Treasures (Season 1 Episode 4).
