= Archana Kochhar =

Indian fashion designer (born 1972)

- Born: 1972 (age 53–54); India
- Occupation: Fashion designer
- Label: Archana Kochhar

Archana Kochhar (born 1972) is an Indian fashion designer. She is mainly known for her global design sensibilities.

Archana Kochhar has been invited to showcase her collection on National & International runways. Kochhar has showcased her designs at events like Lakme Fashion Week, India Fashion Week and New York Fashion Week.

Archana exhibited Make in India driven Ahimsa silk saree with an objective to generate employment in weaving community for Women Empowerment at Satya Brahma's initiative at Indian Affairs 6th Annual India Leadership Conclave 2015 in Mumbai.

== New York Fashion Week ==
As a part of Prime Minister Narendra Modi's Make in India campaign, Kochhar's collection introduced the indigenous ahimsa silk (Peace Silk) at New York Fashion Week, 2015. Her designs were featured by amputee model Rebekah Marine.
