= Walter Westley Russell =

British painter (1867–1949)

Sir Walter Westley Russell
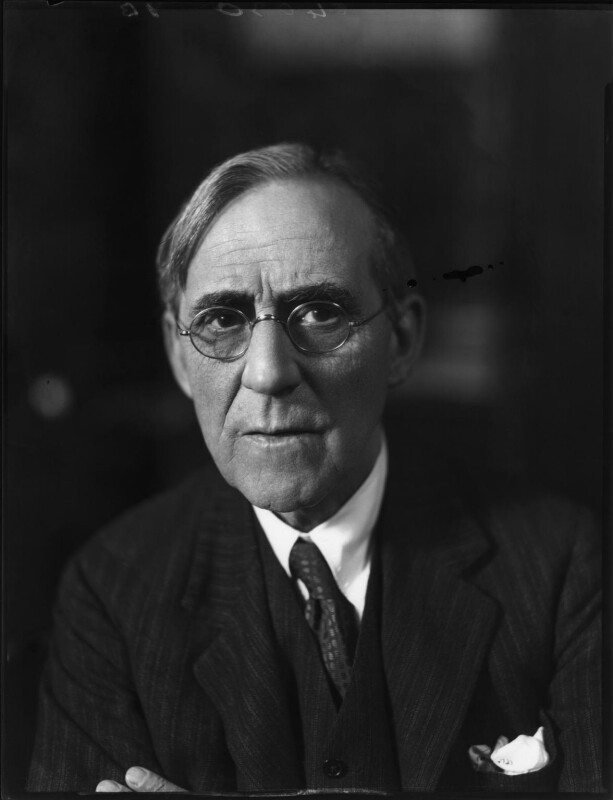
- Russell in 1938
- Born: 31 May 1867; Forest Gate, Essex, England
- Died: 14 April 1949 (aged 81); Kensington, London, England
- Movement: Painter

Sir Walter Westley Russell CVO RA (31 May 1867 – 16 April 1949) was a British painter and art teacher. He became a member of the Royal Academy of Arts in 1926 and served as Keeper of the Royal Academy Schools from 1927 to 1942.

== Life and career ==
Russell was born in Forest Gate, Essex, in 1867 and studied at the Westminster School of Art under Professor Frederick Brown. He exhibited five works at the Royal Academy between 1891 and 1904, including The Pierrots, Tea Time and a portrait. He exhibited at New English Art Club from 1893.

He was a teacher and then Assistant Professor at the Slade School of Fine Art between 1895 and 1927. As a landscape painter he worked mainly in Yorkshire, Norfolk and Sussex. He also painted portraits and genre pictures. He was one of 150 artists chosen to represent Britain at the 1912 Venice Biennale Exhibition. His work was also part of the painting event in the art competition at the 1928 Summer Olympics.

During World War I, he was a lieutenant in the Royal Engineers and was mentioned in dispatches.

He was elected an Associate Member of the Royal Academy on 22 April 1920, becoming a full Academician on 23 February 1926 and a Senior Academician on 1 January 1943. He served as Keeper of the Royal Academy Schools from October 1927 (he was appointed at the General Assembly on 28 June 1927), leading the school through a period when it was abolishing the Visitor system in favour of permanent staff. He retired in 1942, becoming Honorary Keeper from Michaelmas Day until the end of the year. He also became a member of the Society of Painters in Water Colours in 1930 and was a trustee of the National Gallery (appointed in 1927) and of the Tate Gallery (appointed 1934).

Russell was appointed a Commander of the Royal Victorian Order in 1931, and was knighted in 1935.

He married Lydia Burton (1881–1944) in 1900 and they had no children. He died at his home in Kensington, London in 1949.

== Works ==
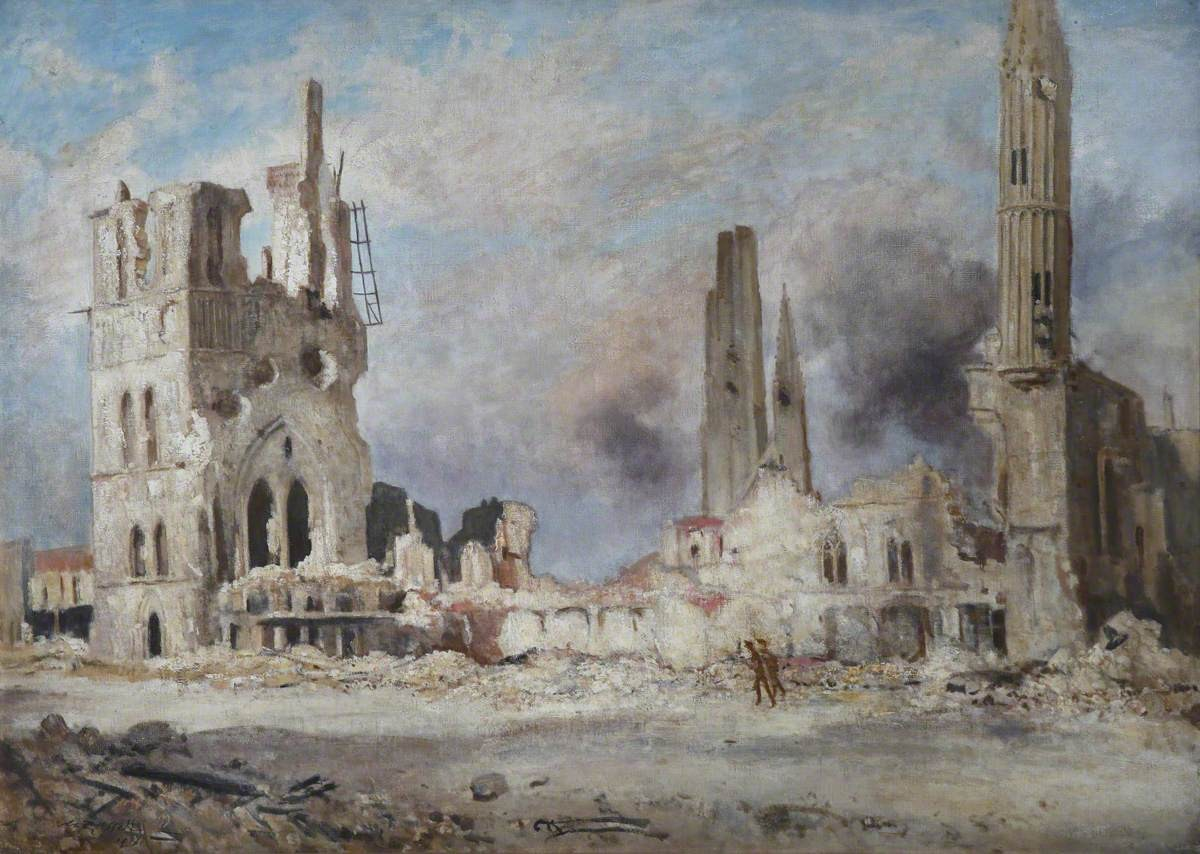
The Cloth Hall, Ypres, 1918

Russell's works include:

- A View of Poole Harbour
- The Morning Room (c. 1907)
- Barber's Shop (1909)
- Donkeys and Kites (1909)
- Carting Sand (1910)
- The Blue Dress (1911)
- The Cloth Hall, Ypres (1918)
- Mr Minney (1920)
- Mrs David Jagger (c. 1925)
- Alice (c. 1926)
- The Amber Beads (1926)
- Cordelia (1930)
- The Farmyard (1934)
- High Tide, Blakeney (1938)
- Studland Beach (c. 1943)
