= Art in Ruins =

Collaborative interventionist practice in art and architecture

Art in Ruins is a collaborative interventionist practice in art and architecture, staging exhibitions and publishing texts, by Hannah Vowles and Glyn Banks. It was formed in 1984.

== History and practice ==
Art in Ruins, based in Bloomsbury, London, uses 1960s conceptual art strategies utilized by Art & Language and Gilbert and George. Works include Trust Us (1997) and We Like You (1995). Their reaction to current art is "iconoclastic" with "a sort of supersensitivity to the politics of art." They curated the exhibition Our Wonderful Culture (St George's Crypt, Bloomsbury 1995) and collaborated with Stewart Home, Ed Baxter, and others on Ruins of Glamour, Glamour of Ruins (Chisenhale Gallery 1986) and Desire in Ruins (Transmission Gallery, Glasgow 1987).

Since the early 1990s, Art in Ruins have been satirising self-expression and focusing on art's economic basis. Like General Idea and Group Material, Art in Ruins may be a group "but they are first and foremost a demolition squad whose target is the last vestiges of value........more than a name" Art in Ruins "is a whole programme."

Their work has been exhibited in major cities throughout Europe. They have been Visiting Professors at the Academy of Fine Arts, Munich. In 1991, Art in Ruins were awarded the DAAD Künstlerprogramm Berlin Stipendium. An exhibition concerning Third World Debt and migration entitled Conceptual Debt was shown at the DAAD Galerie Berlin followed by the discursive event on art activism "trap" with Stephan Geene and Büro Bert at Kunst-Werke Institute for Contemporary Art Berlin in 1993.

Art in Ruins has been in limbo since 2001. This "silence" is the subject of an artist's project and it has also been the subject of two editions of Wavelength arts programme on the community radio station Resonance FM. Their website is at Art in Ruins

Art in Ruins have said of themselves: "it may be that it is our extremely visible failure to be indexed in the recent history of the dominant culture that is our greatest success."
