= Maurice de Sausmarez =

British artist and art educator (1915–1969)

Maurice de Sausmarez (20 October 1915 – 28 October 1969) was an artist, writer and art educator. He played an important role in the establishment of the University of Leeds Department of Fine Art and was Principal of the Byam Shaw School of Drawing and Painting from 1962 to 1969. His influential book Basic Design: The Dynamics of Visual Form (1964) reached a wide international audience and remains in print.

== Early life ==
Born Lionel Maurice de Sausmarez on 20 October 1915 in Sydney, Australia, de Sausmarez was the youngest of two children born to British parents Clarence Montgomery 'Monty' de Sausmarez, a marine engineer in the Merchant Service, and Jessie Rose Macdonald (née Bamford), a piano teacher and widow of the explorer G.A. Macdonald. In 1916 the family moved to Grenada, West Indies. In 1918 de Sausmarez's father Monty disappeared while swimming and was presumed to have been killed by a shark. In 1923, Jessie moved back to England with Maurice, his older brother George was already at school there.

== Education ==
De Sausmarez attended St James Primary School, Highgate from 1923 to 1926. George was at Christ's Hospital, Horsham, which de Sausmarez attended from 1926 to 1932. While at Christ's Hospital de Sausmarez suffered from rheumatic fever and was confined to bed from April 1927 until spring 1928. In 1932 de Sausmarez became a student at Willesden Polytechnic School of Art, studying under Ernest Heber Thompson. He was awarded Board of Education Certificates in Drawing (1934) and Painting (1936).

From 1936 to 1939 de Sausmarez studied at the Royal College of Art (RCA) as a Royal Exhibitioner in Painting. He was awarded an RCA certificate in etching in 1938. At the RCA he was taught by Malcolm Osborne, Robert Austin and Artists' International Association (AIA) members Barnett Freedman and Percy Horton. His work was exhibited at the Whitechapel Art Gallery and at Willesden Polytechnic School of Art, where he won the Special Prize for Portrait Painting and the Gilbert Spencer Landscape Prize, and at De Olympiade Onder Dictatuur in Amsterdam. De Sausmarez was treasurer of the RCA Theatre Group and organised the RCA Students' Group exhibition at the Imperial Institute Gallery, in 1938.

In 1939 he received the Diploma of Associateship and won the Annual Painting Prize. He was awarded a Continuation Scholarship, but had to relinquish it on the outbreak of war.

== Personal life ==
De Sausmarez married Kate Elizabeth Lyons in January 1940. They had a daughter, Phillipa Judith, born in 1941. The couple separated in 1956. While working at Hornsey College of Art de Sausmarez met fellow teacher Jane Boswell. They married in 1963 and had three children (Emma Louise, Simon Benedict and Daniel Maurice). The couple were together until de Sausmarez's death in 1969.

De Sausmarez suffered from ill health throughout his life. Health problems made him resign from his teaching position as an Art Master at King Edward VII Grammar School, Sheffield in 1941 and to be granted a leave of absence from the University of Leeds in 1952. He was hospitalised in April 1957 after suffering a nervous breakdown caused by difficulties in his marriage to Lyons. De Sausmarez returned to work in 1958 with the university making arrangements for his gradual return, including the use of a studio on campus in Beech Grove Terrace. In the summer of 1969, while in France, de Sausmarez was taken ill and returned to England. He died on 28 October at the age of 54, at London Heart Hospital.

Following his death, friends and admirers of de Sausmarez raised funds for a trust. The trust was chaired by painter Carel Weight, and aimed to provide financial support to his family until Daniel, the youngest child, reached school age.

A Thanksgiving service for the life of de Sausmarez was held at St Paul's Church, Covent Garden on 15 December 1969.

== World War II ==
De Sausmarez's application as a conscientious objector, on Christian grounds, went before a tribunal in Leeds in 1940. It was declined, and he was placed on a Special Register for Non-Combatant Service. He failed the Armed Services medical exam so continued to work as a teacher, being called on occasionally to work as a civilian instructor for the Army Educational Corps and carrying out fire picket duties at night.

During World War II de Sausmarez was commissioned to draw buildings and scenes from Bedfordshire as part of the Recording Britain scheme, a Pilgrim Trust project led by Sir Kenneth Clark that recorded the changing landscape of wartime Britain. His drawing of Cardington Bridge was published in the first volume of Recording Britain, in 1946.

De Sausmarez played an active role in the Artists' International Association (AIA) during the war, when it supported leftist and antifascist causes. He had shown work in the 1935 group exhibition Artists against Fascism and War alongside artists such as Henry Moore and Paul Nash and also exhibited in wartime AIA exhibitions. He served on AIA committees and contributed to the association's post-war work to promote the importance of art through travelling exhibitions, affordable prints and a scheme creating murals in schools, libraries and hospitals.

== Art education and teaching ==
De Sausmarez worked in the field of art education, holding teaching positions and working as an external examiner for universities and colleges. He made significant contributions to debates on art education as a member of boards and advisory committees. His experimental approach to education contributed to changes in how art and design were taught from the mid twentieth century. He campaigned for individual creativity and expression, believing that the arts play a vital role in society. In 1963 his article 'Diploma Daze' de Sausmarez spoke out against the cuts to diploma courses made by the Summerson Committee. As an advocate for practical, vocational education he emphasised its importance in training successful artists and designers. In June 1968 he spoke at the Department of Education and Science Conference for Art Advisors at Dartington Hall. His talk Innovation and Continuity in Art Education was influential and well received.

De Sausmarez's first teaching position was as Art Master at King Edward VII Grammar School, Sheffield, in November 1939. He resigned from full-time teaching in 1941 due to ill health but later took up a part-time teaching position at Willesden Polytechnic School of Art. Returning to his old school made de Sausmarez question the prescriptive, traditional curriculum. He became committed to developing a more open-ended, experimental education for his students, exposing them to dance, theatre and music, as well as the visual arts.

De Sausmarez held teaching positions at Horsham School of Art, Leeds College of Art, the University of Leeds, Hornsey College of Art and the independent London art school Byam Shaw School of Drawing and Painting. De Sausmarez taught part-time at London art schools including Goldsmith's College and Harrow School of Art, lectured at UK institutions including the Royal College of Art and spoke at education conferences.

De Sausmarez championed art education for youth groups and published Look this Way, an introduction to the appreciation of painting written for youth clubs, in 1945.

=== Leeds College of Art and the University of Leeds ===
In March 1947, de Sausmarez began his association with the city of Leeds, and the surrounding region when he became Head of the School of Drawing and Painting at Leeds College of Art. In 1950 he was appointed as lecturer of fine art at the University of Leeds, his application for the position was supported by fellow artists Percy Horton, Gilbert Spencer and William Coldstream. The Department of Fine Art was newly instituted and de Sausmarez was appointed to establish and develop the curriculum. On the recommendation of the department's founders Bonamy Dobrée and Herbert Read, practical art classes were introduced and taught with art history. De Sausmarez became Head of the new department in 1950, and through his collaboration with Herbert Read, was instrumental in shaping a new prospectus integrating the study of making art with art history. This programme of study was imitated by other institutions. De Sausmarez was promoted to Senior Lecturer and Head of department in 1954.

At Leeds de Sausmarez organised and chaired lecture series for students and the public, giving many of the presentations himself. These included lectures at Graves Art Gallery in Sheffield and Leeds City Art Gallery, a series of twelve public lectures on nineteenth century French painting and a course of ten university extension lectures relating to the Festival of Britain in 1951. He held various positions including Governor of both Leeds College of Art and Harrogate School of Art, Chief Examiner of Leeds University Institute of Education and was a member of the University Senate.

In July 1952 de Sausmarez visited Makerere College in Uganda at the request of the Inter-University Council for Higher Education in the Colonies. The Makerere College School of Art had been set up in 1937 by Slade alumna Margaret Trowell and was affiliated with the University of London. In collaboration with Trowell, de Sausmarez advised on the development of the school and the forming of a new Diploma course.

=== North Riding Summer School Scarborough ===
De Sausmarez contributed to and organised weekend and summer art courses, notably a residential Summer School in Painting for North Riding County Council. The course ran annually from 1949 to 1953 at Wrea Head College in Scalby, in Scarborough, North Yorkshire, and later at North Riding College. De Sausmarez taught the Summer School alongside colleagues, including fellow RCA graduate, artist and educator Harry Thubron.

== Basic Design ==
'Basic Design', inspired by Bauhaus education principles, played a vital role in revolutionising art school teaching in Britain in the 1950s and 1960s. The key figures in this movement included Victor Pasmore, Tom Hudson, Harry Thubron and de Sausmarez. The two main principles of the movement were a reasoned and objective approach to teaching and the importance of embracing science, technology and the modern world. In 1956 de Sausmarez, Thubron and Hudson contributed to a pivotal Society for Education through Art conference at which de Sausmarez argued that in art theory there existed "a thinly disguised conspiracy against intelligence, resulting from the arbitrary splitting of consciousness and intellect as though they were mutually exclusive instead of inseparable [and that] the denigration of intelligence has serious consequences in art education".

De Sausmarez's approach to 'Basic Design' education focused on fostering a curiosity and inquisitiveness in students. His aim was to create rational, objective teaching that supported emotional and intellectual development; a philosophy he developed with colleague and fellow artist Peter Green while teaching at Hornsey College of Art. De Sausmarez's book on these principles, Basic Design: The Dynamics of Visual Form, was published in 1964 and remains in print.

De Sausmarez's close colleague Harry Thubron developed his Basic Design Course partly at the North Riding Summer Schools they taught together in Scarborough. Thubron's course formed a new model for teaching in art and is still used in Foundation Diplomas.

In 1963 Thubron taught a ten-day winter school course in life drawing at the Byam Shaw School of Drawing and Painting alongside de Sausmarez, sculptor Hubert Dalwood and abstract artist Terry Frost. The experimental course was attended by approximately 70 painters and students and involved laying large sheets of paper on the floor, the students working closely together and several life models moving around the crowded space. It aimed to "destroy habitual practices" and "encourage creative response". The course was documented by painter and filmmaker John Jones, the resulting 30 minute film Drawing with the Figure (1963) includes commentary by Thubron and a soundtrack of improvised jazz.

== Byam Shaw School of Drawing and Painting ==
De Sausmarez was principal of the Byam Shaw School of Drawing and Painting from 1962 to 1969, where he worked to raise its reputation and standard. As principal of Byam Shaw, de Sausmarez championed the importance of talent over the entrance requirements set by the local authority when choosing potential students. He insisted the school remain focused on practical studio work: "the workshops not the talking shops, the academies of the past".

The designer and inventor James Dyson studied at Byam Shaw, choosing the school because of its excellent reputation under de Sausmarez's leadership. Dyson credits de Sausmarez's guidance and teaching with inspiring him to become a designer.

== Broadcasting ==
De Sausmarez provided art education to schools and the wider public through BBC radio programmes such as Art in the North: 'The Future' broadcast in 1951 and Dissipated Octupuses (1959), a programme about the teaching of art to adolescents. He contributed to the Talks for Sixth Forms radio programme, presenting episodes on Artist and Public in 1960 and Paul Cézanne in 1965. The latter was accompanied by a film strip of photographs of Cézanne's work selected by de Sausmarez.

He contributed to discussions on art and art education through BBC radio programmes such as What Kind of Art Schools (1958) and The Fifty-One Society, and the ATV careers programme I am going to work in a creative job shown in October 1962.

== Writing ==
De Sausmarez wrote articles and essays on art education and on artists and their work. His book Basic Design: The Dynamics of Visual Form, aimed at art teachers and students, was in 1964. He wrote books on Pouissin's Orpheus and Eurydice (1969) and Bridget Riley (1970). In 1969 he edited a special issue of the art journal Studio International about the artist Ben Nicholson in which he interviewed artists including Henry Moore and Naum Gabo, and wrote about Nicholson's work.

De Sausmarez wrote regularly for Motif: A Journal of the Visual Arts, edited by designer Ruari McLean. He contributed several articles on art education including Playing it Safe? about the lack of intellectual development in students entering art schools published in Motif 4 (March 1960) and an editorial about the new Diploma in Art and Design (DipAD) in Motif 7 (1961). He wrote about the work of Hubert Dalwood, John Warren-Davis, Trevor Bates and John Hoskin in the Motif 5 (Autumn 1960) article Four abstract sculptors, and about the sculptors, and former assistants to Henry Moore, Oliffe Richmond, Neil Stocker, Clive Sheppard and Anthony Hatwell in the article Four British Sculptors published in Motif 12 (Winter 1964).

== Art and design ==
De Sausmarez was a skilled painter, illustrator and designer. He drew influence from Paul Cézanne, Jacques Villon and Nicolas Poussin, and had a love of abstract art and a gift for close observation which can be seen in many of his landscapes and still lifes.

While a student in 1935, de Sausmarez completed a mural for the Children's Room at Kensal Rise Library, London with fellow Willesden Polytechnic School of Art pupil Dudley Holland. In 1935 he exhibited for the first time with the Artists' International Association (AIA) and in 1937, Bromley Little Theatre commissioned him to design costumes and sets for their production of Elroy Flecker's Hassan.

In 1952 de Sausmarez painted the North Yorkshire coastal village Staithes. The aftermath of World War II had left Britain "bruised" and this vulnerability was demonstrated in his painting showing a fragile landscape of battered old houses. However, in 1955 he painted perhaps one of his most famous paintings Whitelocks Bar, Leeds showing the interior of one of the city's popular public houses.

De Sausmarez worked briefly as a freelance designer and consultant for Lichtex Textiles and had his designs exhibited by the Cotton Board. He produced illustrative commissions for book publishers Chatto & Windus and Odhams Press Ltd, including Odham's Children's Nature Book and F.G. Thomas' The World And You, Historic City and illustrated A.N. Shimmin's book The University of Leeds, the First Half-Century. He completed several portrait commissions, mainly of university figures including University of Hull Vice-Chancellor Dr John H Nicholson (c.1958), University of Leeds Professor of English Literature Bonamy Dobrée (1955) and Gregory Fellow James Kirkup (c. 1951).

De Sausmarez's later work is dominated by landscapes, particularly of France and Italy where he spent many summers painting and scrutinising his surroundings. Tuscan Summer (1955) demonstrates his use of abstract technique to represent a closely observed, pared back landscape. The Luberon Valley in France featured in his landscape paintings after he bought a house there in 1962.

De Sausmarez showed his work in group exhibitions, including the RA Summer Exhibition which he was selected for many times, and once posthumously in 1970. He was elected as an Associate of the Royal Academy in 1964. His work was included in many New English Art Club (NEAC) annual exhibitions between 1939 and 1961, and posthumously in 1970. De Sausmarez's work was included in associated touring exhibitions for both the RA and NEAC shows. His first solo show was held at the Paul Alexander Gallery, London in October 1949.

Several of de Sausmarez's paintings were shown and sold at Pictures for Schools exhibitions, a Society for Education through Art (SEA) scheme founded in 1947 by artist and educationalist Nan Youngman. The aim of the scheme was to enrich the visual education of children through first-hand contact with original artworks within their schools. The exhibitions took place annually in London and displayed works by contemporary British artists for sale to educational buyers and local authorities. De Sausmarez served on the exhibition selection committee in the1960s.

His landscape painting Country Lane was bought by the National Art Gallery of New Zealand in 1958. Collections of his work are held by Cambridge Shire Hall, Leeds Museums and Galleries, Ferens Art Gallery, Sheffield Museums and the University of Leeds.

== Connections in the art world ==
De Sausmarez built an expansive network of professional connections and was a crucial figure in the circle of artists, thinkers and groups that informed the cultural life of post-war Britain. While studying painting at the Royal College of Art he was introduced to artist Peggy Angus who he regularly visited at her cottage Furlongs. Artist Percy Horton taught de Sausmarez at RCA and wrote a letter of recommendation for his application to the University of Leeds in 1949. Horton wrote the catalogue introduction for de Sausmarez's first solo exhibition the same year.

De Sausmarez worked regularly with fellow artist and educator Harry Thubron, most notably at the North Riding Summer Schools in Scarborough, and supported Thubron's appointment as Head of the School of Painting at Leeds College of Art in 1955. He also taught alongside artists Carel Weight, Hubert Dalwood and Terry Frost, and art historian and philosopher Herbert Read as well as working with poet Jon Silkin on an exhibition of Isaac Rosenberg's work in 1959. In 1960, de Sausmarez offered artist John Hoyland his first teaching position at Hornsey College of Art after discovering a pile of Hoyland's abstract paintings at the Royal Academy.

=== Bridget Riley ===
De Sausmarez first met painter Bridget Riley in 1959 when she attended a residential summer course on Colour-Forms at Groton Hall, Suffolk that he ran with Harry Thubron and Diane Thubron. Later the same year he visited her studio off Fulham Road. He became her friend and mentor, introducing her to Futurism and Divisionism, and inspiring her to look closer at artists such as Klee and Seurat. Riley's introduction to Futurist painting involved discussions and analyses with de Sausmarez while he was preparing a series of lectures for the Royal College of Art. De Sausmarez and Riley began an intense romantic relationship in 1959 and spent the summer of 1960 together painting in Italy where they visited the Venice Biennale. Riley painted Pink landscape (1960), a pointillist study of the landscape near Radicofani during this holiday. After returning from Italy de Sausmarez suggested Riley take up a part time teaching job at Hornsey College of Art where he was Head of the Fine Art Department. When the relationship ended in autumn of the same year, Riley suffered a personal and artistic crisis, creating paintings that would lead to the black and white Op Art works, such as Kiss (1961).

The relationship between de Sausmarez and Riley evolved into a long term professional friendship. Riley has often cited his role as an early mentor. He wrote enthusiastically in appreciation of her work, composing a catalogue introduction for her first solo exhibition in 1962, and for subsequent exhibitions in 1969. At the time of his death, he was working on a monograph on Riley, which was published posthumously in 1970. De Sausmarez also chaired the working committee for Space (studios), a London organisation co-founded by Riley and Peter Sedgley to provide affordable studio space to artists.

In 2019 the Bridget Riley Art Foundation supported the acquisition of de Sausmarez's archive by the University of Leeds.

=== Ben Nicholson ===
A short but productive professional relationship developed between de Sausmarez and painter Ben Nicholson while de Sausmarez was compiling a special issue of Studio International dedicated to Nicholson. The two corresponded regularly from 1966 to 1969, when it was published, and de Sausmarez visited Nicholson at his home in Switzerland. De Sausmarez also interviewed fellow artists Naum Gabo and Henry Moore about Nicholson and his work.

=== Kenneth Leighton ===
Composer Kenneth Leighton met de Sausmarez in 1953 when Leighton became the first Gregory Fellow in Music at the University of Leeds. A close friendship developed. De Sausmarez commissioned Leighton to compose a musical piece in memory of his mother Jessie after her death in 1963. The resulting piece, Seven Variations for String Quartet Opus 43, was performed for the first time at the Byam Shaw student exhibition in 1964. A second memorial piece by Leighton, this time in memory of de Sausmarez, was performed at the Thanksgiving service for de Sausmarez's life on 15 December 1969.

== Legacy ==
De Sausmarez's approach to teaching art as a "social medium that is vital to humanity" inspired many that studied under him. In 1971, the exhibition Homage to Maurice de Sausmarez was organised by students at Byam Shaw School of Drawing and Painting as a tribute. Alongside de Sausmarez's own paintings, works by friends, colleagues and former students were donated, with proceeds from sales going into a trust for de Sausmarez's children. Exhibiting artists included David Hockney, Carel Weight, Terry Frost, Hubert Dalwood, Ben Nicholson, Henry Moore, John Hoyland, Prunella Clough, Lynn Chadwick, Patrick Heron, William Scott, Peter Sedgley and Bridget Riley. The exhibition was described as "an exceedingly attractive and lively exhibition of British art today" and the quality of Byam Shaw School and its students considered a memorial in itself to de Sausmarez's life and work.

1971 saw the first Maurice de Sausmarez Memorial Lecture, organised by the Council of Management of the Byam Shaw School. The first lecture, The Art Lesson, was given by Professor Richard Wollheim. The lectures continued annually until 1990 and speakers included Germaine Greer, Melvyn Braggart historian Professor Griselda Pollock and Basic Design advocate Richard Hamilton.

In 2015 a retrospective exhibition of de Sausmarez's work was held at The Stanley and Audrey Burton Gallery, University of Leeds. The exhibition marked the centenary of de Sausmarez's birth and brought together paintings, illustrations and other works from throughout his career. James Dyson gave a speech at the exhibition's opening event in which he spoke about de Sausmarez's great artistic influence on him and his career.

De Sausmarez's archive is held by the University of Leeds Special Collections, having been acquired from the Maurice de Sausmarez Family Trust in 2019.

== Exhibitions ==
=== Solo exhibitions ===
- 1949: Paintings by Maurice de Sausmarez, Paul Alexander Gallery, London
- 1951: Paintings by Maurice de Sausmarez, The Haworth Gallery, Wakefield
- 1971: Homage to Maurice de Sausmarez, Upper Grosvenor Galleries, London (posthumous)
- 2015: Maurice de Sausmarez 1915–1969, The Stanley and Audrey Burton Gallery, Leeds (posthumous)

=== Selected group exhibitions ===
- Royal Academy Summer Exhibition: 1947–48, 1950–55, 1957, 1959, 1962–69, and 1970 (posthumous)
- New English Art Club Annual Exhibition: 1938, 1939, 1940, 1942–55, 1947, 1950–52, 1961, and 1970 (posthumous)
- 1935: Artists International Association: Artists against Fascism & War, 28 Soho Square London
- 1936: Exhibition of 15 Students' Sketch Clubs, Whitechapel Art Gallery, London
- 1936: De Olympiade Onder Dictatuur, Amsterdam
- 1937: AIA: Artists against Fascism & War, 28 Soho Square, London
- 1938: Students' Group Exhibition, Royal College of Art, London
- 1939: AIA: Unity for Artists of Peace, Democracy, and Cultural Development, Whitechapel Gallery, London
- 1942: Scheme for Recording the Changing Face of Britain, National Gallery, London
- 1946: AIA: Painters Today, 56 Pall Mall, London
- 1953: Yorkshire Artists' Exhibition, Leeds City Art Gallery
- 1953: Figures in their Setting, Tate Gallery, London
- 1955: Self Portraits of Contemporary Painters, Ferens Art Gallery, Kingston-Upon-Hull
- 1956: Maurice de Sausmarez, Terry Frost and Hubert Dalwood, Leeds University
- 1956: The Seasons, Tate Gallery, London
- 1967: Contemporary British Landscape Painters, Upper Grosvenor Galleries, London
- 1969: The Nude, New Grafton Gallery, London

== Selected publications ==
- Look This Way, An Introduction to Paintings (1945)
- Playing it Safe?, Motif: A Journal of the Visual Arts, 4 (March 1960)
- Four abstract sculptors, Motif: A Journal of the Visual Arts, 5 (Autumn 1960)
- Gestation of a Diploma, Motif: A Journal of the Visual Arts 7 (Summer 1961)
- Diploma Daze, The Guardian (27 June 1963)
- Basic Design: The Dynamics of Visual Form (1964)
- Four British Sculptors, Motif: A Journal of the Visual Arts, 12 (Winter 1964)
- Nicholas Poussin's 'Orpheus and Eurydice' (1969)
- Ben Nicholson: A Studio International Special (1969)
- Bridget Riley (1970)
- Discussion between Peter Sedgely and Maurice de Sausmarez, Leonardo Vol. 4 Spring 1971
