= Foundation course =

Preparatory course for an art and design degree

A foundation course is a preparatory course for university-level art and design education, used particularly in the United Kingdom.

== Description ==
A foundation course is a one or two-year preparatory course for school-leavers who want to qualify for a place on a bachelor's degree course in art, design or architecture. The course is almost entirely practical in nature, although increasingly elements of art and design history have been introduced, and it is considered sufficient to qualify those who pass it to move on to a degree course without further study. It is the dominant form of entry to university and art college degree courses in the United Kingdom, but versions of it exist in several other countries, particularly where British influence over art education has been historically strong. In Ireland it is known as the Core Studies course, and versions of the foundation course also exist in Australia, Canada, Cyprus, Malta, Malaysia and New Zealand.

== Origin and methodology ==
Harry Thubron at Leeds College of Art. Together they began to establish a team to deliver a new form of art preparation course they called the Basic Design Course. The aim of the course was to teach what were considered to be the basic skills that underpin all art and design activities, including architecture. This resulted in projects designed to develop skills in using colour, articulating two- and three-dimensional space, defining form and experimenting with diverse materials. Many of these theories were tested by Thubron at a series of art summer schools in the seaside town of Scarborough, North Yorkshire, which attracted art students, artists and art teachers from throughout Britain. The result of this was that the theories of the basic design course were very widely disseminated, which helped the programme to become so widespread.

This approach to preparing art and design students for degree level study had its origins in the writings of Herbert Read, and Coldstream, Thubron and Read regularly met to discuss their ideas at Read's house in the village of Stonegrave, North Yorkshire. Read's ideas had their origin in the German Bauhaus school of art, which had used a similar method prior to its closure by the Nazis in 1933.

A notable feature of this method of the foundation course method is that it does not teach basic versions of later art or design practices, so that someone wanting to be a painter would not be taught basic painting, or a student wanting to be a graphic designer would not be taught basic graphic design. Specific skills were left to be taught in the specific degree course itself, whereas the foundation course only focused on the core skills that are perceived to be common to all art and design practices.

== Current status ==
- University of the Arts London Awarding Body
- Edexcel
- Welsh Joint Education Committee
- ABC Awards
- Ascentis

Outside of the United Kingdom, most Foundation Course programmes are validated by universities or national education authorities, although the programmes in Malta and Cyprus are validated by the United Kingdom examining boards.
