= Evelyn Grace Ince =

British painter (1886–1941)

- Born: 1 March 1886; British India
- Died: 7 May 1941 (aged 55)
- Education: Byam Shaw and Vicat Cole School of Art

Evelyn Grace Ince (1 March 1886 – 7 May 1941) was a British painter who exhibited water colour and tempera art at the Royal Academy, Royal Institute of Painters in Water Colours, the New English Art Club, and elsewhere.

== Early life and education ==
Evelyn Grace Ince was born in Bhagalpur, Bihar, India, on 1 March 1886 to Reverend John Cook Ince and his wife Sarah Lydia (née Heasberry). From 1911 to 1916, she studied at the Byam Shaw and Vicat Cole School of Art.

== Career ==
At the time of the 1911 census, Ince was 25 years old and described as an artist working in black and white. In 1926 she joined the Royal Society of British Artists and around a decade later became a member of the Royal Institute of Painters in Water Colours. She exhibited water colour and tempera art at several institutes including the Royal Academy of Arts, Royal Institute of Painters in Water Colours, and the New English Art Club.

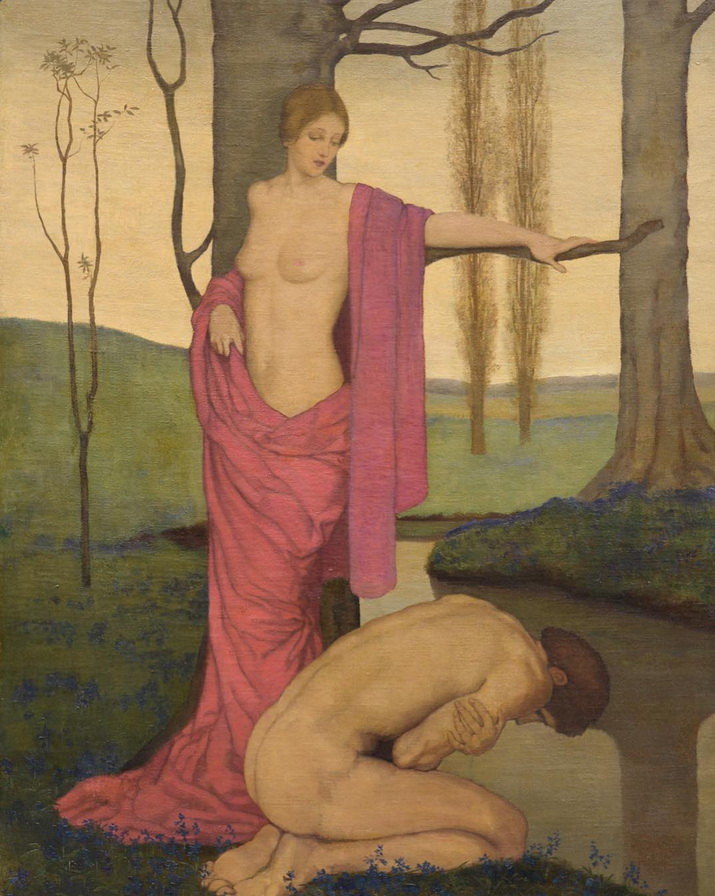
Evelyn Grace Ince, 'Echo and Narcissus', 1915

== Death ==
Ince died unmarried at Letchworth Hospital on 7 May 1941.
