= Peggy Angus =

British painter, designer and educator

- Born: Margaret MacGregor Angus; 9 November 1904; Chile
- Died: 28 October 1993 (aged 88); London Borough of Camden, England
- Education: North London Collegiate School; Royal College of Art
- Known for: Painting, design
- Spouse: James Maude Richards

Margaret MacGregor Angus (9 November 1904 – 28 October 1993) was a British painter, designer and teacher. Born in Chile, she spent her career in Britain.

== Early life ==
Angus was born in Chile on 9 November 1904, in a railway station, the eleventh of thirteen children of a Scottish railway engineer. She spent her first five years in Chile. In Britain, she grew up in Muswell Hill and became a pupil at the North London Collegiate School. At 17, she entered the Royal College of Art and, later, won a painting and teaching scholarship to Paris. At the RCA, her contemporaries included the sculptors Henry Moore and Barbara Hepworth, the painters Eric Ravilious and Edward Bawden, and illustrators Barnett Freedman and Enid Marx. She wanted to be a painter but soon transferred to the Design School at the RCA, where she was taught by Paul Nash. In order to earn a living, she took a teacher training course and began her first teaching post in 1925. Angus travelled to Russia in 1932 for an art teachers' study visit and later urged her students to travel to the Soviet Union. This earned her the nickname "Red Angus".

== Personal life ==
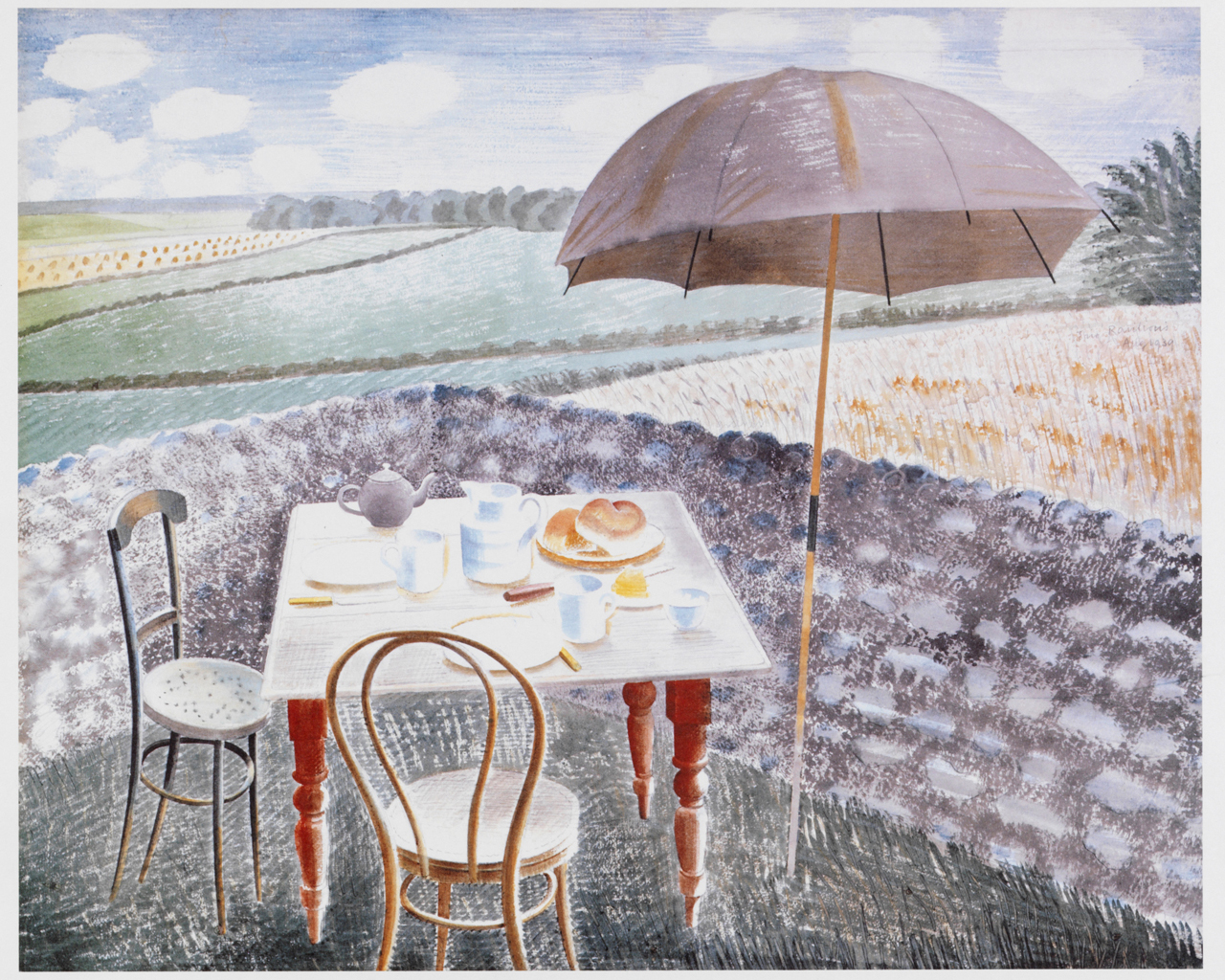
Tea at Furlongs 1939, by Eric Ravilious

After her visit to Russia in 1932, she became one of the founding members of Artists' International Association, an organisation born out of the social and political conflicts of the 1930s. Between 1938 and 1947, Angus was married to James Maude Richards, a young architect and writer, with whom she had a daughter, Victoria, and a son Angus. Later, Richards and Angus divorced. He became editor of the Architectural Review and introduced her to many modernist architects. She was a charismatic and formidable character, opinionated and inclined to exhibitionism but also generous-spirited, extremely sociable and a great inspiration to many young people.

Angus had a great love of the outdoor life – camping and hiking – and was an intrepid traveller with her rucksack on her back. She eschewed a bourgeois lifestyle for places without modern conveniences, such as Furlongs on the Sussex Downs and her bothie she bought from the artist Charles Higgins in the Outer Hebrides. In her childhood, she befriended gypsies in north London encampments and learnt a little Romany. She travelled widely in Europe and across the Middle East to India and Pakistan, looking at patterns and popular culture. She spent a year in Indonesia on a scholarship studying folk art in Java and Bali. She went twice to the USSR, in 1932 as a delegate for the Art Masters Association, and again in the late 1960s with her friends Ursula Mommens and Pearl Binder and teachers of music, art and drama, arranged through the Society of Cultural Relations with the USSR.

== Design work and art ==
Angus became best known for her industrial designs, tiles and wallpapers. Her significant achievements included a tile mural for the Susan Lawrence School in east London, a "live exhibit" for the Festival of Britain, a tile mural at the British Pavilion at the 1958 Bruxelles Exhibition and tile designs for Sir Frederick Gibberd at London Heathrow Airport. She also designed a new form of marbling design for glass cladding for the original buildings at Gatwick Airport, which were produced by the firm TW Ide and given the trade name "Anguside". The massive post-war increase in new public architecture led to a large number of commissions from F.R.S. Yorke of YRM (Yorke Rosenberg and Mardell) for tile designs, particularly for new schools and colleges. Her tile designs were produced commercially by Carter and Sons of Poole, Dorset. In 1952, she was made a member of the National Council of Industrial Design.

Angus was also interested in mural painting and made several murals for private clients. She tested her designs on demonstration lengths of lining paper. Architects who saw these encouraged her to develop a hand-printed wallpaper business. This coincided with the 1960s expansion of DIY and the development of "choose your own colour mix" vinyl emulsion paints which she used with hand-cut linoleum printing blocks. She won the Sanderson Centenary wallpaper prize but their subsequent commercial version, which had the regularity of a machine-printed design, was far less restful to the eye than the subtle changes of pigment and pressure when done by her own methods. She always wanted her designs to be a sympathetic background on which to hang pictures. She continued to print her own designs with the help of a team of willing apprentices.

Angus's paintings of the family of Ramsay MacDonald and John Piper hang in the National Portrait Gallery in London. Ishbel MacDonald was a lifelong friend and Angus occasionally stayed at Chequers with her and enjoyed the subversiveness of drawing cartoons for the Daily Worker while she was there.

== Furlongs ==
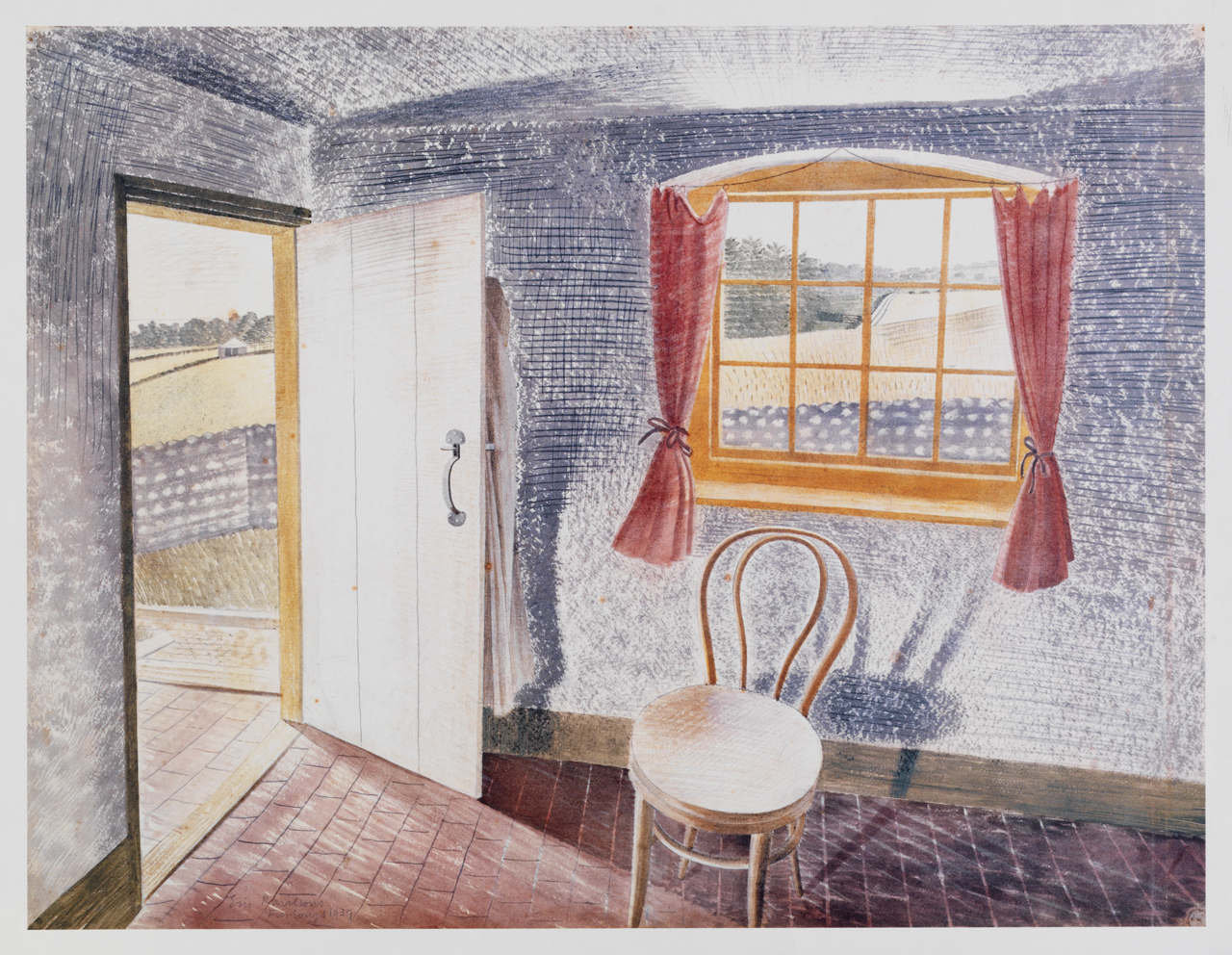
Interior at Furlongs 1939, by Eric Ravilious

From 1933 onwards, Angus rented a shepherd's cottage, Furlongs, near Beddingham at the foot of the South Downs, and made that a home to which a circle of artists gathered. These included Eric Ravilious, Tirzah Garwood and John Piper. Ravilious considered that his time at Furlongs: "...altered my whole outlook and way of painting, I think because the colour of the landscape was so lovely and the design so beautifully obvious ... that I simply had to abandon my tinted drawings."

Ravilious made many drawings and paintings of the Downs around Furlongs and of the cottage inside and out. He and Angus both made paintings together at the quarry and cement works at nearby Asham. Other visitors included Herbert Read, Olive Cook, Edwin Smith, Percy Horton, Maurice de Sausmarez, the architects Moholy-Nagy, Serge Chermayeff, Ernő Goldfinger, Frederick Gibberd, Maxwell Fry, and Jane Drew. Her lifelong friendship with Piper and Myfanwy Evans resulted in a long correspondence about folk art and popular art. In 1946, Angus introduced Tirzah Garwood to radio producer Henry Swanzy, who would becone Garwood's second husband.

== Teacher ==
Angus was a part-time teacher for much of her life and believed her teaching was as important as creating her own work. After the war, she taught briefly alongside Quentin Bell at a private girls' school in Sussex (they had been friends and colleagues in the Artists International Association). From 1930 to 1946, she taught art at secondary schools in Sussex and London, before returning to the North London Collegiate School in 1947.

As head of art at North London Collegiate, her own old school, she believed in setting up communal projects where pupils' works could be displayed to their best advantage. These projects also improved the school's visual environment and expanded her influence beyond the art rooms. She fostered a community of artists and designers in South East England, having a durable influence on decorative arts and fashion, for instance through Janet Kennedy. She wanted to encourage a sense of patronage and visual literacy for all, including those not thinking of following an artistic career. She remained a teacher at the school until 1970.
