= Janet Kennedy (designer) =

British print designer (1934–2021)

For the Scottish noble, see Janet Kennedy.

Janet Kennedy (28 June 1934 - 8 July 2021) was a British print designer known for her work on childrenswear for Clothkits.

== Biography ==
Kennedy was born to Stewart and Connie Eady in Pinner, Middlesex. She studied at the North London Collegiate school under Peggy Angus. She then left to study sculpture at the Edinburgh College of Art.

Through Angus, Kennedy was introduced to artists in South-East England who were also interested in art for daily life. She established herself near Lewes and in 1971, joined a local company, Clothkits, a mail-order known for its kits to make colourful and easy-to-make children's clothes, as well as accessories and toys. Clothkits expanded considerably during the 1970s, shaping British childrenswear fashion and establishing Kennedy's reputation as a pattern designer.

Kennedy was married to Tyl Kennedy; they had four children.
