= Marilyn Malin =

British children's publisher, editor and literary agent (died 2022)

- Born: 1935 or 1936
- Died: 2022 (age 86)
- Education: North London Collegiate School
- Alma mater: King's College London
- Occupations: Publisher; editor; agent
- Known for: Managing director at Methuen Children's Books

Marilyn Malin (died 2022) was a British literary agent, an editor and a publisher; she was the managing director of Methuen Children's Books.

== Early life and education ==
Marilyn Malin's parents were Irene (née Littenberg) and Albert Malin; she was Jewish, and born and brought up in Golders Green, London. She had at least one sister. Marilyn attended North London Collegiate School. She was awarded a state scholarship, which she took up at King's College London.

== Career ==
Malin obtained a job as a secretary at the publishers Blackie and Son in the 1950s. In the 1960s, she joined Methuen Children's Books, first as an assistant to Olive Jones. Malin became assistant children's books editor in 1965, and, towards the end of the 1960s, managing director. With Charles Shirley, she "create[d] the separate entity of Methuen Children's Books. It was an outward-looking company whose sense of identity was enhanced by bright design, a keen marketing drive, and a strong European flavour". Malin was described as one of the "eminent editorial directors of her time". Her acceptance, in 1966 with Olive Jones, of The River Kings by Max Fatchen, has been described as the result of "a culture of calculated risk".

In the 1980s, Malin left Methuen to become a literary agent.

Malin was the UK editor for Astrid Lindgren, and for Ivan Southall. She was editor for Rosemary Manning, and wrote about her for the journal Bookbird. She published Michael Morpurgo's Warhorse, and books by Floella Benjamin, John Agard and James Berry. She worked with Michael Palin on his children's book Small Harry. Malin was the agent for Kjartan Poskitt, She was a mentor to the illustrator Jane Pinkney. Malin commissioned a book written by Alison Prince with 21 primary-school children.

In 1986, Malin started her own publishing imprint, Marilyn Malin Books, in partnership with André Deutsch.

== Personal life ==
Malin died in 2022, aged 86.

== Publications ==
- "Ruth Manning-Saunders: a memoir", in Bookbird, 1989 (27,1), pp. 9–10.
