= Hannah Robertson (educationist) =

British educationist

- Born: 5 November 1862; Peterhead
- Died: 15 March 1950 (aged 87); Paignton
- Employer: Leeds University
- Known for: British educationist and promoter of higher education for women

Hannah Robertson (5 November 1862 – 15 March 1950) was a British educationist and promoter of higher education for women. She was head hunted in 1904 by Leeds University and she was their "Mistress of Method" and their "Tutor of Women" until 1921. In 1924 she was awarded a doctor of laws.

== Life ==
Robertson was born in Peterhead in 1862. Her father, Francis Robertson, built ships and he and Hannah (born Smith) had six notable sisters. Hannah was the fourth of the six. When she was five the rest of the family emigrated to New Zealand leaving her in Peterhead in the care of relatives. Her mother and sisters returned when she was eleven after her father's death.

All of her sisters went to train at the North London Collegiate School, but Hannah was at college when she was eighteen and she then went to teach at the Maria Grey School while she studied for a London University degree. Meanwhile, her sister Mary had been teaching at the North London Collegiate School but she resigned to go to Siam to teach the royal family. Frances Buss who led the North London Collegiate School recruited Hannah to replace Mary.

She was head hunted in 1904 by Leeds University. Leeds had been part of Victoria University, but in 1904 Leeds gained its own royal charter. Leeds University wanted to encourage more women students, it had never barred students based on gender. It decided to pay the unprecedented salary of £400 per annum to take on a double role of "Mistress of Method" in the Education department and as the Tutor of Women.

Robertson oversaw a large increase in the number of women students. In 1910 she gained two assistants. In 1921 she requested to retire from January 1922 and the university board thanked her for her work. There was no one who could carry out the double job that she had carried out. She was replaced by more than one person.

In 1924 she was awarded a doctor of laws by her university. She was the first woman to receive this honour from Leeds University.

Robertson died in retirement at St Margaret's Nursing Home in Paignton in 1950.
