= Bridget Riley =

British painter (born 1931)

Bridget Riley CH CBE
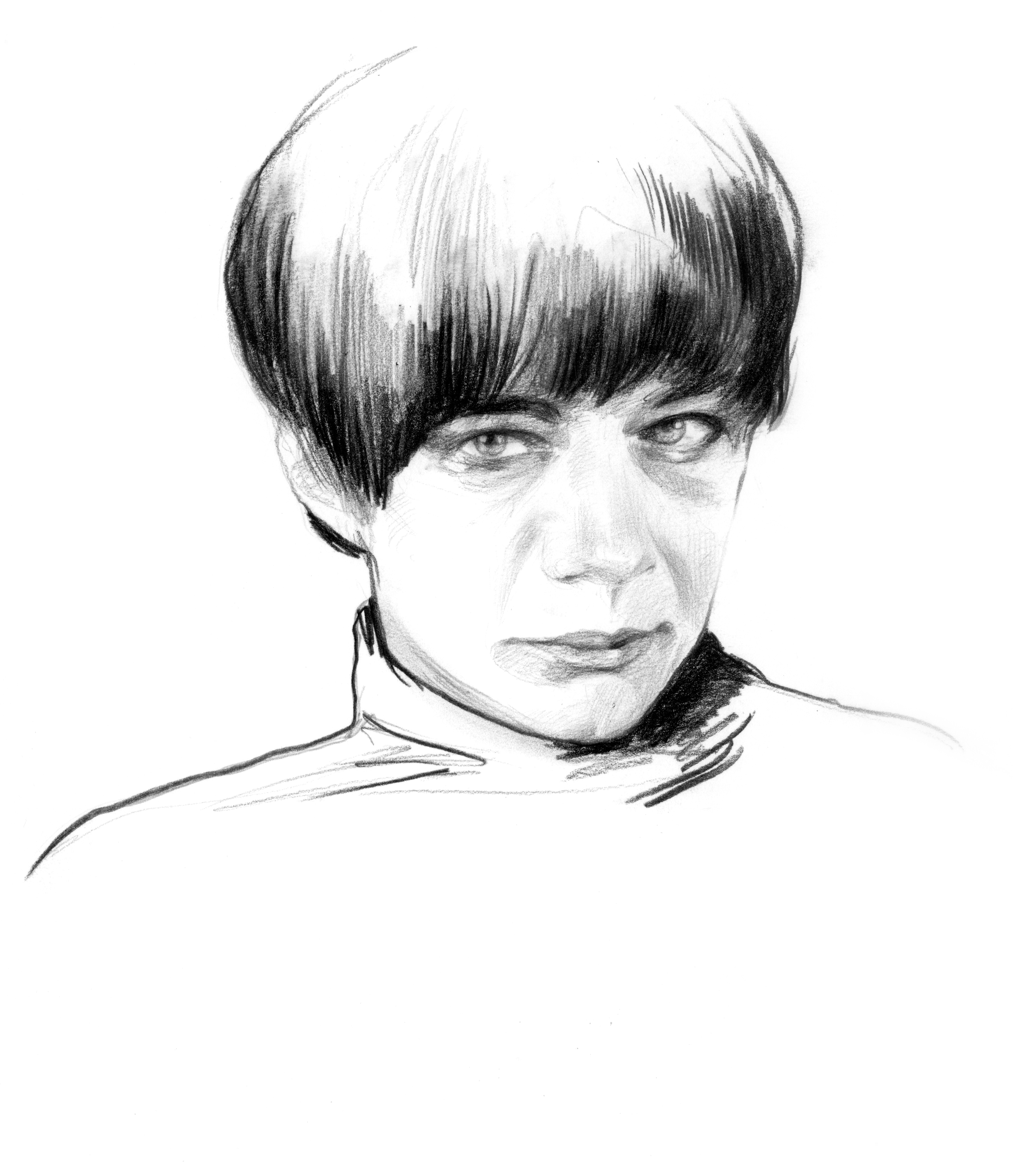
- Born: Bridget Louise Riley; 24 April 1931 (age 95); Norwood, London, England
- Education: Cheltenham Ladies' College (1946–1948); Goldsmiths' College (1949–52); Royal College of Art (1952–55)
- Known for: Painting; drawing; printmaking
- Movement: Op art
- Awards: Praemium Imperiale (2003)

Shadow Play, 1990, oil on canvas

Bridget Louise Riley (born 24 April 1931) is an English painter known for her op art paintings. She lives and works in London, Cornwall and the Vaucluse in France.

== Early life and education ==
Riley was born on 24 April 1931 in Norwood, London. Her father, John Fisher Riley, originally from Yorkshire, had been an Army officer. He was a printer by trade and owned his own business. In 1938, he relocated the printing business, together with his family, to Lincolnshire.

At the beginning of World War II, her father, a member of the Territorial Army, was mobilised, and Riley, together with her mother and sister Sally, moved to a cottage in Cornwall. They shared the cottage with an aunt who had studied at Goldsmiths' College, London and Riley attended talks given by a range of retired teachers and non-professionals. She attended Cheltenham Ladies' College (1946–1948) and then studied art at Goldsmiths' College (1949–52), and later at the Royal College of Art (1952–55).

Between 1956 and 1959, she nursed her father, who had been involved in a serious car crash. She suffered a breakdown due to the deterioration of her father's health. After this she worked in a glassware shop. She eventually joined the J. Walter Thompson advertising agency, as an illustrator, where she worked part-time until 1962. The Whitechapel Gallery exhibition of Jackson Pollock in the winter of 1958 had an impact on her.

Her early work was figurative and semi-impressionist. Between 1958 and 1959, her work at the advertising agency showed her adoption of a style of painting based on the pointillist technique.

In 1959, Riley met the painter and art educator Maurice de Sausmarez at a residential summer school that he ran with Harry Thubron and Diane Thubron. He became her friend and mentor, inspiring her to look closer at Futurism and Divisionism and artists such as Klee and Seurat. Riley and de Sausmarez began an intense romantic relationship later that year and spent the summer of 1960 together painting in Italy where they visited the Venice Biennale which was hosting a large exhibition of Futurist art. Riley painted Pink landscape (1960), a pointillist study of the landscape near Radicofani during this holiday. When the relationship ended in autumn of the same year, Riley suffered a personal and artistic crisis, creating paintings that would lead to black and white Op Art works, such as Kiss (1961). She began to develop her signature Op Art style consisting of black and white geometric patterns that explore the dynamism of sight and produce a disorienting effect on the eye and produces movement and colour. Riley and de Sausmarez maintained a professional friendship until his death in 1969. Riley has often cited his role as an early mentor and de Sausmarez's monograph on Riley and her work was published after his death in 1970.

Early in her career, Riley worked as an art teacher for children from 1957 to 1958 at the Convent of the Sacred Heart, Harrow (now known as Sacred Heart Language College). At the Convent of the Sacred Heart, she began a basic design course. Later she worked at the Loughborough School of Art (1959), Hornsey College of Art, and Croydon College of Art (1962–64).

In 1961, she and her partner Peter Sedgley visited the Vaucluse plateau in the South of France, and acquired a derelict farm which they eventually transformed into a studio. Back in London, in the spring of 1962, Victor Musgrave of Gallery One held her first solo exhibition.

In 1968, Riley, with Sedgley and the journalist Peter Townsend, created the artists' organisation SPACE (Space Provision Artistic Cultural and Educational), with the goal of providing artists large and affordable studio space.

== Seurat's way of seeing ==
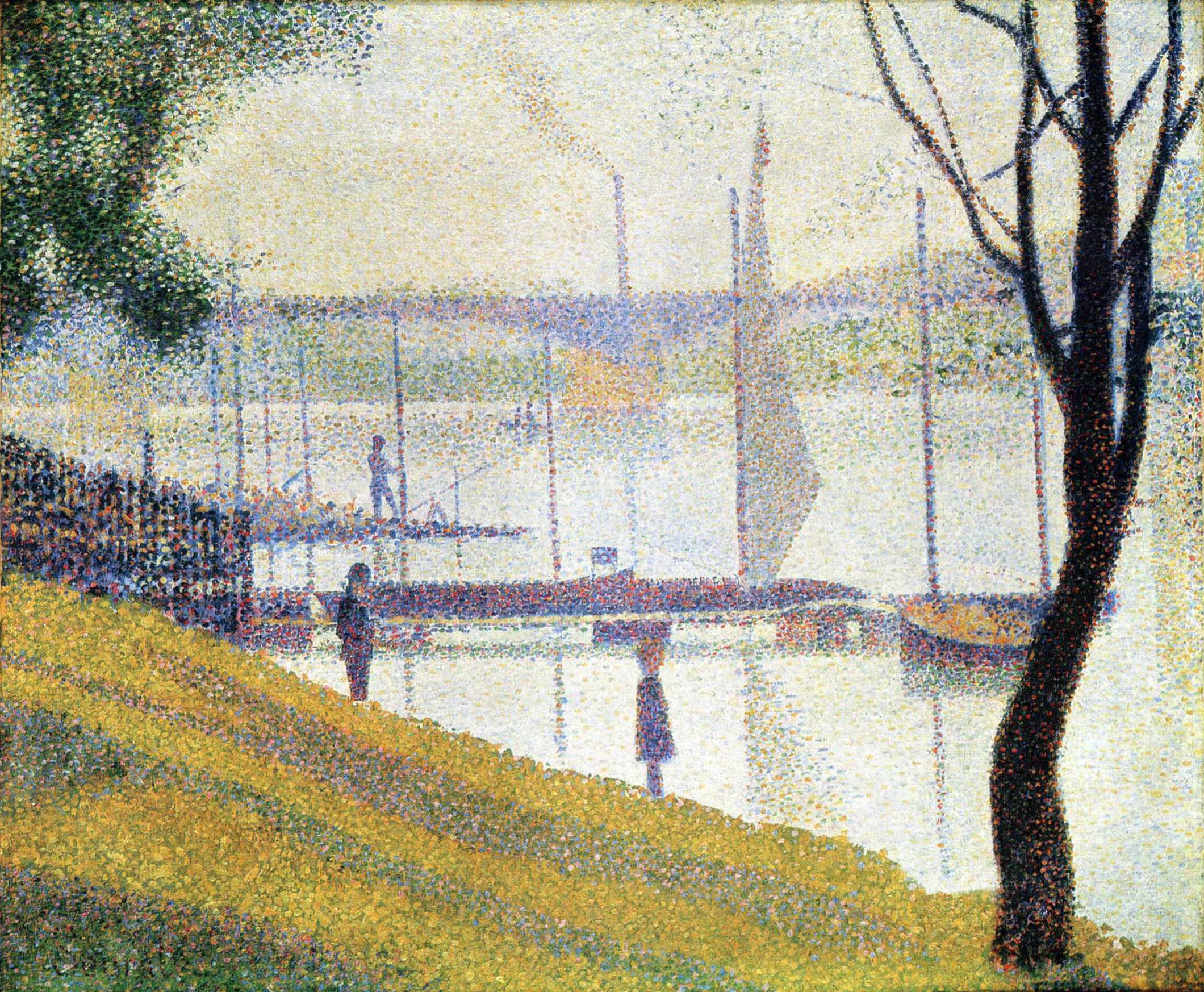
Georges Seurat's 1886–1887 The Bridge at Courbevoie, copied and enlarged by Riley, had a powerful influence on her approach to painting.

The Courtauld Gallery's 2015–2016 exhibition "Bridget Riley: Learning from Seurat", including her 1960 painting Pink Landscape (seen here in the poster) showed how Riley's style was influenced by Georges Seurat's pointillism and pleasure in seeing.

Riley's mature style, developed during the 1960s, was influenced by sources like the French Neo-Impressionist artist Georges Seurat. In 2015–6, the Courtauld Gallery, in its exhibition Bridget Riley: Learning from Seurat, made the case for how Seurat's pointillism influenced her towards abstract painting. As a young artist in 1959, Riley saw The Bridge at Courbevoie, owned by the Courtauld, and decided to paint a copy. The resulting work has hung in Riley's studio ever since, barring its loan to the gallery for the exhibition, demonstrating in the opinion of the art critic Jonathan Jones "how crucial" Seurat was to her approach to art. Riley described her copy of Seurat's painting as a "tool", interpreted by Jones as meaning that she, like Seurat, practised art "as an optical science"; in his view, Riley "really did forge her optical style by studying Seurat", making the exhibition a real meeting of old and new. Jones comments that Riley investigated Seurat's pointillism by painting from a book illustration of Seurat's Bridge at an expanded scale to work out how his technique made use of complementary colours, and went on to create pointillist landscapes of her own, such as Pink Landscape (1960), painted soon after her Seurat study and portraying the "sun-filled hills of Tuscany" (and shown in the exhibition poster) which Jones writes could readily be taken for a post-impressionist original. In his view, Riley shares Seurat's "joy for life", a simple but radical delight in colour and seeing.

== Work ==
It was during this period that Riley began to paint the black and white works for which she first became known. They present a great variety of geometric forms that produce sensations of movement or colour. In the early 1960s, her works were said to induce a variety of sensations in viewers, from seasickness to the feeling of sky diving. From 1961 to 1965, she worked with the contrast of black and white, occasionally introducing tonal scales of grey. Works in this style comprised her first 1962 solo show at Musgrave's Gallery One, as well as numerous subsequent shows. For example, in Fall, a single perpendiculars curve is repeated to create a field of varying optical frequencies. Visually, these works relate to many concerns of the period: a perceived need for audience participation (this relates them to the Happenings, which were common in this era), challenges to the notion of the mind-body duality which led Aldous Huxley to experiment with hallucinogenic drugs; concerns with a tension between a scientific future which might be very beneficial or might lead to a nuclear war; and fears about the loss of genuine individual experience in a Brave New World. Her paintings since 1961, have been executed by assistants. She meticulously plans her composition's design with preparatory drawings and collage techniques; her assistants paint the final canvases with great precision under her instruction.

Riley began investigating colour in 1967, the year in which she produced her first stripe painting. Following a major retrospective in the early 1970s, Riley began travelling extensively. After a trip to Egypt in the early 1980s, where she was inspired by colourful hieroglyphic decoration, Riley began to explore colour and contrast. In some works, lines of colour are used to create a shimmering effect, while in others the canvas is filled with tessellating patterns. Typical of these later colourful works is Shadow Play.

Some works are titled after particular dates, others after specific locations (for instance, Les Bassacs, the village near Saint-Saturnin-lès-Apt in the south of France where Riley has a studio).

Following a visit to Egypt in 1980–81, Riley created colours in what she called her 'Egyptian palette' and produced works such as the Ka and Ra series, which capture the spirit of the country, ancient and modern, and reflect the colours of the Egyptian landscape. Invoking the sensorial memory of her travels, the paintings produced between 1980 and 1985 exhibit Riley's free reconstruction of the restricted chromatic palette discovered abroad. In 1983, for the first time in fifteen years, Riley returned to Venice to once again study the paintings that form the basis of European colourism. Towards the end of the 1980s, Riley's work underwent a dramatic change with the reintroduction of the diagonal in the form of a sequence of parallelograms used to disrupt and animate the vertical stripes that had characterized her previous paintings. In Delos (1983), for example, blue, turquoise, and emerald hues alternate with rich yellows, reds and white.

=== Murals ===
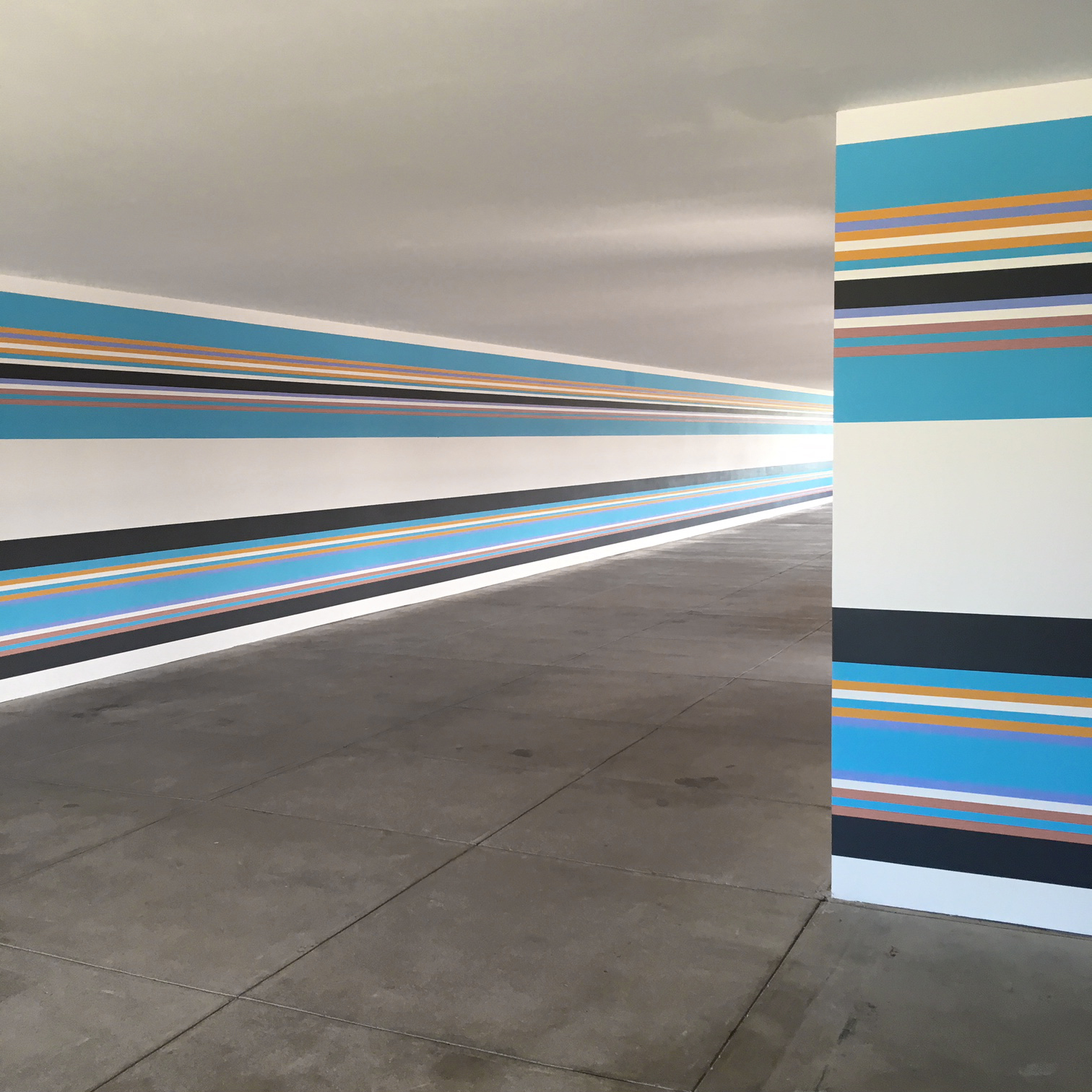
Bolt of Colour, 2017–2019. Installation view, Chinati Foundation, Marfa, Texas

Riley has painted temporary murals for the Tate, the Musée d'Art Moderne de la Ville de Paris and the National Gallery. In 2014, the Imperial College Healthcare Charity Art Collection commissioned her to make a permanent 56-metre mural for St Mary's Hospital, London; the work was installed on the 10th floor of the hospital's Queen Elizabeth Queen Mother Wing, joining two others she had painted more than 20 years earlier. Between 2017 and 2019 Riley completed a large wall painting for the Chinati Foundation, Marfa, Texas. This was the largest work she had yet undertaken, covering six of the building's eight walls. The mural referenced her Bolt of Colour of 1983, for the Royal Liverpool University Hospital and made use of a similar palette of Egyptian colours.

=== On the nature and role of the artist ===
Riley made the following comments regarding artistic work in her lecture Painting Now, 23rd William Townsend Memorial Lecture, Slade School of Fine Art, London, 26 November 1996:

Beckett interprets Proust as being convinced that such a text cannot be created or invented but can only be discovered within the artist himself, and that it is, as it were, almost a law of his own nature. It is his most precious possession, and, as Proust explains, the source of his innermost happiness. However, as can be seen from the practice of the great artists, although the text may be strong and durable and able to support a lifetime's work, it cannot be taken for granted and there is no guarantee of permanent possession. It may be mislaid or even lost, and retrieval is very difficult. It may lie dormant, and be discovered late in life after a long struggle, as with Mondrian or Proust himself. Why it should be that some people have this sort of text while others do not, and what 'meaning' it has, is not something which lends itself to argument. Nor is it up to the artist to decide how important it is, or what value it has for other people. To ascertain this is perhaps beyond even the capacities of an artist's own time.

=== Writer and curator ===
Riley has written on artists from Nicolas Poussin to Bruce Nauman. She co-curated Piet Mondrian: From Nature to Abstraction (with Sean Rainbird) at the Tate Gallery in 1996. Alongside art historian Robert Kudielka, Riley also served as curator of the 2002 exhibition "Paul Klee: The Nature of Creation", an exhibition at the Hayward Gallery in London in 2002. In 2010, she curated an artists choice show at the National Gallery in London, choosing large figure paintings by Titian, Veronese, El Greco, Rubens, Poussin, and Paul Cézanne.

== Exhibitions ==
In 1965, Riley exhibited in the Museum of Modern Art in New York City show, The Responsive Eye (created by curator William C. Seitz); the exhibition which first drew worldwide attention to her work and the Op Art movement. Her painting Current, 1964, was reproduced on the cover of the show's catalogue. The absence of copyright protection for artists in the United States at the time, saw her work exploited by commercial concerns which caused her to become disillusioned with such exhibitions. Legislation was eventually passed, following an initiative by New York-based artists, in 1967.

She participated in documentas IV (1968) and VI (1977). In 1968, Riley represented Great Britain in the Venice Biennale, where she was the first British contemporary painter, and the first woman, to be awarded the International Prize for painting. Her disciplined work lost ground to the assertive gestures of the Neo-Expressionists in the 1980s, but a 1999 show at the Serpentine Gallery of her early paintings triggered a resurgence of interest in her optical experiments. "Bridget Riley: Reconnaissance", an exhibition of paintings from the 1960s and 1970s, was presented at Dia:Chelsea in 2000. In 2001, she participated in Site Santa Fe, and in 2003 the Tate Britain organised a major Riley retrospective. In 2005, her work was featured at Gallery Oldham. Between November 2010 and May 2011, her exhibition "Paintings and Related Work" was presented at the National Gallery, London.

In June and July 2014, the retrospective show "Bridget Riley: The Stripe Paintings 1961–2014" was presented at the David Zwirner Gallery in London. In July and August 2015, the retrospective show "Bridget Riley: The Curve Paintings 1961–2014" was presented at the De La Warr Pavilion in Bexhill-on-Sea.

In November 2015, the exhibition Bridget Riley opened at David Zwirner in New York. The show features paintings and works on paper by the artist from 1981 to present; the fully illustrated catalogue features an essay by the art historian Richard Shiff and biographical notes compiled by Robert Kudielka.

A retrospective exhibition at the Scottish National Gallery, in partnership with the Hayward Gallery, ran from June to September 2019. It showed early paintings and drawings, black-and-white works of the 1960s, and studies that reveal her working methods. This major exhibition of her work, spanning her 70-year career, was also shown at Hayward Gallery from October 2019 to January 2020.

Riley's work was included in the 2021 exhibition Women in Abstraction at the Centre Pompidou.

In May 2023 Riley's first ceiling painting, Verve, was unveiled at The British School at Rome.

In 2023 Riley was the subject of an exhibition, Bridget Riley Drawings: From the Artist’s Studio, at the Morgan Library & Museum.

Riley was a featured artist in the 2024 exhibition 'Friend, A Survey of Op-Art and Minimalism' at the Ki Smith Gallery. The exhibition benefitted Sentebale, a Lesotho based charity co-founded by Prince Harry and Prince Seeiso. Riley exhibited alongside Agnes Martin and Frank Stella, among others.

From October 21, 2025 – January 25, 2026, the Musée d'Orsay exhibited Bridget Riley: Starting Point, "explores how Bridget Riley’s study of Georges Seurat’s work served as a defining moment in the development of her artistic process."

From November 22, 2025 – May 4, 2026, the Turner Contemporary exhibited Bridget Riley: Learning to See.

== Public collections ==
- Abbot Hall Art Gallery, Kendal
- Art Institute of Chicago
- Arts Council Collection, London
- British Council Collection, London
- Dallas Museum of Art
- Ferens Art Gallery, Hull
- Fitzwilliam Museum, Cambridge
- Glasgow Museums Resource Centre
- Government Art Collection, London
- Hammer Museum, Los Angeles
- Leeds Art Gallery
- Maclaurin Art Gallery at Rozelle House, Ayr
- Manchester Art Gallery
- Moderna Museet, Stockholm
- Morley College, London
- Museum Boijmans Van Beuningen, Rotterdam
- Museum of Fine Arts, Boston
- Museum of Modern Art, New York
- National Museum Cardiff, Amgueddfa Cymru – Museum Wales
- Nelson-Atkins Museum of Art, Kansas City
- Ruth Borchard Collection, London
- Scottish National Gallery, Edinburgh
- Southampton City Art Gallery
- Tate, London
- University of Warwick
- Walker Art Gallery, Liverpool
- The Whitworth, Manchester

== Influence ==
Movement in Squares, 1961, was the subject of a 2013 plagiarism debate between Riley and Tobias Rehberger.

Artists Ross Bleckner and Philip Taaffe made paintings paying homage to the work of Riley in the 80s. In 2013, Riley claimed that a wall-sized, black-and-white checkerboard work by Tobias Rehberger plagiarised her painting Movement in Squares and asked for it to be removed from display at the Berlin State Library's reading room.

== Recognition ==
In 1963, Riley was awarded the AICA Critics Prize as well as the John Moores, Liverpool Open Section Prize. A year later, she received a Peter Stuyvesant Foundation Travel bursary. In 1968, she received an International Painting Prize at the Venice Biennale. In 1974, she was named a Commander of the Most Excellent Order of the British Empire. Riley has been given honorary doctorates by Oxford (1993) and Cambridge (1995). In 2003, she was awarded the Praemium Imperiale, and, in 1998, she became one of only 65 Members of the Order of the Companions of Honour in the Commonwealth. As a board member of the National Gallery in the 1980s, she blocked Margaret Thatcher's plan to give an adjoining piece of property to developers and thus helped ensure the eventual construction of the museum's Sainsbury Wing. Riley has also received the Goslarer Kaiserring of the city of Goslar in 2009 and the 12th Rubens Prize of Siegen in 2012. Also in 2012, she became the first woman to receive the Sikkens Prize, the Dutch art prize recognising the use of colour.

== Philanthropy ==
Riley is a Patron of Paintings in Hospitals, a charity established in 1959 to provide art for health and social care in England, Wales and Northern Ireland.

Between 1987 and 2014, she created three murals across the eighth, ninth and tenth floors of the Queen Elizabeth Queen Mother Wing, St Mary's Hospital, London.

Since 2016 the Bridget Riley Art Foundation has funded the Bridget Riley Fellowship at the British School at Rome.

In 2017, alongside Yoko Ono and Tracey Emin, Riley donated artworks to an auction to raise money for Modern Art Oxford.

== Art market ==
- 2006, Untitled (Diagonal Curve) (1966), a black-and-white canvas of dizzying curves, was bought by Jeffrey Deitch at Sotheby's for $2.1 million, nearly three times its $730,000 high estimate and also a record for the artist.
- February 2008, the artist's dotted canvas Static 2 (1966) brought £1,476,500 ($2.9 million), far exceeding its £900,000 ($1.8 million) high estimate, at Christie's in London.
- July 2008, Chant 2 (1967), part of the trio shown in the Venice Biennale, went to a private American collector for £2,561,250 ($5.1 million), at Sotheby's.
- March 2022, Gala (1974) sold for £4,362,000 ($5.8 million) at the 2022 Modern British Art Evening Sale in Christie's, London.

== Bibliography ==
- Bridget Riley A Very Very Person: The Early Years (London: Ridinghouse, 2019). Text by Paul Moorhouse. ISBN 978-1-909932-50-0
- Bridget Riley: The Stripe Paintings 1961–2014 (New York: David Zwirner Books, 2014). Texts by Robert Kudielka, Paul Moorhouse, and Richard Shiff. ISBN 978-0-9899809-7-5
- Bridget Riley: The Stripe Paintings 1961–2012 (London: Ridinghouse; Berlin: Holzwarth Publications and Galerie Max Hetzler, 2013). Texts by John Elderfield, Robert Kudielka and Paul Moorhouse.
- Bridget Riley: Works 1960–1966 (London: Ridinghouse, 2012). Bridget Riley in conversation with David Sylvester (1967) and with Maurice de Sausmarez (1967).
- Bridget Riley: Complete Prints 1962–2012 (London: Ridinghouse, 2012). Essays by Lynn MacRitchie and Craig Hartley; edited by Karsten Schubert.
- The Eye's Mind: Bridget Riley. Collected Writings 1965–1999 (London: Thames & Hudson, Serpentine Gallery and De Montfort University, 1999). Includes conversations with Alex Farquharson, Mel Gooding, Vanya Kewley, Robert Kudielka, and David Thompson. Edited by Robert Kudielka.
- Bridget Riley: Paintings from the 60s and 70s (London: Serpentine Gallery, 1999). With texts by Lisa Corrin, Robert Kudielka, and Frances Spalding.
- Bridget Riley: Selected Paintings 1961–1999 (Düsseldorf: Kunstverein für die Rheinlande und Westfalen; Ostfildern: Cantz Publishers, 1999). With texts by Michael Krajewski, Robert Kudielka, Bridget Riley, Raimund Stecker, and conversations with Ernst H. Gombrich and Michael Craig-Martin.
- Bridget Riley: Works 1961–1998 (Kendal, Cumbria: Abbot Hall Art Gallery and Museum, 1998). A conversation with Isabel Carlisle.
- Bridget Riley: Dialogues on Art (London: Zwemmer, 1995). Conversations with Michael Craig-Martin, Andrew Graham Dixon, Ernst H. Gombrich, Neil MacGregor, and Bryan Robertson. Edited by Robert Kudielka and with an introduction by Richard Shone.
- Bridget Riley: Paintings and Related Work (London: National Gallery Company Limited, 2010). Text by Colin Wiggins, Michael Bracewell, Marla Prather and Robert Kudielka. ISBN 978-1-85709-497-8.
- Follin, Frances (2004). Embodied Visions: Bridget Riley, Op Art and the Sixties. Thames & Hudson. ISBN 978-0-50-097643-2.
