= Clothkits =

Clothing company

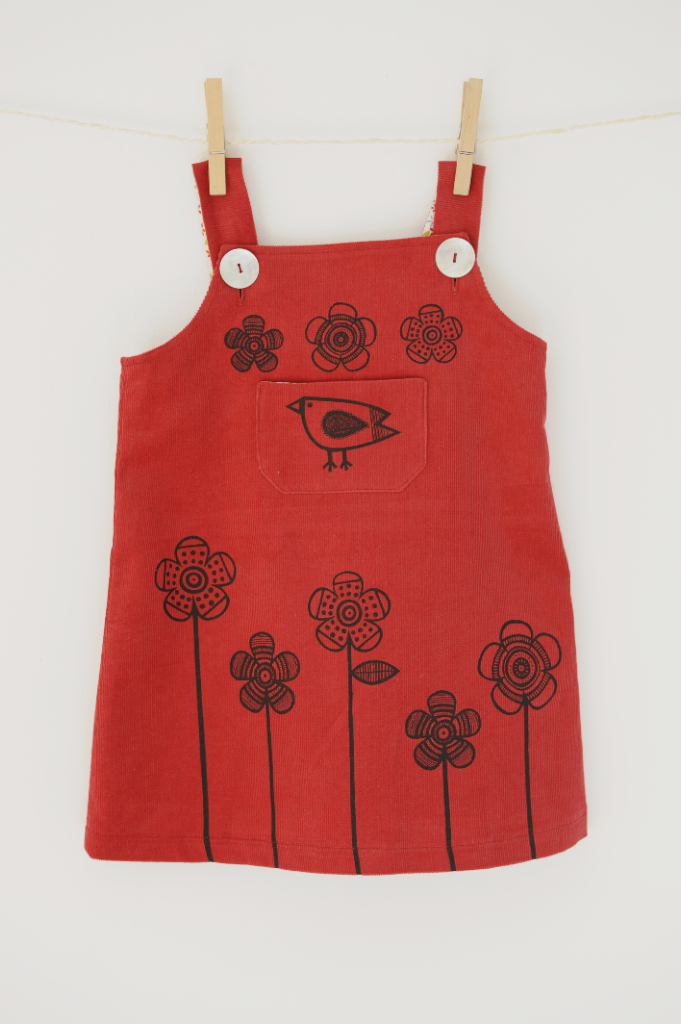
2007-08 Clothkits baby dress, red.

Clothkits is an English clothing and craft company, based in Chichester, West Sussex who sell kit clothing, dressmaking kits, haberdashery, sewing machines and all manner of other sewing supplies. In addition to this bricks and mortar retail outlet, the company have a large online business, and teach dressmaking classes from their contemporary sewing studio.

Clothkits specialize in selling colourful pre-printed kit clothing for children and adults, dolls and accessories. Notable are the padded jacket kits for children with small stuffed animals to pop in pockets for toys on the go. The signature Clothkits printed kit comprises a pattern printed onto the fabric so that it can be cut out and assembled without needing to pin a paper pattern. The kits are also notable for containing all the materials needed to complete the garment or project. Other kits are sold that use a traditional paper patterns with fabric and notions.

Clothkits was originally based in Lewes, East Sussex. Founded as a mail order business by Anne Kennedy in 1969 and sold in 1988, Clothkits at one stage employed 400 workers and had 7 shops. Clothkits was owned then by Freemans, a larger mail order catalogue business, and was temporarily made dormant in 1991.

Back in the 1970s and 1980s kits were designed under the guidance of Janet Kennedy. The spare fabric around the pieces of the main pattern sometimes feature a doll sized pattern for the same garment. As well as the printed kits, at one time they sold ready-made clothing and coordinating knitted items such as jumpers and tights.

The Clothkits brand was bought in 2007 by artist Kay Mawer and the company relaunched in early 2008. Clothkits continue to produce kit clothing in this original concept. Collaborations with contemporary artists and designers form the core of the business, and partnerships include with screen printer Jane Foster, papercut artist Rob Ryan and designers People Will Always Need Plates. Such kits have seen renewed interest due to concerns about the sustainability of ready-to-wear fast fashion.

== Continue reading ==
- Ford, Janet (1988). The Indebted Society: Credit and Default in the 1980s. London: Routledge. p. 16.
