= North London Collegiate School =

Independent day school for girls in London

Coordinates: 51°36′54″N 0°17′41″W

Location
- Canons Drive; Edgware, Middlesex, HA8 7RJ; England

Information
- Type: Private day school for girls in London; Private coeducational boarding school in South Korea
- Motto: in spe laboramus
- Established: 1850; 176 years ago
- Founder: Frances Mary Buss
- Local authority: Harrow
- Chair of the Governors: Gabrielle Gower, OBE
- Headmistress: Vicky Bingham
- Gender: Girls (UK), girls and boys (South Korea)
- Age: 4 to 18
- Enrolment: 1,066 (2008)
- Houses: Angus, Lindsay, Gibbons, Collet, Aitken
- Colour: Sky blue Brown
- Alumnae: Old North Londoners (ONLs)
- Website: www.nlcs.org.uk

North London Collegiate School (NLCS) is a private day school for girls in England. Founded in Camden Town, it is now in Edgware, in the London Borough of Harrow. Associate schools are in South Korea's Jeju Island, Dubai, Vietnam, Singapore and Kobe, Japan, all of which are coeducational day and boarding schools offering the British curriculum. It is a member of the Girls' Schools Association.

North London Collegiate School is consistently ranked among the top independent schools in the United Kingdom. In the 2025 edition of The Times Parent Power league table, NLCS was ranked within the top 10 schools overall in the UK, and among the top 3 girls' schools nationally, based on academic results at GCSE and A-level.

In the 2026 The Sunday Times Parent Power Guide, North London Collegiate School was named the "Independent Secondary School of the Year".

== Location ==
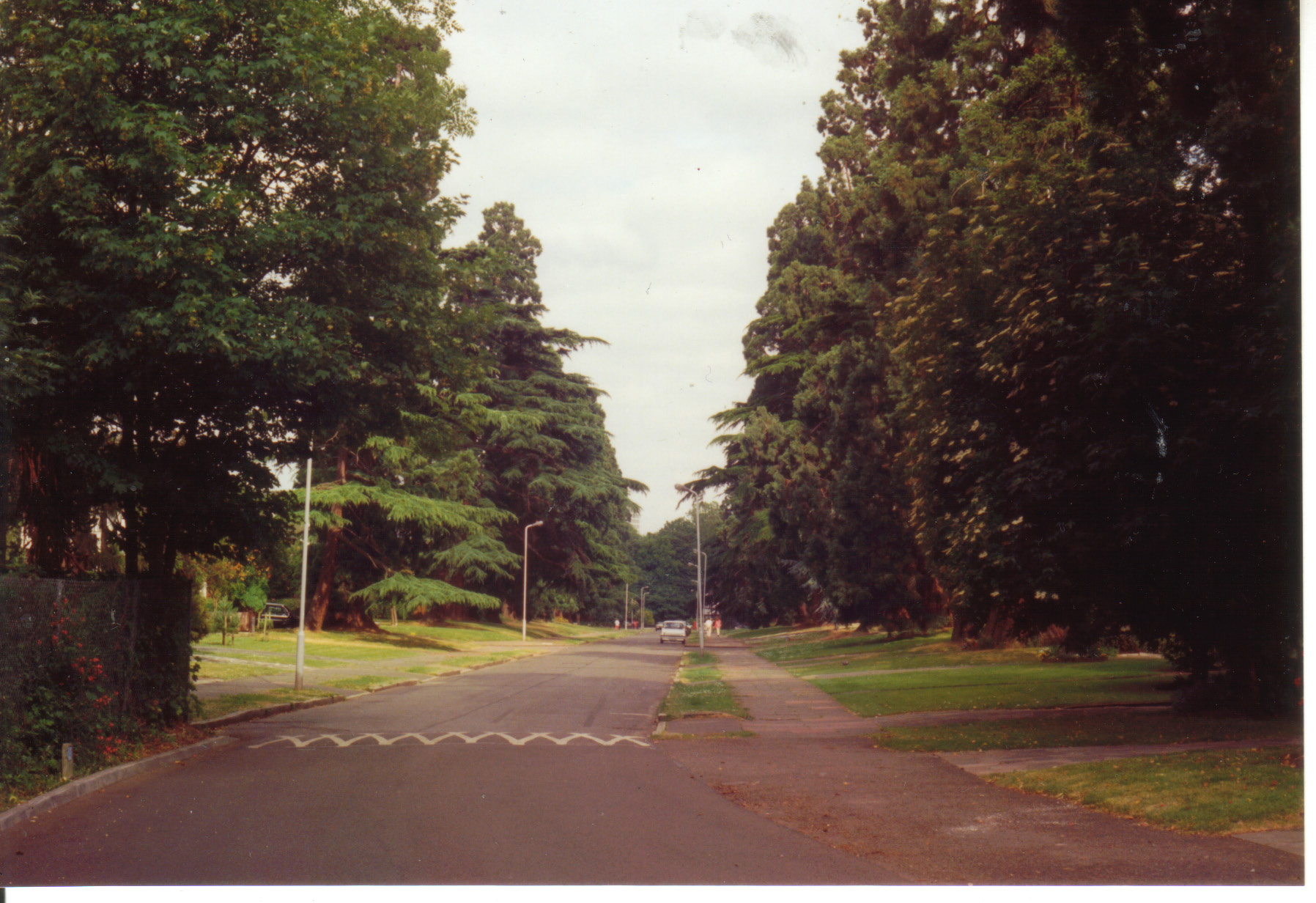
Canons Drive

North London Collegiate School is at the western edge of Edgware near Canons Park. It is accessed via Canons Drive from Edgware High Street. Stanmore tube station and Canons Park tube station are within walking distance.

== History ==
=== Formation ===
North London Collegiate School was founded by Frances Buss, a pioneer in girls' education. It is generally recognised as the first girls' school in the United Kingdom to offer girls the same educational opportunities as boys.

The school opened in 1850 at No.46. later renumbered No.12 Camden Street, London.

Buss believed in the importance of home life and it remained a day school. In 1929, the school bought Canons, a modest villa built by William Hallett Esq, on the site of a palatial residence originally built in the early 18th century by the Duke of Chandos, and relocated to the property (designed by Sir Albert Richardson) in 1940.

Lucinda Elizabeth Shaw, mother to George Bernard Shaw was a director of music at the school, followed in 1908 by Lilian Manson, J.B. Manson's wife. Her ambitious revival of Purcell's Dido and Aeneas in 1910 gained coverage in The Times.

=== Second World War ===
The school was evacuated to Luton High School, a girls' school, what is now Denbigh High School, Luton.

=== Expansion ===
Today the school takes girls from ages 4 to 18. It has a junior school (reception to Year 6) and senior school (Year 7–13).

The co-ed boarding North London Collegiate School Jeju opened in Seogwipo, South Korea in 2011.North London Collegiate School Dubai opened in September 2017 as one of NLCS's international schools and its first campus in the Middle East. The school was established in Mohammed Bin Rashid Al Maktoum City, within the Sobha Hartland development, as a co-educational day school offering the International Baccalaureate curriculum. Daniel Lewis, who had worked at North London Collegiate School in London for fourteen years, was appointed as the founding principal of NLCS Dubai and led the school during its launch period.

Following an investigation into allegations of alleged malpractice in setting teacher-assessed grades A-levels in 2021, the school announced that "there [had] been no finding of [school] malpractice" with The Guardian reporting confidential sources that "while some of the malpractice allegations have been dismissed, others have been upheld by the [exam board] committees".

== Curriculum ==
North London Collegiate has been an International Baccalaureate World School since October 2003. Girls may choose to take the traditional A Levels or the IB curriculum.

== Headmistresses ==
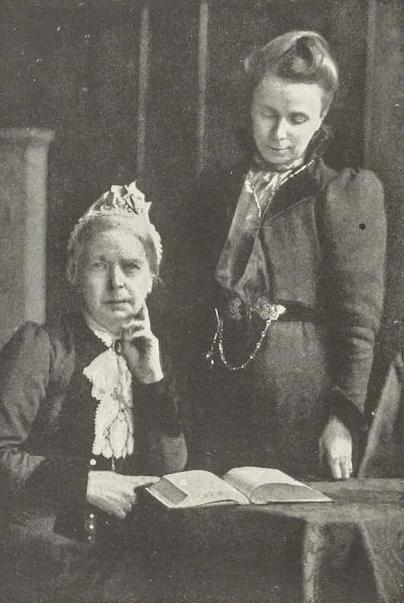
Frances Mary Buss and Sophie Bryant in 1900

- Frances Mary Buss (1850 – December 1894)
- Sophie Bryant (1895–1918)
- Isabella Drummond (1918–1940, previously Head of Camden School)
- Eileen Harold (1941–1944)
- Dame Kitty Anderson (1945–1965)
- Madeline McLauchlan (1965 – December 1985, previously at Henrietta Barnett School)
- Joan Clanchy (1986–1997) previously Head of St George's School, Edinburgh
- Bernice McCabe (1997–2017, previously at Chelmsford County High School)
- Sarah Clark (2018–2022, previously at Queen's School, Chester)
- Vicky Bingham (2023–present, previously at South Hampstead High School)

== Notable alumnae ==
=== 19th century ===
- Catherine Alice Raisin (1855–1945) (geologist and educationist)
- Sara Burstall (1859-1939) (teacher, headmistress) (headmistress of Manchester High School for Girls)
- Clara Collet (1860-1948) (civil servant and promoter of women's education and employment)
- Margaret Theodora Meyer (1862–1924) (mathematician)
- Ethel Sargant (1863–1918) (botanist)
- Amy Horrocks (1867-1919) (composer)
- Lilian Lindsay [née Murray] (1871–1960) (first female dentist)
- Gabrielle Howard (1876–1930) (plant physiologist)
- Agnes Arber [née Robertson] (1879–1960) (botanist)
- Eva Germaine Rimington Taylor (1879–1966) (geographer and historian of science)
- Marie Stopes (1880–1958)(palaeobotanist, birth control advocate)
- Margaret Calkin James (1895–1985) (graphic designer and artist)
- Eleanor Graham (1896–1984) (publisher and children's writer)

=== 1900 – 1945 ===
- Stella Gibbons (1902–1989) (novelist)
- Stevie Smith (1902–1971) (poet)
- Peggy Angus (1904-1993)
- Helen Gardner (1908-1986) (academic/writer)
- Myfanwy Piper [née Evans] (1911–1997) (librettist)
- Fenella Fielding (1927-2018) (actress)
- Marilyn Malin (1935/66-2022) (publisher, editor and literary agent)
- Eleanor Bron (b.1938) (actress)
- Barbara Amiel (b.1940) (journalist)
- Esther Rantzen (b.1940) (television personality)
- Gillian Cross (b.1945) (children's writer)

=== 1946-1999 ===
- Susie Orbach (b.1946) (psychologist/journalist)
- Ruth Padel (b.1946) (poet)
- Alison Britton (b.1948) (ceramicist)
- Anna Wintour (b.1949) (fashion journalist; editor of Vogue)
- Angela Tilby (b.1950) (author, Anglican priest and Canon Emeritus at Christ Church, Oxford)
- Judith Weir (b.1954) (composer)
- Margaret Fingerhut (b.1955) (pianist)
- Victoria Sharp (b.1956) (President of the King's Bench Division)
- Jo Coburn (b.1967) BBC political broadcaster
- Noreena Hertz (b.1967) (academic)
- Emily Lawson (b.1966/67) (business executive and civil servant)
- Gillian Tett (b.1967) (journalist)
- Rachel Weisz (b.1970) (actress)
- Jo Dunkley (b.1979/80) (Professor of Physics at Princeton University)
- Roma Agrawal (b.1983/84) (engineer)
- Anna Popplewell (b.1988) (actress)

== Notable former staff ==
- Edith Aitken (founding head of Pretoria High School for Girls)
- Peggy Angus (artist, tile and wallpaper designer), teacher 1947-70
- Edward Aveling, teacher of elementary physics and botany (1872–1876)
- Hannah Robertson, led middle school, later tutor of women at Leeds University from 1905 to 1921.

== Bibliography ==
- The North London Collegiate School 1850–1950: A Hundred Years of Girls' Education Includes 'Essays in honour of the Frances Mary Buss Foundation' together with an appendix section that includes Royal Patrons, The School Prospectus, Prize Day List, Links to Girton College and the University of London, and regulations concerning Prefects and Monitors. Published by OUP (Oxford University Press) in 1950 with 231 pages, including the index. (No author or Editor)
- "And Their Works Do Follow Them" by Watson, Nigel London, James & James, 2000 ISBN 0907383300
- Cockburn, J S; King, H P F; McDonnell, K G T, eds. (1969). "Schools: The North London Collegiate School". A History of the County of Middlesex: Volume 1, Physique, Archaeology, Domesday, Ecclesiastical Organization, the Jews, Religious Houses, Education of Working Classes To 1870, Private Education From Sixteenth Century. Victoria County History (via British History Online). pp. 308–310.
