= Tom Hudson (art educator) =

British artist and lecturer

- Born: 3 July 1922; Horden, Co Durham
- Died: 27 December 1997 (aged 75); Bristol
- Known for: Promotion of Basic Design in UK Art Colleges

Tom Hudson (3 July 1922 – 27 December 1997) was a British artist and lecturer. He created sculptures using modern materials such as perspex and resin and considered that Art could be a means of changing society. His greatest influence was on Art teaching. He was a foremost proponent of the Bauhaus concept of teaching Art and Design by Basic Design, taking that principle to Art Colleges across the UK in the 1950s, 60s and 70s. This came to be the Art foundation course which provide an holistic grounding for Art and Design students before taking higher education qualifications.

== Early career and artistic influences ==
Bauhaus Basic design program

Tom Hudson was born in Horden, County Durham into a working-class family with strong socialist ideals. He went to Hartlepool's Henry Smith Grammar School and developed an interest in Art while undertaking National Service overseas. He attended Sunderland School of Art, teacher training at King's College, Newcastle then studied 20th Century Art at the Courtauld Institute, London. During this time he was influenced by Herbert Read and the Constructivist and de Stijl movements, particularly with the concepts of Education through Art. His first permanent teaching post was as painting master at Lowestoft School of Art in 1951.

Hudson's interest and research into children's art brought him into contact with Victor Pasmore and Harry Thubron who were developing courses inspired by Bauhaus Basic Design.

== Later life ==
In 1957 Hudson moved to a post in Leeds College of Art where he helped to develop the content of Basic Design courses further. He not only taught students, but also ran summer schools for secondary school Art teachers in Scarborough and Barry with his colleague Harry Thubron. He progressed to become Head of Foundation Studies at Leicester College of Art. During the early 1960s he had become a UNESCO consultant, advisor to the Brazilian Government on Art Education and lecturing worldwide. However, in 1964 he was appointed to Cardiff College of Art as Director of Studies where he took the unusual step of bringing his staff and best students from Leicester to Cardiff. Under his control Cardiff College of Art become globally renowned for its radical teaching programmes.

He left Cardiff in 1977 to become Dean of Education at Emily Carr College of Art and Design in Vancouver. His belief that ordinary people should be able to understand the artistic, scientific and technological advances of the 20th Century led him to make the television programmes Mark and Image(1988) and Material and Form (1991) which won awards in North America. He was first and foremost an educator rather than a practitioner, retiring in 1987
