= Byam Shaw School of Art =

Former art school in London, England

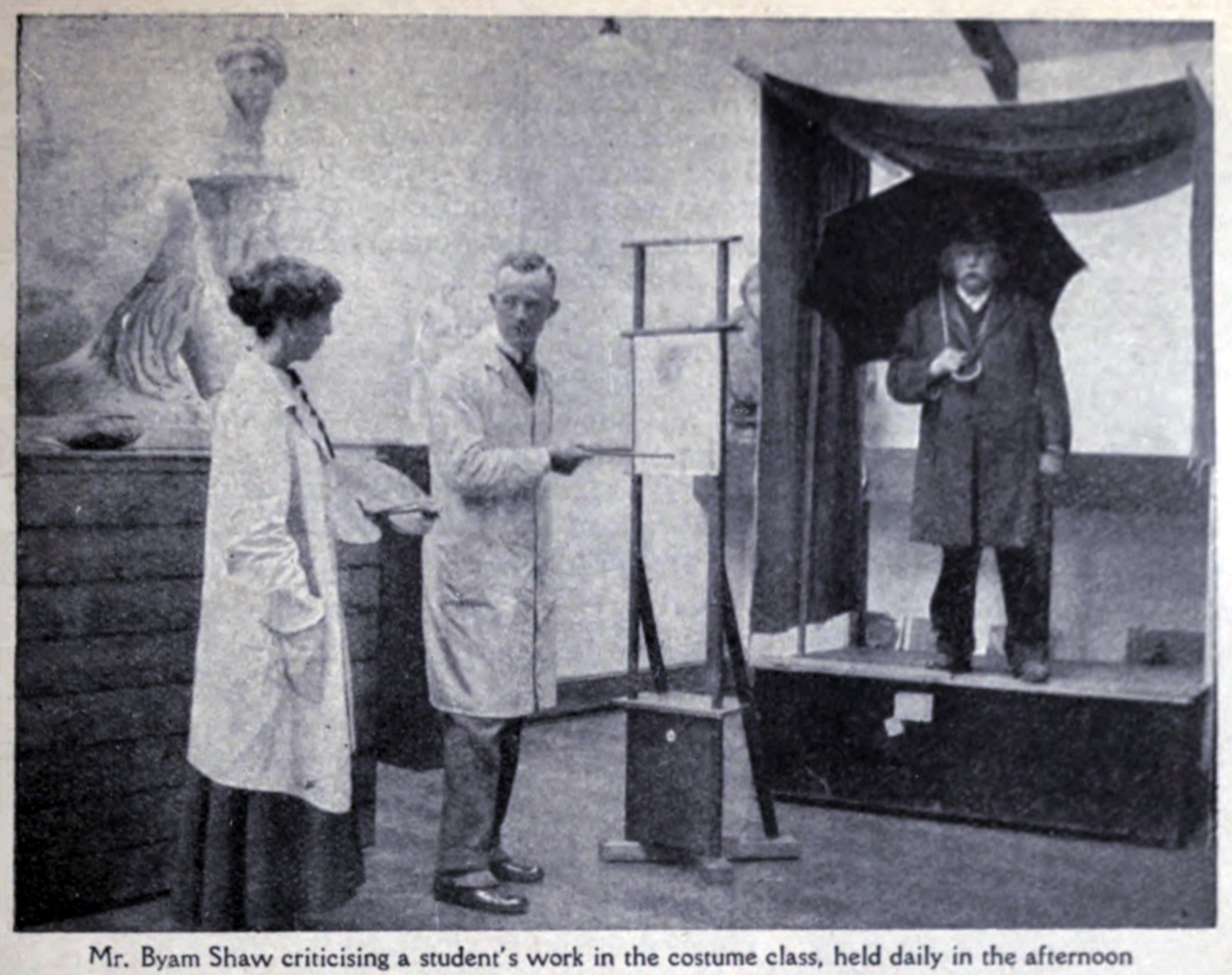
- Byam Shaw criticising a student's work in the costume class in the early days of the school
- Active: 1910–2003
- Location: London, United Kingdom; 51.5066°N 0.1964°W
- Campus: 70 Campden Street, Kensington

The Byam Shaw School of Art, often known simply as Byam Shaw, was an independent art school in London, England. It specialised in fine art and offered foundation and degree-level courses. It was founded in 1910 by John Liston Byam Shaw and Rex Vicat Cole. In 2003 it was absorbed by Central Saint Martins College of Arts and Design.

== History ==
The Byam Shaw was opened in May 1910 by John Liston Byam Shaw and Rex Vicat Cole with the name Byam Shaw and Vicat Cole School of Art. The teaching staff initially consisted of W. Dacres Adams, D. Murray Smith and C. Austin Cooper; additional lectures were given by Evelyn Eunice Pyke-Nott (Mrs. Byam Shaw), Kenneth Martin and Percival Silley. Other early members of the staff were Ernest Jackson, who was principal of the school from 1926 to 1940, and the late Pre-Raphaelite painter Eleanor Fortescue-Brickdale. Brian Thomas was principal from 1946 to 1954, and Maurice de Sausmarez from 1962 to 1969.

The original premises were at 70 Campden Street, London W8; the school moved in 1990 to larger premises in Archway. In 2003, it was absorbed into Central Saint Martins College of Arts and Design.

== Alumni ==
Among those who studied at the Byam Shaw School of Art are artists such as Winifred Nicholson, Bernard Dunstan, Yinka Shonibare, Mona Hatoum, the stained glass artist Evie Hone and the wood-engraver Blair Hughes-Stanton; theatre designers including Maria Björnson, Laurence Irving and Stefanos Lazaridis; the inventor James Dyson; the actor John Standing; and the musician Paul Simonon.
