= Space Studios =

Artist studio organisation in London

Space Studios, founded by Bridget Riley and Peter Sedgley in 1968, is the oldest continuously operating artists' studio organisation in London. In addition to providing studios to artists across the city, Space operates a recognised exhibition programme, international residencies and a community-facing learning and participation platform.

Space's founding in 1968, with temporary studios in St Katharine Docks, initiated an efflorescence of artist studio complexes in East End boroughs over four decades, which included Acme Studios, Chisenhale Studios, Delfina Studios and many others. SPACE has also had studio buildings in Camden, Deptford, Barking, Soho, and Islington. The concentration of artists that these studio complexes brought to the East End laid the groundwork for the area's cultural profile which led, from the 1990s onwards, to its claim of having the largest concentration of artists in Europe.

Space is a registered charity supported by the Arts Council England which runs a variety of education projects and provides studios for over 700 artists at 17 sites across London.

== History ==
In 1965 Riley and Sedgley had visited a range of artist studios in semi-industrial warehouse buildings in New York, including those of Ellsworth Kelly and Agnes Martin, when the two artists were included in the Museum of Modern Art’s exhibition The Responsive Eye. The idea for SPACE emerged from AIR (Artist Information Registry). Co-founder Peter Sedgley was first interested in establishing an agency that would document the work of artists and collate it into a professional ‘registry’ that would be open to anyone interested in the work of contemporary artists.

In 1968, Sedgley and Riley secured a two-year lease on the ‘I-site’ building in St Katharine Docks for the purpose of artists studios at £500 a year after which it was due to be developed. The building was to house SPACE and AIR. SPACE provided affordable studio space to artists in need; and AIR catalogued slides and exhibition information on any artist who wanted to be a part of it and made this available to interested parties—dealers, curators, collectors. Joining SPACE and AIR were a selection of smaller organisations that needed support of space including Pavilions in the Park and the Printmakers Council. Initial funding for the venture was given by the artist Henry Moore, who donated his prize from the Erasmus Foundation, and grants were given by the Calouste Gulbenkian Foundation and the Arts Council of Great Britain. Riley and Sedgley were joined by Peter Townsend, Professor Tony West and the actress Irene Worth on the management committee.

Artists were selected on a first-come, first-served basis considering the appropriateness of the available studio space to their practice. The model that SPACE established was not original and there was an existing group of sculptors working in Stockwell Depot, a disused warehouse near Stockwell Underground Station as well as the previously mentioned informal group of New York studios in the Battery. But SPACE was the first legally organised artist studio complex in London to draw on the wealth of disused semi-industrial warehouse space that was growing in number with the global collapse of shipping and industry. After looking initially at the empty Marshalsea prison in Southwark, the warehouse in St Katharine Dock became the "pilot for the redevelopment of London's Docklands."

Space and AIR relinquished their tenancy of the St. Katharine Dock space at the end of 1970 and moved artists into two new spaces, Martello Street studios in Hackney and a former school in Stepney Green. Martello Street remains SPACE's oldest studio building. This began a long and continuing history of leasing buildings for artists’ studios from a range of public and private landlords, seeking to find the best deals to allow the space to be rented affordably to artists.

In 1974, SPACE and AIR officially incorporated as a company limited by guarantee with charitable status, under the umbrella of A.S.G. (Arts Services Grants, Ltd.) The charity's first Open Studio event took place in 1975, with 14 studio buildings across East, South and North London participating. The event, unique at the time, would grow and expand in popularity over the next twenty years eventually joining with the Whitechapel Open.

Space expanded its studio provision through the 70s and early 80s with the support of studio conversion grants given by the Arts Council and funding from private foundations. With the threat of Arts Council cuts and the uncertainty of the organisation's transfer to the Greater London Arts Association (GLAA) in 1986, SPACE organised the Friends of AIR and SPACE as an independent fundraising group for the organisation. The Friends brought significant funding to the organisations through the 1980s with monies raised through subscriptions and events. A.S.G. board chair Nancy Balfour (1982 – 1989), the influential American journalist and art collector, took an active role in the Friends from the start and remained involved and personally supportive even after leaving her position on SPACE's board.

Through the late 1980s and into the 90s, SPACE also effectively positioned itself as an important interface between commercial companies and public bodies, representing the interests of artists and the cultural community.

In 2020, SPACE and fellow artists' studios providers Second Floor Studios & Arts (SFSA) and Artists Studio Company (ASC) started London's Affordable Artists Studio Network (LAASN), a network of affordable artists studio providers in London, to advocate for the sector.

== Exhibitions ==
Noted for its focus on emerging art and historical projects, between 2009 and 2015 the exhibition programme at SPACE was curated by Paul Pieroni. The programme has featured exhibitions and projects by a diverse group of artists, including Bernadette Corporation, Raymond Pettibon, Destroy All Monsters, Jamie Shovlin, Kathy Acker, Nam June Paik, Lucky Dragons, Jo Spence, Roy Ascott, LuckyPDF, Mary Barnes, Stewart Home and Hex. In June 2012, SPACE in collaboration with Studio Voltaire, presented a major two-venue retrospective of British photographer Jo Spence.

== Residencies ==
Space have run several residency programmes in collaboration with the Goethe-Institut, IASPIS, and the Creative Space residency at Arlington in Camden. Artists from areas such as Brazil, France, Central Asia and Mexico have taken part in the programme which includes short-term and site-specific to year-long residencies.

== Space Publications ==
- Artists in the City: SPACE in ’68 and beyond, 2018. (ISBN 9781999927806)
- Adaptive Actions, ed. Jean-Francois Prost, 2009. (ISBN 978-0-9554060-4-1)
- 8 Artists Try Not to Talk About Art, 2006. (ISBN 0-9554060-0-5)
- Kelly Jazvac, Flop, 2009. (ISBN 978-0-9554060-5-8)
- Pamela Landry, Fixations, 2010. (ISBN 978-0-9554060-6-5)
- Space Cooks, 2002. (ASIN B001J03O0Y)
- The Cut, 2011. (ISBN 978-0-9554060-8-9)
- Emotional Cartography: Technologies of the self, 2009. (ISBN 978-0-9557623-1-4)
- Douglas Scholes, The Condition of Things, 2012. (ISBN 978-0-9554060-9-6)
