= Harry Thubron =

British painter (1915–1985)

Harry Thubron OBE (Henry James Thubron, 1915–1985) was an English artist and art teacher. He made radical innovations in art education which are still controversial today.

== Life ==
Thubron was born on 24 November 1915 at 7 Victoria Avenue, Bishop Auckland, Co. Durham, the son of Percy Thubron, journeyman joiner (and later a newsagent and tobacconist), and his wife, Martha Ada, née Thompson (d. 1929/30). His mother, who died when he was fourteen, would shut him away in a room to paint from the age of seven.

Having attended Henry Smith Grammar School, Hartlepool, he went on to Sunderland School of Art (1933–38) and to the Royal College of Art, London (1938–40). Thubron served in the British Armed Forces (1941–46) at the Army Bureau of Current Affairs Newsletter.

On 6 March 1940 he married, in Battersea, London, Joan Sawdon, a schoolteacher, daughter of Frank Sawdon, a hairdresser. Following his divorce in 1962, he married, on 4 August 1965 in Lancaster, Elma Askham, an artist and lecturer, daughter of William Marsh Askham.

In the 1978 Birthday Honours he was awarded the Order of the British Empire (OBE) for services in art education.

Thubron died at home in Lewisham, London in April 1985.

== Art ==
Thubron started to create figurative works, which soon changed to abstract, not only in painting, as in reliefs in wood, metal or resin. After 1965, he devoted himself mainly to collages and assemblages with materials found on the street, usually from industry.

Out of the turbulence of the years after his divorce Thubron produced comparatively few works of art, but these, based on a dialogue between old and new materials, and painting and collage, were treasured by friends and colleagues who rightly judged them to be sensitive and beautiful. With Dennis Harland as technical adviser he produced a fine relief in plastics for the exterior of the Branch College, Leeds (1963–4; removed), which fulfilled his ambition to make art for public, architectural settings. He showed work in Leeds at the Queen Square Gallery in 1967, and again that year with Elma Thubron. Later, in 1976, he showed paintings and collages at the Serpentine Gallery, London. He was also included in major surveys, among them 'British Art' at the Hayward Gallery, London, in 1974, and 'British Painting, 1952–77' at the Royal Academy, London, in 1977.

After 1969 he concentrated more on his own painting, and funded by an Arts Council grant spent the following year in Spain. He spent part of 1971 in Jamaica before beginning an association with Goldsmiths' College, New Cross, London, as part-time teacher. He continued making paintings and collages during the last eight years of his life, though experiencing ever-deteriorating health.

He lived his most creative time between London and the south of Spain, in the 70s and 80s, very interested in the work of Kurt Schwitters and Antoni Tàpies, and with particular admiration for Paul Klee, who advocated art as a means of self- development and self-discovery, combining experience and instinct in the creative act.

=== Works ===
Examples of his work are in the Tate collection in the Tate Britain, Leeds City Art Gallery, Leeds University Gallery, and the Museum of Hartlepool, co. Durham, among other regional and private collections.

== Teaching ==
Thubron's wartime experience of teaching soldiers via the text of the Army Council of Current Affairs Newsletter gave him a vision of a "new post-war world" and the rhetoric to achieve it. On demobilisation in 1946 he realised that in art also a new start was required. While teaching at Sunderland School of Art from 1946, he began to elaborate new courses (from 1948 onward), contributing (from 1954) to those directed by John Wood of North Riding county council, which allowed for greater innovation.

On his move north in 1956, Victor Pasmore also worked with wood. Pasmore had worked at the Central School of Arts and Crafts, London, on the basic design course, instigated in 1949 with William Johnstone and Arthur Halliwell. These developments owed much to the Vorkurs of the German Bauhaus, but Thubron was always careful to dissociate his own methods from those of others and in his own teaching insisted on freedom, openness, development, and research. These chosen phrases gave expression to his perception of rapid contemporary changes in technology and society, and he rejected the label "basic design" which he thought was given too freely to radical modernist teaching.

At Leeds Thubron also established close links between the art college and the School of Fine Art at the University of Leeds, which allowed the University's Gregory Fellows in Fine Art to start teaching at Leeds College of Art. He also helped to create a prototype for Britain's Polytechnics by sending his students to work on collaborative projects with engineering students from Leeds College of Technology, out of which Leeds Polytechnic was formed. This was also a time when Thubron organised a series of summer schools in Scarborough, North Yorkshire, through which his ideas on art education were shared with artists, art teachers and art students from all over the country, thereby spreading his philosophy. He taught these courses alongside colleagues such as Victor Pasmore, Wendy Pasmore, Tom Hudson and Maurice de Sausmarez.

In 1964 Thubron left Leeds and became a lecturer at Lancaster until 1966. He subsequently became Head of Painting at Leicester College of Art, although he only held this post for three years (until 1968) due to increasing ill health. He still continued some teaching after this, as a part-time tutor at Goldsmiths' College, London, between 1971 and 1982.

Thubron's specific innovations in art education are still controversial. While he is remembered for his warm personality and vivid use of the spoken word, an extensive documentary record of his work as a teacher is held in the National Art Archive, Bretton Hall, Yorkshire.

“If we, ourselves, don't take jobs in colleges, take leadership roles; then nothing will ever change." – Harry Thubron

=== Approach to education ===
During the 1950s and 60s Thubron was a familiar name in education for his pioneering experiments in post-school art education. He taught at Sunderland College of Art from 1950 to 1955, and then became Head of Fine Art at Leeds College of Art. During his ten-year tenure in Leeds he helped to revolutionise art education in England by establishing the Basic Design Course, a programme inspired by the German Bauhaus college and the theoretical writings of Herbert Read. In this programme, art and design students were not taught specific skills for any of the disciplines of art and design, but visual literacy in the use of colour, establishment of form and construction of space. Out of this, and similar experiments undertaken by Victor Pasmore and Richard Hamilton at Kings College Newcastle, a new introductory course for art, design and architecture students emerged, called the Foundation Course, which went on to become the standard degree course-entry qualification for art, design and architecture students in many countries, including Britain, Ireland, Canada and elsewhere.

Thubron also organised by this time a series of "summer schools" in Yorkshire and Norfolk, in which he shared his ideas on art education with teachers, students and artists who came from all over the country, markedly influencing an entire generation of creators as Hoyland, Sausmarez, Bridget Riley and Michael Kidner.

With Thubron, students first engaged in communal exercises making marks or collages on inexpensive paper laid on the floor in an atmosphere of invention. They experimented, for example, with families of forms whereby a square could by repeated modification become an oval; or, given a blob of red paint, a student would be directed to mix and place next to it on the paper what he or she perceived to be the most enhancing green. The traditional study of natural form as structure remained central to his students' development as did that of the human figure, but drawn in movement.

Thubron's strength of character could overdetermine student responses, and his enthusiasms yawed abruptly from philosophy to mathematical sculpture or to expressive painting. Young followers whom he appointed to the staff found themselves with much reading. With their preconceptions under assault by his methods and their ideas at the mercy of his forceful personality, some students, perhaps particularly women students, foundered.

== Credentials ==
=== Awards ===
- 1978 – Order of the British Empire; for contributions to the arts and art education

=== Career ===
- 1941-46 - Army Bureau of Current Affairs Newsletter.
- 1946–50 – professor of painting at West Hartlepool School of Art
- 1950-5 – Head of Fine Art, Sunderland College of Art
- 1955–64 – Head of Fine Art, Leeds College of Art
- 1964-5 – Head of Find Art, Lancaster College of Art
- 1965-6 – Visiting Professor at the University of Illinois, US
- 1966-8 - Head of Painting School at Leicer College of Art
- 1968-9 – Arts Council grant; visitor and adviser to International School in Spain
- 1969–70 – Director of Studies at the Kingston School of Art in Jamaica
- 1971-3 - Summer Schools, International School, Spain, Ronda
- 1971–1982 – part-time teaching, Fine Art Department, Goldsmiths' College London
- 1976 – awarded Arts Council Bursary

=== Lectures ===
Thubron lectured widely throughout Great Britain and the US (including at Harvard, Yale, Chicago, and Kansas City), 1965-6.

=== One-man exhibitions ===
- 1961 – Frauenfeld, Switzerland
- 1963 – University of Leeds
- 1964 – Lords Gallery, London
- 1965 – Lords Gallery, London
- 1967 - Queens Square Gallery, Leeds
- 1976 – Serpentine Gallery
- 1976 - Peterloo Gallery, Manchester (6–22 July)
- 1978 - Jordan Gallery, London
- 1980 - Harlow Play House, Harlow New Town
- 1981 - Ikon Gallery, Birmingham
- 1983 - Curwen Gallery, London

=== Publications ===
- Contributor to Times Educational Supplement 1956 and 1959
- The Developing Process, Durham University Press 1959
- Basic Research, Leeds; The Case for Polytechnics, Elma Askham and Harry Thubron, Studio International, September 1967
- Looking Forward, an interview with Harry and Elma Thubron
- Jamica Journal 1970

=== Films ===
- Drawing with the Figure, 1963 (copies with British Film Institute, American Universities Museum of Modern Art, New York)
- Al Sherry Trifle – No Bread, 1965, a pedagogical essay in fundamental structures
- A 45-minute film of course work at Jamaica School of Art, made by Jamaican Information Services and shown on television 1970
- Summer School held by Harry Thubron 1981 -

=== Public collections ===
Thubron's work exists in many public and private collections worldwide, including:

- Gulbenkian Foundation
- Arts Council of Great Britain
- British Council
- Contemporary Art Society
- Tate Gallery
- University of Warwick
- Leeds Art College

== Notable students ==
Notable students of Thubron include Bridget Riley, Albert Irvin, David Hockney, Stass Paraskos and Allen Fisher. Paraskos went on to establish the Cyprus College of Art, on the Mediterranean island of Cyprus using Thubron's theories, and this institution still exists as a "Thubronite" art institution today. Fisher went on to become Professor Poetry and Painting at Roehampton University and then Professor of Poetry and Art at Manchester Metropolitan University.
