= Ascentis =

Ascentis is a national qualification-awarding body based in Lancaster in the North West of England. It was formerly called the Open College of the North West, or OCNW.

Formed in 1975 as a partnership between Lancaster University,Preston Polytechnic (now the University of Central Lancashire) and Nelson and Colne College, the Open College of the North West was developed to accredit courses of learning aimed at adult returners to education with the aim of helping them progress to university education. The success of these early programmes quickly led to other colleges and universities becoming involved and the idea being replicated across the country by other regional 'Open Colleges'. These early courses have now developed into the QAA-approved Access to HE Diploma, which most universities accept as an alternative to GCSEs and A Levels for adult applicants.

With the introduction of the Learning and Skills Act of 2000 funding for adult education changed, and some of OCNW's qualifications became ineligible for continued public funding. All awarding bodies requesting access to public funds were required to gain approval from the QCA (now Ofqual): OCNW obtained this approval in 2001, but, unusually, retained its status as a QAA Access Validating Agency as well. A full list of Ascentis's Ofqual approved qualifications can be found on the official list of approved qualifications, i.e. the National Database of Accredited Qualifications (NDAQ).

OCNW was the only Open College to become a National Awarding Body; the other regional Open Colleges formed and joined the National Open College Network (NOCN). OCNW has always remained outside NOCN and has no official relationship with it.

Ascentis awards two main types of qualification at a range of levels:

1. Ofqual Approved Qualifications (including areas such as Teacher Training, Skills for Life, Functional Skills, Vocational qualifications, Foundation Learning, ESOL including ESOL International, etc.).
2. QAA Access to Higher Education, along eight pathways (including Education Professions, Vocational Science, Health and Social Care Professions, etc.).

Ascentis is now accrediting learners in the UK and around the world, and is a recognised education charity, supporting over 200,000 learners each year to climb the 'qualifications ladder' and achieve their lifelong aspirations.

On 1 August 2009 OCNW changed its name to Ascentis to reflect the fact that it was now a national and international awarding body and in order to reduce confusion with NOCN members.
